= Night Tube =

Overnight service provided on the London Underground railway from Friday to Sunday

Night Tube and London Overground Night Service

Overview
- Locale: Greater London
- Transit type: Rapid transit Suburban rail
- Number of lines: 6

Operation
- Began operation: 19 August 2016
- Operators: London Underground (5 lines); London Overground (1 line)
Night Tube map

The Night Tube and London Overground Night Service, often referred to simply as Night Tube, is a service pattern on the London Underground ("Tube") and London Overground systems which provides through-the-night services on Friday and Saturday nights on the Central, Jubilee, Northern, Piccadilly, and Victoria lines, and a short section of the London Overground's Windrush line. The service began on the night of Friday 19 August 2016, providing 24-hour service on these routes from Friday morning to Sunday evening each weekend. It was suspended from Friday 20 March 2020 because of the COVID-19 pandemic, with the service partially reopening on Saturday 27 November 2021 and fully restored by Friday 29 July 2022.

== Background ==
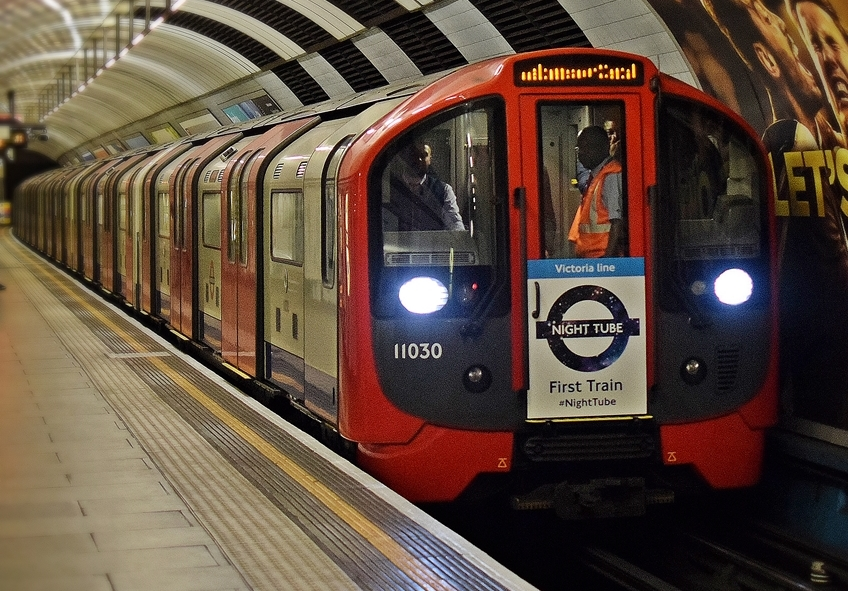
The first Victoria line Night Tube service pulling into Pimlico Underground station

Since the London Underground's inception, the practice of running night-time services has been difficult, mainly due to night-time noise, and maintenance work that is usually carried out during the night. General mass upgrades to the overall London Underground network from the late-1990s onwards, along with large infrastructure improvements to stations and signalling, (Note: These include the Jubilee, Northern, Piccadilly and Victoria line capacity upgrades. Upgrades to major stations include Green Park and King's Cross St Pancras, while others had improvements such as addition of Help Points, new induction loops to assist hearing-impaired passengers and step-free access.) plus the building of Crossrail with sections going underground to connect with the main London Underground system, made it possible to introduce a limited night-time Tube service.

== History ==
In September 2014, TfL announced the introduction of the Night Tube. The initial plans were for Friday and Saturday through the night services on a limited number of lines, with, on average, a train every 10 minutes or less, continuing from around midnight when train services usually close to around 5 a.m. and into the usual morning service.

The planned service was on the whole of the Jubilee and Victoria lines. In addition to that, there was planned services on the Central line between Ealing Broadway and Hainault or Loughton, the Northern line between Morden and Edgware or High Barnet via Charing Cross, (Note: The Bank branch is not served by Night Tube due to nighttime construction on that branch, in relation to the Bank station upgrade.) and the Piccadilly line between Cockfosters and Heathrow Terminal 5. (Note: The initial plans did not include the Central line between Leytonstone and Loughton (as of 9 December 2014).) The service was scheduled to launch on 11/12 September 2015, with the prospect of expansion across further lines in subsequent years. However, due to strike action, the start of the Night Tube was postponed until 18 August 2016.

=== Strike action ===
Members of several unions decided to take strike action in relation to the terms and conditions being offered by London Underground, largely regarding agreements specifically over the pay deal and hours worked by new Night Tube service personnel. Members of the National Union of Rail, Maritime and Transport Workers (RMT), Transport Salaried Staffs' Association (TSSA), and Unite officially started the first 24-hour strike at 18:30 BST on 8 July 2015, and the Associated Society of Locomotive Engineers and Firemen (ASLEF) drivers starting their 24-hour action from 21:30 BST on 8 July 2015, with disruption occurring several hours either side of the start and finish times. London Underground warned there could be no services on Thursday as a result of the walk-out. The strike affected all Tube lines and finished at 21:30 BST on 9 July 2015. A second 24-hour strike action by London Underground trade unions took place from 18:30 BST on 5 August 2015 until 05:00 BST on 7 August 2015, and there was no service at all on 6 August 2015.

Three unions also threatened to strike on 25 and 27 August 2015, where talks were held between the unions and London Underground for negotiations. ASLEF decided not to participate in the planned strikes. On 27 August 2015, it was announced that the start date for the Night Tube had been pushed back due to ongoing talks about contract terms between trade unions and London Underground. Following agreement of new terms by TfL and the unions, Night Tube operations were confirmed to start in the second half of 2016.

=== Service launch ===
The first Night Tube train ran on the night of Friday 19 August 2016, with the Central and Victoria line services starting that night. The Jubilee line services started on 7 October 2016, the Northern line on 18 November 2016 (Note: Night Tube services did not stop at Charing Cross until 29 June 2017 due to improvement works on the Northern line ticket hall.) and the Piccadilly line on 16 December 2016.

On 15 December 2017 the London Overground started the East London line (now known as the Windrush line) night service running between Dalston Junction and New Cross Gate. This was extended to Highbury & Islington on 23 February 2018. Between 2016 and 2018, there were also a series of Tube map covers to promote Night Tube.

=== Coronavirus pandemic ===
Night Tube services were suspended from Friday 20 March 2020, during the COVID-19 pandemic. It was originally planned to restart in Spring 2021, but in April 2021 it was announced that the service would stay closed until at least 2022. However, in November 2021, Night Tube services on the Central and Victoria lines reopened for the first time since the beginning of the pandemic, after an 18-month hiatus. The East London Line on the London Overground reopened on 17 December 2021, the Jubilee line on 21 May 2022, and the Northern Line also reopened on 2 July 2022. The Piccadilly line was the last to re-open, with the original service restored from 29 July 2022.

== Services ==
Typical Night Tube services are as follows:

London Underground
Line	Route	Frequency /Headway	Calling at
Central line	Ealing Broadway (eastbound)/ White City (westbound): Hainault	3 times per hour (tph) (Note: Central line services combine between White City and Leytonstone to run 6tph / every 10 minutes. Services between Ealing Broadway and White City run 3tph / every 20 minutes, going to Hainault, but coming from Loughton.) every 20 min	West Acton (eastbound-only), North Acton (eastbound-only), East Acton (eastbound-only), White City, Shepherd's Bush, Holland Park, Notting Hill Gate, Queensway, Lancaster Gate, Marble Arch, Bond Street, Oxford Circus, Tottenham Court Road, Holborn, Chancery Lane, St Paul's, Bank, Liverpool Street, Bethnal Green, Mile End, Stratford, Leyton, Leytonstone, Wanstead, Redbridge, Gants Hill, Newbury Park, Barkingside, Fairlop
Central line	Ealing Broadway (westbound) / White City (eastbound): Loughton	3 times per hour (tph) every 20 min	West Acton (westbound-only), North Acton (westbound-only), East Acton (westbound-only), White City, Shepherd's Bush, Holland Park, Notting Hill Gate, Queensway, Lancaster Gate, Marble Arch, Bond Street, Oxford Circus, Tottenham Court Road, Holborn, Chancery Lane, St Paul's, Bank, Liverpool Street, Bethnal Green, Mile End, Stratford, Leyton, Leytonstone, Snaresbrook, South Woodford, Woodford, Buckhurst Hill
Jubilee line	Stanmore - Stratford	6tph every 10 min	Canons Park, Queensbury, Kingsbury, Wembley Park, Neasden, Dollis Hill, Willesden Green, Kilburn, West Hampstead, Finchley Road, Swiss Cottage, St John's Wood, Baker Street, Bond Street, Green Park, Westminster, Waterloo, Southwark, London Bridge, Bermondsey, Canada Water, Canary Wharf, North Greenwich, Canning Town, West Ham
Northern line	Edgware - Morden via Charing Cross	4tph (Note: Northern line services combine between Camden Town and Morden to run 8tph / every 7-8 minutes. All trains operate between Camden Town and Kennington via the Charing Cross branch.) every 15 min	Burnt Oak, Colindale, Hendon Central, Brent Cross, Golders Green, Hampstead, Belsize Park, Chalk Farm, Camden Town, Mornington Crescent, Euston, Warren Street, Goodge Street, Tottenham Court Road, Leicester Square, Charing Cross, Embankment, Waterloo, Kennington, Oval, Stockwell, Clapham North, Clapham Common, Clapham South, Balham, Tooting Bec, Tooting Broadway, Colliers Wood, South Wimbledon
Northern line	High Barnet - Morden via Charing Cross	4tph every 15 min	Totteridge & Whetstone, Woodside Park, West Finchley, Finchley Central, East Finchley, Highgate, Archway, Tufnell Park, Kentish Town, Camden Town, Mornington Crescent, Euston, Warren Street, Goodge Street, Tottenham Court Road, Leicester Square, Charing Cross, Embankment, Waterloo, Kennington, Oval, Stockwell, Clapham North, Clapham Common, Clapham South, Balham, Tooting Bec, Tooting Broadway, Colliers Wood, South Wimbledon
Piccadilly line	Heathrow Terminal 5 - Cockfosters	6tph every 10 min	Heathrow Terminals 2 & 3, Hatton Cross, Hounslow West, Hounslow Central, Hounslow East, Osterley, Boston Manor, Northfields, South Ealing, Acton Town, Turnham Green, Hammersmith, Barons Court, Earl's Court, Gloucester Road, South Kensington, Knightsbridge, Hyde Park Corner, Green Park, Piccadilly Circus, Leicester Square, Covent Garden, Holborn, Russell Square, King's Cross St Pancras, Caledonian Road, Holloway Road, Arsenal, Finsbury Park, Manor House, Turnpike Lane, Wood Green, Bounds Green, Arnos Grove, Southgate, Oakwood
Victoria line	Walthamstow Central - Brixton	6tph every 10 min	Blackhorse Road, Tottenham Hale, Seven Sisters, Finsbury Park, Highbury & Islington, King's Cross St Pancras, Euston, Warren Street, Oxford Circus, Green Park, Victoria, Pimlico, Vauxhall, Stockwell
London Overground
Line	Route	Frequency /Headway	Calling at
Windrush line	Highbury & Islington - New Cross Gate	4tph every 15 min	Canonbury, Dalston Junction, Haggerston, Hoxton, Shoreditch High Street, Whitechapel, Shadwell, Wapping, Rotherhithe, Canada Water, Surrey Quays

== Expected benefits ==
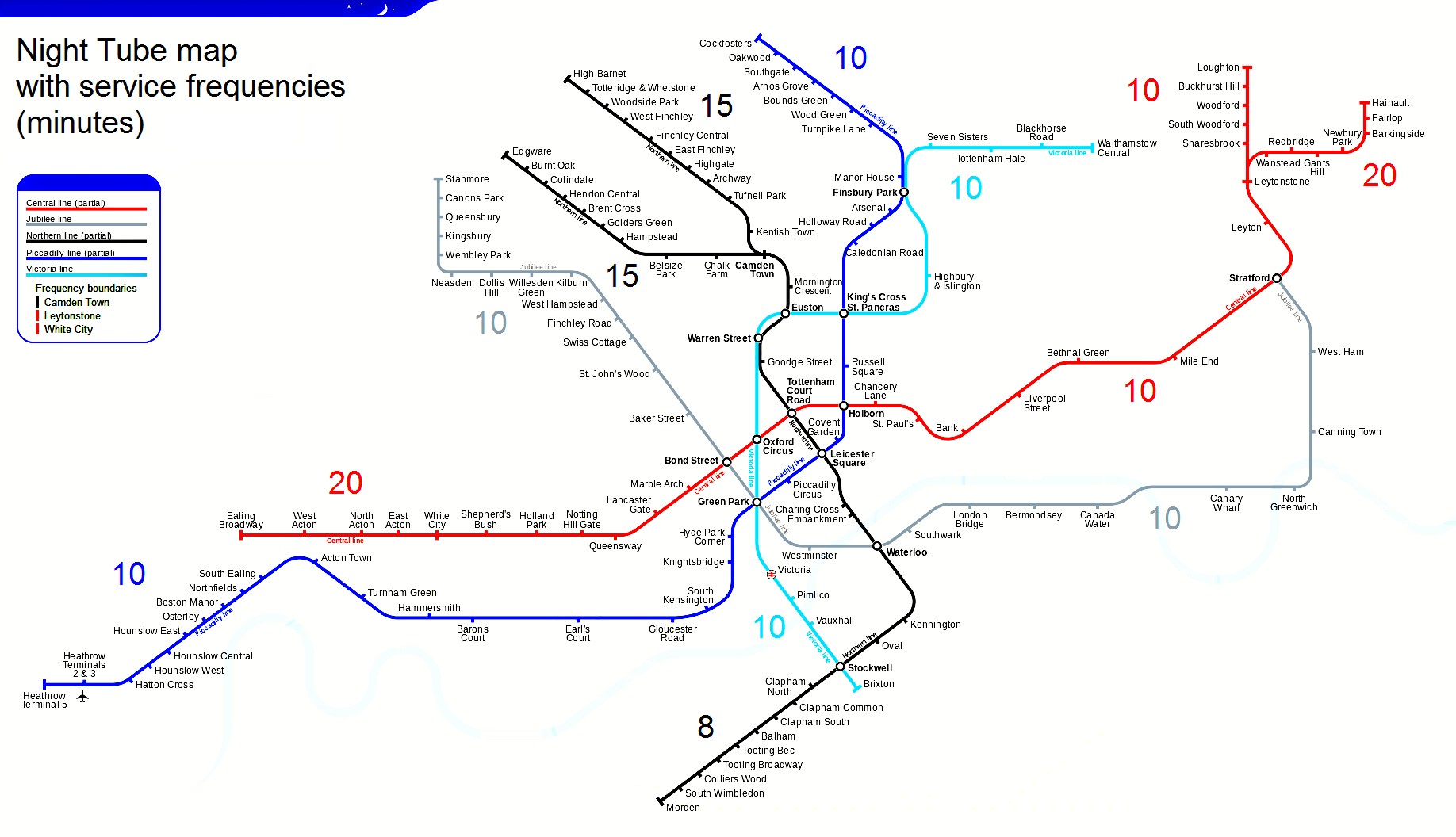
Map of the Night Tube including service frequencies in minutes

TfL estimated that the Night Tube would lead to the creation of 1,965 permanent jobs, the net additional output produced as a result equating to an additional £360m over 30 years (i.e. £12m per year). These include:

- An estimated 1,965 permanent jobs supported by the Night Tube — 265 through direct operation of the service and 1,700 indirectly in the night-time economy, taking into account impacts on London's night-time economy and the additional London Underground staff required.
- Time savings of, on average, 20 minutes (but in some cases up to an hour) on some routes.
- Standard business case shows that for each £1 spent on delivering the Night Tube, benefits will be £2.70. Adding in wider economic impacts increases this benefit by £1.20 for every pound spent.

In addition to the above quantifiable benefits, other benefits TfL believed the service was likely to deliver include:

- Reduced demand for illegal minicabs, thus improved safety in taxis at night.
- Improved commuter journeys for many people who work during the night-time in central London but live outside the centre.
- Potential for longer operating hours for pubs, bars, clubs, restaurants, bowling alleys, cinemas, museums, art galleries, and other attractions.
- Reduced congestion at stations after events at entertainment venues like the O2, as people are not in such a rush to leave to catch the last Tube as events finish.
- Improved accessibility to Heathrow for passengers flying or entering before 07:00 at the weekend.
