= Wanstead tube station =

London Underground station

Wanstead
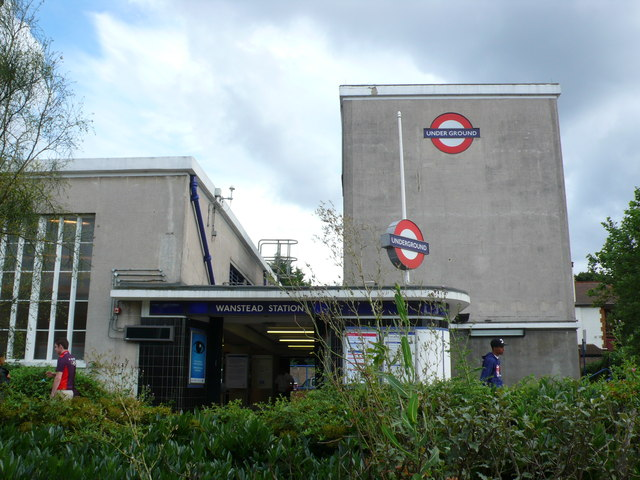
- Northern entrance
- Interactive map of Wanstead

General information
- Location: Wanstead
- Local authority: London Borough of Redbridge
- Managed by: London Underground
- Number of platforms: 2
- Fare zone: 4

London Underground annual entry and exit
- 2021: ▲1.18 million
- 2022: ▲1.88 million
- 2023: ▲1.95 million
- 2024: ▼1.90 million
- 2025: ▼1.87 million

Key dates
- 1942-1945: Tunnels used as munition factory by Plessey company
- 14 December 1947: Opened

Other information
- External links: TfL station info page
- Coordinates: 51.575556°N 0.028889°E

Wanstead (/ˈwɒnstɪd/) is a London Underground station in Wanstead in the London Borough of Redbridge, east London. It is on the Hainault loop of the Central line, between Leytonstone and Redbridge stations. It is in London fare zone 4. It opened on 14 December 1947 as an extension of the Central line to form the new part of the Hainault Loop.

== History ==
The extension of the Central line eastwards from Liverpool Street was first proposed in 1935 by the London Passenger Transport Board. The station at Wanstead George Green would be one of three stations in Tube tunnel between Leytonstone and Newbury Park.

Construction of the station began in the mid-1930s, but was delayed by the onset of World War II. The incomplete tunnels between Wanstead and Gants Hill to the east were used for munitions production by Plessey between 1942 and 1945. The station was finally opened on 14 December 1947. The building, like the other two below-ground stations on the branch, was designed by architect Charles Holden. It kept its original wooden escalator until 2003, one of the last Tube stations to do so.

The station has been extensively refurbished since 2006, including the replacement of the original platform wall tiling, which had become badly damaged.

The site of William Penn's home in Wanstead was on the site of the station.

== Connections ==
The station is served by London Buses routes 66, 101, 145, 308, W12, W13 and W14, and also by night routes N8 and N55.

Preceding station	London Underground	Following station
Leytonstone towards Ealing Broadway or West Ruislip	Central line via Hainault Loop	Redbridge towards Hainault or Woodford
