= Fairlop tube station =

London Underground station

Fairlop
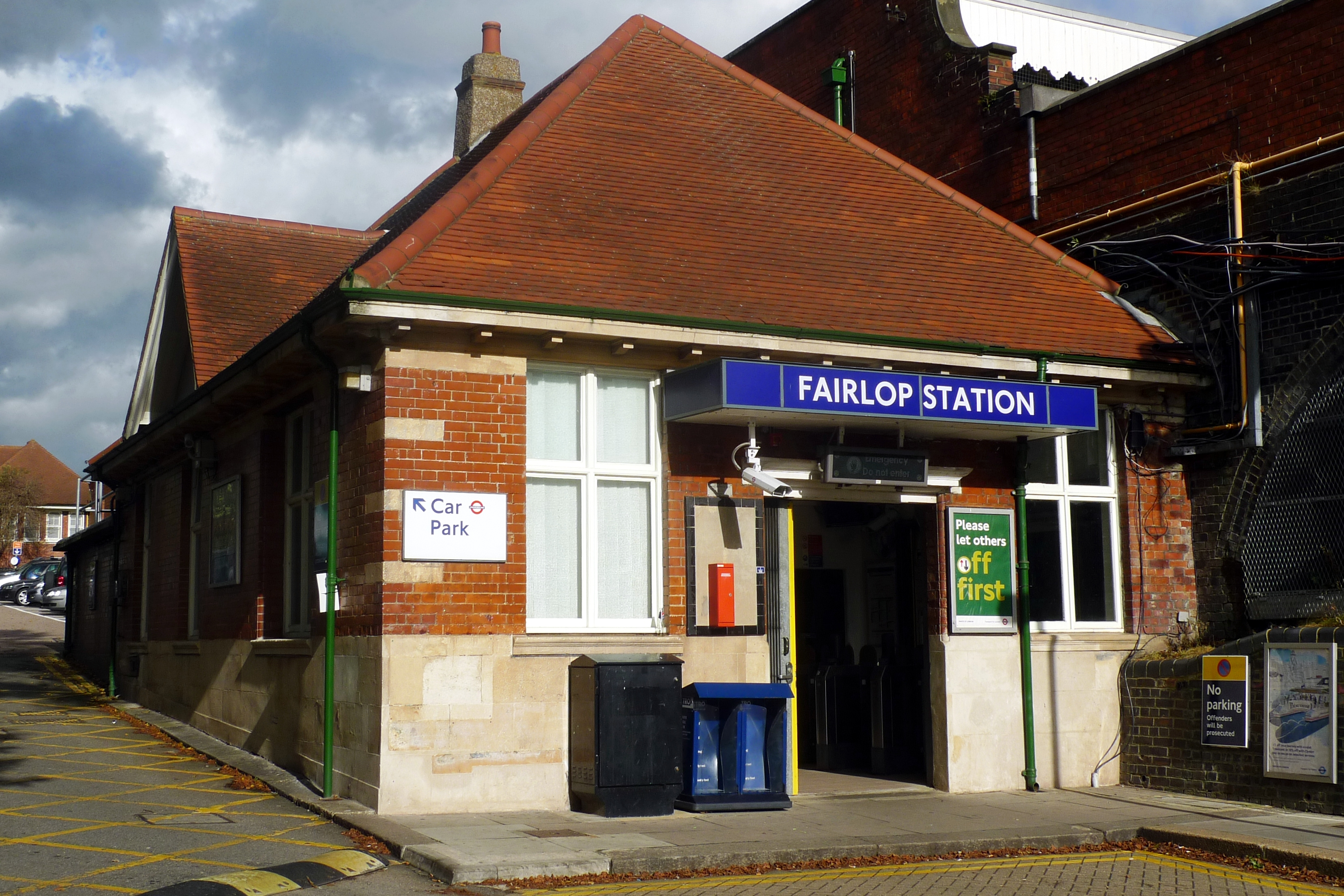
- Station entrance
- Interactive map of Fairlop

General information
- Location: Fairlop
- Local authority: London Borough of Redbridge
- Managed by: London Underground
- Number of platforms: 2
- Fare zone: 4

London Underground annual entry and exit
- 2021: ▼0.54 million
- 2022: ▲0.87 million
- 2023: ▲0.89 million
- 2024: ▲0.92 million
- 2025: ▼0.90 million

Key dates
- 1 May 1903: Opened (GER)
- 29 November 1947: Closed (LNER)
- 31 May 1948: Opened (Central line)
- 24 March 1958: Goods yard closed

Other information
- External links: TfL station info page
- Coordinates: 51.59562°N 0.09054°E

Fairlop is a London Underground station in Fairlop in east London. It is on the Hainault loop of the Central line between Barkingside and Hainault stations. The station has been in London fare zone 4 since 2 January 2007. It is on the north side of Forest Road, in Fairlop, just north of Barkingside.

== History ==
The station was opened on 1 May 1903 as part of the Great Eastern Railway's (GER) Woodford to Ilford "loop" or branch line (the Fairlop Loop). This line, designed to stimulate suburban growth, had a chequered career. As a consequence of the Railways Act 1921, the GER was merged with other railway companies in 1923 to become part of the London and North Eastern Railway (LNER). As part of the 1935 – 1940 New Works Programme of the London Passenger Transport Board, the majority of the loop was to be transferred to form the eastern extensions of the Central line. Although work commenced in 1938, it was suspended on the outbreak of the Second World War in 1939 and work only recommenced in 1946.

Steam train services serving Fairlop were suspended on 29 November 1947 and electrified Central line passenger services, to Central London via Gants Hill, finally commenced on 31 May 1948. The line from Newbury Park to Hainault through Fairlop had been electrified for empty train movements to the new depot at Hainault from 14 December 1947.

Few alterations took place during this transfer, and the station remains a fine example of an Edwardian railway station including canopies that still bear the GER symbol in the bracketry.

The station has toilet facilities, a car park, and a waiting room on both westbound and eastbound platforms.

Preceding station	London Underground	Following station
Barkingside towards Ealing Broadway or West Ruislip	Central line via Hainault loop	Hainault towards Hainault or Woodford
