= List of stations in London fare zone 4 =

Fare zone 4 is an outer zone of Transport for London's zonal fare system used for calculating the price of tickets for travel on the London Underground, London Overground, Docklands Light Railway (DLR) and, since 2007, on National Rail services. It was created on 22 May 1983 as Outer zone 3b, one of five zones introduced for the Travelcard. The zone took its current name on 8 January 1989. It extends from approximately 6.75 to 10 miles (11 to 16 km) from Piccadilly Circus.

== List of stations ==
The following stations are within zone 4:

Station	Local authority	Managed by	Notes
Abbey Wood	Greenwich / Bexley	Elizabeth line	
Alperton	Brent	London Underground	
Anerley	Bromley	Southern	
Arnos Grove	Enfield	London Underground	
Barking	Barking and Dagenham	c2c	
Barking Riverside	Barking and Dagenham	London Overground	
Barkingside	Redbridge	London Underground	
Beckenham Hill	Lewisham	Southeastern	
Beckenham Junction	Bromley	Southeastern	
Boston Manor	Hounslow / Ealing	London Underground	
Bounds Green	Haringey	London Underground	Also in zone 3
Bowes Park	Haringey	Great Northern	Also in zone 3
Brentford	Hounslow	South Western Railway	
Bromley North	Bromley	Southeastern	
Burnt Oak	Barnet	London Underground	
Castle Bar Park	Ealing	Great Western Railway	
Chigwell	Epping Forest	London Underground	Outside Greater London (Note: All stations in Greater London are in fare zones 1–6. Typically, stations beyond the boundary with Transport for London ticketing are in fares zones 7–9 or special fares apply.)
Clock House	Bromley	Southeastern	
Colindale	Barnet	London Underground	
Crystal Palace	Bromley	London Overground	Also in zone 3
Drayton Green	Ealing	Great Western Railway	
East Ham	Newham	London Underground	Also in zone 3
Edmonton Green	Enfield	London Overground	
Elmers End	Bromley	Southeastern	
Elmstead Woods	Bromley	Southeastern	
Eltham	Greenwich	Southeastern	
Fairlop	Redbridge	London Underground	
Falconwood	Bexley	Southeastern	
Finchley Central	Barnet	London Underground	
Gants Hill	Redbridge	London Underground	
Goodmayes	Redbridge	Elizabeth line	
Grange Hill	Epping Forest	London Underground	Outside Greater London
Greenford	Ealing	London Underground	
Grove Park	Lewisham	Southeastern	
Hackbridge	Sutton	Southern	
Hainault	Redbridge	London Underground	
Hanwell	Ealing	Great Western Railway	
Hendon	Barnet	Thameslink	Also in zone 3
Hendon Central	Barnet	London Underground	Also in zone 3
Highams Park	Waltham Forest	London Overground	
Hounslow Central	Hounslow	London Underground	
Hounslow East	Hounslow	London Underground	
Ilford	Redbridge	Elizabeth line	
Isleworth	Hounslow	South Western Railway	
Kent House	Bromley	Southeastern	
Kenton	Brent	London Underground	
Kew Gardens	Richmond upon Thames	London Underground	Also in zone 3
Kingsbury	Brent	London Underground	
Leytonstone	Waltham Forest	London Underground	Also in zone 3
Lower Sydenham	Bromley / Lewisham	Southeastern	
Malden Manor	Kingston upon Thames	South Western Railway	
Manor Park	Newham	Elizabeth line	Also in zone 3
Meridian Water	Enfield	Greater Anglia	
Mill Hill Broadway	Barnet	Thameslink	
Mill Hill East	Barnet	London Underground	
Mitcham Junction	Merton	Southern	
Morden	Merton	London Underground	
Morden South	Merton	Thameslink	
Motspur Park	Merton	South Western Railway	
Mottingham	Greenwich	Southeastern	
New Beckenham	Bromley	Southeastern	
New Eltham	Greenwich	Southeastern	
New Malden	Kingston upon Thames	South Western Railway	
New Southgate	Enfield	Great Northern	
Newbury Park	Redbridge	London Underground	
North Wembley	Brent	London Underground	
Northwick Park	Brent	London Underground	
Norwood Junction	Croydon	London Overground	
Oakleigh Park	Barnet	Great Northern	
Osterley	Hounslow	London Underground	
Palmers Green	Enfield	Great Northern	
Penge East	Bromley	Southeastern	
Penge West	Bromley	London Overground	
Perivale	Ealing	London Underground	
Plumstead	Greenwich	Southeastern	
Preston Road	Brent	London Underground	
Queensbury	Brent	London Underground	
Ravensbourne	Bromley	Southeastern	
Raynes Park	Merton	South Western Railway	
Redbridge	Redbridge	London Underground	
Richmond	Richmond upon Thames	South Western Railway	
Roding Valley	Epping Forest	London Underground	Outside Greater London
Selhurst	Croydon	Southern	
Seven Kings	Redbridge	Elizabeth line	
Shortlands	Bromley	Southeastern	
Silver Street	Enfield	London Overground	
Snaresbrook	Redbridge	London Underground	
South Greenford	Ealing	London Underground	
South Kenton	Brent	London Underground	
South Merton	Merton	Thameslink	
South Wimbledon	Merton	London Underground	Also in zone 3
South Woodford	Redbridge	London Underground	
Southall	Ealing	Elizabeth line	
Southgate	Enfield	London Underground	
Sudbury & Harrow Road	Brent	Chiltern Railways	
Sudbury Hill	Harrow	London Underground	
Sudbury Hill Harrow	Harrow	Chiltern Railways	
Sudbury Town	Brent	London Underground	
Sundridge Park	Bromley	Southeastern	
Sutton Common	Sutton	Thameslink	
St Helier	Merton	Thameslink	
St Margarets	Richmond upon Thames	South Western Railway	
Syon Lane	Hounslow	South Western Railway	
Thornton Heath	Croydon	Southern	
Totteridge & Whetstone	Barnet	London Underground	
Upney	Barking and Dagenham	London Underground	
Wanstead	Redbridge	London Underground	
Welling	Bexley	Southeastern	
Wembley Central	Brent	London Underground	
Wembley Park	Brent	London Underground	
Wembley Stadium	Brent	Chiltern Railways	
West Finchley	Barnet	London Underground	
Winchmore Hill	Enfield	Great Northern	
Wood Street	Waltham Forest	London Overground	
Woodford	Redbridge	London Underground	
Woodgrange Park	Newham	London Overground	Also in zone 3
Woodside Park	Barnet	London Underground	
Woolwich	Greenwich	Elizabeth line	
Woolwich Arsenal DLR	Greenwich	DLR	
Woolwich Arsenal NR	Greenwich	Southeastern	
Worcester Park	Kingston upon Thames	South Western Railway	

== Changes ==
- January 2000: Beckton, Cyprus, Gallions Reach and Beckton Park (DLR) from Zone 4 to Zone 3
- January 2004: Crystal Palace from Zone 4 to Zone 3/4 boundary
- January 2007: Roding Valley, Chigwell, Grange Hill, Hainault, Fairlop and Barkingside from Zone 5 to Zone 4.
- June 2019: Removal of Angel Road and addition of Meridian Water
- May 2022: Addition of Woolwich
- July 2022: Addition of Barking Riverside
