= Gants Hill =

Area of Ilford, London, England

Coordinates: 51.5770°N 0.0719°E

- Location within Greater London
- OS grid reference: TQ435885
- London borough: Redbridge
- Ceremonial county: Greater London
- Region: London
- Country: England
- Sovereign state: United Kingdom
- Post town: ILFORD
- Postcode district: IG2
- Dialling code: 020
- Police: Metropolitan
- Fire: London
- Ambulance: London
- UK Parliament: Ilford North
- London Assembly: Havering and Redbridge

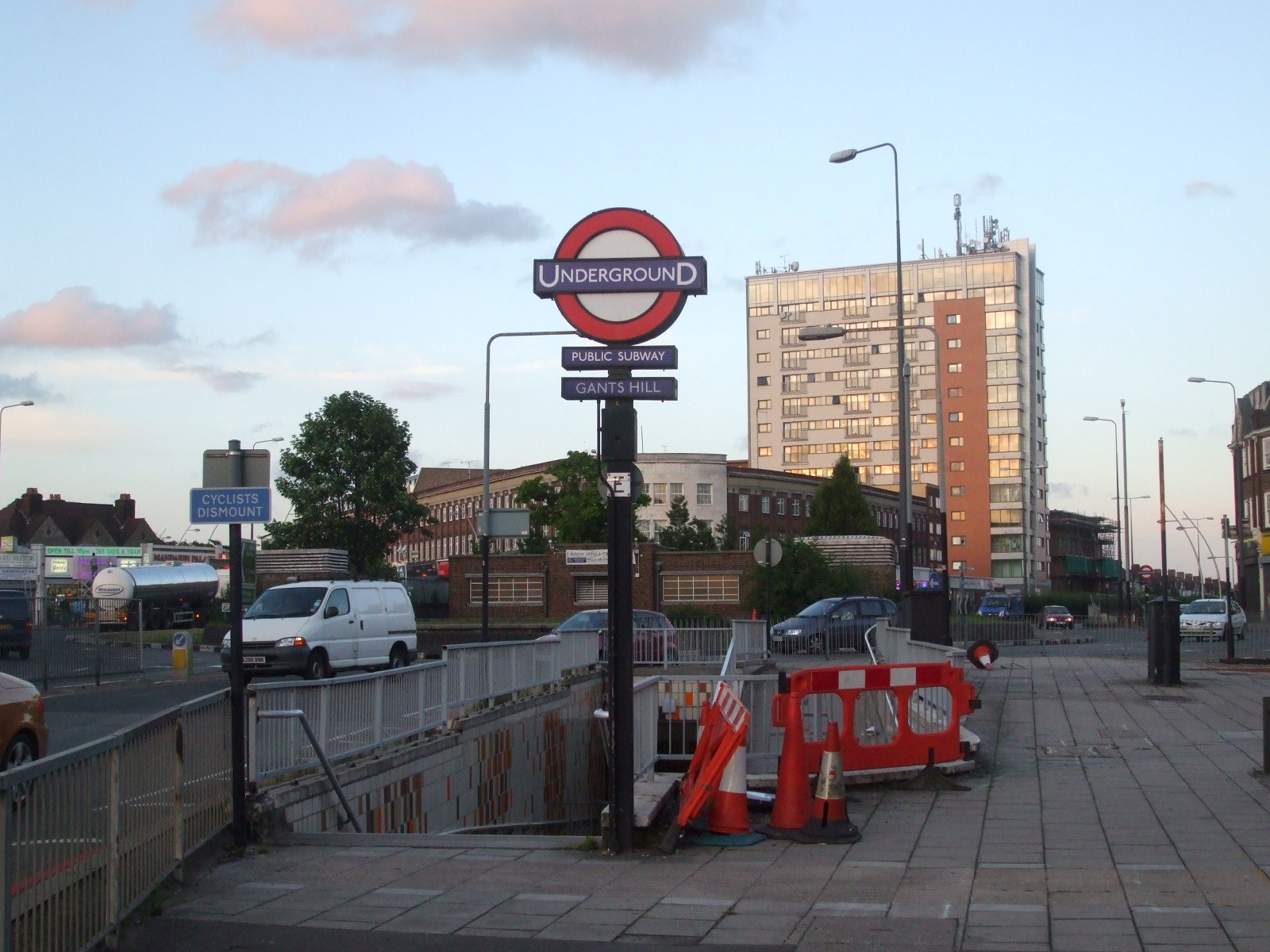
Gants Hill Roundabout and entrance to tube station and subway

Gants Hill is an area of Ilford in East London, England, within the borough of Redbridge. It is a suburb 9.5 miles (15.3 km) east northeast of Charing Cross. It lends its name to a central roundabout where five roads meet.

== History ==
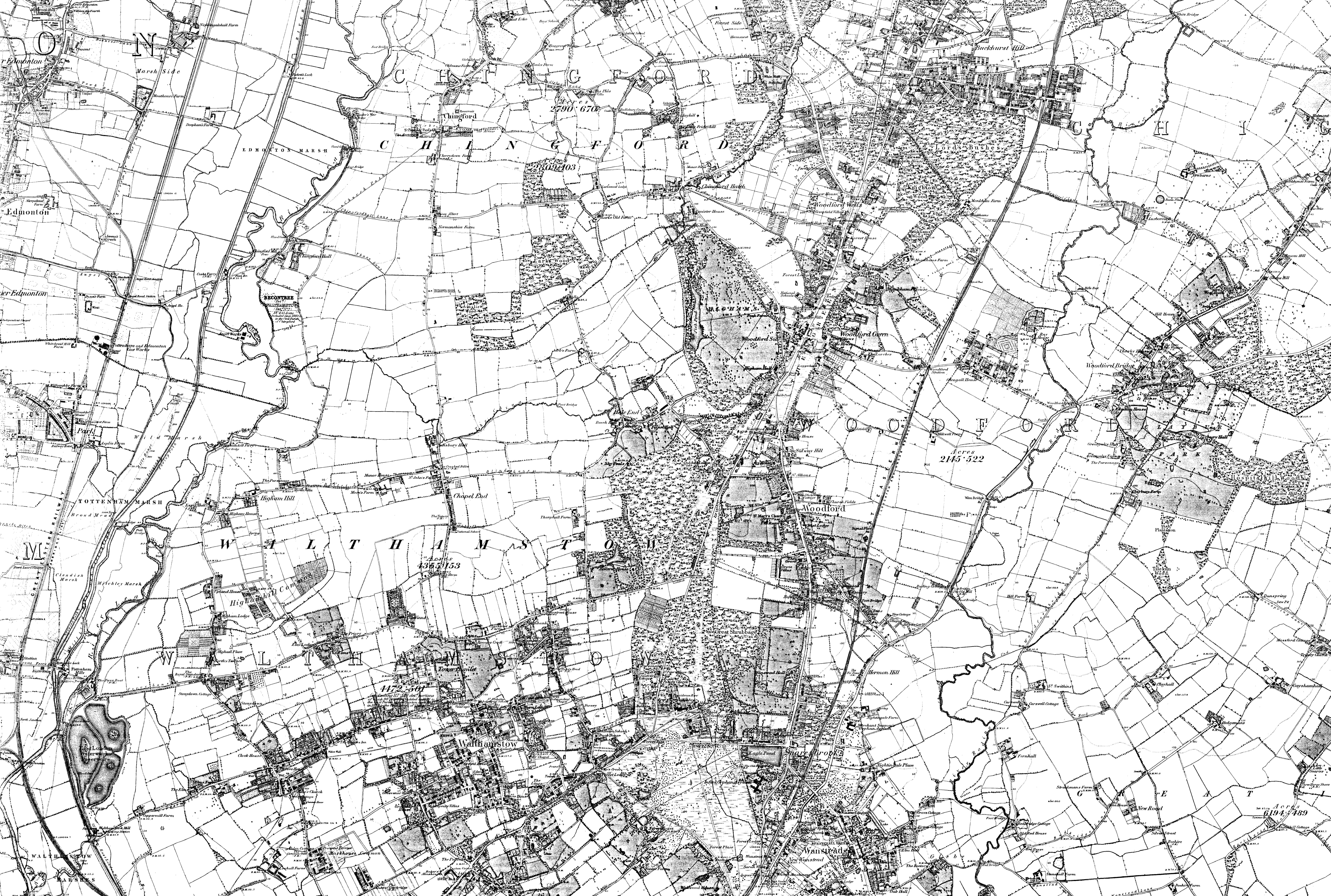
The name features in the 19th century in Gantshill/Gants Hill Cottage, such as in about 1880.

The name likely originated from the le Gant family, who were stewards of Barking Abbey. The name Gantesgrave appears in records as early as 1291.

== Geography ==
The area is mostly residential with a selection of retail outlets, a wide variety of restaurants, pub-restaurants, bars and a hotel. Green space with historic mansion, Valentines Park, occupies the land between Gants Hill and Ilford.

Valentines High School and Gearies School are local schools. Other nearby schools include Beal High School in Clayhall, King Solomon High School in Fairlop, and the selective grammar schools Ilford County High School and Woodford County High School in Barkingside and Woodford respectively.

Perth Road is the main road of the Commonwealth Estate, overlapping with Ilford proper, in which the roads are named after cities of former British colonies such as Aden, Colombo, Auckland, Toronto, Quebec, Melbourne and Perth.

The Odeon cinema, originally called the Savoy, was demolished in 2003 to provide space for a block of flats. It stood between Eastern Avenue and Perth Road.

Gants Hill hosts the popular 'Faces' nightclub, which is in Cranbrook Road. The club featured in the ITV2 reality series The Only Way Is Essex and opens Thursday to Saturday. The club has six bars, two music rooms and VIP tables.

Nearest places are Newbury Park, Barkingside, Ilford and Redbridge.

=== Renovation ===
Gants Hill roundabout and the surrounding area underwent extensive renovation, beginning in June 2009. The works were paid for by Transport for London. The project introduced new signalised pedestrian crossings around the roundabout whilst the Gants Hill subways received new floor tiles and coloured banding on the walls. The renovations were completed in late September 2010 with the Mayor of London, Boris Johnson, visiting the roundabout. Boris Johnson also unveiled a plaque to mark his visit.

== Transport ==
Formerly part of the A406, Woodford Avenue has now been renumbered as the A1400 and a new section of the A406 has been built through Redbridge and Ilford to Barking and Beckton. The A12 runs east–west, and the A123, Cranbrook Road, runs north–south, through Gants Hill roundabout, which is also the endpoint of the A1400. All these roads have several bus routes along them (see map). A one-way minor road, Clarence Avenue, also leads onto the roundabout.

=== Nearest stations ===
The nearest London Underground station is Gants Hill on the Central line. Ilford railway station is an Elizabeth line station to the south of the district.
