= Redbridge, London =

Area of Ilford, East London, England

Coordinates: 51.576°N 0.052°E

Redbridge
- Location within Greater London
- OS grid reference: TQ428883
- London borough: Redbridge
- Ceremonial county: Greater London
- Region: London
- Country: England
- Sovereign state: United Kingdom
- Post town: ILFORD
- Postcode district: IG1-IG8
- Post town: LONDON
- Postcode district: E18
- Dialling code: 020
- Police: Metropolitan
- Fire: London
- Ambulance: London
- UK Parliament: Ilford North
- London Assembly: Havering and Redbridge

Redbridge is an area in East London, England. It gives its name to (and is part of) the London Borough of Redbridge, a local government district of Greater London, with which it should not be confused.

== Etymology ==
The name comes from a bridge over the River Roding which was demolished in 1921. The bridge was made of red brick, unlike other bridges in the area, which were made of white stone. The name was later applied to the wider London borough created in 1965. The bridge was earlier known as Hocklee's Bridge.

== History ==
Historically, Redbridge formed part of the ancient parish of Barking in Essex. In 1888 it became part of the new civil parish of Ilford. The civil parish became a local board district in 1890, urban district in 1894 and municipal borough in 1926. The Municipal Borough of Ilford was abolished in 1965 and its former area became part of the London Borough of Redbridge in Greater London.

== Transport and locale ==
The nearest London Underground station is Redbridge on the Central line.

Nearest places

- Clayhall
- Gants Hill
- Ilford
- Snaresbrook
- Wanstead
