= Redbridge tube station =

London Underground station

Redbridge
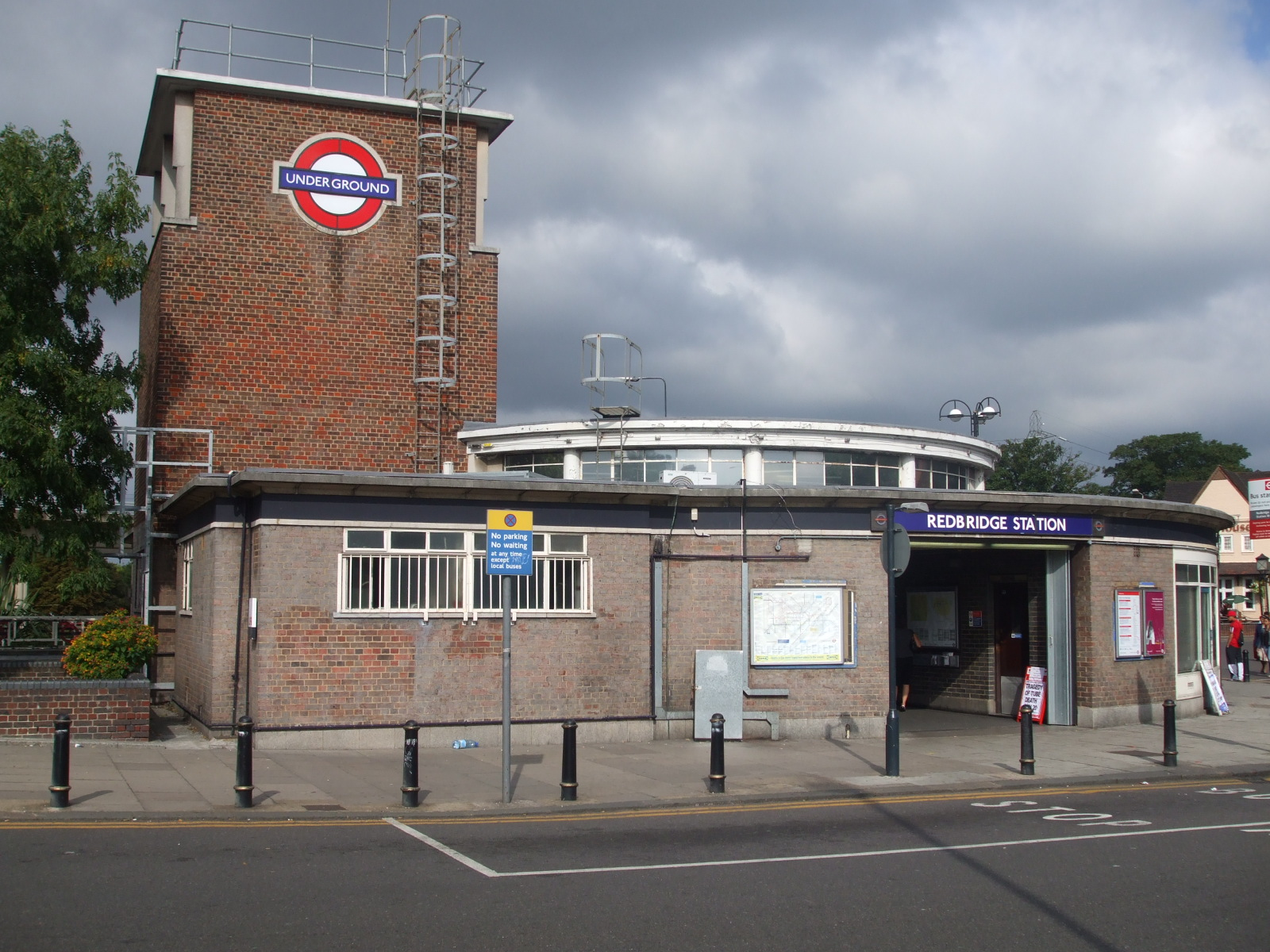
- Station entrance
- Interactive map of Redbridge

General information
- Location: Redbridge
- Local authority: London Borough of Redbridge
- Managed by: London Underground
- Number of platforms: 2
- Fare zone: 4

London Underground annual entry and exit
- 2020: ▼1.56 million
- 2021: ▼1.26 million
- 2022: ▲2.04 million
- 2023: ▼2.01 million
- 2024: ▲2.06 million

Key dates
- 1942–1945: Tunnels used as an aircraft parts factory by Plessey during the war
- 14 December 1947: Opened

Listed status
- Listing grade: II
- Entry number: 1401101
- Added to list: 20 July 2011

Other information
- External links: TfL station info page
- Coordinates: 51.5757°N 0.0449°E

Redbridge is a London Underground station on Eastern Avenue in the Redbridge district of Ilford, East London. It is on the Hainault Loop of the Central line between Wanstead and Gants Hill stations, and is in London fare zone 4. The station opened on 14 December 1947 as an extension of the Central line to form the new part of the Hainault loop.

== History ==
The extension of the Central line eastwards from Liverpool Street was first proposed in 1935 by the London Passenger Transport Board. The station at Ilford West (Red House) would be one of three stations in Tube tunnel between Leytonstone and Newbury Park.

Construction had begun in the mid 1930s, but was delayed by the onset of the Second World War. During the war, the completed train tunnels at Redbridge were used by the Plessey company as an aircraft parts factory between 1942 and 1945.

The station was opened on 14 December 1947. The station building was designed by renowned Tube architect, Charles Holden, who also designed the other two below ground stations on the branch. Originally, the station was to have been named "West Ilford", then this changed to "Red House", before the final decision was made on "Redbridge" (also given in the plans as "Red Bridge").

Since the station was built, a large roundabout has been constructed next to it, being a junction between the A406 (originally the terminal section of the M11), and the A12.

Redbridge is often described as the shallowest deep level (as opposed to cut-and-cover) station on the network, as it is only 5.2 metres (17 ft) beneath the surface. However, this is misleading as the station tunnel was constructed by the cut-and-cover method, with the running lines descending into genuine tube tunnels at either end of the platforms – similar to the Central line platforms at Mile End.

In July 2011 it was granted Grade II listed building status by English Heritage.

== Connections ==
London Buses routes 66, 145 and 366 and night route N8 serve the station.

== Inside the station ==
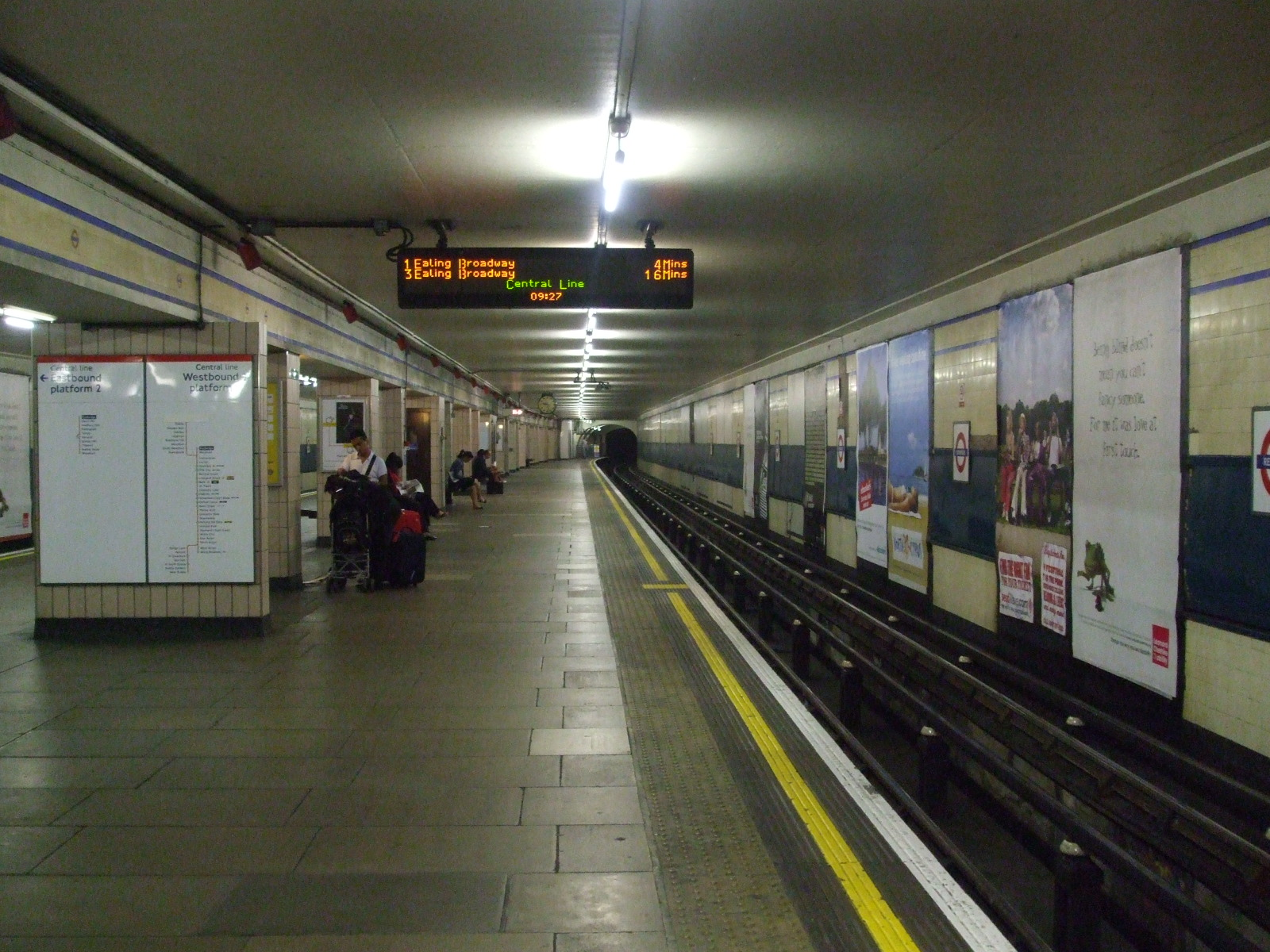
Westbound platform looking east

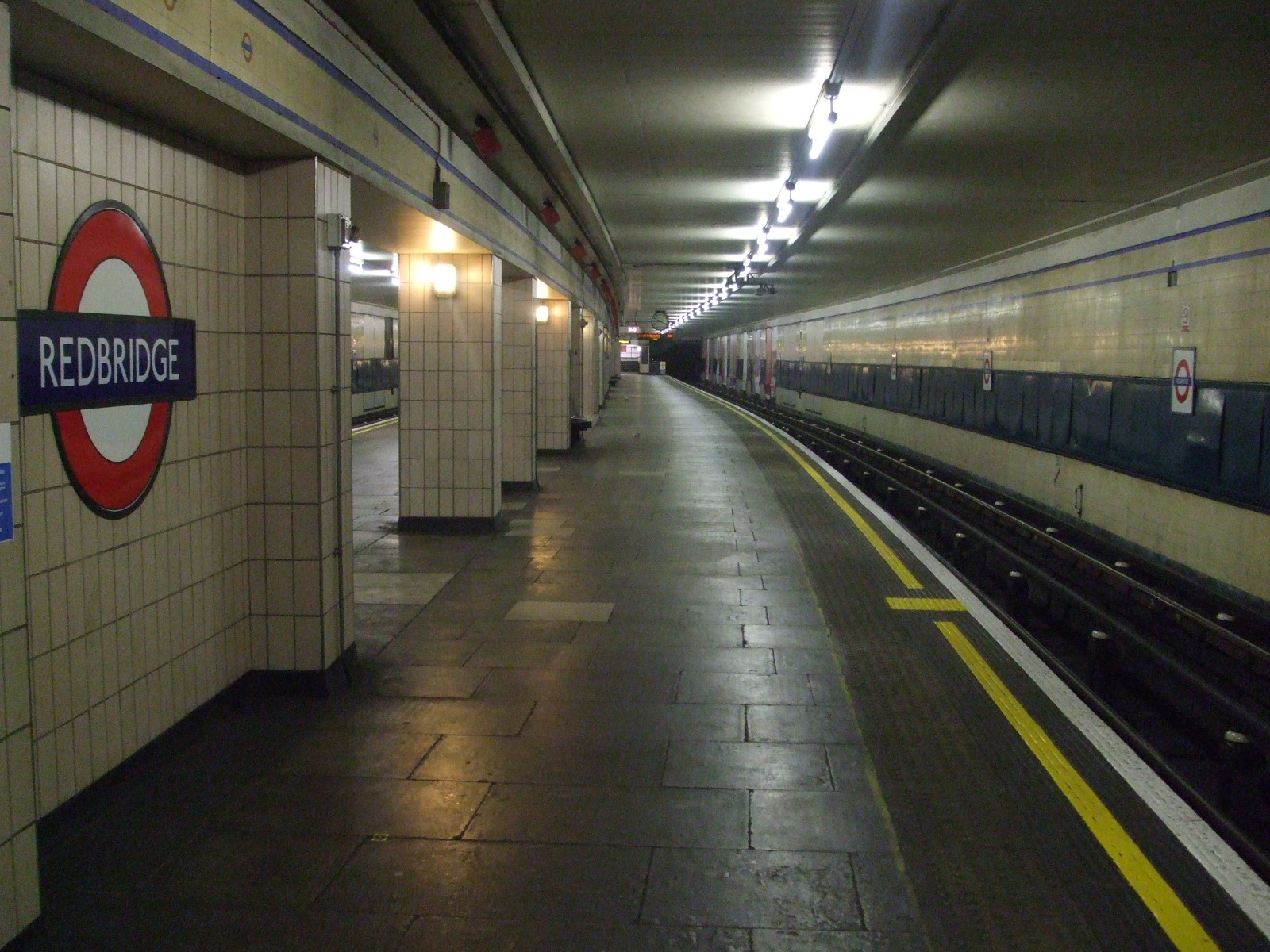
Eastbound platform looking west

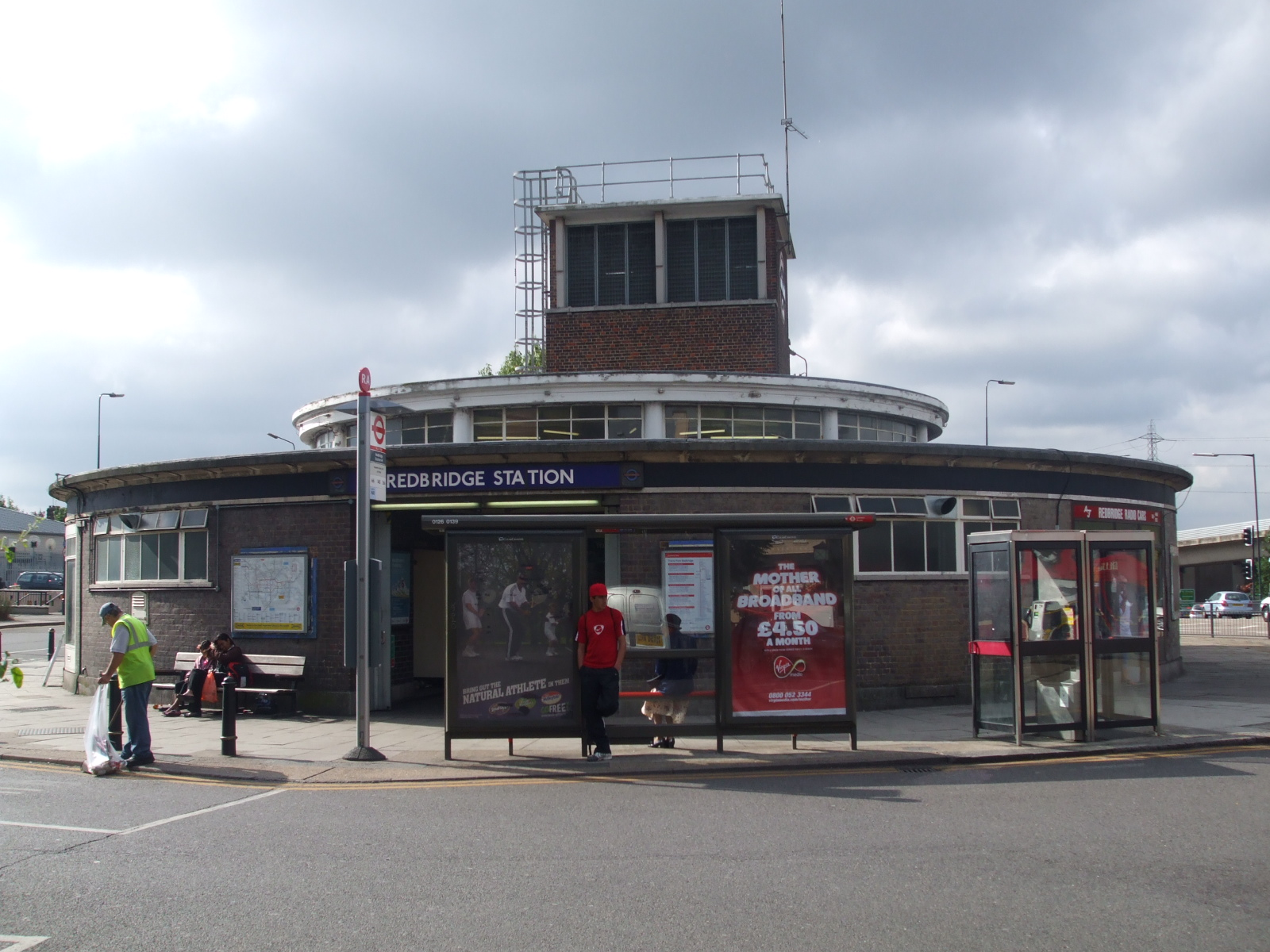
View of the station building looking south

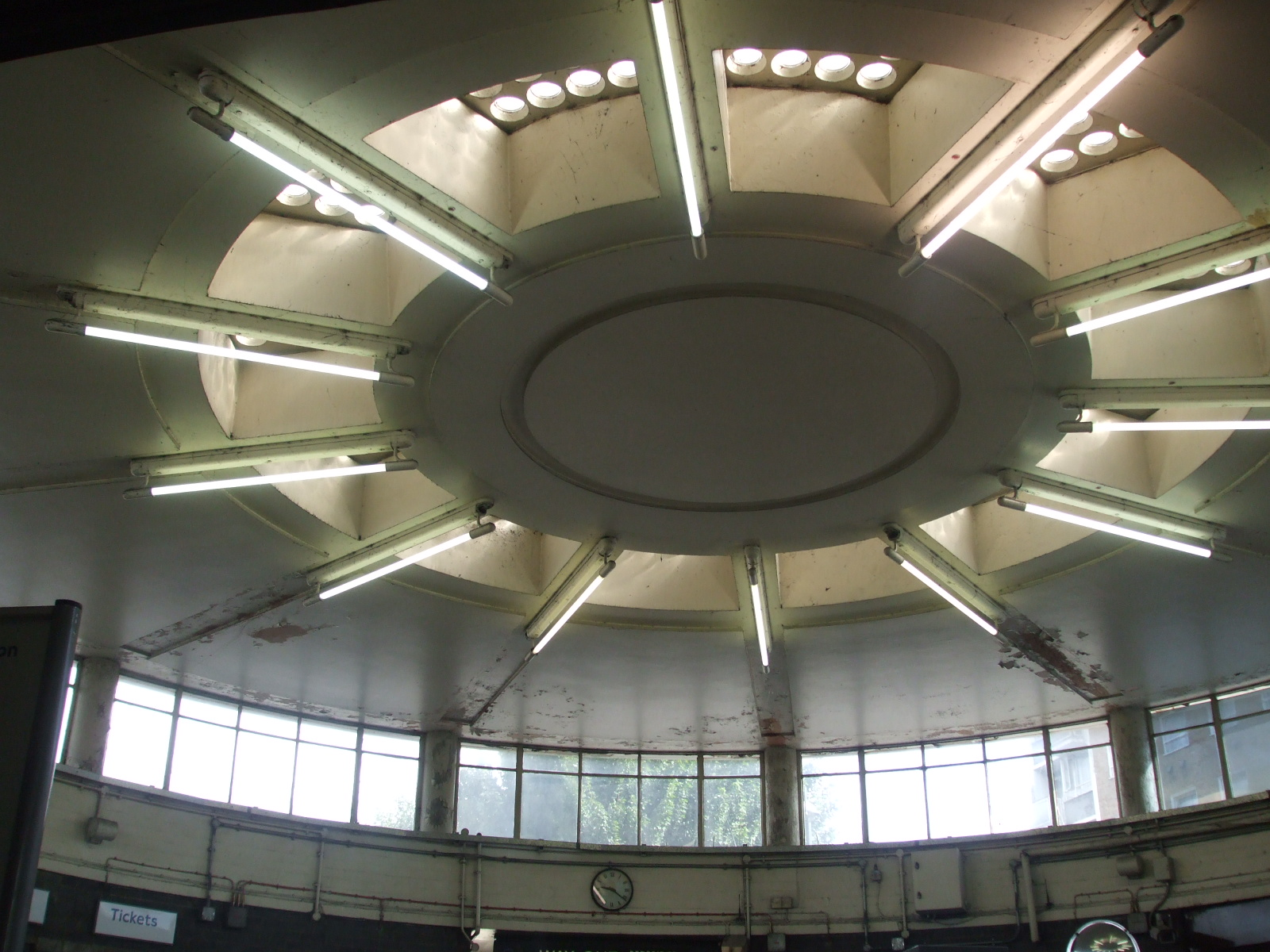
Ticket hall ceiling

Preceding station	London Underground	Following station
Wanstead towards Ealing Broadway or West Ruislip	Central line via Hainault Loop	Gants Hill towards Hainault or Woodford
