= London Borough of Redbridge =

Coordinates: 51°34′N 0°05′E

- London borough
- Coat of arms Council logo
- Motto(s): In unity, progress
- Redbridge shown within Greater London
- Sovereign state: United Kingdom
- Constituent country: England
- Region: London
- Ceremonial county: Greater London
- Created: 1 April 1965
- Admin HQ: Ilford

Government
  - Type: London borough council
  - Body: Redbridge London Borough Council
  - London Assembly: Keith Prince (Reform) AM for Havering and Redbridge
  - MPs: Calvin Bailey (Lab); Iain Duncan Smith (Con); Jas Athwal (Lab); Wes Streeting (Lab)

Area
  - Total: 21.78 sq mi (56.41 km^{2})
  - Rank: 236th (of 296)

Population (2025)
  - Total: 321,829
  - Rank: 43rd (of 296)
  - Density: 14,780/sq mi (5,705/km^{2})
- Time zone: UTC (GMT)
  - Summer (DST): UTC+1 (BST)
- Postcodes: E, IG, RM
- Area code: 020
- ISO 3166 code: GB-RDB
- ONS code: 00BC
- GSS code: E09000026
- Police: Metropolitan Police
- Website: https://www.redbridge.gov.uk/

The London Borough of Redbridge is a London borough established in 1965.

The borough shares boundaries with the Epping Forest District in the county of Essex to the north, the London Borough of Waltham Forest to the west, the London Borough of Havering to the east, the London Borough of Barking and Dagenham in the south east, and the London Borough of Newham to the south west.

The principal settlements in the borough are Ilford, Wanstead and Woodford.

== Etymology ==
The name comes from a bridge over the River Roding which was demolished in 1921. The bridge was made of red brick, unlike other bridges in the area made of white stone. The name had first been applied to the Redbridge area and Redbridge tube station was opened in 1947. It was earlier known as Hocklee's Bridge.

== History ==
The borough was formed in 1965 under the London Government Act 1963, covering the whole of the former municipal boroughs of Ilford and Wanstead and Woodford, plus smaller areas from the Municipal Borough of Dagenham and Chigwell Urban District, which were included to unite in one borough the Hainault area which had previously straddled Ilford, Dagenham and Chigwell. The area was transferred from Essex to Greater London to become one of the 32 London Boroughs.

Following a review by the Local Government Boundary Commission for England, minor changes were made on 1 April 1994 to the boundary with Barking & Dagenham and Newham. Further changes were made on 1 April 1995 to the boundary with Waltham Forest and Epping Forest District. The latter change transferred an area around Grange Hill and Roding Valley tube stations from Essex to Greater London.

== Geography ==
=== Parks and open spaces ===
Redbridge has more than 35 parks, playgrounds and open spaces. These include Hainault Forest Country Park, with 300 acres of countryside including adventure play areas, cafe and petting zoo; Roding Valley Park, a wildlife sanctuary with a range of flora and fauna and woodland areas; Valentines Park, including Valentines Mansion, ornamental gardens, bowling green and outdoor gym; and Claybury Woods and Park, a conservation area that features an ancient area of oak and hornbeam woodland, meadows and wildlife ponds.

=== Arts and culture ===
Valentines Mansion is a Georgian country house and gardens in the grounds of Valentines Park, Ilford.

Kenneth More Theatre in Oakfield Road, Ilford opened in 1975.

Redbridge Museum, which opened in 2000, is situated on the second floor of Redbridge Central Library, Clements Road, Ilford, along with the Redbridge Heritage Centre.

The Embassy Cinema is an Art Deco former cinema in Chadwell Heath. It opened in 1934 and closed in 1966, but is currently the focus of a major restoration project.

=== Libraries ===
Redbridge has 11 libraries across the borough. This includes the Redbridge Central Library, in Clements Road, Ilford, which had a major refurbishment in 2012. The libraries offer a number of services including reading clubs, story time sessions, study areas and learning resources. The libraries in Redbridge are operated by Vision Redbridge Culture & Leisure, a Charitable Trust established by Redbridge Council and now operating independently.

- Aldersbrook Library
- Fullwell Cross Library
- Gants Hill Library
- Goodmayes Library
- Hainault Library
- Redbridge Central Library (in Ilford town centre)
- Keith Axon Library (in Chadwell Heath)
- Seven Kings Library
- South Woodford Library & Gym
- Wanstead Library
- Woodford Green Library & Gym

== Governance ==
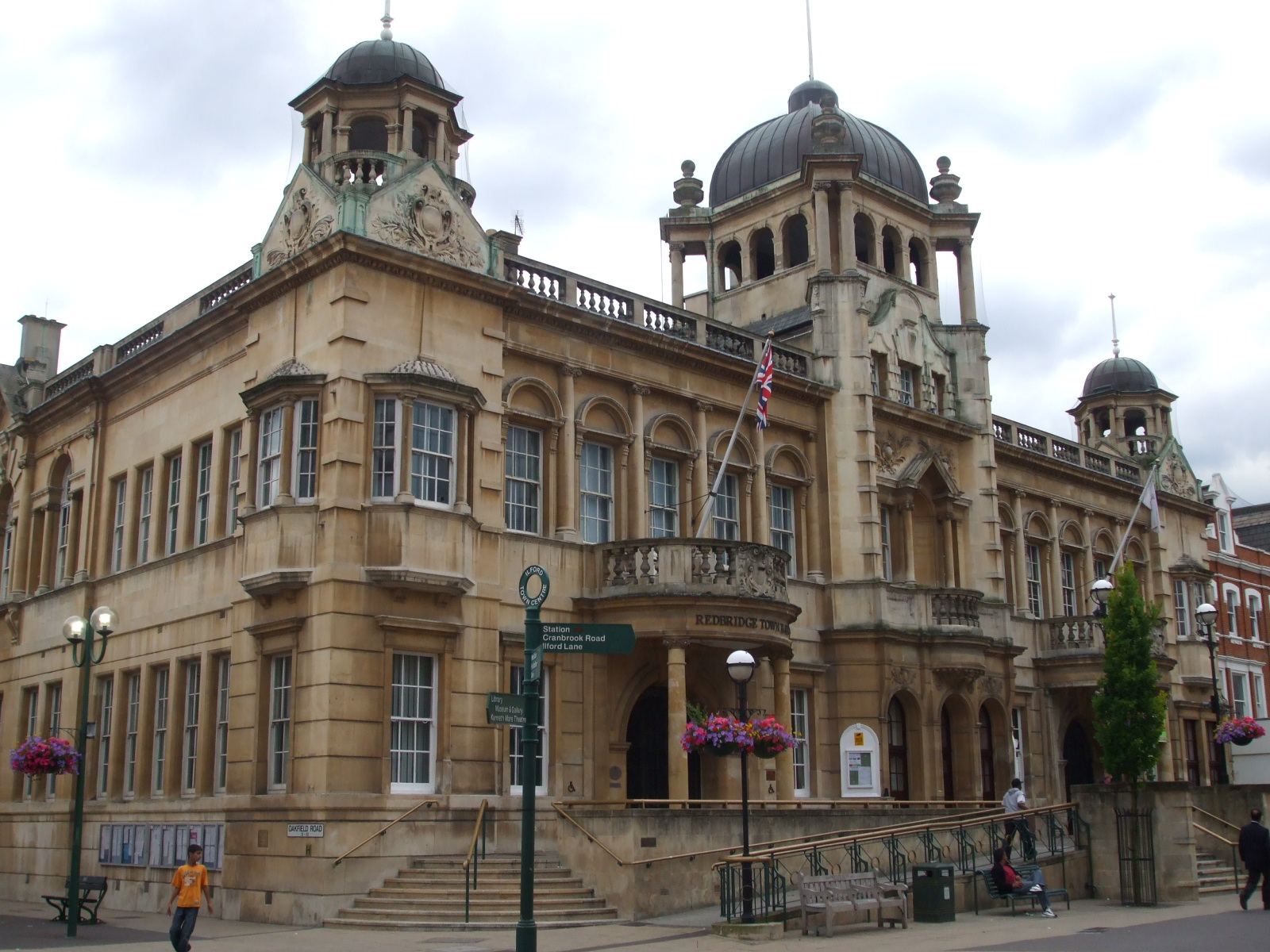
Redbridge Town Hall on Ilford High Road

The local authority is Redbridge Council, which meets at Redbridge Town Hall (formerly Ilford Town Hall) and has its main offices at the nearby Lynton House.

=== Greater London representation ===
Since 2000, for elections to the London Assembly, the borough forms part of the Havering and Redbridge constituency.

== Demographics ==
Population pyramid of Redbridge in 2021

In 2011 the population of Redbridge was recorded at 278,970. In common with the other London boroughs this continues a period of growth; between the 1991 and 2001 censuses the increase was 7.5% with a further rise of 15.3% by 2011. Redbridge has the third highest proportion of children and a higher-than-average proportion of older adults while the proportion of working age adults is slightly lower than average. The population density was last recorded at 4,945 residents per km^{2}(the London regional density is 5,199, far higher than the England and Wales figure of 371).

The healthy life expectancy (HLE) at birth for Redbridge residents stands at 65.5 years for males and 62.4 years for females (the England average HLE is 63.4 for males and 64.1 for females).

Redbridge is one of the most ethnically diverse local authority areas in the UK. 34% of respondents to the 2011 census stated that they were born outside the UK and 65.5% identified as belonging to an ethnic group other than white British. Redbridge's largest ethnic group is White British (34.5%), followed by Indian (16.4%), and Pakistani (Redbridge has the highest proportion of Pakistani residents of any London borough).

Population census
Year	Pop.	±%
1801	4,909	—
1811	6,317	+28.7%
1821	7,829	+23.9%
1831	8,572	+9.5%
1841	9,290	+8.4%
1851	9,921	+6.8%
1861	16,409	+65.4%
1871	22,897	+39.5%
1881	29,385	+28.3%
1891	51,250	+74.4%
1901	77,621	+51.5%
1911	117,735	+51.7%
1921	152,209	+29.3%
1931	196,790	+29.3%
1941	230,876	+17.3%
1951	270,876	+17.3%
1961	254,605	−6.0%
1971	239,337	−6.0%
1981	224,724	−6.1%
1991	231,198	+2.9%
2001	238,628	+3.2%
2011	278,970	+16.9%
2021	310,261	+11.2%
2024 estimate	321,231	+3.5%
Note: 2024 estimate

=== Ethnic and religious change ===
In common with many London boroughs, the 2011 census showed notable ethnic and religious population mobility in Redbridge. Ethnic groups whose proportions fell in Redbridge were White British (-23% of the borough's total), Irish (-0.9%), and Caribbean (-0.6%). Ethnic groups whose proportions rose include Pakistani (+4.9%), other Asians (+4.4%), Bangladeshis (+3.9%), and other White (+2.9%). Religious groups whose proportions fell in Redbridge were Christian (-13.9%) and Jews (-2.5%). For Jews this represented a fall of over 50% of their number in some wards. Religious groups whose proportions rose include Muslims (+11.4%) followed by Hindu (+3.6%).

=== Ethnicity ===
Ethnic makeup of Redbridge by single year ages in 2021

Ethnic Group	Year											
Ethnic Group	1971 estimations		1981 estimations		1991 census		2001 census		2011 census		2021 census	
Ethnic Group	Number	%	Number	%	Number	%	Number	%	Number	%	Number	%
White: Total	–	96.3%	199,984	88%	181,134	78.3%	151,587	63.5%	118,646	42.6%	107,974	34.9%
White: British	–	–	–	–	–	–	137,097	57.5%	96,253	34.5%	71,844	23.2%
White: Irish	–	–	–	–	–	–	5,559	2.3%	3,900	1.4%	3,092	1.0%
White: Gypsy or Irish Traveller	–	–	–	–	–	–	–	–	140	0.1%	185	0.1%
White: Roma	–	–	–	–	–	–	–	–	–	–	1,104	0.4%
White: Other	–	–	–	–	–	–	8,931	3.7%	18,353	6.6%	31,749	10.2%
Asian or Asian British: Total	–	–	19,451	8.5%	37,177	16.1%	61,585	25.8%	116,503	41.7%	146,833	47.3%
Asian or Asian British: Indian	–	–	13,130		24,078		33,304	14.0%	45,660	16.4%	51,183	16.5%
Asian or Asian British: Pakistani	–	–	3,475		6,552		14,888	6.2%	31,051	11.1%	44,000	14.2%
Asian or Asian British: Bangladeshi	–	–	702		1,976		4,224	1.8%	16,011	5.7%	31,895	10.3%
Asian or Asian British: Chinese	–	–	873		1,574		1,962	0.8%	3,000	1.1%	2,918	0.9%
Asian or Asian British: Other Asian	–	–	1,271		2,997		7,207	3.0%	20,781	7.4%	16,837	5.4%
Black or Black British: Total	–	–	5,877	2.6%	9,863	4.2%	18,112	7.6%	24,845	8.8%	26,096	8.4%
Black or Black British: African	–	–	1,410		2,545		7,827	3.3%	12,357	4.4%	14,573	4.7%
Black or Black British: Caribbean	–	–	3,372		5,691		9,126	3.8%	9,064	3.2%	8,452	2.7%
Black or Black British: Other Black	–	–	1,095		1,627		1,159	0.5%	3,424	1.2%	3,071	1.0%
Mixed or British Mixed: Total	–	–	–	–	–	–	5,831	4.2%	11,456	4.1%	12,736	4.2%
Mixed: White and Black Caribbean	–	–	–	–	–	–	1,884	1.5%	3,204	1.1%	3,154	1.0%
Mixed: White and Black African	–	–	–	–	–	–	742	0.8%	1,692	0.6%	1,717	0.6%
Mixed: White and Asian	–	–	–	–	–	–	1,853	0.8%	3,251	1.2%	3,577	1.2%
Mixed: Other Mixed	–	–	–	–	–	–	1,352	2.5%	3,309	1.2%	4,288	1.4%
Other: Total	–	–	1,837		3,025		1,520	0.6%	7,520	2.7%	16,622	5.3%
Other: Arab	–	–	–	–	–	–	–	–	1,551	0.6%	2,263	0.7%
Other: Any other ethnic group	–	–	–	–	–	–	1,520	0.6%	5,969	2.1%	14,359	4.6%
Ethnic minority: Total	–	3.7%	27,165	11.9%	50,065	21.7%	87,048	36.5%	160,324	57.3%	202,287	65.1%
Total	–	100%	227,149	100%	231,199	100%	238,635	100.00%	278,970	100.00%	310,261	100%

=== Religious diversity ===
Religious make up of Redbridge by single year age groups in 2021

Religion in Redbridge
Religion	Per cent(%)
Muslim	31.3%
Christian	30.4%
No religion	12.6%
Hindu	11.1%
Undeclared	5.7%
Sikh	5.7%
Jewish	2.1%
Other	0.7%
Buddhist	0.5%

According to the 2021 Census, the largest religious groupings are Muslims (31.3 per cent), followed by Christians (30.4 per cent), those of no religion (12.6 per cent), Hindus (11.1 per cent) no response (5.7 per cent), Sikhs (5.7 per cent), Jews (2.1 per cent), Buddhists (0.5 per cent) and other religions at (0.7 per cent).

The proportion of Christians residing in Redbridge in 2011 ranked fourth lowest in England and Wales, and 12 per cent below the London average of 48.4%. The number of Muslims in Redbridge has more than doubled since 2001.

Religion	2021	
Religion	Number	%
Christian	94,473	30,45%
Muslim	97,068	31,29%
Hindu	34,372	11,08%
Buddhist	1,611	0,52%
Sikh	17,622	5,68%
Jewish	6,412	2,07%
Other religion	2,028	0,65%
No religion	38,999	12,57%
Religion not stated	17,675	5,70%
Total	310,260	100%

=== Immigration ===
This list includes top-15 sources of immigration to Borough of Redbridge for 2021 census:

#	Country	Number
1	India	23,651
2	Pakistan	18,479
3	Bangladesh	14,099
4	Romania	11,099
5	Sri Lanka	6,866
6	Moldova	4,295
7	Italy	3,428
8	Kenya	3,425
9	Lithuania	3,087
10	Poland	2,583
11	Bulgaria	2,430
12	Nigeria	2,321
13	Ireland	2,043
14	Somalia	1,511
15	Mauritius	1,439

== Transport ==
=== Walking and cycling ===
The Roding Valley Way is a designated walking and cycling route between Woodford and Ilford.

=== Elizabeth line ===
Route	Frequency
Shenfield to London Liverpool Street	6 trains per hour

Station	Image	Opened	Notes
Ilford		20 June 1839	
Seven Kings		1 April 1899	
Goodmayes		18 February 1901	
Chadwell Heath		11 January 1864	

These services serving these stations were rebranded from TfL Rail to Elizabeth line in 2022.

=== London Underground ===
Central line: Epping Branch.

Station	Image	Opened	Notes
Snaresbrook		14 December 1947	First opened by the Eastern Counties Railway in 1856
South Woodford		14 December 1947	First opened by the Eastern Counties Railway as South Woodford (George Lane) in 1856; renamed 1947
Woodford		14 December 1947	First opened by the Eastern Counties Railway in 1856. Terminus of Hainault Loop

Central line: Hainault Loop (follows the route of the A12 from Wanstead to Newbury Park)

Station	Image	Opened	Notes
Wanstead		14 December 1947	
Redbridge		14 December 1947	
Gants Hill		14 December 1947	
Newbury Park		14 December 1947	First opened by the Great Eastern Railway in 1903
Barkingside		31 May 1948	First opened by the Great Eastern Railway in 1903
Fairlop		31 May 1948	First opened by the Great Eastern Railway in 1903
Hainault		31 May 1948	First opened by the Great Eastern Railway in 1903. Closed 1908 to 1930.
Grange Hill		21 November 1948	First opened by the Great Eastern Railway in 1903
Roding Valley		21 November 1948	First opened by the London & North Eastern Railway in 1936

=== Buses ===
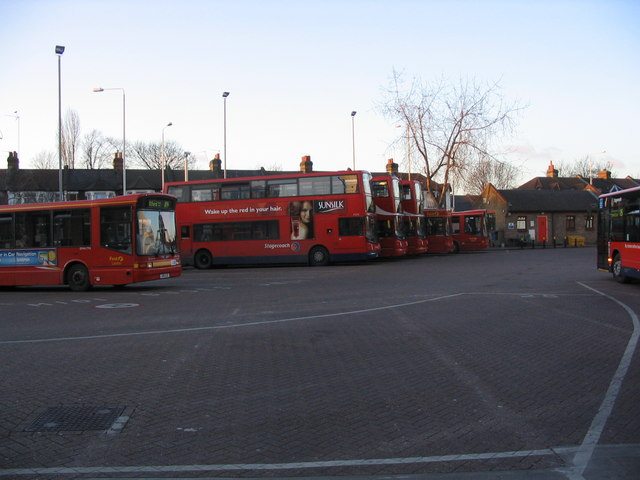
Ilford Hainault Street Bus Station, where nine different bus routes terminate.

Numerous London buses run through and within the borough.

=== Travel to work ===
In March 2011, the main forms of transport that residents used to travel to work were: driving a car or van, 23.5% all residents aged 16–74; underground, metro, light rail, tram, 18.4%; train, 6.2%; bus, minibus or coach, 4.6%; on foot, 3.7%; work mainly at or from home, 2.6%; passenger in a car or van, 1.5%.

== Education ==
Redbridge Council is the Local Education Authority. The Borough has the accolade of sending more young people to university than any other borough in the country in both 2011 and 2012. GCSE and A Level results are consistently higher than the Country's average. A 2017 report by Trust for London and the New Policy Institute found that Redbridge has the highest proportion of 19 year olds with Level 3 qualifications (equivalent to an A Level) of any London borough.

All schools in the borough take part in the Redbridge Schools Choral Festival, a bi-annual music festival held in the Royal Albert Hall in Knightsbridge.

== Sport and leisure facilities ==
Redbridge has a number of sports and leisure facilities including the road and off-road cycling tracks at Redbridge Cycling Centre.

There are two local football teams both playing in the Isthmian League Division One: Redbridge F.C. (not to be confused with Dagenham & Redbridge) and Ilford FC. In addition there is fellow Non-League football club Barkingside F.C. who play at The Oakside stadium.

Valentines Park in Ilford acted as one of Essex County Cricket Club's home grounds in 1923-4 and from 1935 until 2002, when the club stopped playing there due to financial constraints.

== Local media ==
The local newspaper is the Ilford Recorder.

Time 107.5 FM was a commercial radio station broadcasting nearby in Romford, to the local area, Time FM closed on 1 August 2025 becoming part of Nation Radio.

Bedrock Radio is a local community radio service based in the nearby Queen's Hospital in Romford.

The first Hospital Radio service In Redbridge was founded in 1975 as Goodmayes Hospital Radio Association with studios located within the old Goodmayes Hospital building. In 1993, the station expanded its coverage serving the neighbouring King George Hospital. In 2004 the station changed its on-air name to The Jumbo Sound, as it began broadcasting online to sever other locations operated by NEFLT NHS Trust. In 2015, while the station celebrated its 40th anniversary, a burst radiator caused a flood in the studio, forcing the station off-air, and volunteers agreed to merge with Bedrock Radio. The merge was completed In April 2016, creating a unified hospital radio service covering North East London.

Today, Bedrock Radio serves the local community by broadcasting online and served local hospitals of Queen's, King George & Goodmayes, Plus units and clinics locally. The station features information about the Hospitals, NHS services, promotes charitable and community organisations and has an extensive local events guide featuring community & non-profit events. Bedrock Radio also provides local news on-air covering East London and South Essex, the station has announced it will launch on a local DAB+ later in 2025.

== Gallery ==
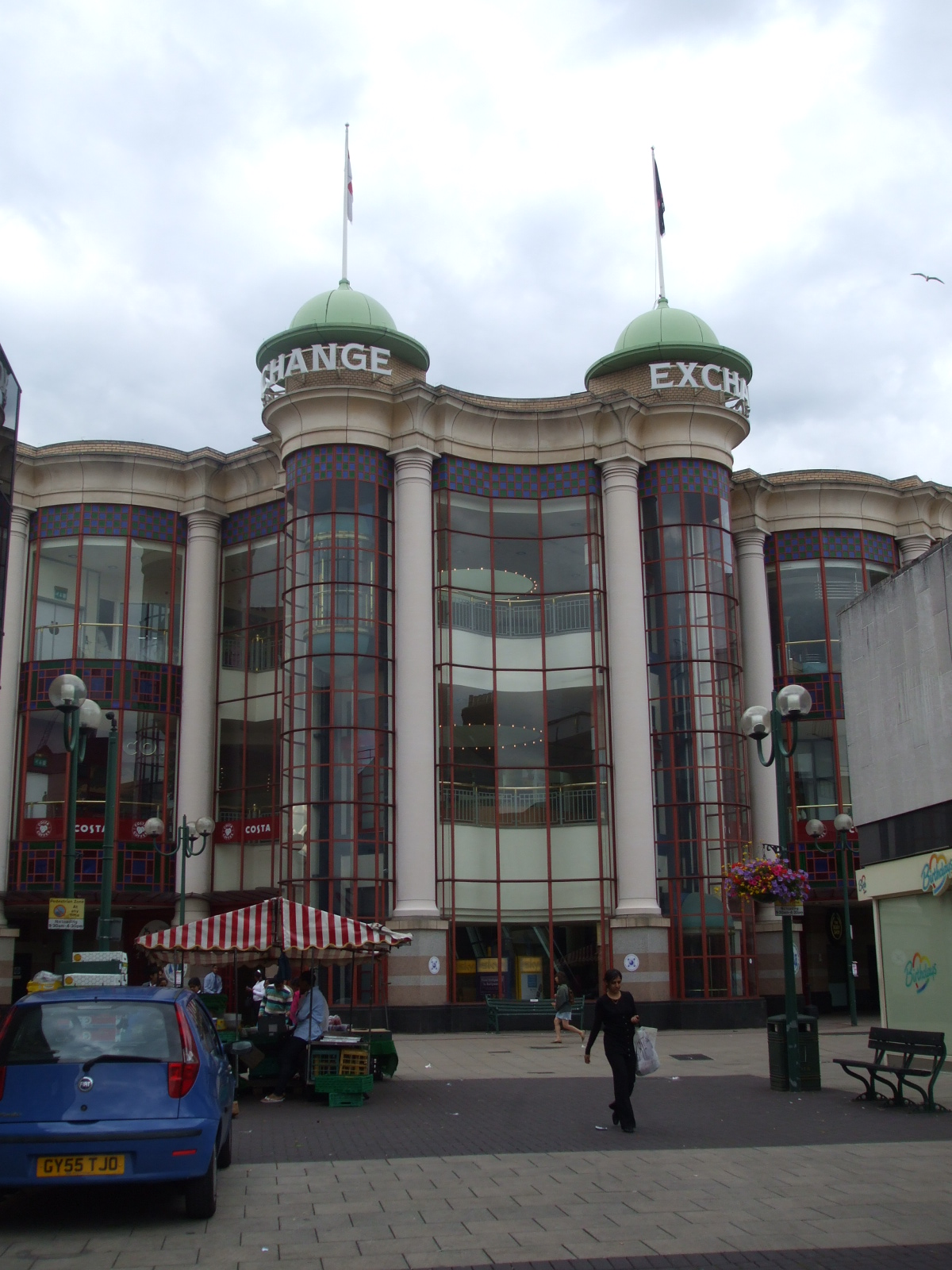
Exchange shopping centre, Ilford

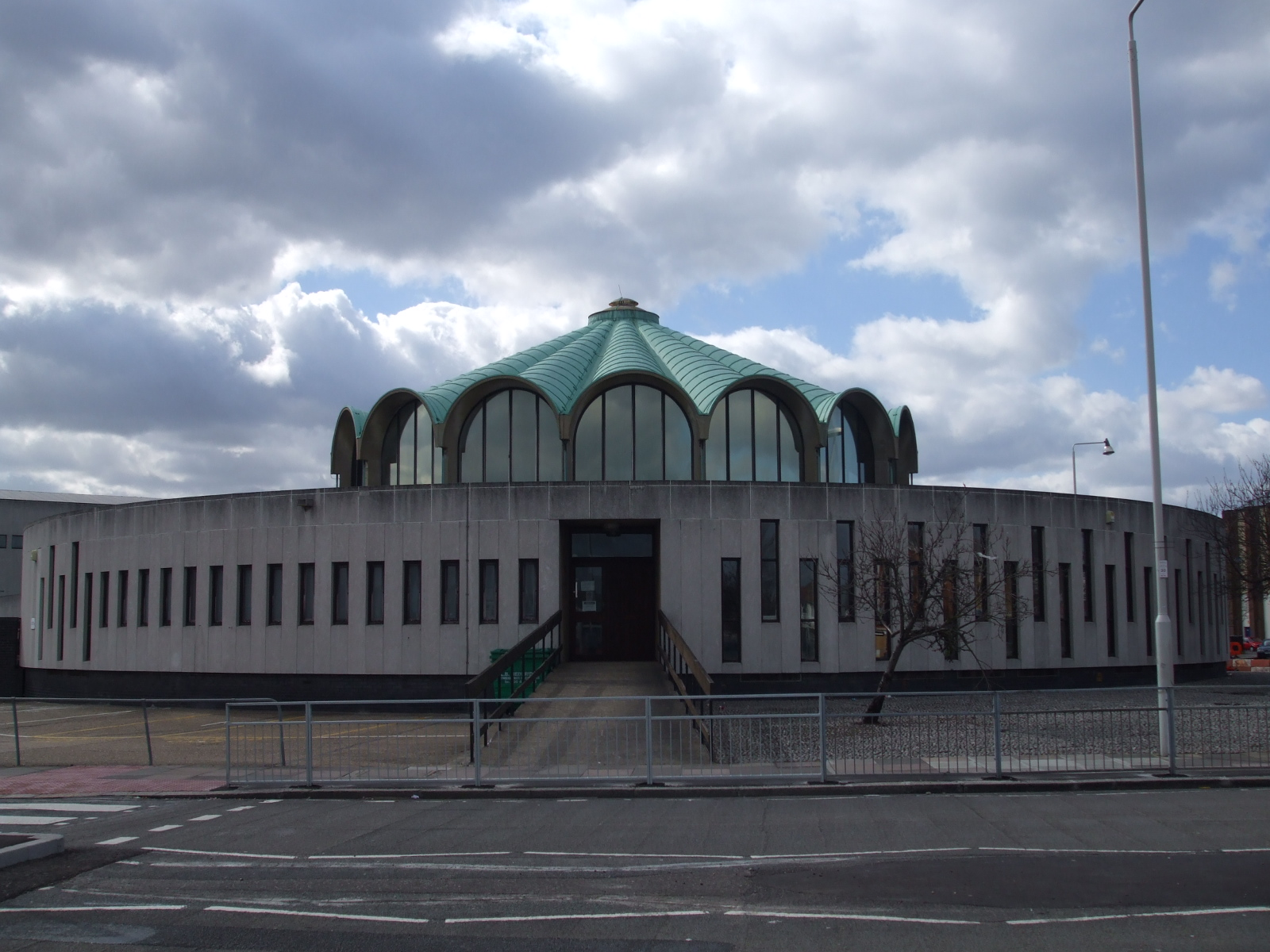
Fullwell Cross library, Barkingside

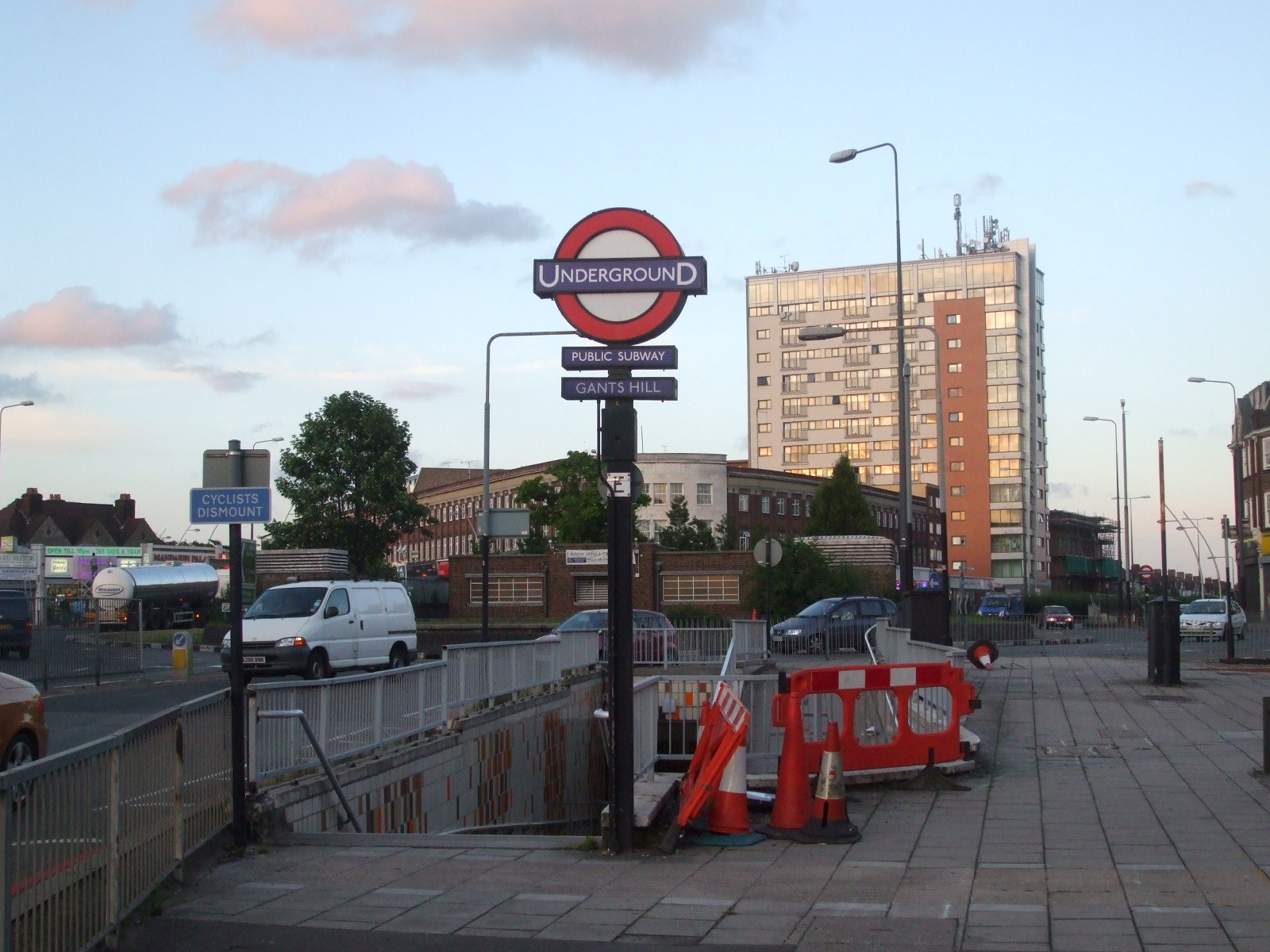
Gants Hill roundabout and station, Gants Hill

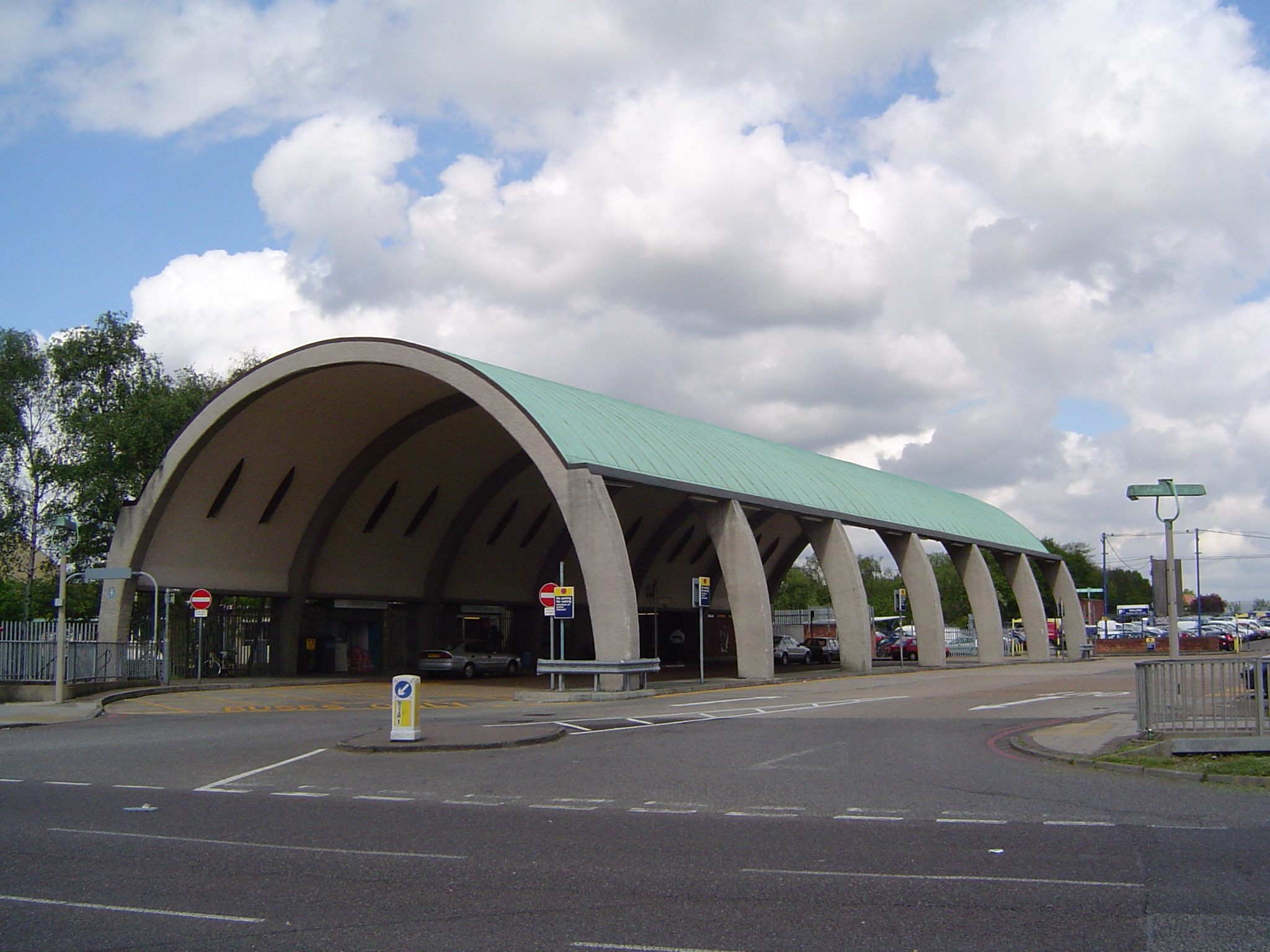
Newbury Park station, Newbury Park
