= Hainault tube station =

London Underground station

Hainault
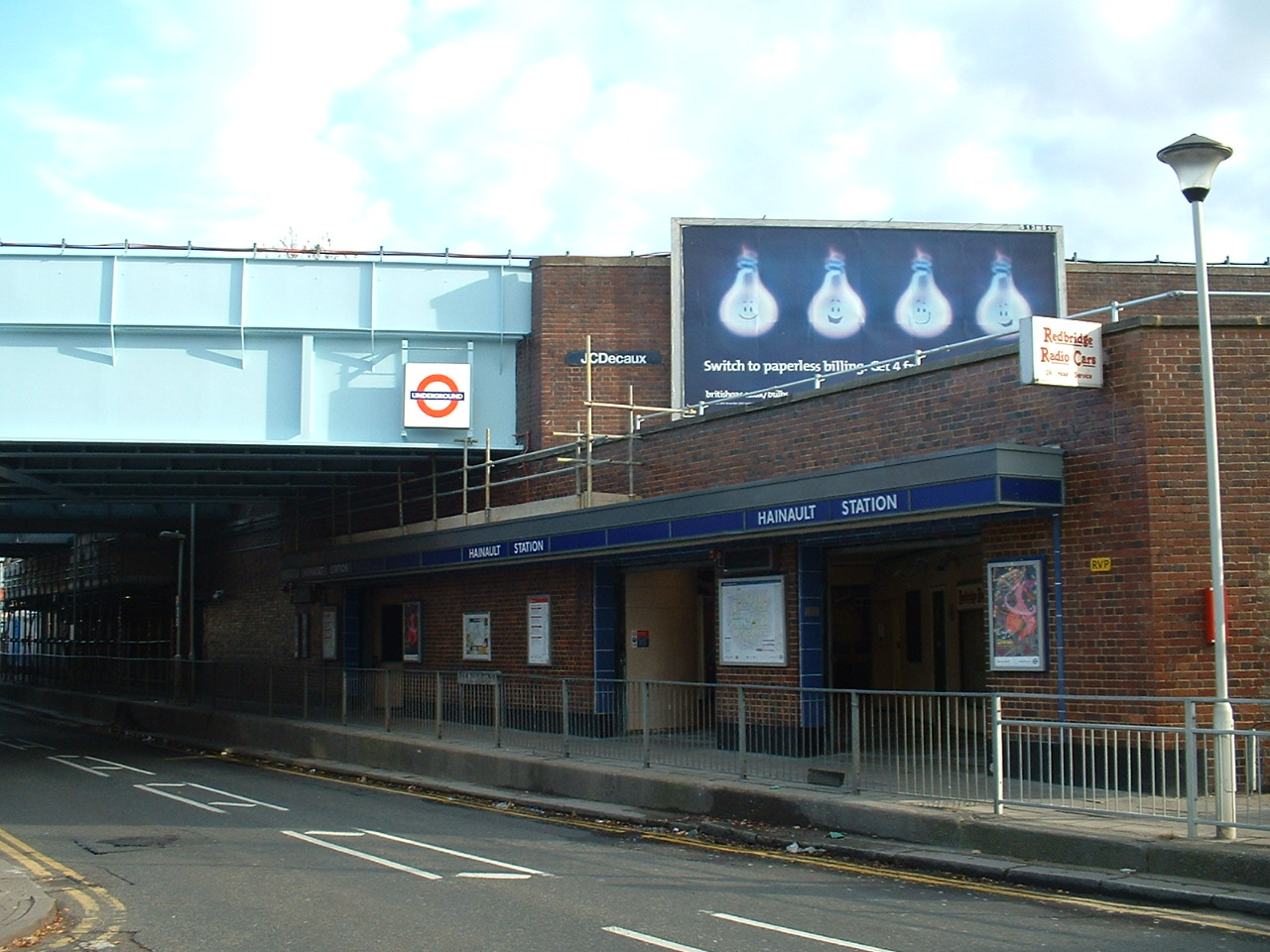
- Station entrance on New North Road
- Interactive map of Hainault

General information
- Location: Hainault
- Local authority: London Borough of Redbridge
- Managed by: London Underground
- Number of platforms: 3
- Accessible: Yes
- Fare zone: 4

London Underground annual entry and exit
- 2021: ▼1.73 million
- 2022: ▲2.80 million
- 2023: ▲2.86 million
- 2024: ▲2.90 million
- 2025: ▼2.84 million

Railway companies
- Original company: Great Eastern Railway
- Pre-grouping: Great Eastern Railway
- Post-grouping: London and North Eastern Railway

Key dates
- 1 May 1903: Opened (GER)
- 1 October 1908: Closed (GER)
- 2 March 1930: Reopened (LNER)
- 29 November 1947: Closed (LNER)
- 31 May 1948: Opened as terminus (Central line)
- 21 November 1948: Became through station

Other information
- External links: TfL station info page
- Coordinates: 51.6033°N 0.0933°E

Hainault (/ˈheɪnɔːt/, /-ɒlt/) is a London Underground station, located in Hainault in east London. It is on the Hainault loop of the Central line, between Fairlop and Grange Hill stations. It is in London fare zone 4, and is home to one of the three Central line depots.

== History ==
The station was opened on 1 May 1903 as part of the Great Eastern Railway's (GER) Fairlop Loop branch line from Woodford to Ilford. The line was designed to stimulate suburban growth, but Hainault station was closed on 1 October 1908 due to a lack of custom and did not reopen until 2 March 1930. In 1923, under the Railways Act 1921, the GER was merged with other railway companies to form the London and North Eastern Railway (LNER). As part of the 1935–1940 New Works Programme of the London Passenger Transport Board, the majority of the loop was transferred from the LNER to form the eastern extensions of the Central line. Although work commenced in 1938, it was suspended upon the outbreak of the Second World War in 1939 and only recommenced in 1946.

Steam train services serving Hainault were suspended on 29 November 1947. From 14 December 1947, the line from Newbury Park to Hainault was electrified to allow empty train movements to the new depot at Hainault. Electrified Central line passenger services, to Central London via Gants Hill, finally commenced on 31 May 1948. The services to Woodford via Grange Hill were reintroduced on 21 November 1948.

Alterations at Hainault included a new island platform on the west side of the station, to allow the bulk of services via Gants Hill to be terminated there as well as allowing access to Hainault Depot. Situated to the north of the station, Hainault is the major train depot at the eastern end of the line. The depot building was completed in 1939 but was used by the US Army Transportation Corps until 1945. It came into use for Central line stock on 14 December 1947.

From the mid-1960s until the early 1990s, the Woodford-Hainault section was largely operated separately from the rest of the Central line, using four-car (later three-car) trains of 1960 Stock. The three-car units had a middle carriage of 1938 tube stock. The trains were adapted for Automatic Train Operation (ATO), and the Woodford-Hainault section became the testing ground for ATO on the Victoria line. Some Victoria line 1967 Stock trains were also used to operate that section and named FACT (Fully Automatic Controlled Train). That separate operation has now been discontinued, the 1960 Stock has been withdrawn, and through trains to Central London now operate via Hainault. The 1960 Stock, along with the rest of the Central line's 1962 Stock, has been superseded by trains of 1992 Stock.

== Station improvements ==
The station has recently been the focus of a refurbishment programme. The ticket office has been refurbished, a new Station Supervisor's Office in the ticket hall was completed in June 2009 and lifts have been installed to allow step-free access to the platforms. The lifts are the shallowest on the London Underground network, having a descent of just 18 inches (460 mm).

== Services ==
Hainault station is on its loop of the Central line in London fare zone 4. It is between Fairlop and Grange Hill. The typical off-peak service in trains per hour (tph) is:

- 3 tph northbound to Woodford
- 6 tph southbound to Ealing Broadway via Newbury Park
- 3 tph southbound to White City

A 24-hour Night Tube service began on the Central line on 19 August 2016, running on Friday and Saturday nights. Night tube services are:

- 3 tph eastbound between Ealing Broadway and Hainault (via Newbury Park)
- 3 tph southbound between Hainault and White City (via Newbury Park)

Hainault is half a mile (800 m) from Fairlop Station, which can be seen from the platforms by looking down the line. Central line trains take just 65 seconds on average to travel between the two stations. However the minimum walking or driving distance between the two stations is considerably longer.

Preceding station	London Underground	Following station
Fairlop towards Ealing Broadway or West Ruislip	Central line via Hainault loop	Grange Hill towards Woodford
Fairlop towards Ealing Broadway or West Ruislip	Central line via Hainault loop	Terminus

== Connections ==
Daytime bus routes 150 and 247 and night bus N8 London Bus route serve the station.

== Bibliography ==
- Connor, J E (2007). Branch Line to Ongar. Middleton Press. ISBN 978-1-906008-05-5.
