= Gants Hill tube station =

London Underground station

Gants Hill
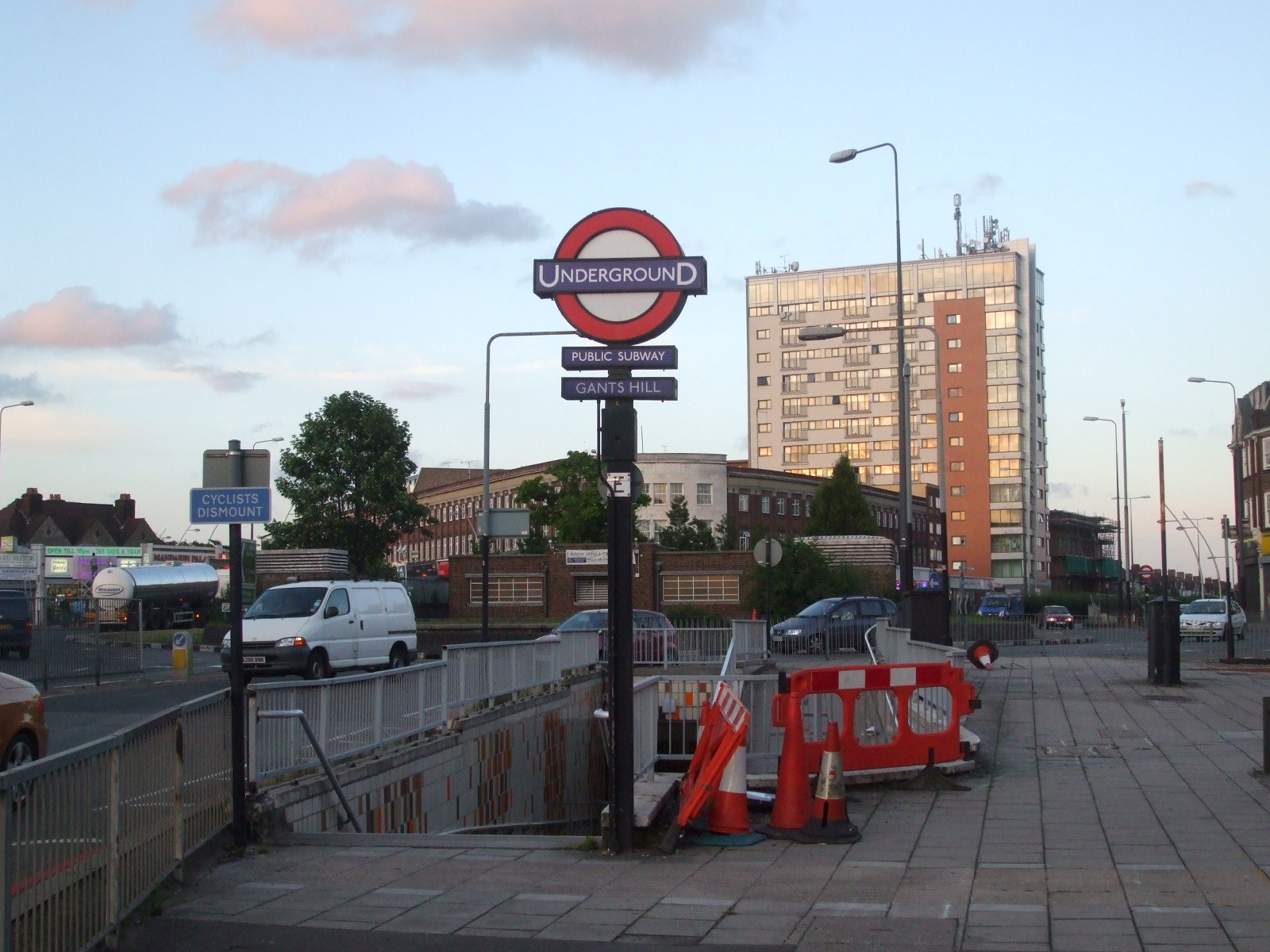
- South-west entrance in 2008
- Interactive map of Gants Hill

General information
- Location: Gants Hill
- Local authority: London Borough of Redbridge
- Managed by: London Underground
- Number of platforms: 2
- Fare zone: 4

London Underground annual entry and exit
- 2021: ▼2.84 million
- 2022: ▲4.75 million
- 2023: ▲4.78 million
- 2024: ▼4.68 million
- 2025: ▼4.59 million

Key dates
- 1942–1945: Tunnels used by Plessey as a munitions factory during the war
- 14 December 1947: Opened

Other information
- External links: TfL station info page
- Coordinates: 51.57666°N 0.06611°E

Gants Hill is a London Underground station in the largely residential Gants Hill district of Ilford, in east London, England. It is on the Hainault loop of the Central line between Redbridge and Newbury Park stations. It is the easternmost station on the network that is underground and is located in London fare zone 4.

The station ticket hall is located beneath Gants Hill roundabout and reached via pedestrian subways. It opened on 14 December 1947 as an extension of the Central line to form the new phase of the Hainault loop. The station is known for its distinctive architecture featuring barrel-vaulted halls at platform level designed and created by Charles Holden.

== History ==
As part of the 1935–40 New Works Programme, the Central line was to be extended from Liverpool Street to south of Leyton. From there, it would connect to and take over passenger operations on the London & North Eastern Railway's (LNER's) suburban branch to Epping and Ongar in Essex. The section of the LNER's Fairlop Loop (now known as Hainault Loop) between Woodford and Newbury Park was also to be transferred, though not the section south from Newbury Park to Ilford and Seven Kings on the Great Eastern Main Line.

To replace the truncated route south from Newbury Park, a new underground section between Leytonstone and Newbury Park was constructed, running mostly under Eastern Avenue. Three new stations, which include Gants Hill were built to serve the new suburbs of north Ilford and the Fairlop Loop. (Note: South of Newbury Park, the west-facing junction with the Great Eastern Main Line closed in 1947 to allow the expansion of Ilford carriage depot while Seven Kings Junction was closed in 1956.) During planning, the names "North Ilford" and "Cranbrook" were considered for this station.

Construction began before 1937 and most of the tunnelled section was completed by 1940 but delayed due to the outbreak of the Second World War and eventually came to a halt in June 1940. During the war, the station was used as an air raid shelter and the unused tunnels between the station and Redbridge were used as a munitions factory for Plessey. (Note: The factory opened in March 1942 which provided employment for 2,000 people; production lasted until 1945. The factory extended almost 5 miles with about 300,000 sq. ft. of space.) Construction restarted after the war ended, with the line extended to Stratford on 4 December 1946, and then to Leytonstone on 5 May 1947. Gants Hill station opened on 14 December 1947 as part of an extension to Newbury Park. (Note: Leytonstone to Woodford (via South Woodford) opened on the same day, forming two branches in the eastern region of the Central line.)

== Design ==
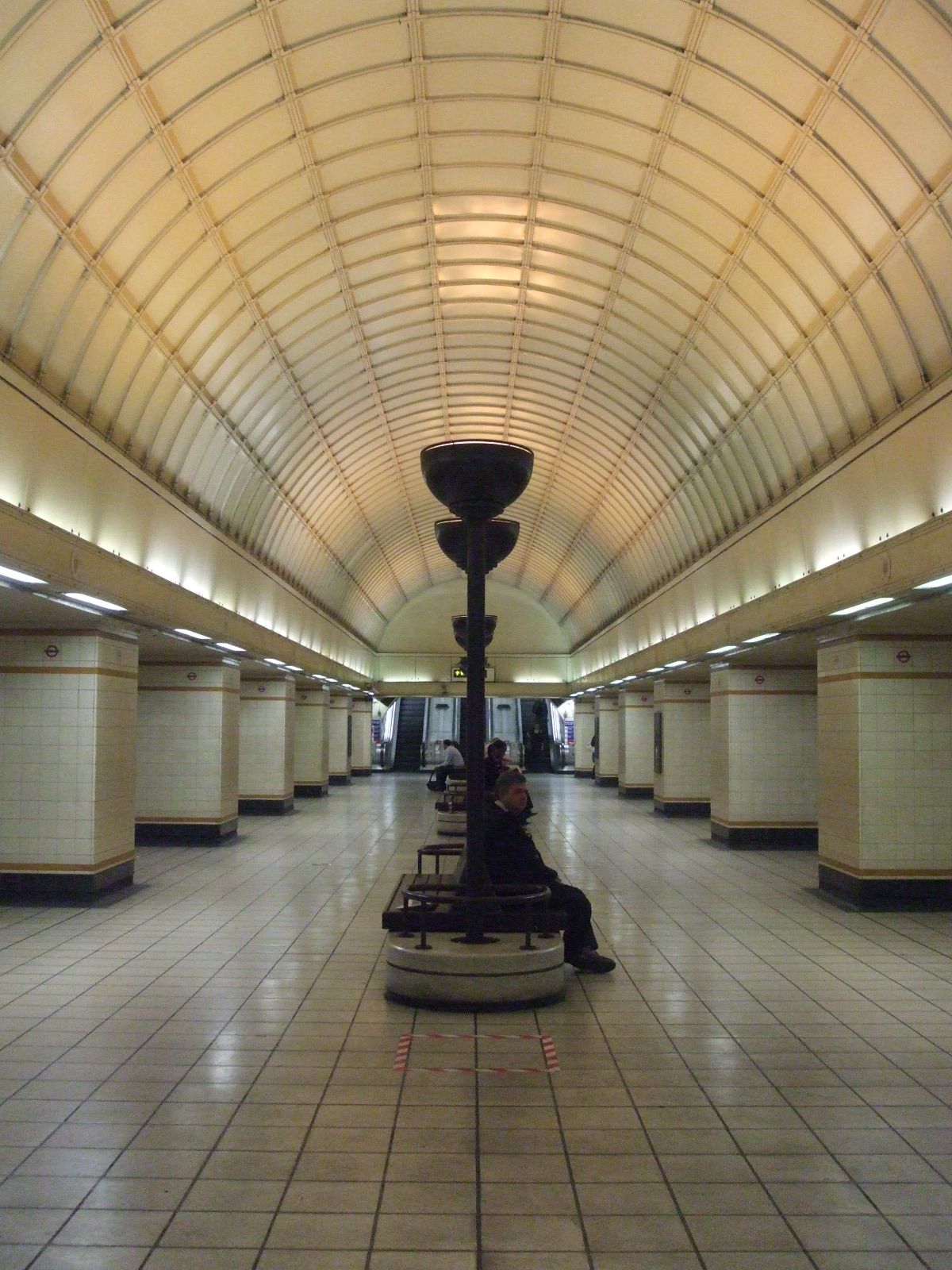
The lower concourse, with its design inspired by stations on the Moscow Metro

The station, like the other two new stations on the branch, was designed by architect Charles Holden in the 1930s. During the 1930s the London Passenger Transport Board had provided advice on the construction of the Moscow Metro and an internal report in 1935 by the Underground's engineers on the Soviet Union capital's system led to the decision to construct a station in London to a similar design. (Note: Stations on the original section of the Moscow Metro opened in 1935 that have a similar design include Krasnye Vorota, Okhotny Ryad and Chistyye Prudy.)

The station ticket hall is located beneath the roundabout at the centre of the road junction. It is accessed via a series of pedestrian subways. It has no street level buildings, although low structures on the roundabout sit above the ticket hall and provide daylight and ventilation. From the ticket hall, three escalators lead to the barrel-vaulted lower concourse between the two platforms tunnels. The station also features miniature roundels on the tiles at platform level as well as the roundel clocks.

Gants Hill is the only Underground station with a concourse designed by Holden that has no surface buildings. (Note: All other station designs have at least a surface building, which include Sudbury Town on the Piccadilly Line and South Wimbledon on the Northern Line.) Unlike Redbridge, the station is not Grade II listed although its distinctive architectural qualities have gained public support for listing the station.

== Location ==
The station has taken its name from the Gants Hill roundabout, where the name could have originated from the le Gant family who were notable as stewards. The ticket hall is directly underneath the roundabout, located in the heart of Gants Hill district. The roundabout connects to Woodford Avenue, Eastern Avenue and Cranbrook Road. The station serves a mainly residential area and lies near to Valentines Park, Valentines High School, and Faces nightclub. It is the easternmost station to be below ground on the London Underground network

London Buses routes 66, 123, 128, 150, 167, 179, 296, 396, 462, school routes 667, 677, 679, Superloop express routes SL2 and SL12, and night route N8 serve the station.

== Services ==
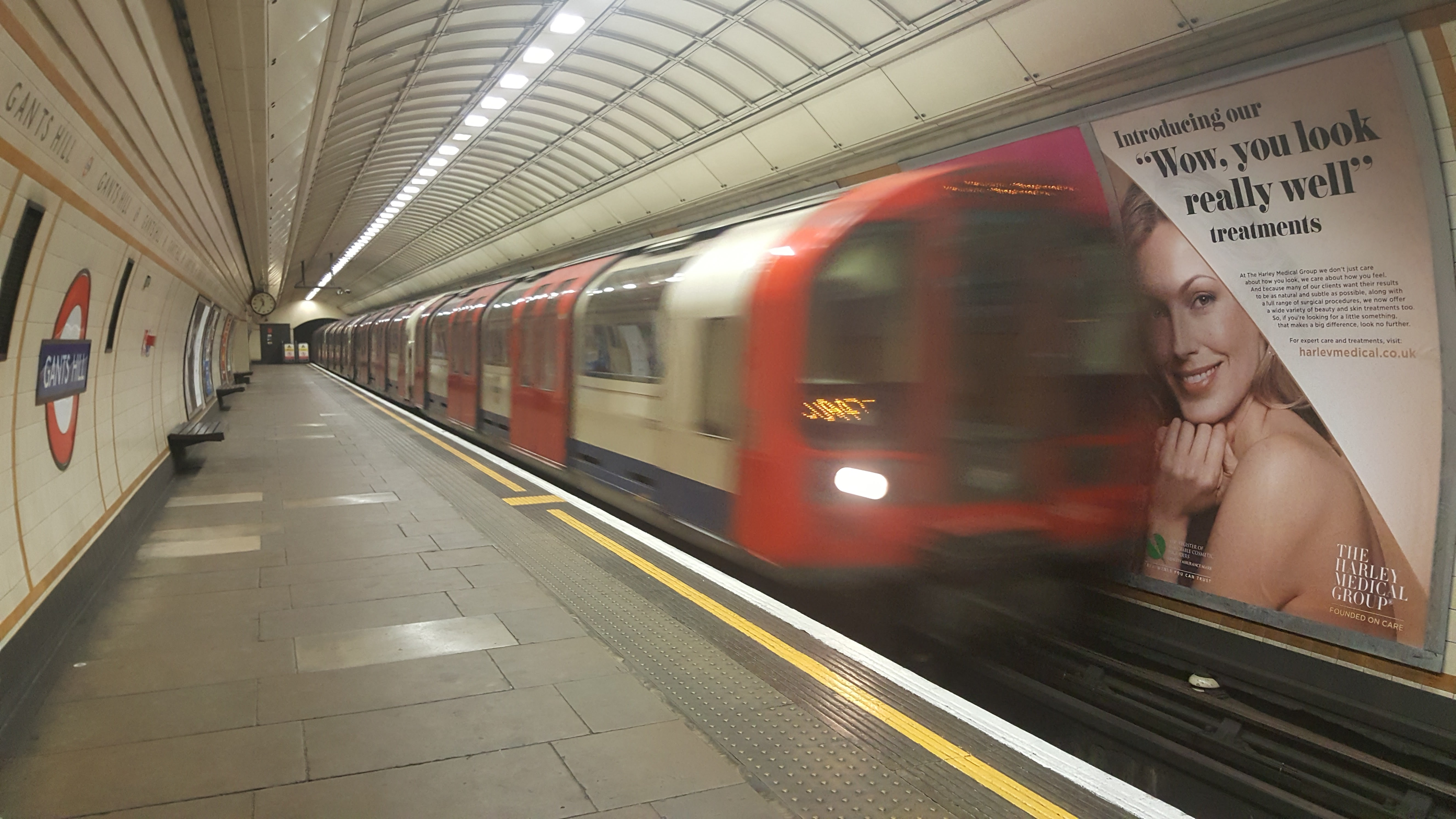
The station platform

Gants Hill station is on the Hainault loop of the Central line between Redbridge and Newbury Park. Train frequencies vary throughout the day, but generally operate every 3–4 minutes between 05:23 and 23:57 westbound and 06:25 and 01:03 eastbound.

Trains generally run between Hainault and Ealing Broadway via Newbury Park. The typical off-peak service, in trains per hour as of 2018 is:

- 9tph eastbound to Hainault, via Newbury Park
- 3tph eastbound to Newbury Park
- 9tph westbound to Ealing Broadway
- 3tph westbound to White City

The typical Night Tube service, in trains per hour as of 2018 is:

- 3tph eastbound to Hainault, via Newbury Park
- 3tph westbound to White City

Preceding station	London Underground	Following station
Redbridge towards Ealing Broadway or West Ruislip	Central line via Hainault loop	Newbury Park towards Hainault or Woodford
