= Newbury Park tube station =

London Underground station

Newbury Park
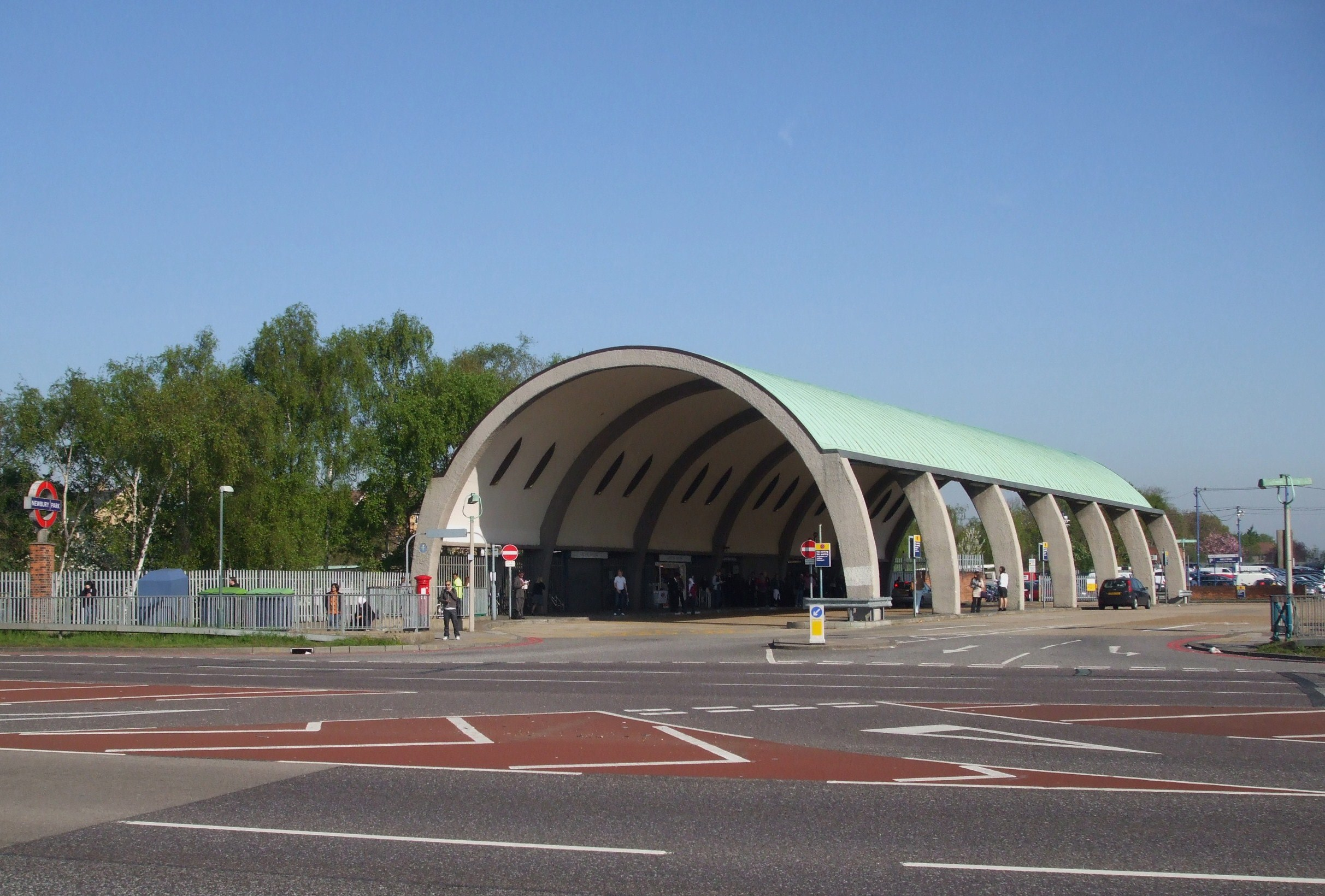
- Grade II listed bus shelter
- Interactive map of Newbury Park

General information
- Location: Newbury Park
- Local authority: London Borough of Redbridge
- Managed by: London Underground
- Number of platforms: 2
- Accessible: Yes
- Fare zone: 4

London Underground annual entry and exit
- 2021: ▼2.22 million
- 2022: ▲3.53 million
- 2023: ▼3.37 million
- 2024: ▼3.17 million
- 2025: ▼3.01 million

Key dates
- 1 May 1903: Opened (GER)
- 1923: GER services ceased, LNER services started
- 29 November 1947: Closed (LNER)
- 14 December 1947: Opened as terminus (Central line)
- 31 May 1948: Became through station
- 4 October 1965: Goods yard closed

Listed status
- Listed feature: Bus shelter
- Listing grade: II
- Entry number: 1081019
- Added to list: 19 March 1981

Other information
- External links: TfL station info page
- Coordinates: 51°34′32″N 00°05′24″E

Newbury Park is a London Underground station in Newbury Park, Ilford. It is on the Hainault loop of the Central line, between Gants Hill and Barkingside stations. It is in London fare zone 4.

The station was initially opened by the Great Eastern Railway on 1 May 1903 and subsequently transferred its services to the London and North Eastern Railway due to the amalgamation. Underground trains only started serving the station on 14 December 1947, operating via the Gants Hill tunnel. The line was extended to Hainault on 31 May 1948. The Grade II listed bus shelter designed by Oliver Hill opened on 6 July 1949. Lifts were fully installed at Newbury Park in November 2018 to provide step-free access to the station, approximately 10 years after TfL abandoned the project.

== Geography ==
Newbury Park station is located in Newbury Park (in 1903 known as the Horns) of northeastern Ilford in the London Borough of Redbridge. It was built to serve the growing neighbourhood of Newbury Park where the earliest settlement, Birkbeck Estate, dates back to the 1880s. When Eastern Avenue was completed through Newbury Park as a bypass in 1920, development sprung-up around the area. Nearby landmarks include Oaks Park High School, Aldborough Primary School, St. Theresa Roman Catholic Church, Ilford War Memorial Gardens and Holiday Inn Express Hotel.

Newbury Park station has two car parks; one connects to King George Avenue and the other to Eastern Avenue. Entrance to the station is via the bus shelter.

== History ==
Newbury Park originally opened on 1 May 1903, as part of a Great Eastern Railway (GER) branch line from Woodford to Ilford via Hainault, known as the Fairlop Loop (now known as Hainault loop). (Note: The line initial operated as a goods service on 20 April 1903.) This line, designed to stimulate suburban growth, had chequered success. In the 1920s, only areas such as Newbury Park were decently populated. (Note: As a result, Hainault station was closed in 1920 and reopened in 1930.) As a consequence of the Railways Act 1921, the GER was merged with other railway companies in 1923 to become part of the London & North Eastern Railway (LNER). A new station building was built by the LNER which replaced the original GER building.

As part of the 1935–1940 "New Works Programme" of the London Passenger Transport Board, the majority of the loop, including the station, was to be transferred to form part of the eastern extensions of the Central line. Although work commenced in 1938, it was suspended upon the outbreak of the Second World War in 1939 and work only recommenced in 1945. This involved the construction of a new tube tunnel from Leytonstone via Redbridge which surfaced at Newbury Park to connect with the lines of the existing Ilford to Woodford branch. During the war, a part of the constructed tunnel system was used as an underground aircraft munitions factory, and was used as an air raid shelter. (Note: The factory, located between Gants Hill and Redbridge opened in March 1942 which provided employment for 2,000 people; production lasted until 1945. The factory extended almost 5 miles with about 300,000 sq. ft. of space.)

Steam train services serving Newbury Park were permanently suspended after 29 November 1947. Electrified Central line passenger services to Central London via Gants Hill finally commenced on 14 December 1947. (Note: Leytonstone to Woodford (via South Woodford) opened on the same day, forming two branches in the eastern region of the Central line. A replacement bus service operated between Woodford and Ilford via Hainault when steam train services ceased. It was cut back to Newbury Park when these extensions opened.) Lord Ashfield, former chairman of the London Passenger Transport Board, and local dignitaries attended the opening ceremony of the extension. A train crew depot was established on 30 November 1947 but closed on 2 November 1953. In addition, the line beyond, to the new Hainault depot, was electrified for empty train movements. The station ceased to be the temporary terminus of the Central line on 31 May 1948 with passenger services to Hainault station reopened. The surface tracks from Newbury Park to Ilford were severed by the expansion of Ilford Carriage Sheds in 1947, whilst those to Seven Kings were severed in 1956. The former alignment was in a cutting which was filled in and subsequently provided land for allotment gardens and housing. Three road bridges (Vicarage Lane, Benton Road and Wards Road) spanning an apparently missing alignment are the only clues to the old railway. (Note: South of Newbury Park, the row of houses and allotment gardens follow the alignment of the old railway and ends near the demolished Ilford and Seven Kings junction, seen on the map.)

Goods services used to run from the station via Woodford to Temple Mills, reversed via a turn-back siding south of the station until 1965, and by Underground engineering trains until 1992 when it was finally abandoned. An unelectrified track existed next to the 9 sidings which was a reception track to Barkingside goods yard. With the freight yard closed on 4 October 1965, these were demolished on 12 October 1969.

North of the station, the tracks were rearranged upon transfer to London Underground such that the existing tracks were separated further apart, where the former through eastbound track became a reversing siding, though retaining the connection towards Barkingside, whilst through trains use a track formerly part of the sidings and freight yard built to the west of the running lines. The northern end of the platforms were truncated to facilitate insertion of the points-work for the re-arrangement. Nine stabling sidings were added to the northwest of the station, connected to the westbound track via a flat crossing and another reversing siding in between the through tracks in autumn 1947. These did not last: The Hainault depot having fully opened in 1948, seven sidings were abandoned on 25 September 1949, and were closed and demolished on 30 January 1955. The remaining two were abandoned on 24 January 1966 and demolished on 12 October 1969.

== Station features ==
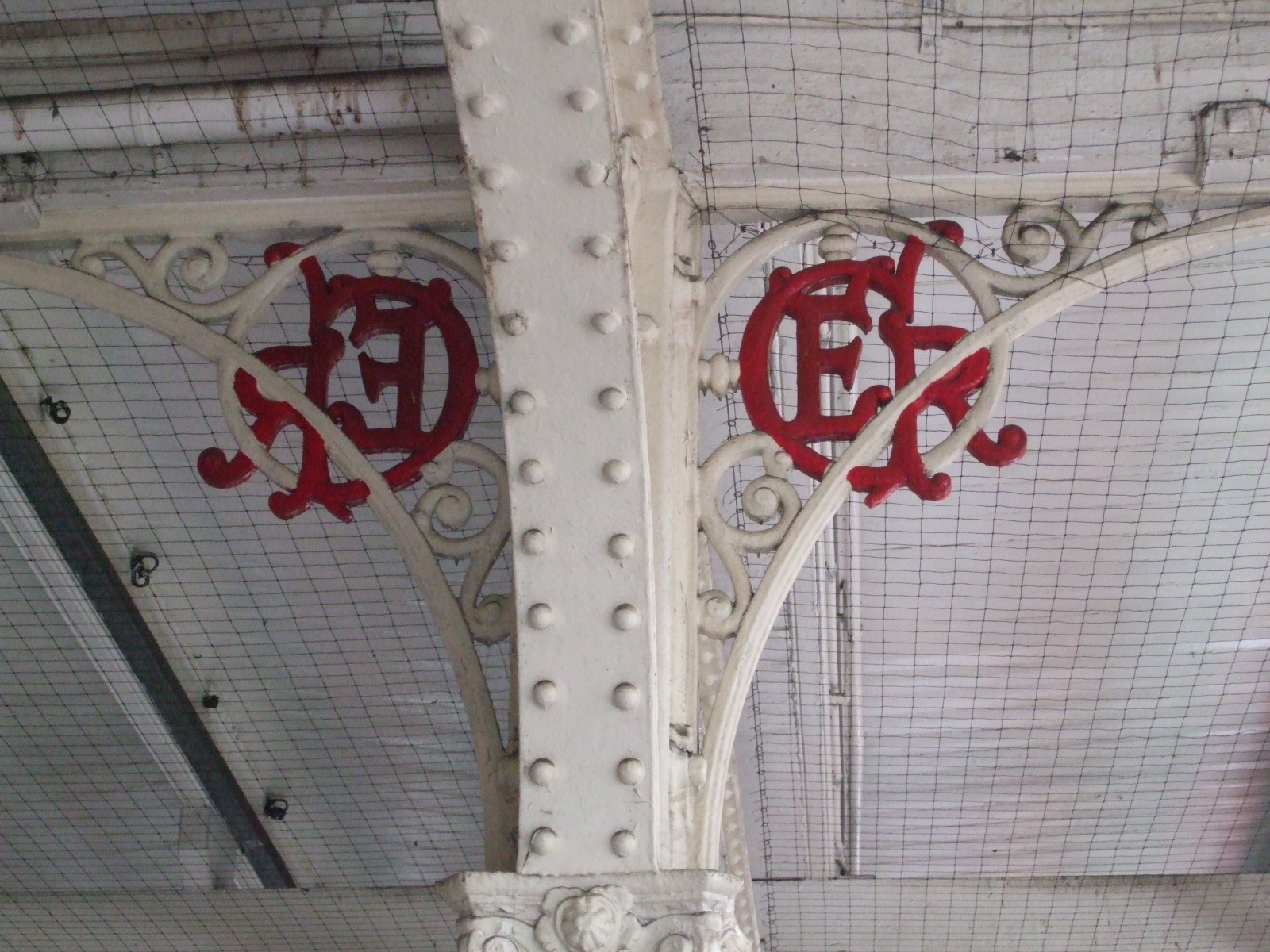
GER bracketry still visible beneath the platform awnings.

Newbury Park's most prominent feature is the bus shelter connected to the station entrance, designed by Oliver Hill in 1937, and opened on 6 July 1949. Distinguished by a copper-covered barrel-vaulted roof, the structure is a Grade II listed building and won a Festival of Britain architectural award in 1951. The award was marked by a plaque by the side of the shelter. The LNER station building, which looked very similar to Chigwell (further north on the Loop), was demolished in 1956 to facilitate widening of the adjacent A12 Eastern Avenue. (Note: Another similar building existed at Grange Hill, but this was destroyed by a German V-1 flying bomb in 1944.) The station features GER insignia just beneath the platform canopies, and has a London Transport canteen adjoining the entrance.

== Step-free access ==
In 2009, because of financial constraints, TfL decided to stop work on a project to provide step-free access at Newbury Park and five other stations, on the grounds that these are relatively quiet stations and some are already one or two stops away from an existing step-free station. (Note: Hainault station, which has had step-free access since 2010, is three stops to the north.) £4.6 million was spent on Newbury Park before the project was halted. In 2017, as part of the Mayor of London's plan to increase the number of step-free stations, work recommenced on the project to install a lift to both platforms, with the project scheduled for completion in spring 2019. (Note: Sadiq Khan, the Mayor of London, initially promised residents that the lifts would be completed in 2017. However, the target was deemed "too optimistic" by local residents campaigning for step-free access at the station.) The lifts' installation works were completed ahead of schedule and became operational in November 2018.

== Services and connections ==
=== Services ===
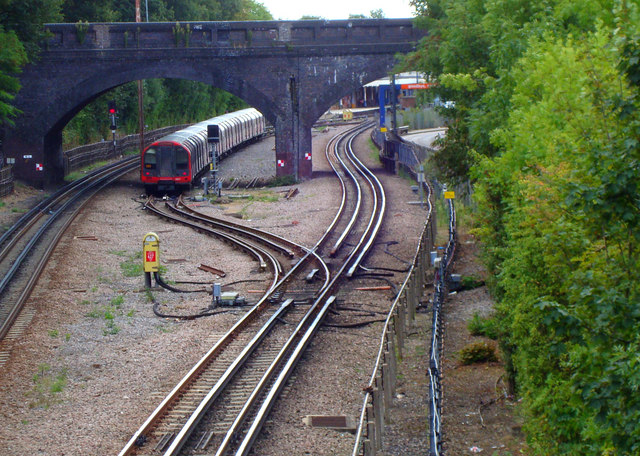
Looking south from the bridge above King George Avenue, with a Central line train parked at the siding.

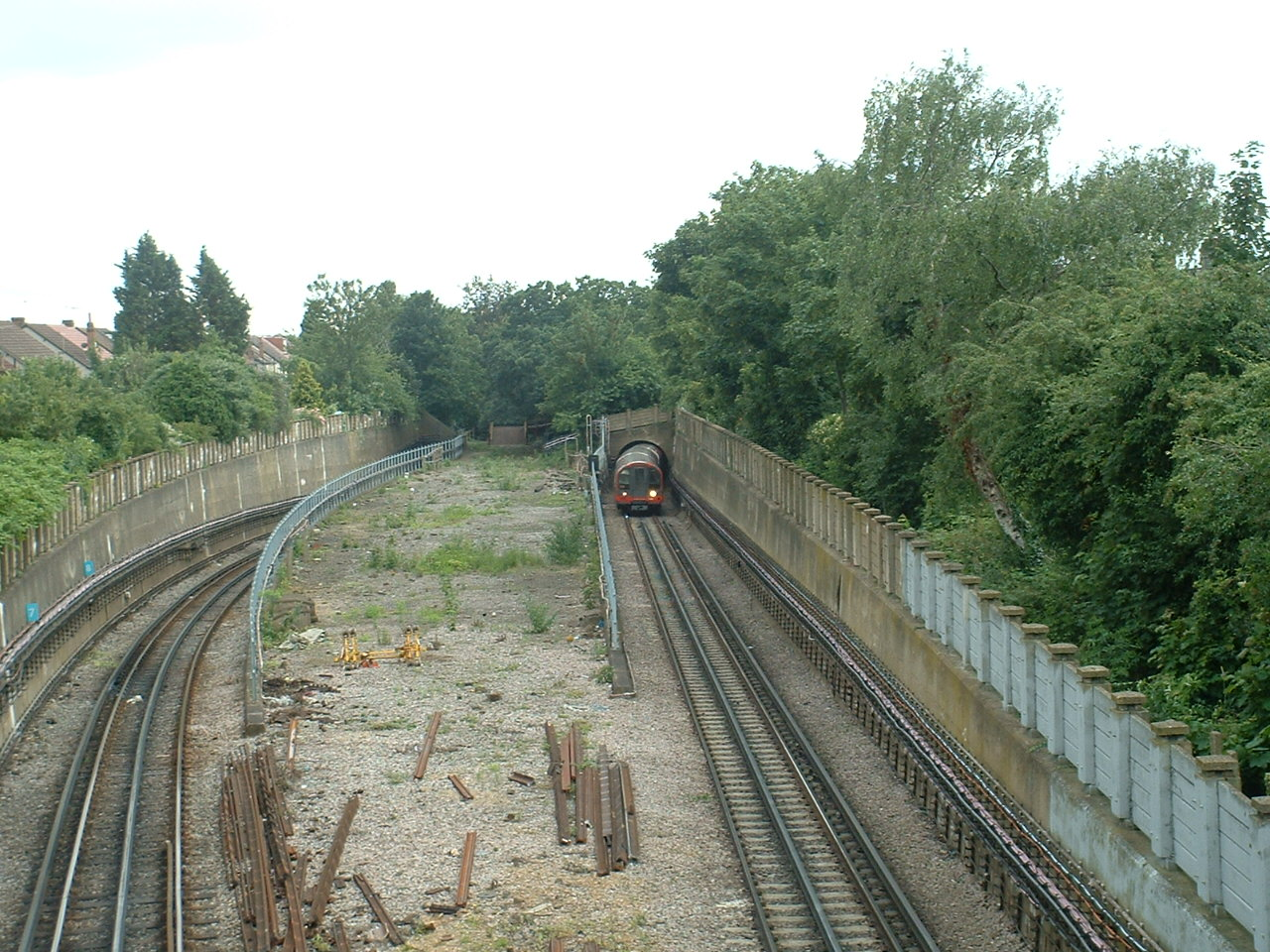
Looking south from Eastern Avenue towards the former alignment leading to Ilford, with the current alignment diverging either side and burrowing underground which heads westwards to Gants Hill and the city.

Newbury Park station is on the Hainault loop of the Central line in London fare zone 4. It is between Gants Hill and Barkingside. Train frequencies vary throughout the day but generally run every 5 minutes westbound between 05:20 and 23:54 and eastbound between 06:28 and 01:05.

Trains generally run between Hainault and Ealing Broadway, although during service disruptions, trains can also run to West Ruislip. The typical off-peak service, in trains per hour as of 2018 is:

- 9 tph westbound to Ealing Broadway
- 3 tph westbound to White City
- 9 tph eastbound to Hainault.

Trains also terminate here from White City 3 times an hour and use the crossover and siding to re-enter service westbound to White City. The siding is to the north of Newbury Park, accessible from both tracks near the station. Another crossover connects to the northbound track at the other end of the siding.

Night Tube operates through this station on Friday and Saturday nights since August 2016. The typical Night tube service, in trains per hour as of 2018 is:

- 3 tph eastbound to Hainault
- 3 tph westbound to White City

Preceding station	London Underground	Following station
Gants Hill towards Ealing Broadway or West Ruislip	Central line via Hainault loop	Barkingside towards Hainault or Woodford
Disused railways
Ilford; Line closed, station open	Great Eastern Railway; Woodford and Ilford line	Barkingside; Line and station open

=== Connections ===
London Buses routes 66, 296, 396 and London Superloop route SL12 serve the station directly. Route 296 operates 24 hours on Friday and Saturday nights.

== Notes and references ==
=== Books ===
- Brennand, Dave (2006). Ilford to Shenfield. Middleton Press. ISBN 1-901706-97-4.
- Connor, J E (2007). Branch Line to Ongar. Middleton Press. ISBN 978-1-906008-05-5.
- Croome, D.; Jackson, A. (1993). Rails Through The Clay – A History of London's Tube Railways (2nd ed.). Capital Transport. ISBN 1-85414-151-1.
- Day, John R.; Reed, John (2010) [1963]. The Story of London's Underground (11th ed.). Capital Transport. ISBN 978-1-85414-341-9.
- Lee, Charles E (1970). Seventy Years of the Central. London Transport Executive. ISBN 978-0-85329-013-1.
