= Roding Valley tube station =

London Underground station

Roding Valley
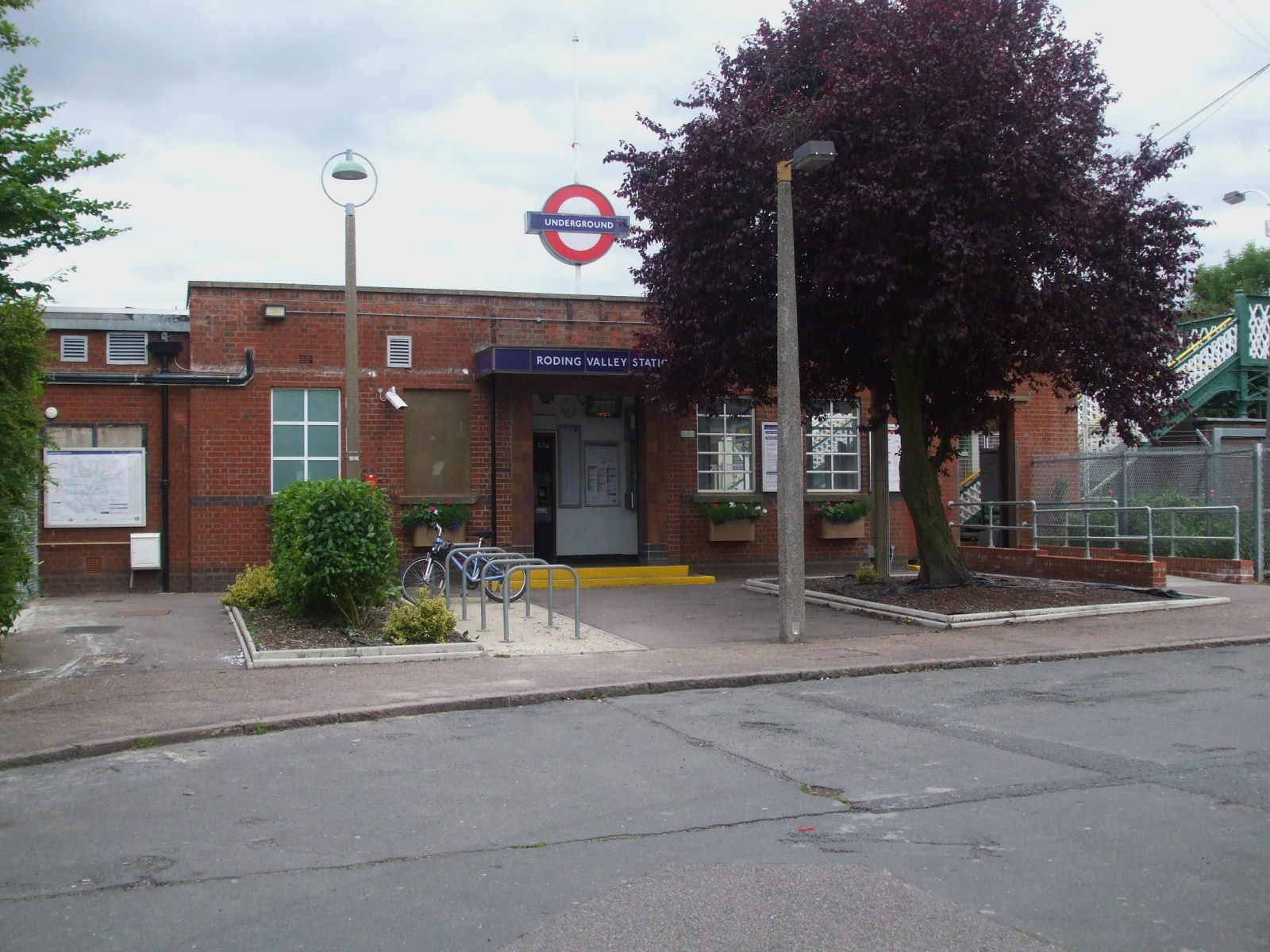
- Station entrance, northern side
- Interactive map of Roding Valley

General information
- Location: Buckhurst Hill
- Local authority: Epping Forest
- Managed by: London Underground
- Number of platforms: 2
- Accessible: Yes
- Fare zone: 4

London Underground annual entry and exit
- 2021: ▼0.16 million
- 2022: ▲0.26 million
- 2023: ▲0.27 million
- 2024: ▼0.17 million
- 2025: ▲0.20 million

Railway companies
- Original company: London and North Eastern Railway
- Post-grouping: London and North Eastern Railway

Key dates
- 1 May 1903: Track laid (GER)
- 3 February 1936: Opened (LNER)
- 29 November 1947: Closed (LNER)
- 21 November 1948: Opened (Central line)

Other information
- External links: TfL station info page
- Coordinates: 51.61694°N 0.04388°E

Roding Valley is a London Underground station. It is situated in Buckhurst Hill in the Epping Forest district of Essex. The station is on the Hainault loop of the Central line between Chigwell and Woodford stations. However, geographically it is midway between Woodford and Buckhurst Hill stations. The station is located between Station Way and Cherry Tree Rise (off Buckhurst Way). It has been in London fare zone 4 since 2 January 2007. With around 0.17 million passenger journeys recorded in 2024, Roding Valley is the 267th busiest Underground station and hence the station with the lowest annual patronage.

== History ==
The tracks through Roding Valley were opened on 1 May 1903 by the Great Eastern Railway (GER) on its Woodford to Ilford line (the Fairlop Loop). The station was not opened until 3 February 1936 by the London and North Eastern Railway (LNER, successor to the GER).

As part of the 1935–1940 New Works Programme of the London Passenger Transport Board the majority of the Woodford to Ilford loop was to be transferred to form the eastern extensions of the Central line. Although work started in 1938 it was suspended at the outbreak of the Second World War in 1939 and work was only resumed in 1946. In connection with the alterations required for the electrification of the line, the station was closed from 29 November 1947. It reopened, with its present name, and was first served by the Central line from 21 November 1948. The rather basic station buildings (all-wooden on the Woodford-bound side) were replaced by more substantial structures by 1949.

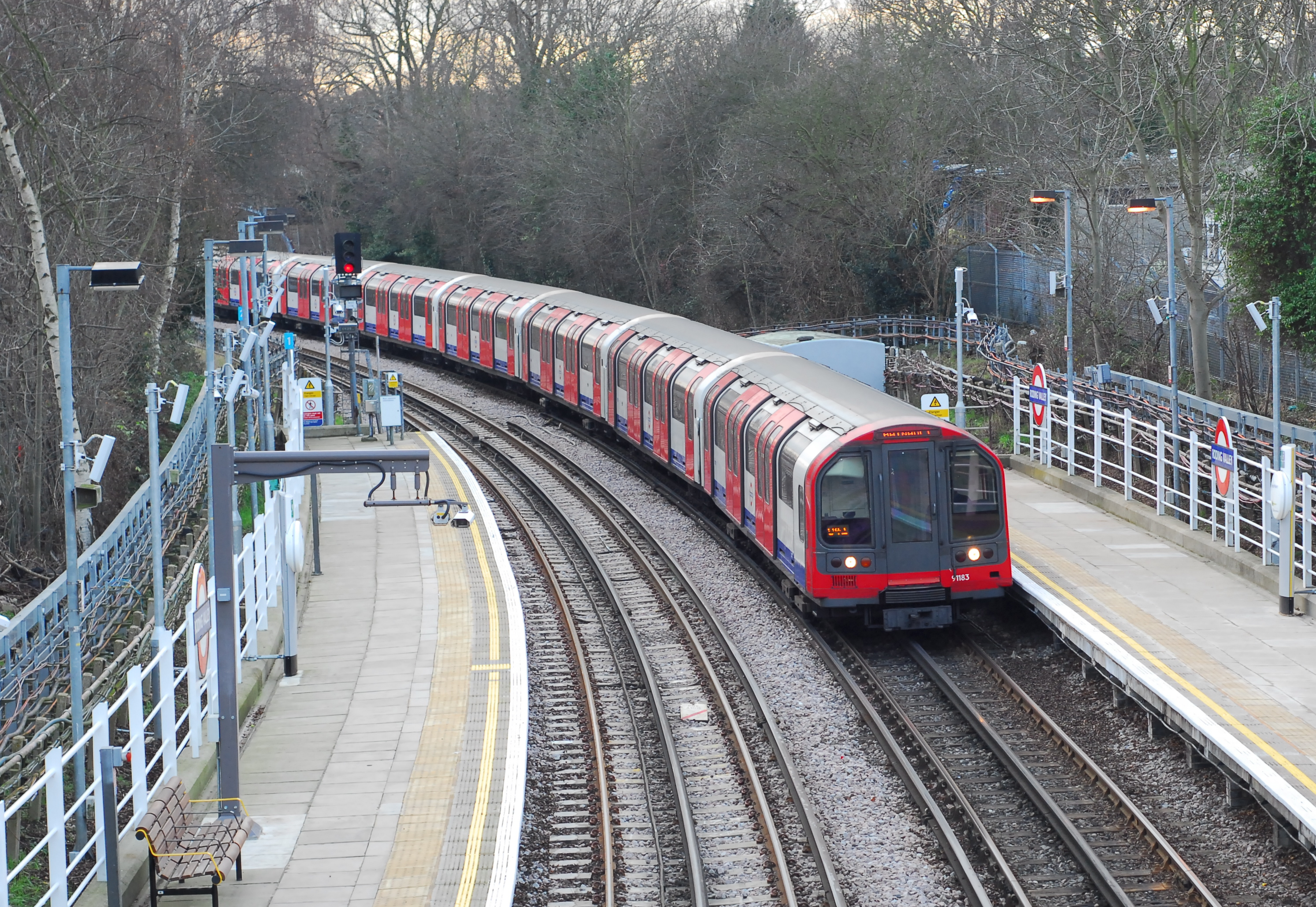
Train arrives on a Hainault-bound service

From the mid-1960s until the early 1990s the Woodford-Hainault section was largely operated separately from the rest of the Central line, using four-car (later three-car) trains of 1960 Stock. The three car units had a 1938 tube stock middle carriage. These trains were adapted for Automatic Train Operation (ATO): the Woodford-Hainault section became the testing ground for ATO on the Victoria line. Some Victoria line (1967 Stock) trains were also used to operate this section and named FACT, "Fully Automatic Controlled Train". The separate operation has now been abolished, the 1960 Stock has been withdrawn and through trains to Central London now operate via Hainault. Because of this, it is normally quicker to travel to Woodford and change there, as trains to central London run frequently from that point. At the buildup to the peak periods, some trains starting from Hainault depot operate to central London via Grange Hill, Chigwell, Roding Valley and Woodford. This is done for operating convenience but passenger demand for these services is particularly high.

== Design ==
Roding Valley is the most lightly used station on the Underground. It is one of the three tube stations not to have ticket barriers. As of 2025 it is also the only tube station on the London Underground network to have a single ticket machine, as opposed to the minimum of two elsewhere. The station underwent refurbishment in 2006 by Metronet.

== Location ==
It was originally named Roding Valley Halt (though while the full name appeared on tickets and timetables, the suffix Halt appeared on only some of the station signage), and was opened to serve new housing developments between Buckhurst Hill and Woodford. It was named after the River Roding which is close by, to the east. The track rises towards Chigwell and crosses the Roding over an impressive viaduct. Woodford Junction, where the Hainault branch leaves the main Central line to Epping, is very close to the station – Roding Valley's platforms are visible from the train in either direction between Woodford and Buckhurst Hill (on the left of the train towards Woodford).

Roding Valley station has a very small catchment area, which explains its low usage. To the east is an undeveloped flood plain of the river Roding. A short distance to the north is Buckhurst Hill station. To the north-west is open space, while the areas to the south are served by Woodford station, which has a better train service. The station straddles the border between Redbridge and Epping Forest. The southern exit is in Redbridge, while the northern exit is in Epping Forest. London Buses route W14 serves the station.

== Services ==
Roding Valley station is on the Hainault loop of the Central line between Chigwell to the east and Woodford to the west. The train service (which used to end at 8pm each day) has been extended to midnight to take into account the rising passenger numbers. The typical off-peak service in trains per hour (tph) is:

- 3 tph to Hainault
- 3 tph to Woodford

At morning rush hour, there are three trains that run to West Ruislip.

| Preceding station | London Underground | Following station |
|---|---|---|
| Chigwell towards Ealing Broadway or West Ruislip | Central line via Hainault Loop | Woodford Terminus |
