= Chigwell tube station =

London Underground station

Chigwell
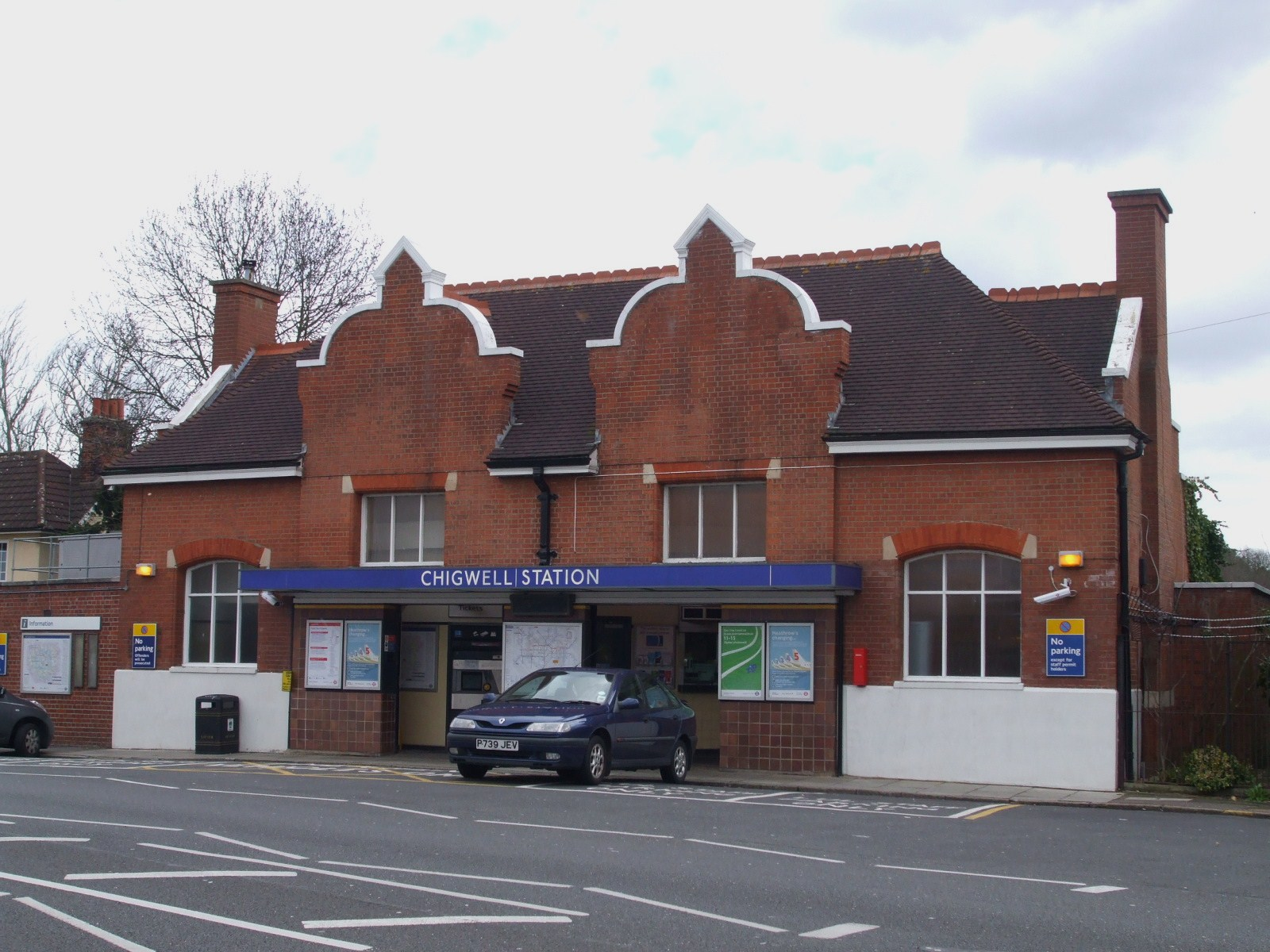
- Entrance to Station Road
- Interactive map of Chigwell

General information
- Location: Chigwell
- Local authority: Epping Forest
- Managed by: London Underground
- Number of platforms: 2
- Fare zone: 4

London Underground annual entry and exit
- 2021: ▼0.19 million
- 2022: ▲0.31 million
- 2023: ▲0.33 million
- 2024: ▼0.29 million
- 2025: ▲0.31 million

Railway companies
- Pre-grouping: Great Eastern Railway
- Post-grouping: London & North Eastern Railway

Key dates
- 1 May 1903: Opened (GER)
- 29 November 1947: Closed (LNER)
- 21 November 1948: Reopened (Central line)

Other information
- External links: TfL station info page
- Coordinates: 51.61749°N 0.07421°E

Chigwell is a London Underground station in the town of Chigwell in the Epping Forest district of Essex. It is on the Hainault Loop of the Central line, between Grange Hill and Roding Valley stations. It is located in London fare zone 4.

== History ==
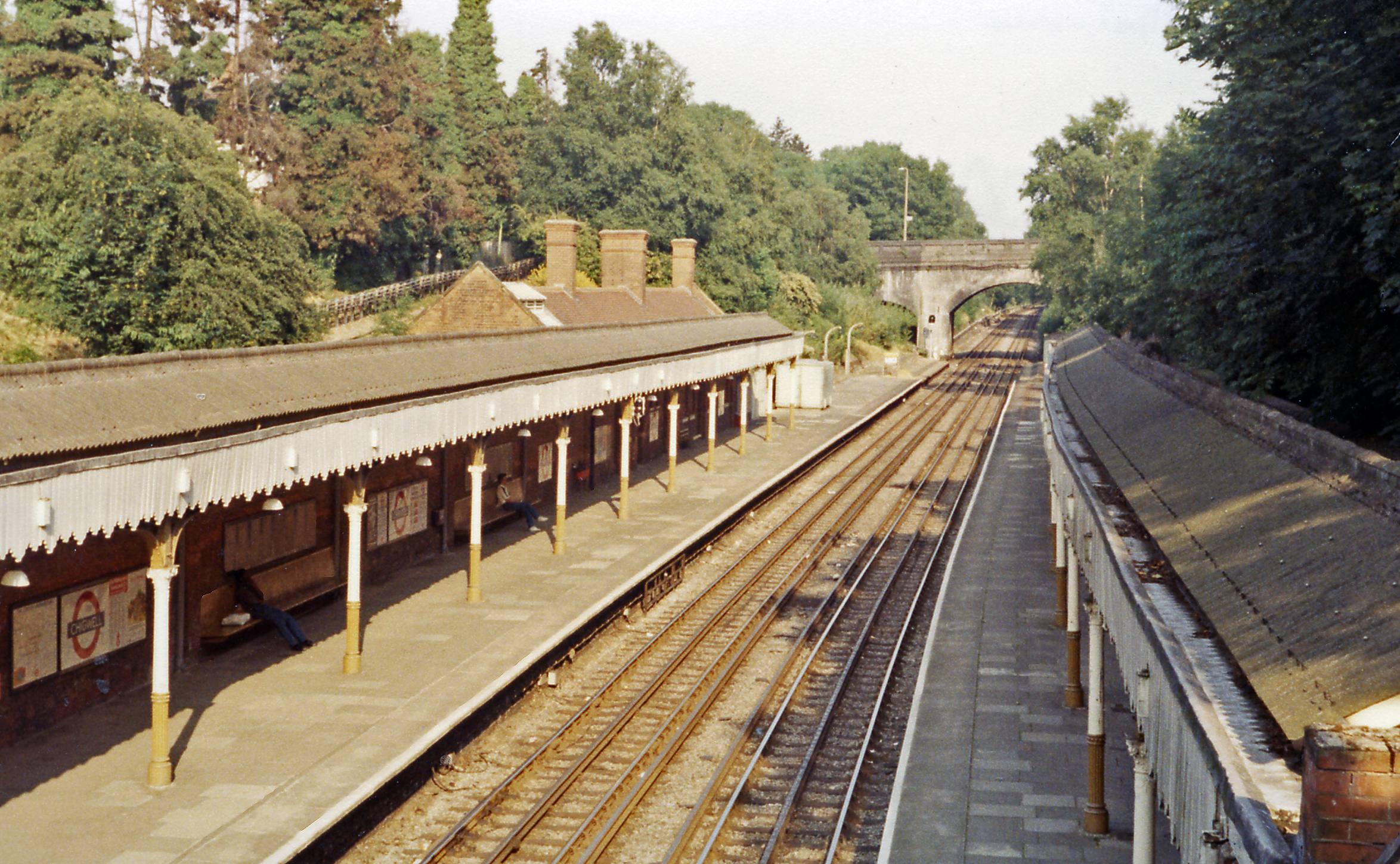
The station in 1984

The station was opened on 1 May 1903 by the Great Eastern Railway (GER) on its Woodford to Ilford line (the Fairlop Loop). As a consequence of the Railways Act 1921, the GER was merged with other railway companies in 1923 to become part of the London & North Eastern Railway (LNER).

The Woodford to Ilford loop was largely integrated into the London Underground Central line as part of the London Passenger Transport Board's New Works Programme of 1935 - 1940, which saw an extension of electric tube services into north-east London. As part of this work the station closed on 29 November 1947. Electric Underground trains served the station from 21 November 1948.

From the mid-1960s until the early 1990s the Woodford-Hainault section was largely operated separately from the rest of the Central line, using four-car (later three-car) trains of 1960 Stock. The three car units had a 1938 tube stock middle carriage. These trains were adapted for Automatic Train Operation (ATO): the Woodford-Hainault section became the testing ground for ATO on the Victoria line. Some Victoria line (1967 Stock) trains were also used to operate this section and named FACT, "Fully Automatic Controlled Train". The separate operation has now been abolished, the 1960 Stock has been withdrawn and through trains to Central London now operate via Hainault. Because of this, it is normally quicker to travel to Woodford and change there, as trains to central London run frequently from that point. At the buildup to the peak periods, some trains starting from Hainault depot operate to central London via Grange Hill, Chigwell, Roding Valley and Woodford. This is done for operating convenience but passenger demand for these services is particularly high.

== The station today ==
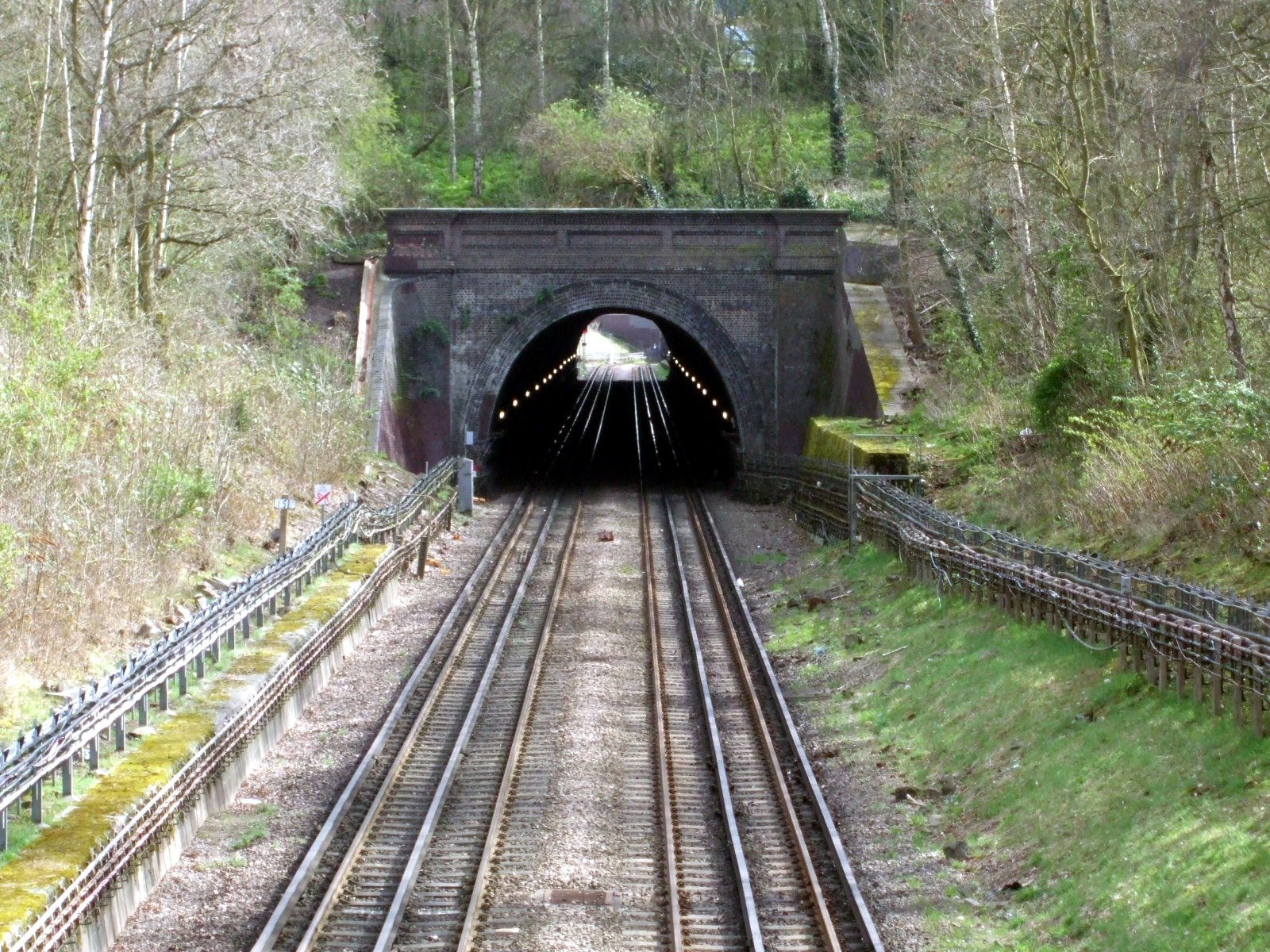
The tunnel between Chigwell and Grange Hill

The station went through refurbishment, which was completed in 2006.

== Services ==
Chigwell station is on the Hainault loop of the Central line between Grange Hill and Roding Valley. In view of the rising passenger numbers, the train service on this branch was extended to midnight in 2006. (Previously it stopped at 20:00.) The typical off-peak service in trains per hour (tph) is:

- 3 tph to Hainault
- 3 tph to Woodford

At morning rush hour, there are three trains that run to West Ruislip.

Preceding station	London Underground	Following station
Grange Hill towards Hainault	Central line Hainault-Woodford	Roding Valley towards Woodford
Historical railways
Grange Hill; Line and station open	Great Eastern Railway; Woodford and Ilford line	Woodford; Line and station open

== Connections ==
London Bus routes 167 and school routes 667 and 677 serve the station. Local Bus route 804 and Local School route 53 also serve the station.

== Filming location ==
The station is used as a location in Mike Leigh's 1983 film Meantime.
