= Grange Hill tube station =

London Underground station

Grange Hill
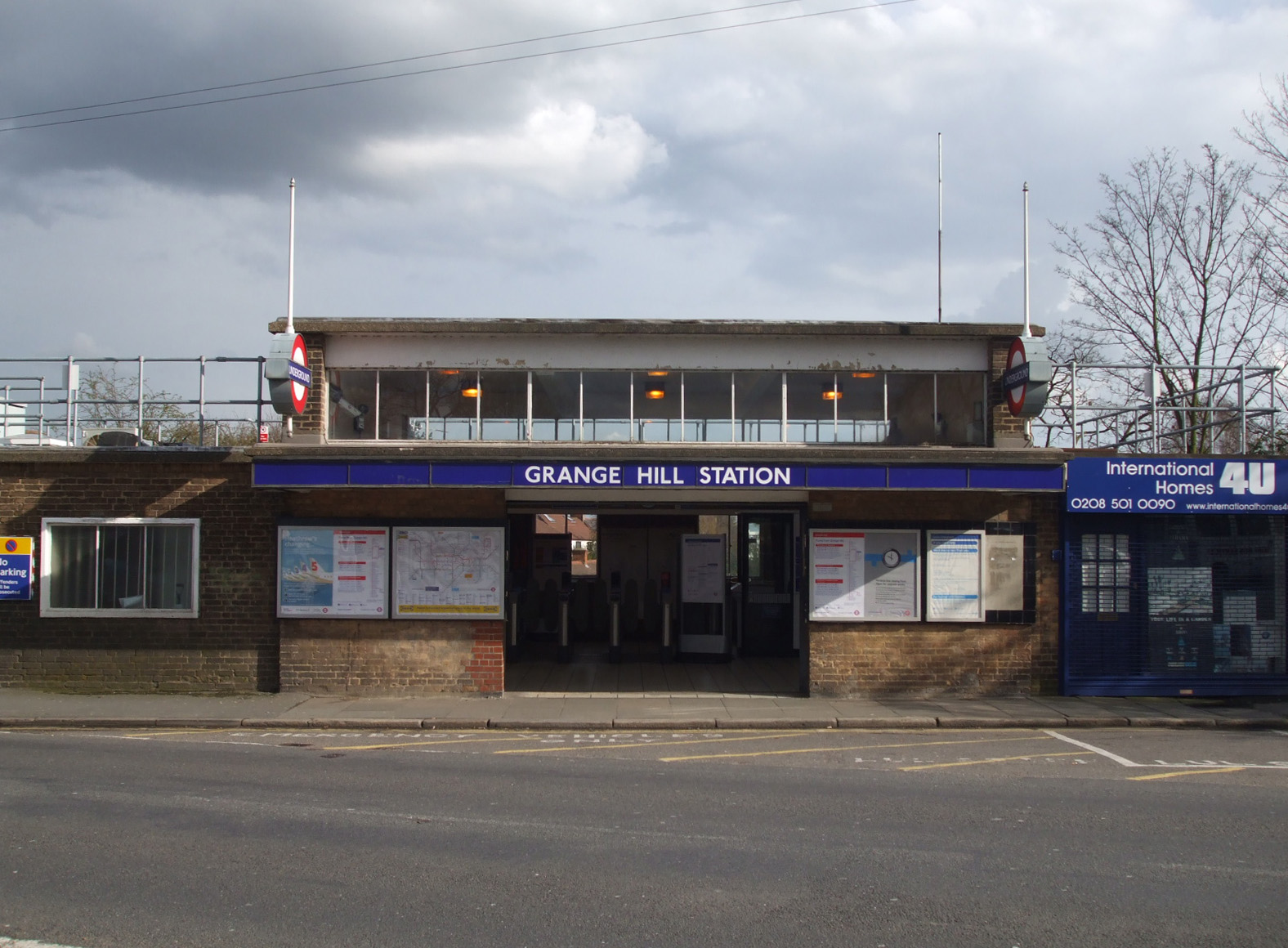
- Entrance on Manor Road
- Interactive map of Grange Hill

General information
- Location: Chigwell
- Local authority: Epping Forest
- Managed by: London Underground
- Number of platforms: 2
- Fare zone: 4

London Underground annual entry and exit
- 2021: ▼0.23 million
- 2022: ▲0.37 million
- 2023: ▲0.40 million
- 2024: ▼0.34 million
- 2025: ▲0.37 million

Key dates
- 1 May 1903: Opened (GER)
- 29 November 1947: Closed (LNER)
- 21 November 1948: Opened (Central line)
- 4 October 1965: Goods yard closed

Other information
- External links: TfL station info page
- Coordinates: 51.61333°N 0.09222°E

Grange Hill is a London Underground station. It lies in the parish of Chigwell in the Epping Forest district of Essex. The boundary with the London Borough of Redbridge is immediately to the east of the station buildings. The station is on the Hainault loop of the Central line, between Hainault and Chigwell stations. It has been in London fare zone 4 since 2 January 2007.

== History ==
The station was opened by the Great Eastern Railway on 1 May 1903 on their Fairlop Loop line between Woodford and Ilford.

As a consequence of the Railways Act 1921, the GER was merged with other railway companies in 1923 to become part of the London and North Eastern Railway (LNER). As part of the 1935–1940 New Works Programme of the London Passenger Transport Board the majority of the Woodford to Ilford loop was to be transferred to form the eastern extensions of the Central line. Although work commenced in 1938 it was suspended upon the outbreak of the Second World War in 1939 and work only recommenced in 1946. In connection with the alterations required for the electrification of the line, the station was closed from 29 November 1947. It reopened and was first served by the Central line from 21 November 1948. The station ticket office was reconstructed as part of this work following destruction of the original building by a German V1 'Doodlebug' in July 1944. The 1903 building was very similar to the next station to the north, Chigwell, which is still largely untouched to this day, and the original building further south at Newbury Park, demolished in 1956 to make way for a road improvement.

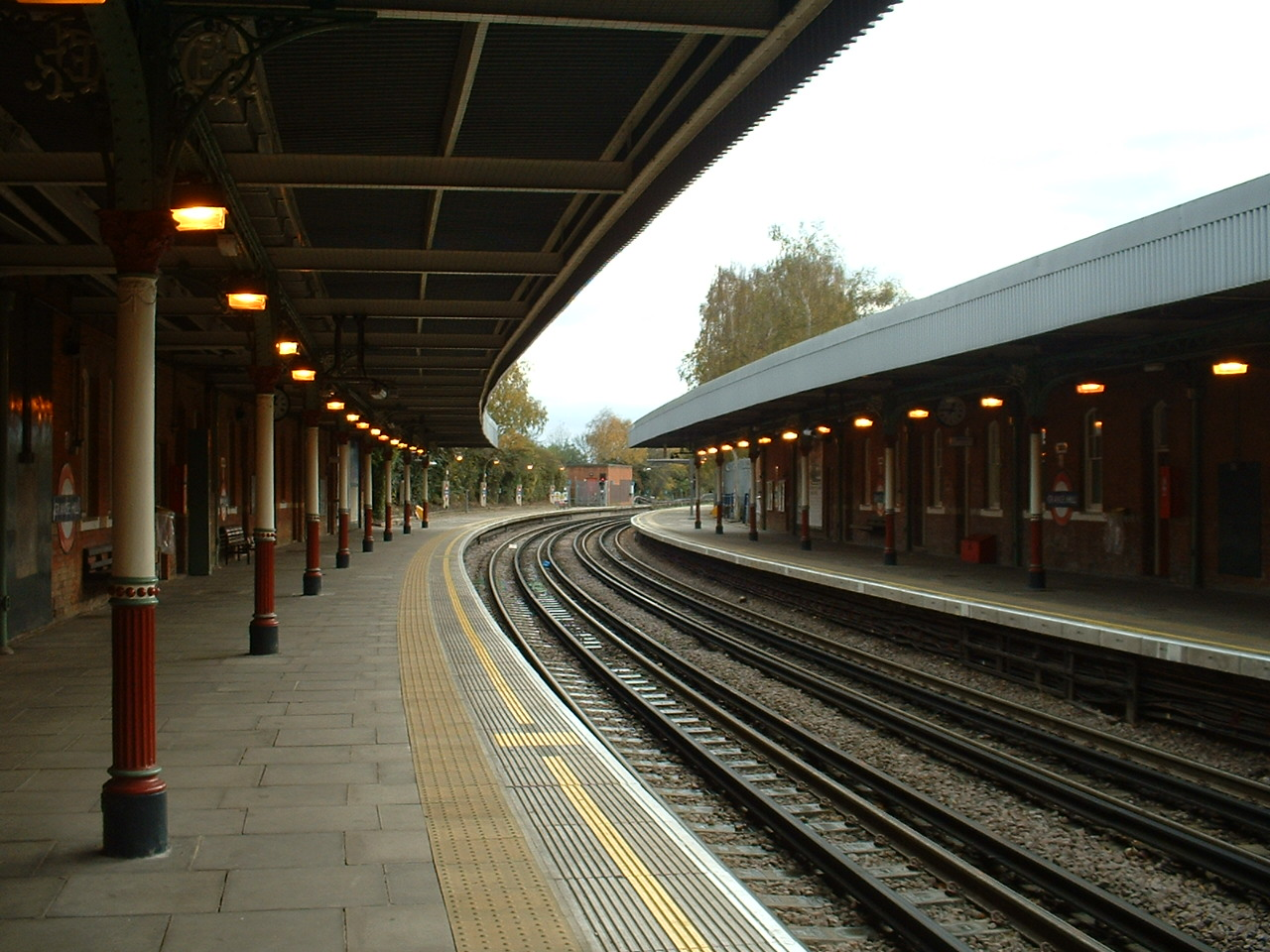
View of platforms

From the mid-1960s until the early 1990s the Woodford-Hainault section was largely separately operated from the rest of the Central line, using four car (later three car) trains of 1960 Stock. These trains were adapted for Automatic Train Operation (ATO); the Woodford-Hainault section became the testing ground for ATO on the Victoria line. The separate operation has now been abolished and through trains to Central London via Hainault now operate. At the beginning of the morning and evening peak periods, some trains starting from Hainault depot enter service at Grange Hill and work to central London via Woodford, although in the current timetable, only one train returns to Hainault depot via Grange Hill, the majority doing so instead via Newbury Park and Hainault.

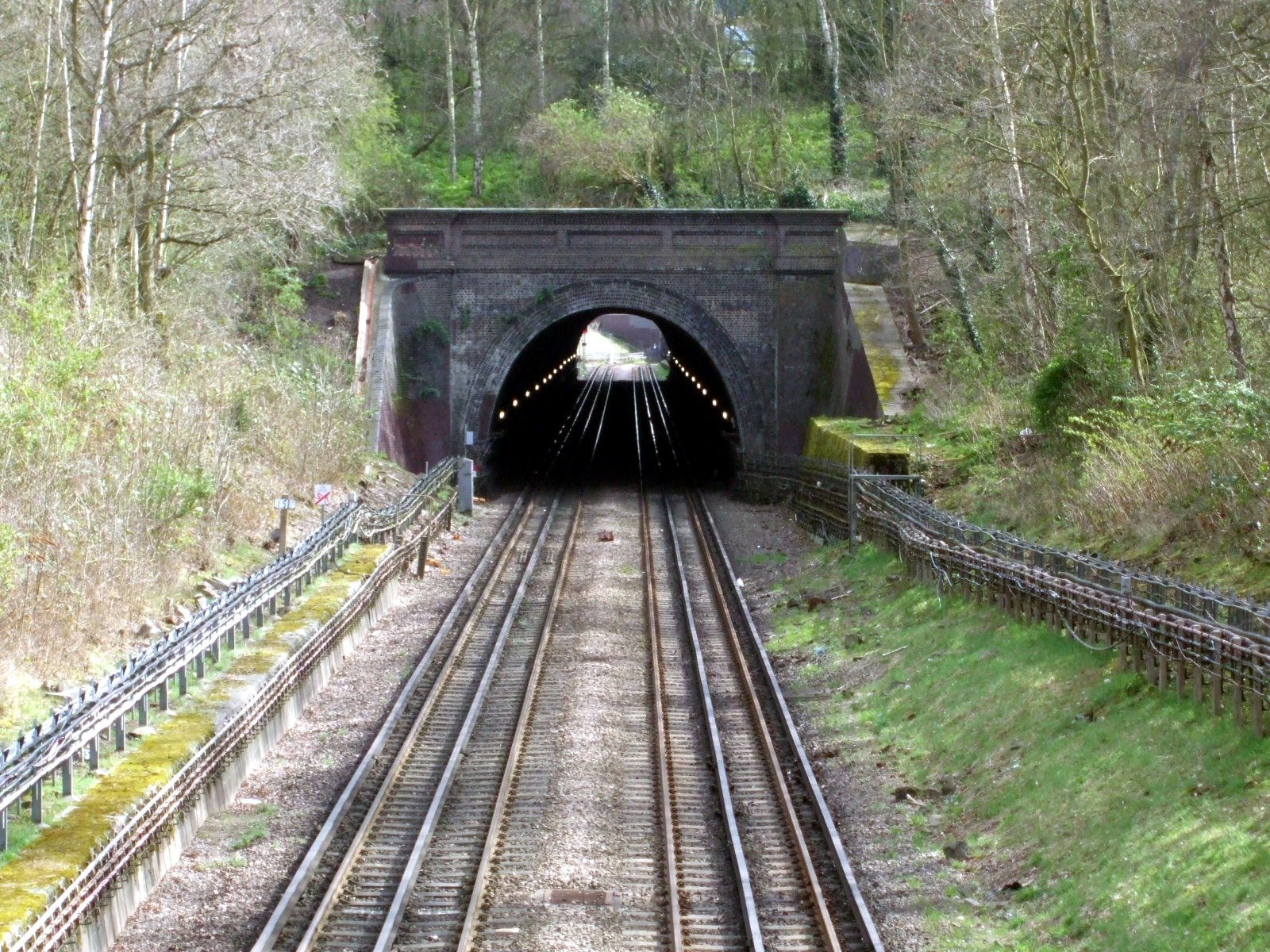
The tunnel between Grange Hill and Chigwell

Since 5 February 2006 this has been one of the small number of stations on the network to have no staffed ticket office. However, staff are available 24 hours a day for customer information and the train service has been extended to midnight to take into account the rising passenger numbers.

== Services ==
Grange Hill station is on the Hainault loop of the Central line between Hainault and Chigwell. The typical off-peak services are:

- 3 trains per hour to Hainault
- 3 trains per hour to Woodford

At morning rush hour, there are three trains that run to West Ruislip.

== Connections ==
London Buses routes 362 and 462 serve the station.

| Preceding station | London Underground | Following station |
|---|---|---|
| Hainault towards Ealing Broadway or West Ruislip | Central line via Hainault loop | Chigwell towards Woodford |
Historical railways
| Hainault; Line and station open | Great Eastern Railway; Woodford and Ilford line | Chigwell; Line and station open |
