= Hainault Loop =

Railway line in London, England

The Hainault Loop, originally opened as the Fairlop Loop, is a 6.5-mile (10.5 km) branch line of the Great Eastern Railway (GER). It once connected Woodford on the Ongar (now Epping) branch to Ilford on the Main Line, with an eastward connection for goods, excursions and stock transfers to Seven Kings. The loop opened to freight on 20 April 1903 and to passengers on 1 May 1903. In 1923, the GER was "grouped" into the London & North Eastern Railway (LNER), who provided passenger services until December 1947. After this date, the route was electrified for London Underground services from both the Woodford and Leytonstone directions (the latter via a pair of new tube tunnels) and the link to Ilford (and, eventually, Seven Kings) closed on the Central line, having been served by Tube trains since 1948 (Woodford and Newbury Park stations being served by December 1947).

== History ==
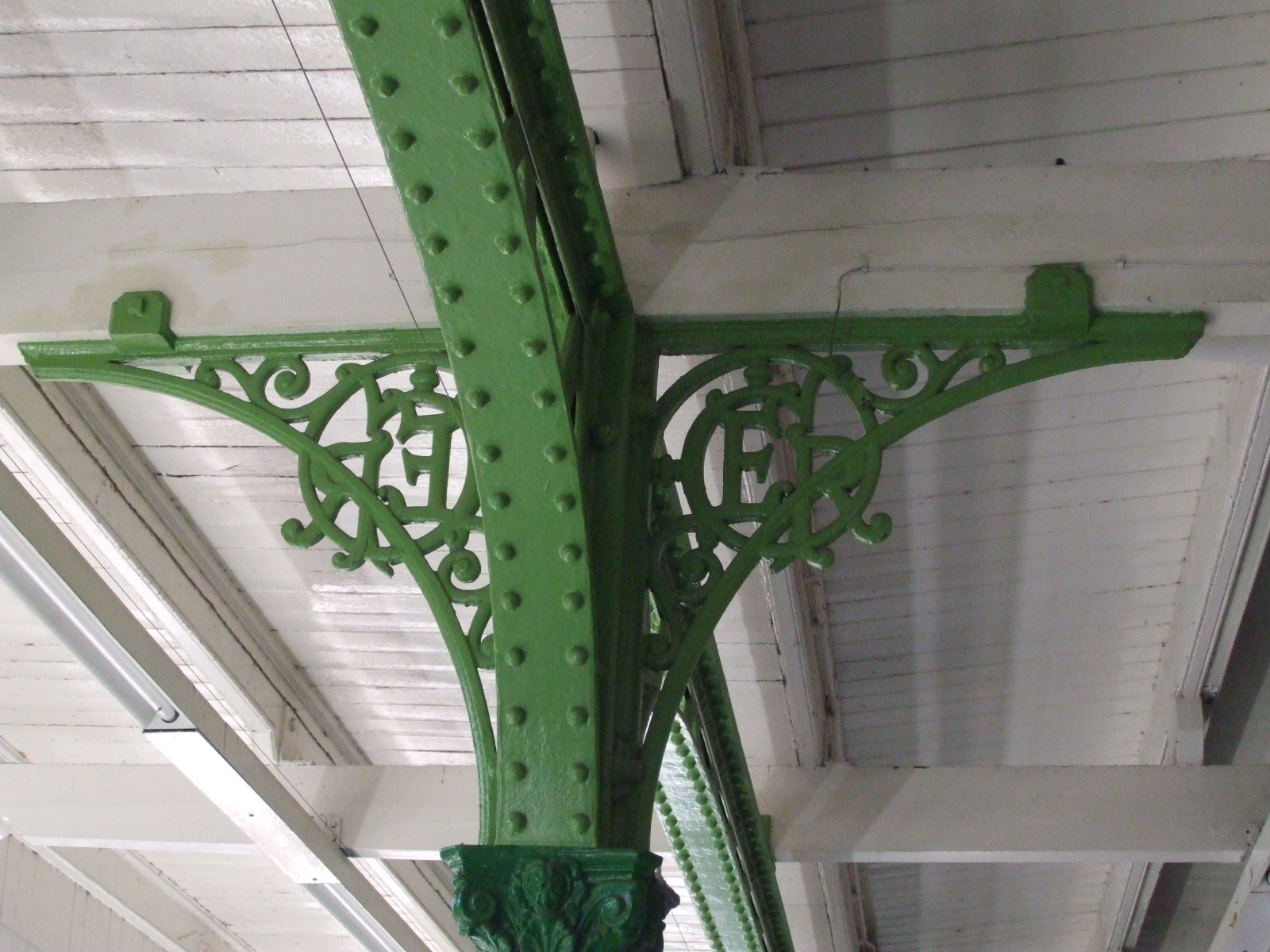
GER bracketry still visible at Fairlop station

The GER built the line to foster suburban growth in Edwardian Ilford and Chigwell; the results were mixed. Hainault station had so few passengers that it closed between 1908 and 1930. The loop passed to the London and North Eastern Railway (LNER) in 1923 after the grouping of railways into The Big Four. The LNER added a station at Roding Valley in 1936 to serve a housing development. Most of the route transferred to the Central line of the London Transport Executive (LTE) during 1947 and 1948 as part of the war-delayed New Works Programme. The transfer brought fourth-rail electrification to replace steam and construction of a deep-level line connecting Leytonstone on the Ongar branch with Newbury Park on the loop, together with severing connections between Newbury Park and Ilford and Seven Kings.

First to go was the westward curve between Newbury Park Junction and Ilford Carriage Sidings Junction, on 30 November 1947. The other connection to Seven Kings West Junction was goods only and survived until 19 March 1956. The whole triangular junction disappeared under expansion of Ilford carriage sheds in 1959. Goods trains operated by British Rail continued using the loop via Woodford as far as Newbury Park until 4 October 1965. A short turn-back siding was provided on the former track-bed south of Newbury Park: after goods trains were withdrawn it was used by engineers' trains until 1992.

== Layout ==
=== Woodford to Ilford ===
The Loop was double track and all six original stations had two 600 ft (183 m) platforms: the 1936 station at Roding Valley had 500 ft (152 m) platforms. Hainault station re-opened in 1948 with a third platform It is today used by terminating Central line trains. A fork at the northern end at Woodford Junction let trains leave or join the Ongar branch. A triangular junction at the southern end gave access to the main line, the site now occupied by Ilford carriage sheds and a maintenance depot run by Bombardier. The apex of the triangle was Newbury Park Junction (just south of Vicarage Lane), the western side was Ilford Carriage Sidings Junction, and the eastern side was Seven Kings West Junction.

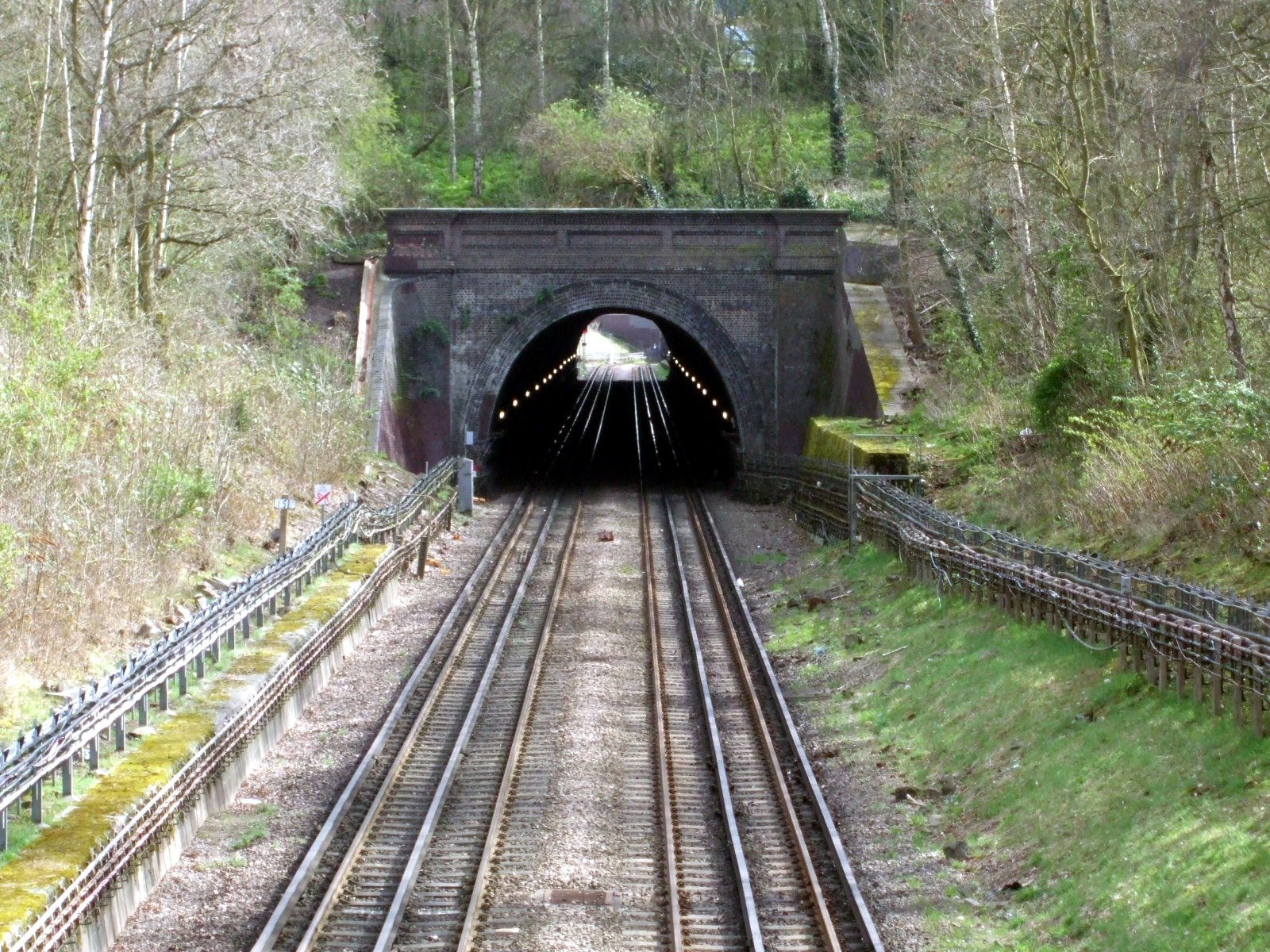
Grange Hill Tunnel looking east towards western portal.

The topography challenged engineers. The line was on the surface but 260 yards (238m) of tunnel was bored immediately north of Grange Hill. The line between Roding Valley and Chigwell was on an embankment, and a three-arch viaduct was built over the River Roding. Further east, the embankment was bisected by the London end of the M11 motorway in 1977, a concrete bridge carrying the line over the road. Chigwell and Grange Hill were built in cuttings, Hainault and Fairlop on embankment, and most of the route south of Barkingside including Newbury Park was in a cutting. Only the platforms at Roding Valley and Barkingside (eastbound only) are accessible from street level. Works for accessibility to each of the platforms at Roding Valley were completed in 2009; hitherto there were a couple of steps to street level.

Goods yards were at Grange Hill (closed 1965), Hainault (closed 1908), Fairlop (closed 1958), Barkingside and Newbury Park (both closed 1965). One of the former sidings at Newbury Park is now the eastbound through line, with the former eastbound line normally used only for reversing, though it retains the connection facing Barkingside. The sidings at Grange Hill now form part of the north-facing access from Hainault Depot. They extend parallel to the station platforms, and there are also sidings at the southern end of the depot next to the platforms at Hainault. East of Chigwell a short siding served Chigwell Nursery in GER days, but this was closed, probably before Grouping into the LNER (the nursery was sold in 1922).

=== Newbury Park to Leytonstone ===
The line between Leytonstone and Newbury Park is of standard twin-bore construction, with the three intermediate stations all having central platforms. The route diverges from the Ongar branch east of Leytonstone at Leytonstone Junction, with the tracks passing either side of the latter and immediately diving underground. The route heads mostly beneath the A12 Eastern Avenue as far as Gants Hill. East of here it turns southeast along Perth Road, then east to pass beneath Ley Street to the alignment of Wards Road, before curving northwards beneath Glebelands Avenue to reach the surface just south of Newbury Park, with the tracks passing to either side of the trackbed of the former line to Ilford: this explains the relatively long tunnel between Gants Hill and Newbury Park. The tunnels were essentially completed when the Second World War broke out in 1939, and between March 1942 and the end of hostilities they were used as an underground munitions factory, complete with its own 18 in (457 mm) railway, by Plessey, based in Ilford for many years. The factory extended almost 5 miles with about 300,000 sq. ft. of space. Redbridge is the shallowest "deep-level" station on the Underground, 26 feet (7.9 m) below street level, necessitating just a short of flight of stairs for entry. Gants Hill and Wanstead, due to their greater depth, have escalators, with additional ramps or stairs at the former.

== Stations ==
=== Stations served ===
From north-west to south-east

- Woodford, opened 22 August 1856 by the Eastern Counties Railway (ECR), closed briefly, re-opening 14 December 1947.

Fairlop Loop diverges from the Ongar (now Epping) Branch at Woodford Junction

- Roding Valley, opened 3 February 1936 as Roding Valley Halt by the LNER, closed 29 November 1947, re-opening 21 November 1948.
- Chigwell, opened 1 May 1903 by the GER, closed 29 November 1947, re-opening 21 November 1948.
- Grange Hill, opened 1 May 1903 by the GER, closed 29 November 1947, re-opening 21 November 1948.
- Hainault, opened 1 May 1903 by the GER, closed 1 October 1908 to 3 March 1930. Closed 29 November 1947, re-opening 31 May 1948.
- Fairlop, opened 1 May 1903 by the GER, closed 29 November 1947, re-opening 31 May 1948.
- Barkingside, opened 1 May 1903 by the GER, closed 22 May 1916 to 30 June 1919. Closed 29 November 1947, re-opening 31 May 1948.
- Newbury Park, opened 1 May 1903 by the GER, closed 29 November 1947, re-opening 14 December 1947 as part of the Central line.

Former connection: Fairlop Loop joins Great Eastern Main Line via westward curve between Newbury Park Junction and Ilford Carriage Sidings Junction

  - Ilford, opened 20 June 1839 by the Eastern Counties Railway. Operated by the Elizabeth line. Connection closed 30 November 1947.

Former connection (freight-only): Fairlop Loop joins Great Eastern Main Line via eastward curve between Newbury Park Junction and Seven Kings West Junction

  - Seven Kings, opened 1 March 1899 by the GER. Operated by the Elizabeth line. Connection closed 19 March 1956. (not served by scheduled Fairlop Loop passenger trains)

Remainder of Fairlop loop connects with Central line tube from Leytonstone (nowadays both parts referred to as the "Hainault Loop")

- Gants Hill, opened by LTE 14 December 1947.
- Redbridge, opened by LTE 14 December 1947.
- Wanstead, opened by LTE 14 December 1947.

re-joins the Ongar (Epping) Branch at Leytonstone Junction

- Leytonstone, opened 22 August 1856 by the ECR, closed briefly, re-opening 5 May 1947.

=== Station architecture ===
Most of the surface stations on the Fairlop loop and the underground stations on the Hainault loop are notable for their architecture, dating from Edwardian to the London Transport style of the 1930s/1940s. The bus station shelter at Newbury Park won a Festival of Britain award in 1951, and both it and Barkingside station are Grade II Listed buildings. The interior of Gants Hill was heavily inspired by the Moscow Metro. Gants Hill lacks a proper station building, being directly underneath the busy A12 roundabout. Due to bomb damage to Grange Hill in 1944, and expansion of the A12 Eastern Avenue at Newbury Park in 1956, the original station buildings were demolished. They were almost identical to that at Chigwell. Newbury Park was meant to receive a replacement building but it was never built, and the only entrance is via the bus station. Hainault's original structure, prior to rebuilding due to the addition of Hainault Depot, was very similar to that at Fairlop. Roding Valley had rather basic buildings on opening, with a wooden shelter on the Woodford-bound side, replaced by more substantial structures when transferred to the Central line. Notable architects included Oliver Hill for Newbury Park bus station and W. N. Ashbee for the original six stations from Chigwell to Newbury Park (though the Listing authorities credit William Burgess for Barkingside, possibly erroneously). Renowned London Underground architect Charles Holden designed the three new underground stations that opened in 1947.

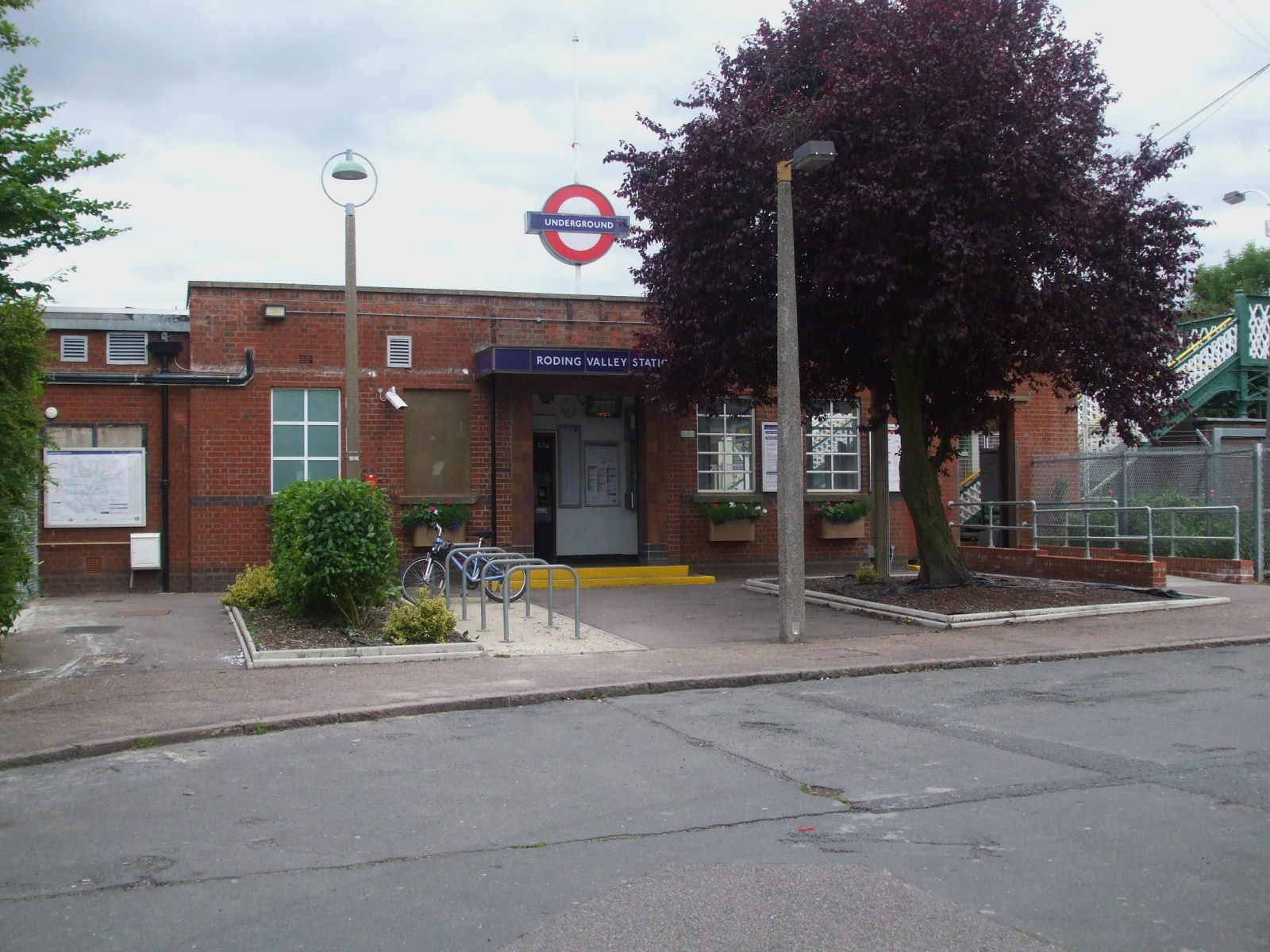
Roding Valley (new building 1949)

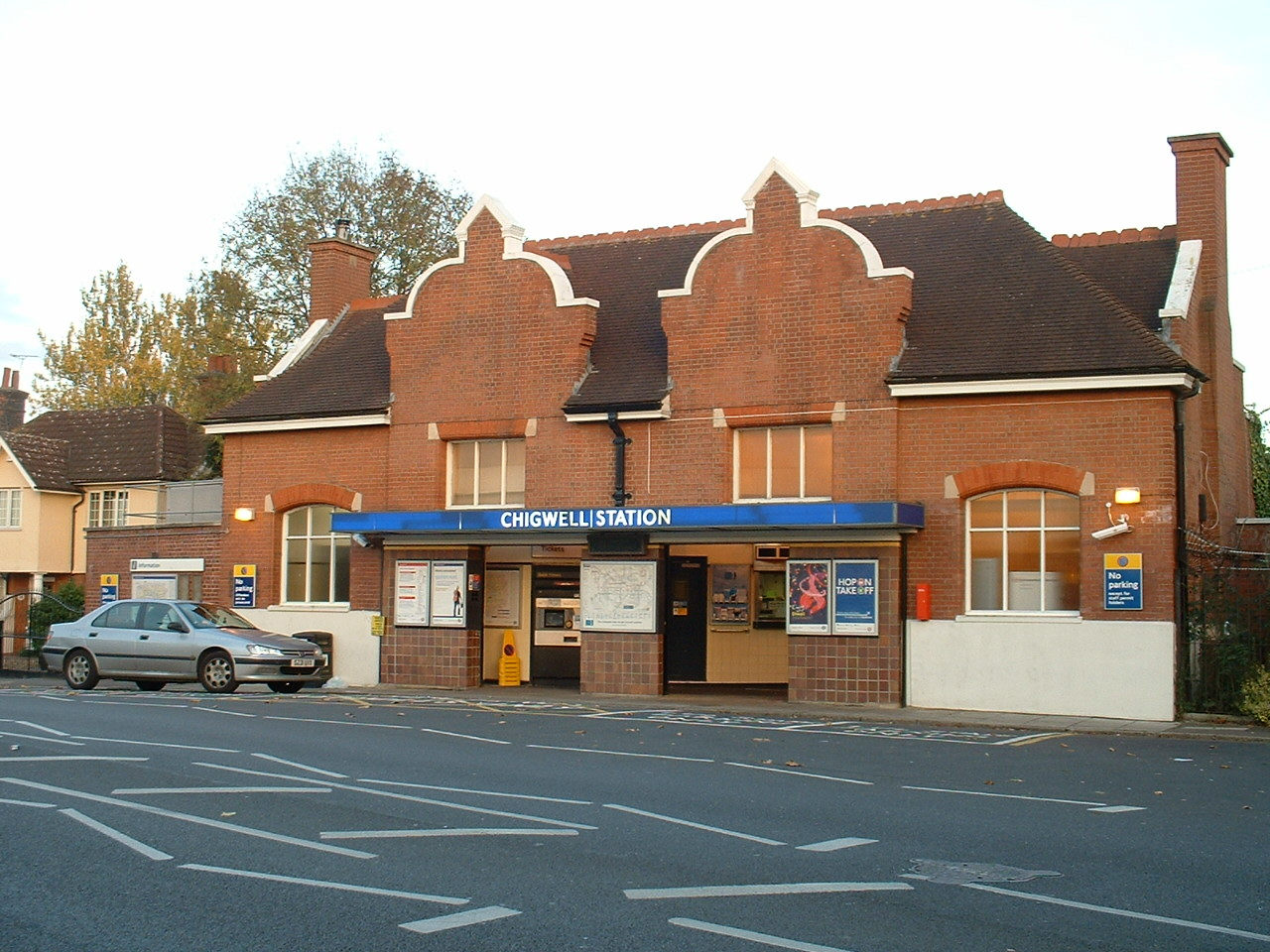
Chigwell

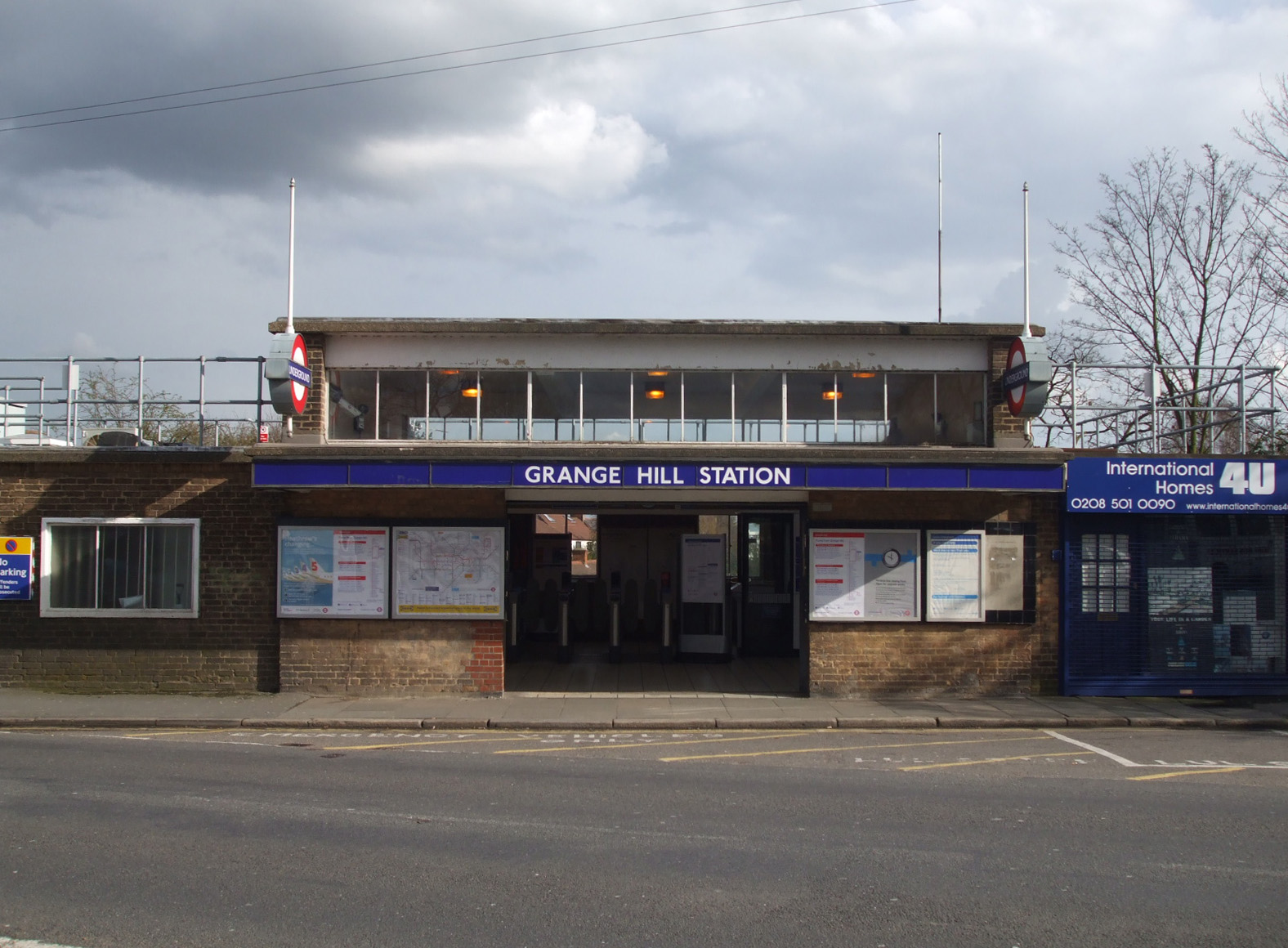
Grange Hill (new building 1949)

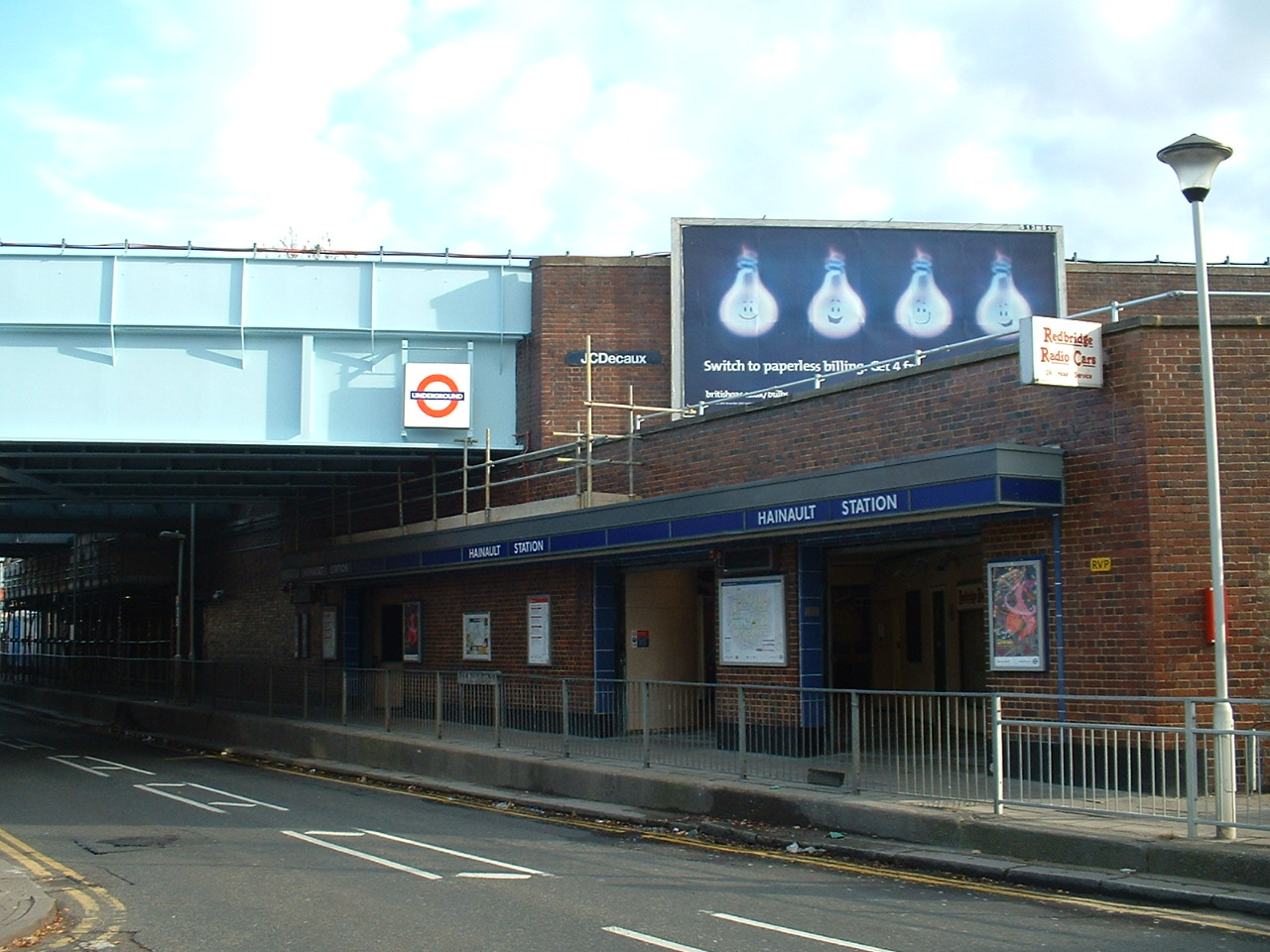
Hainault (new building 1949)

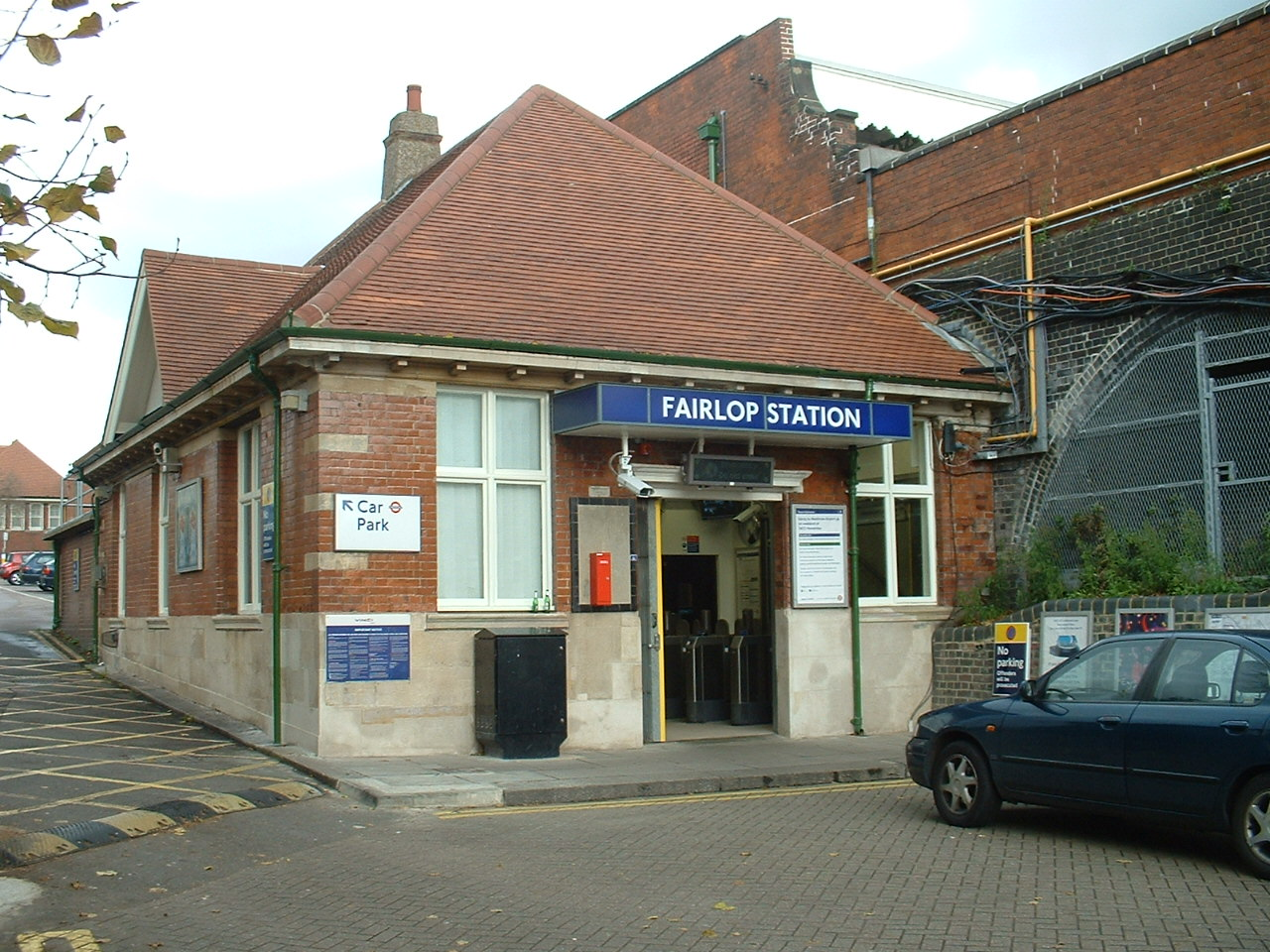
Fairlop

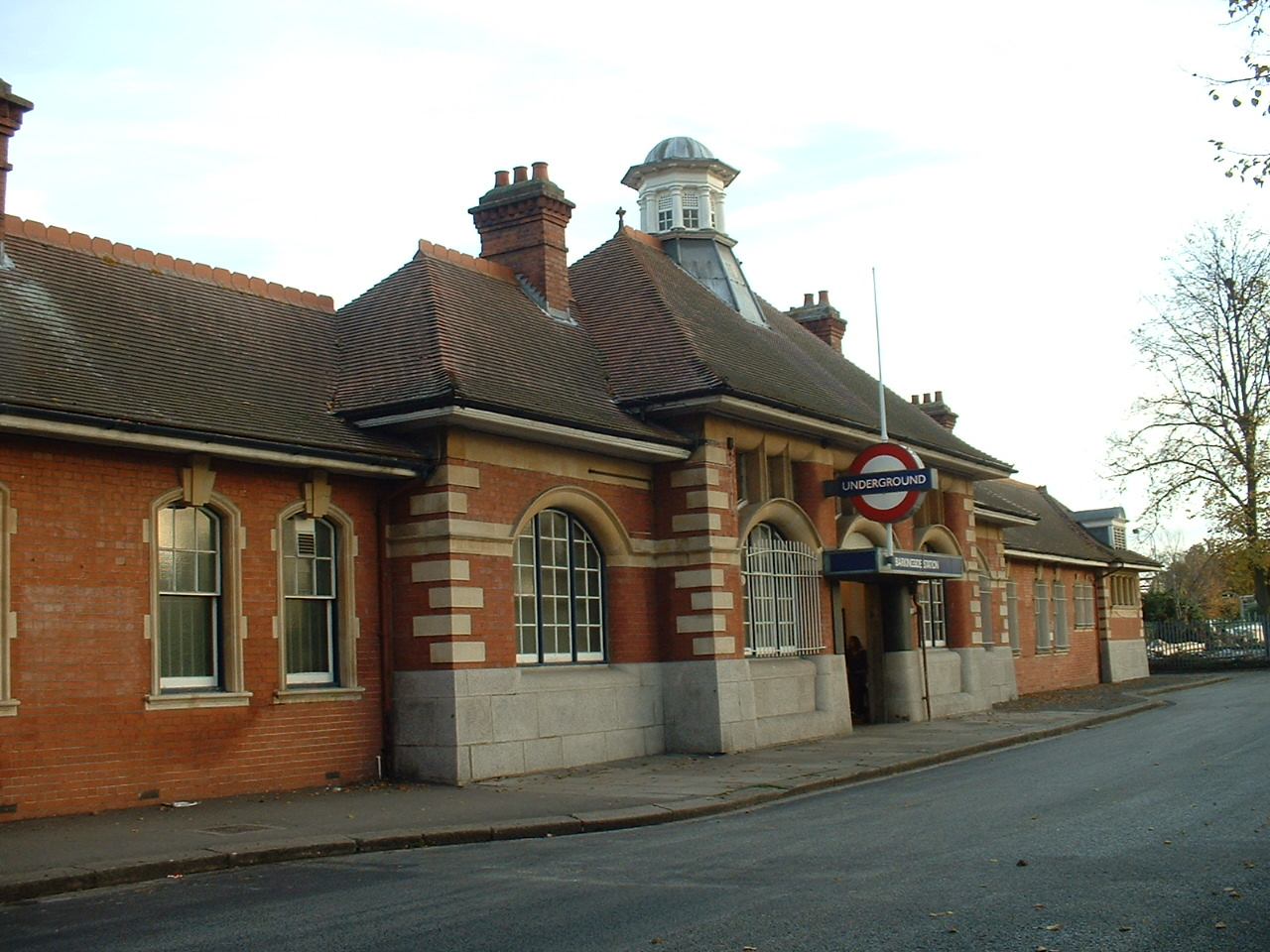
Barkingside

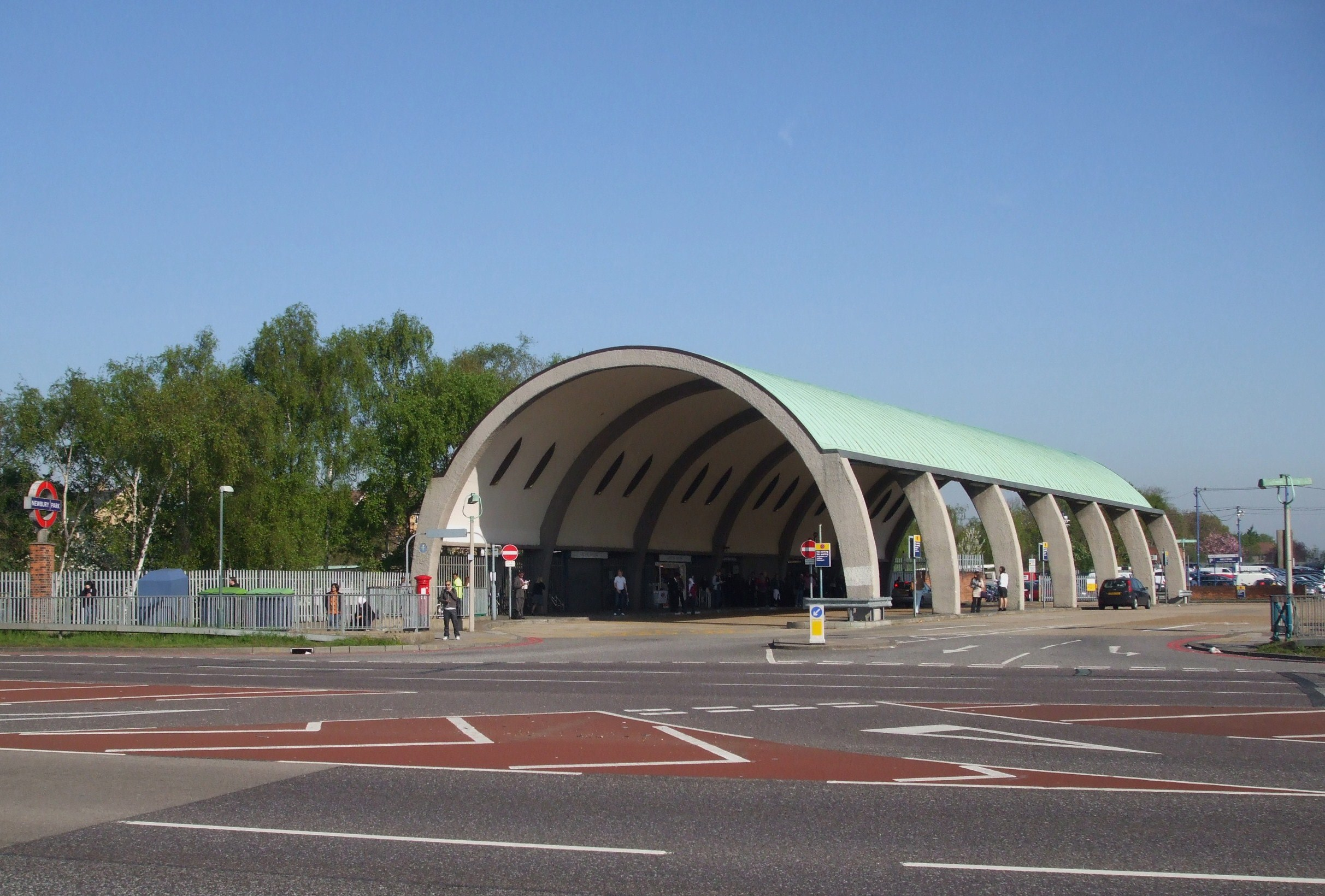
Newbury Park bus station

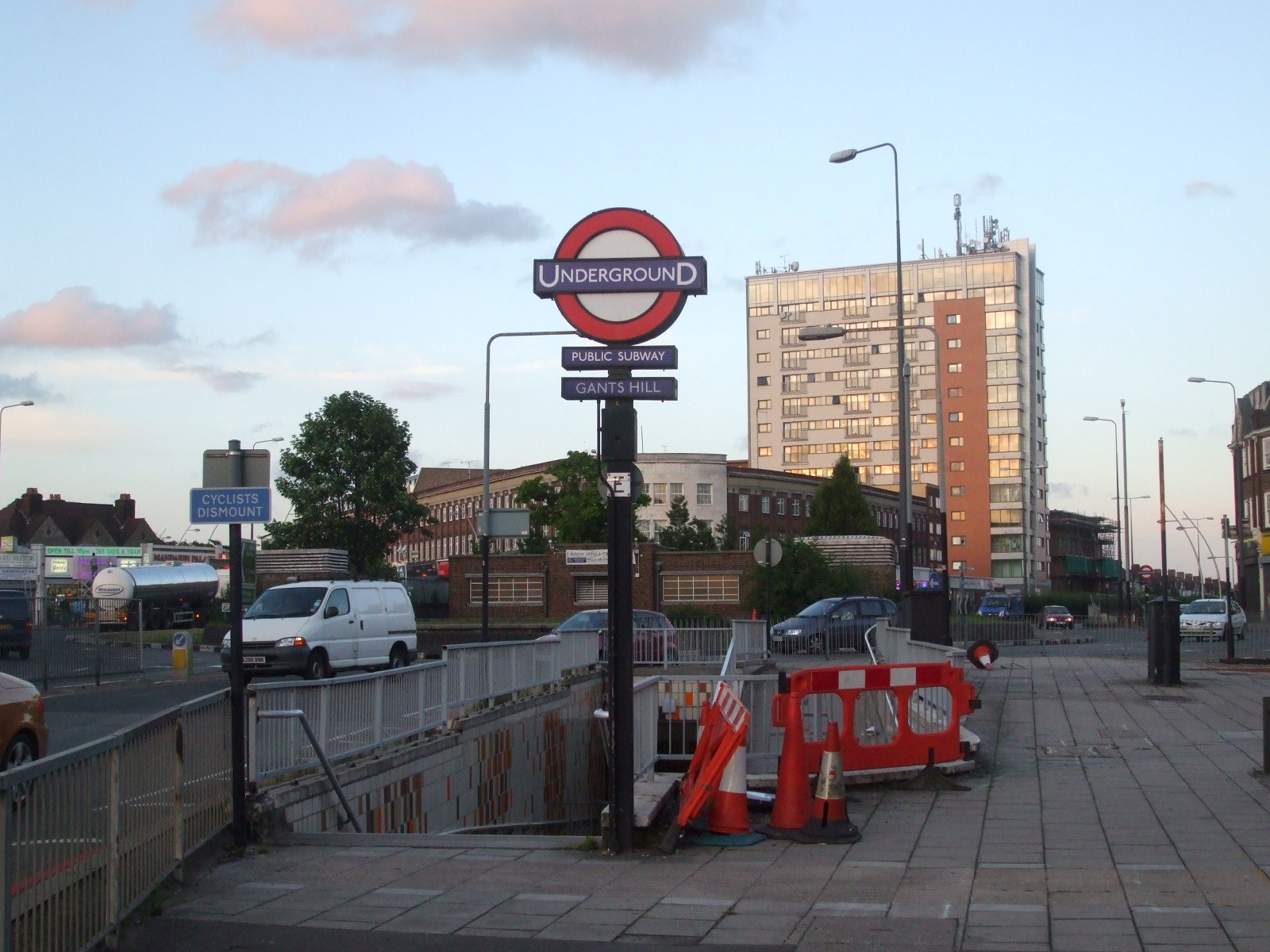
Gants Hill

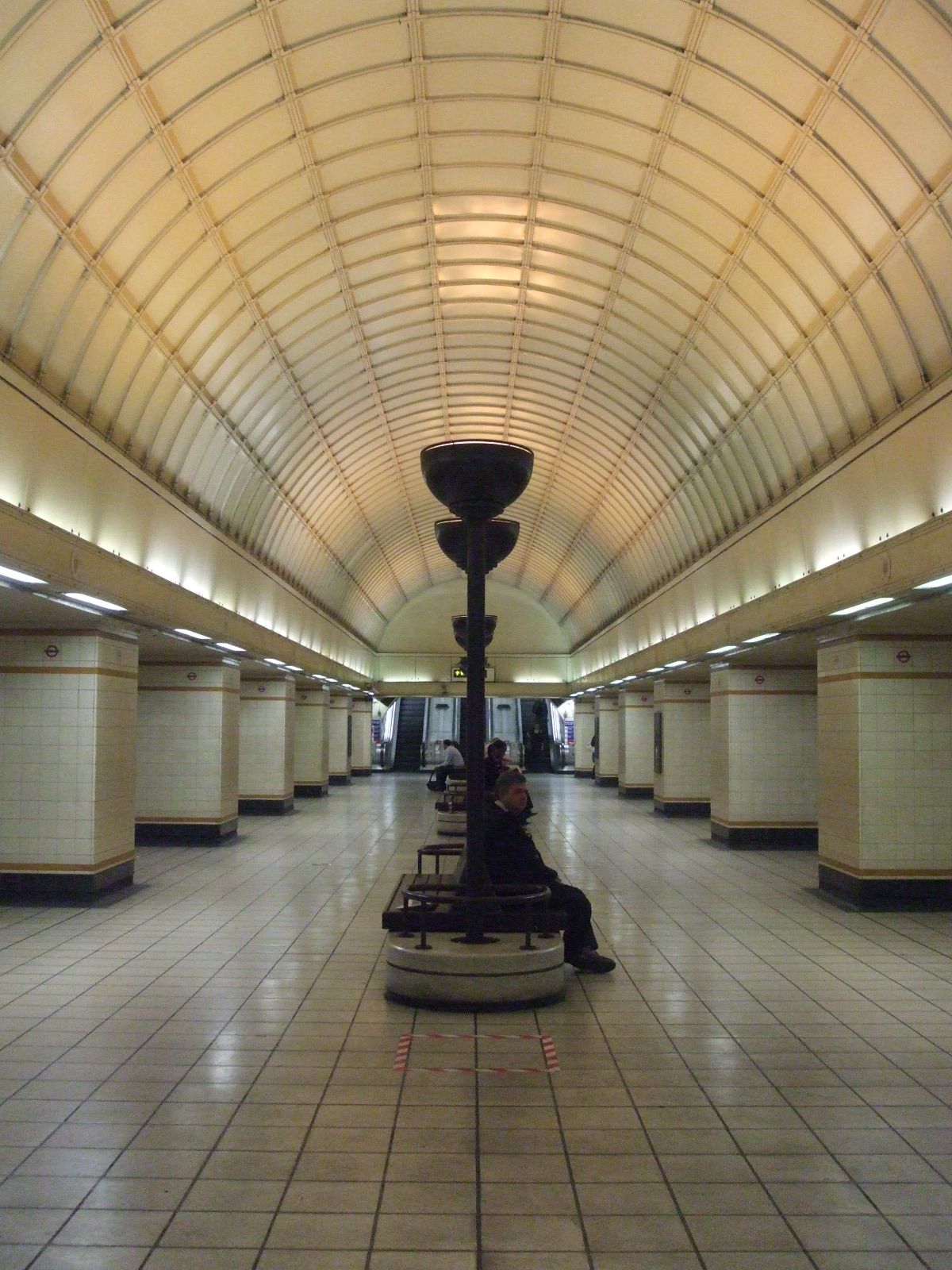
Gants Hill interior

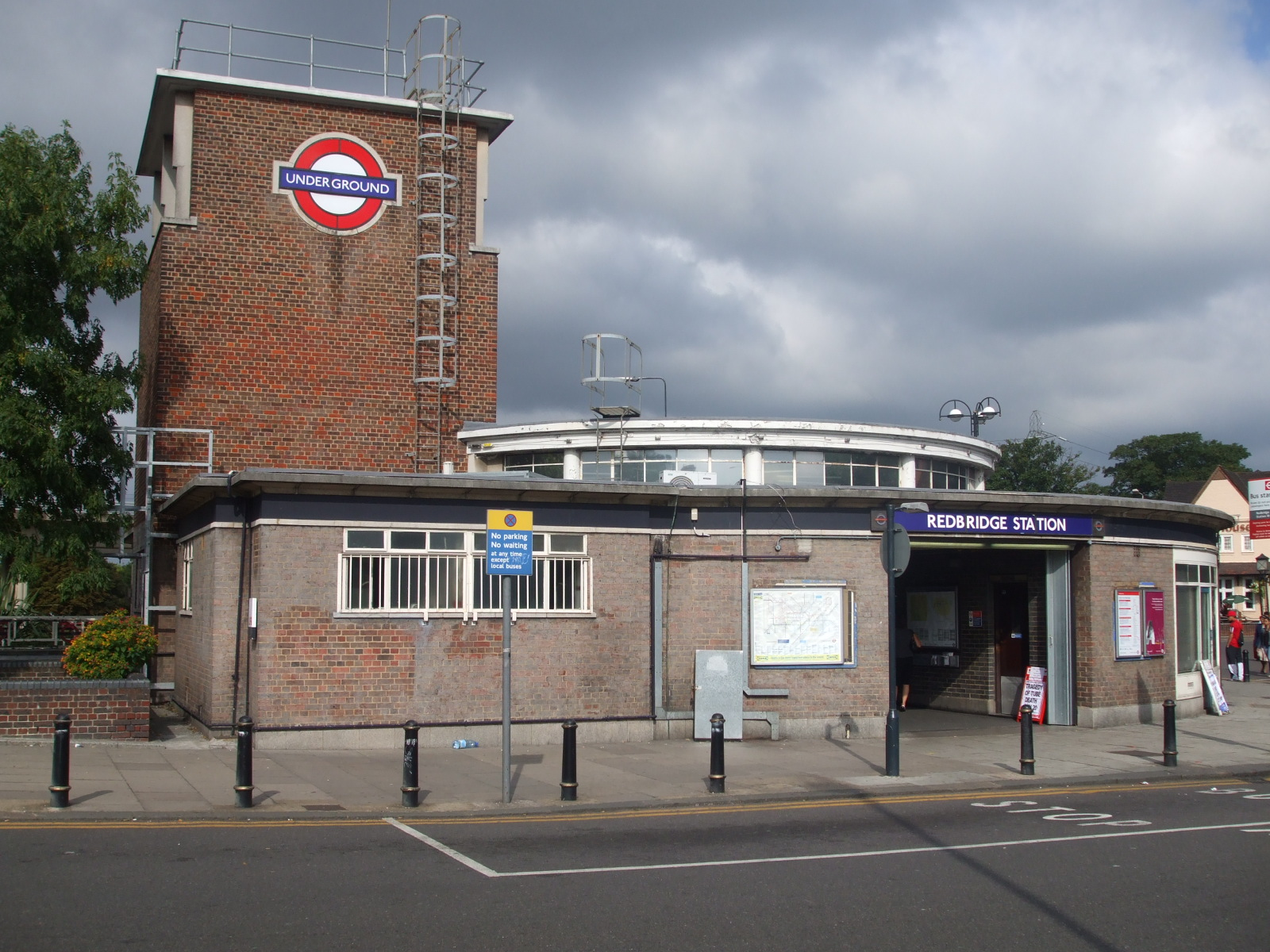
Redbridge

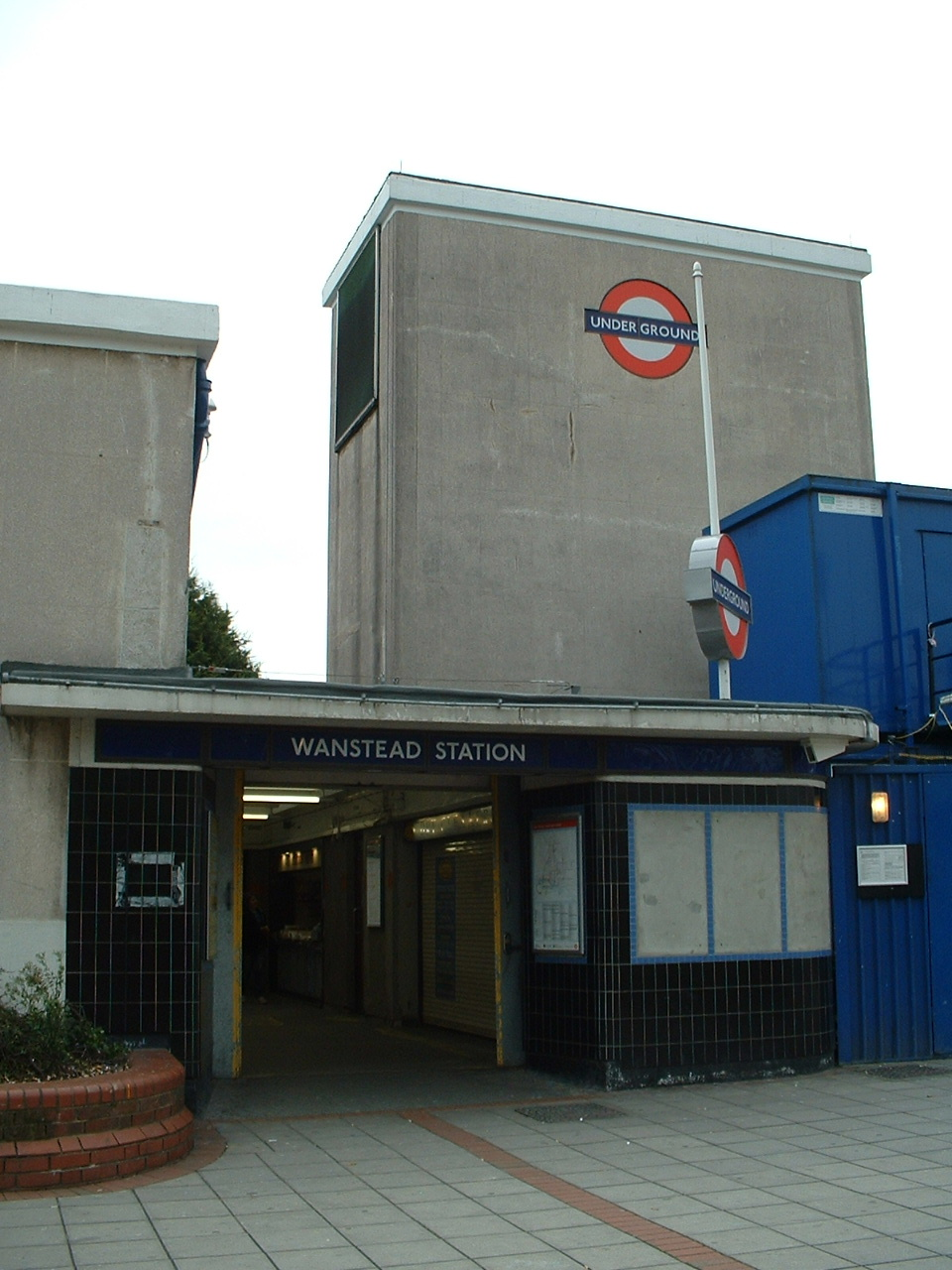
Wanstead

== Service pattern ==
=== Since 1947 (Central line) ===
Typical off-peak service pattern (as of 2007):

- Through trains central London - Leytonstone - Hainault via Newbury Park: every 6-10 mins until c. 01:00.
- as above but additionally Hainault - Woodford: every 20 mins until 24:00.
- additional trains from White City to Newbury Park, every 20 mins.

=== Before 1947 (GER/LNER) ===
Typical service pattern by 1933 (LNER):

- Half-hourly during the day, circular service typically London Liverpool Street - Stratford - Ilford - Woodford - Stratford - London Liverpool Street.

== Rolling stock ==
=== Since 1947 (Central line) ===
- Standard tube stock 1947-1963 (final withdrawal)
- 1959 tube stock 1960–1964
- 1962 tube stock 1962-1995 (final withdrawal)
- 1992 tube stock 1993–present
- Hainault - Woodford shuttle service saw a variety of stock from the early 1960s in conjunction with experimental Automatic Train Operation (ATO), such as 1960 tube stock and trials of both 1967 tube stock and modified 1973 tube stock, prior to introduction of the 1992 trains.

=== Before 1947 (GER/LNER) ===
- Steam locomotives included Holden 2-4-2T tank engines and Hill 0-6-2T tank engines built by the GER, and carriages were usually of the short wheelbase type, up to 16 per train.

== The closed connection today ==
The connection between Ilford/Seven Kings and Newbury Park is approximately 0.8 miles (1.3 km) long, and is still evident at ground level despite the track being lifted many years ago. From south to north, there are three road bridges - Vicarage Lane, Benton Road and Wards Road - crossing a missing alignment: much of the route was in a cutting that has been filled in since the line closed.

South of Newbury Park, the inclines to/from the tunnel portals towards Gants Hill diverge away from the former route. Immediately to the south is an electrical substation off Glebelands Avenue. Further south there is derelict land followed by a small area of allotment gardens north of Wards Road, with more allotments to the south and north of Benton Road. South of Benton Road, an outbuilding of St Aidan's School and Friars Close blocks of flats occupy the alignment as far south as Vicarage Lane. South of there are Piper Way flats just north of Ilford Carriage Sheds, the expansion of which followed the initial severing of the Newbury Park Junction to Ilford Carriage Sidings Junction curve in November 1947. The route was abandoned when the connecting curve to Seven Kings West Junction was lifted in 1956, the site of which is occupied by the depot's "New Shed", opened in 1959. Little evidence remains for the junctions at the main line ends.

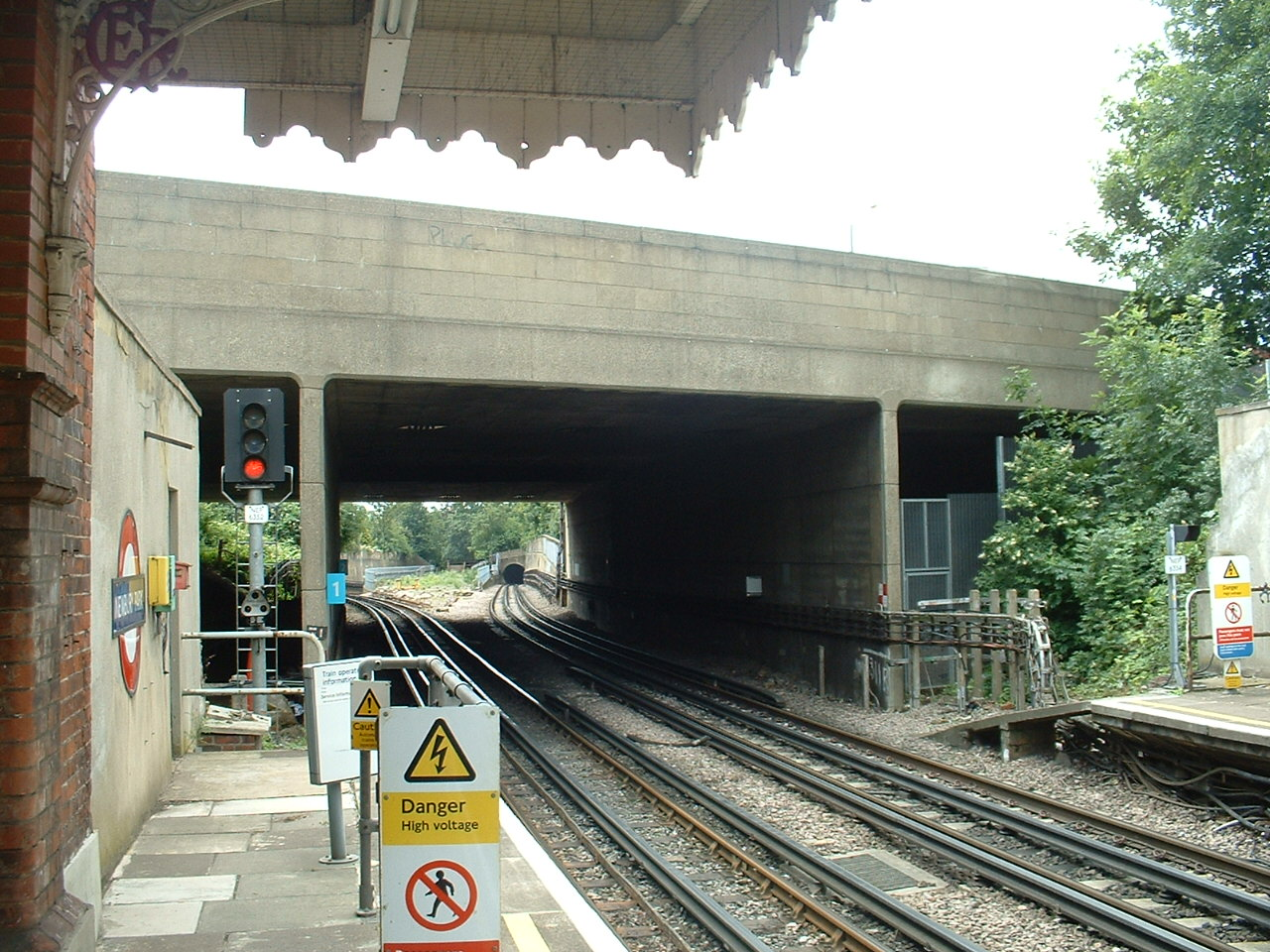
The A12 Eastern Avenue crosses the Central line just to the south of Newbury Park, with the eastbound tunnel portal to the right of the remains of the old route to Ilford.

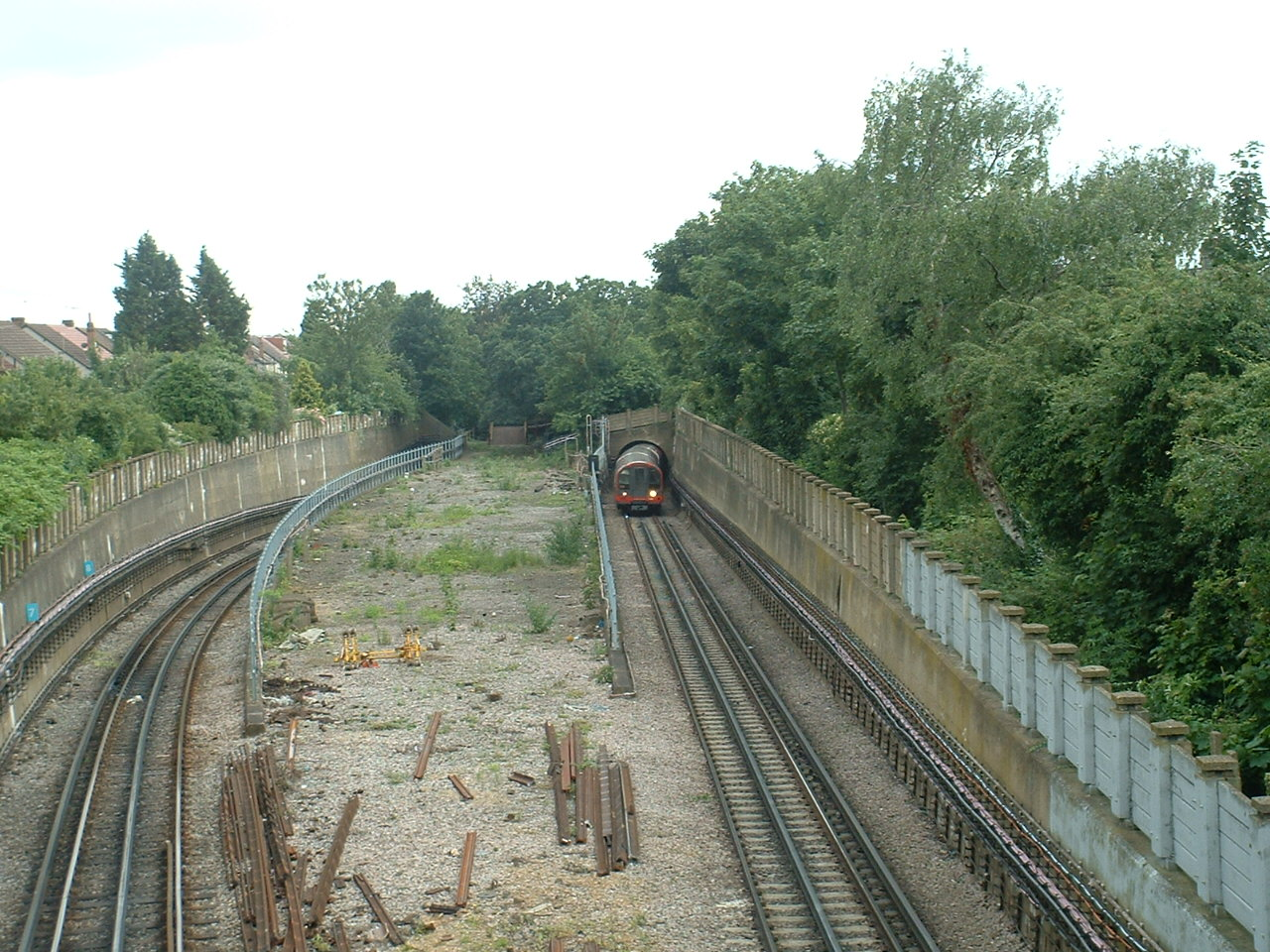
From the A12 looking south of Newbury Park showing the present route to Gants Hill diverging from the former alignment to Ilford and Seven Kings. An eastbound train has just emerged from the portal.

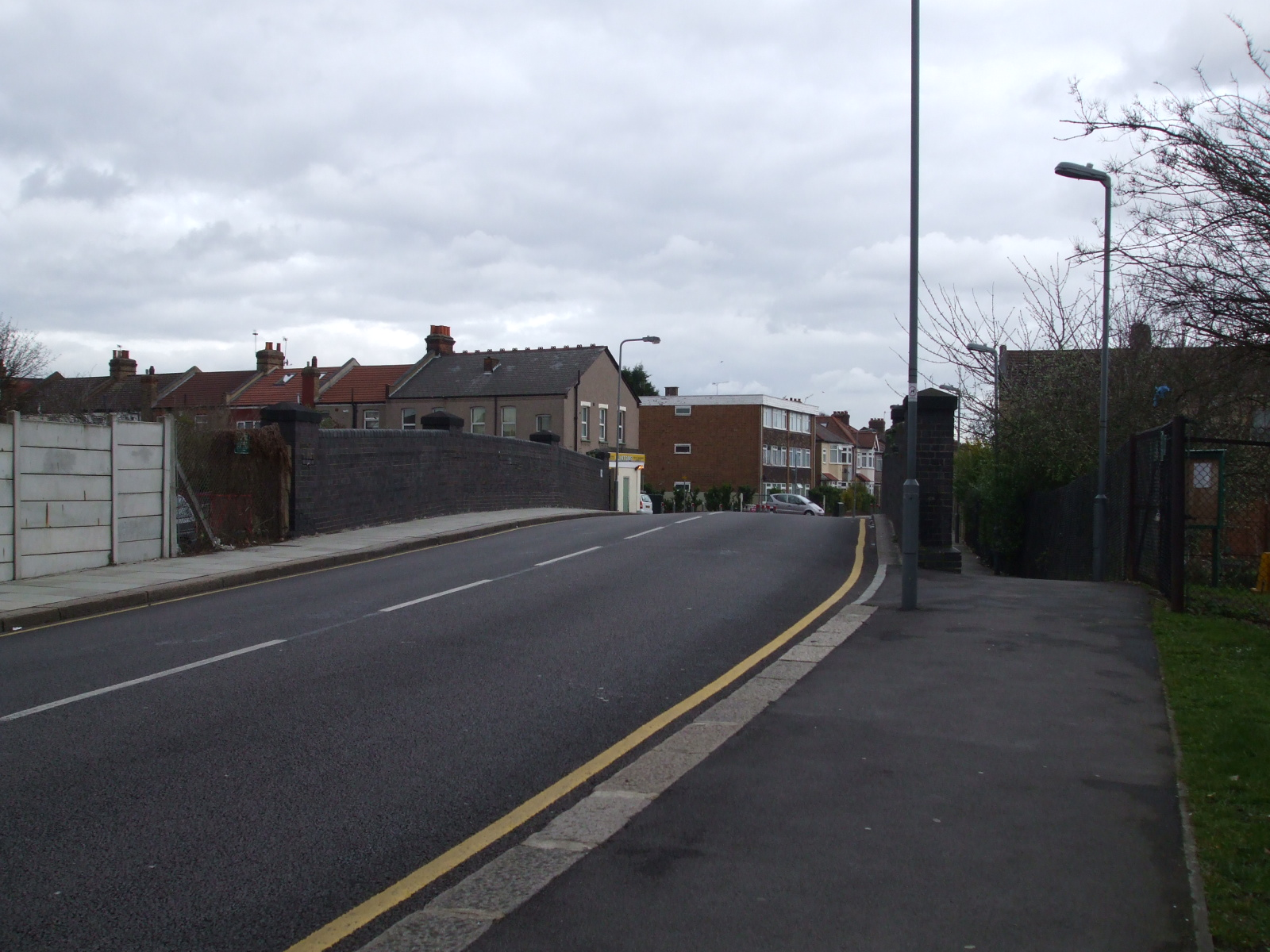
Bridge on Wards Road looking east. Newbury Park is a few hundred yards to the north: to the south and immediately to the north allotments occupy the alignment. The former route was in a cutting that has been filled in.

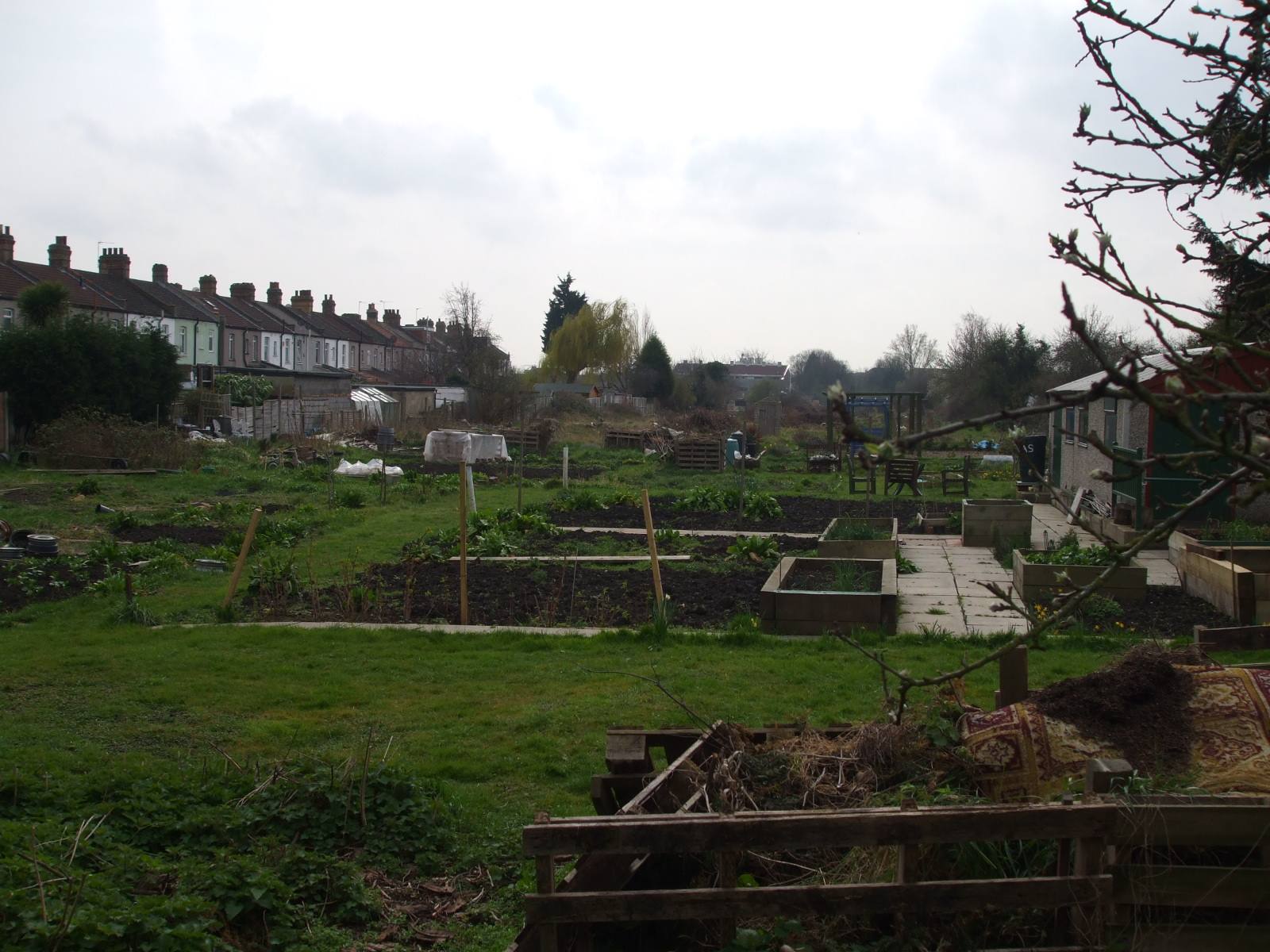
Looking south from Wards Road along the former alignment. Allotments now occupy the route as far as Benton Road just visible in the distance.

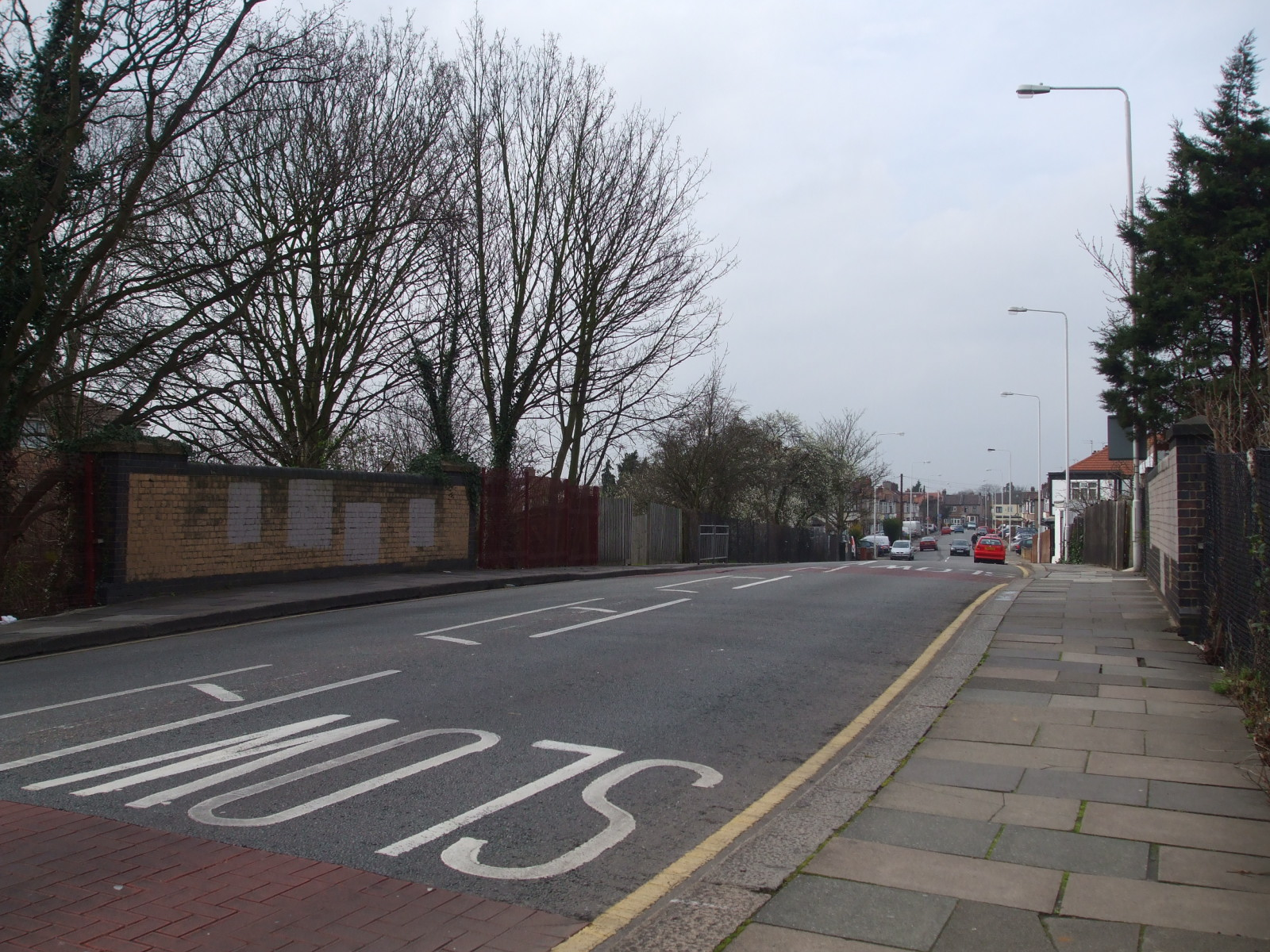
Looking west towards the bridge on Benton Road, similar to that on Wards Road but with pavements on both sides. The former route here was in a cutting.

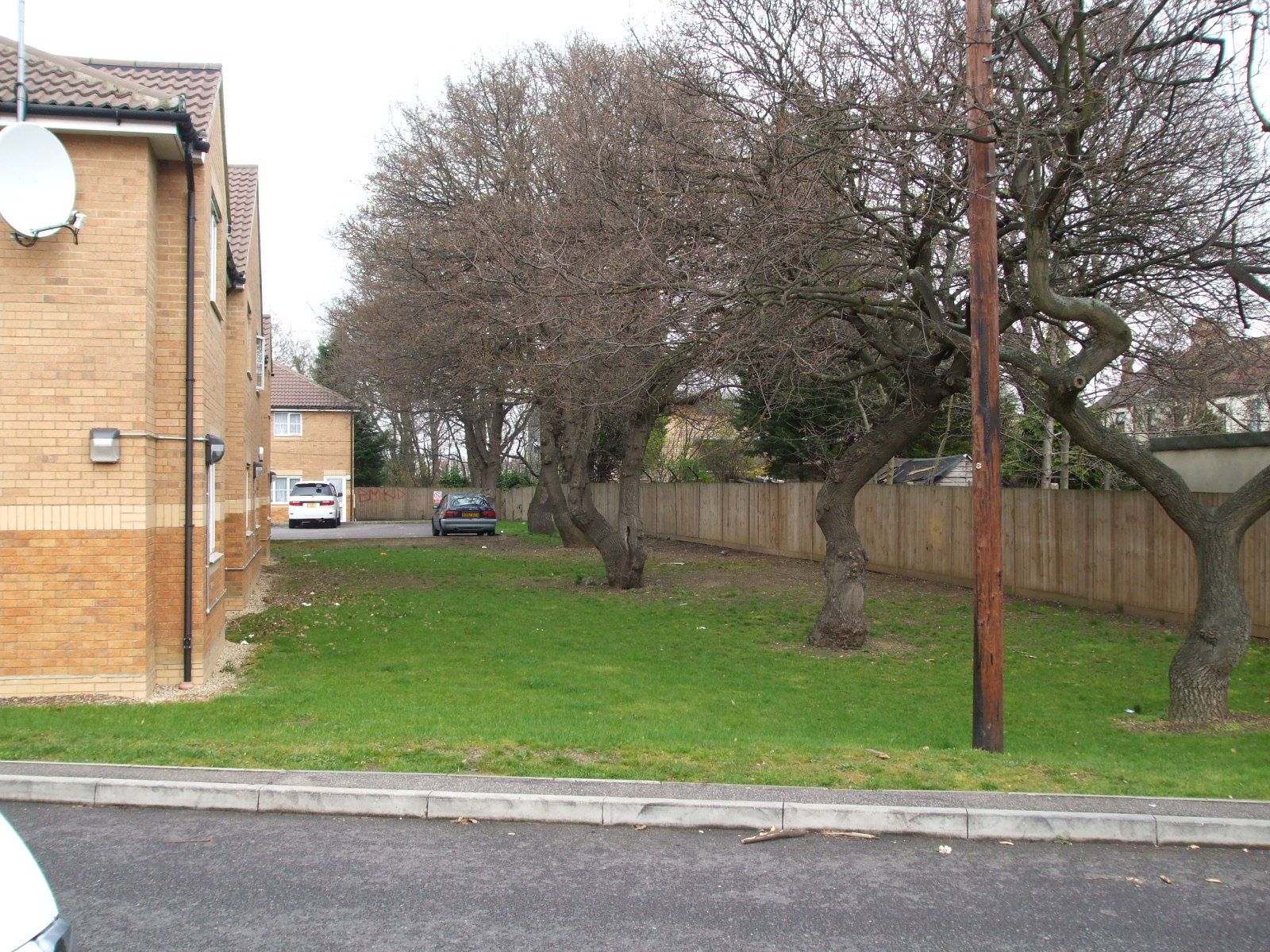
Looking north from the new Friars Close towards Benton Road, St Aidan's School lying just beyond the fence. Most, but not all, of the residential buildings lie just off the old alignment, marked by these trees.

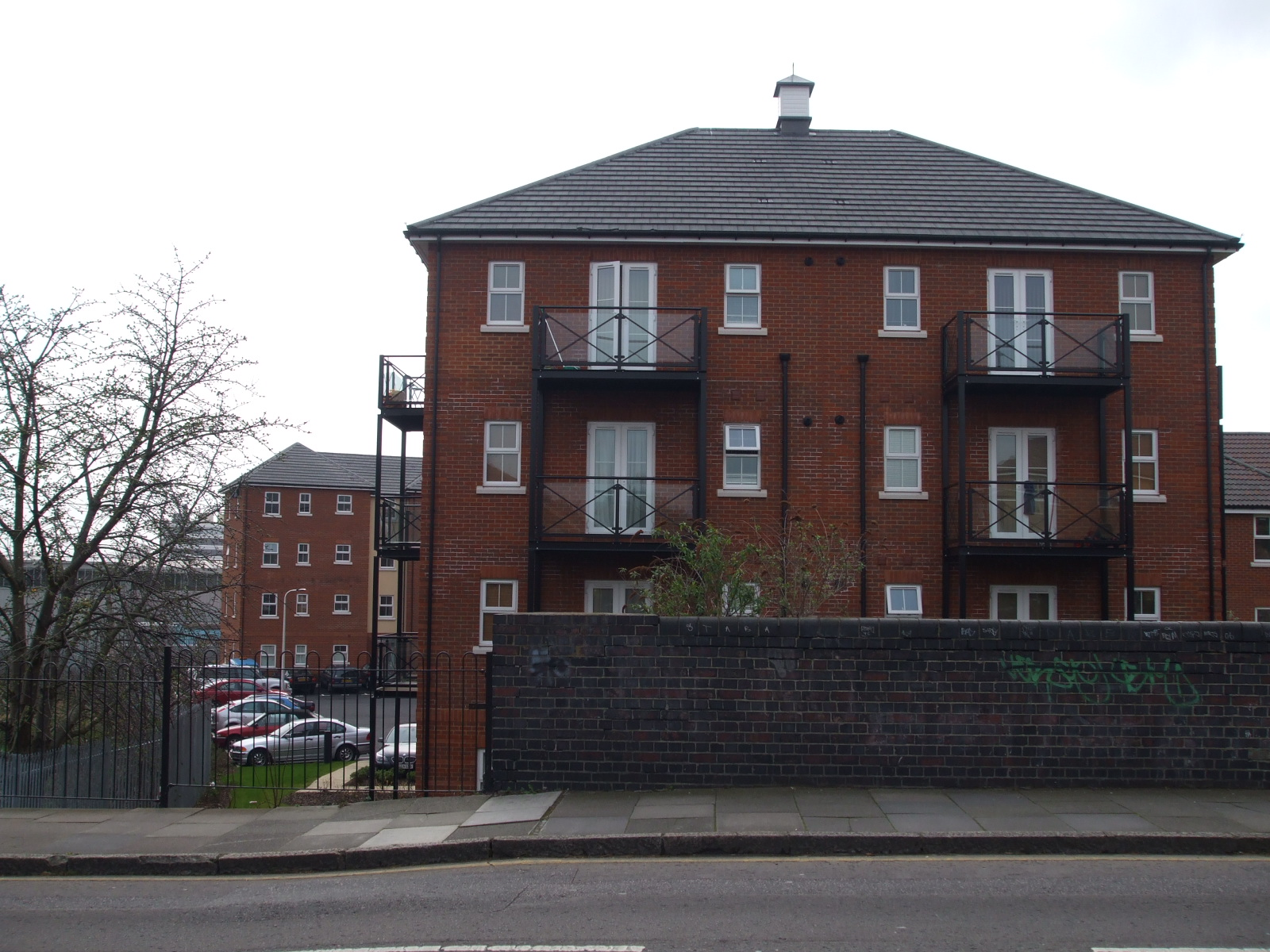
Looking south from Vicarage Lane towards the flats of the eastern half of the Piper Way development, new in 2008. The block of flats nearest the camera occupies the site of the old Newbury Park Junction. In the distance on the extreme left, part of Ilford Car Sheds is visible.

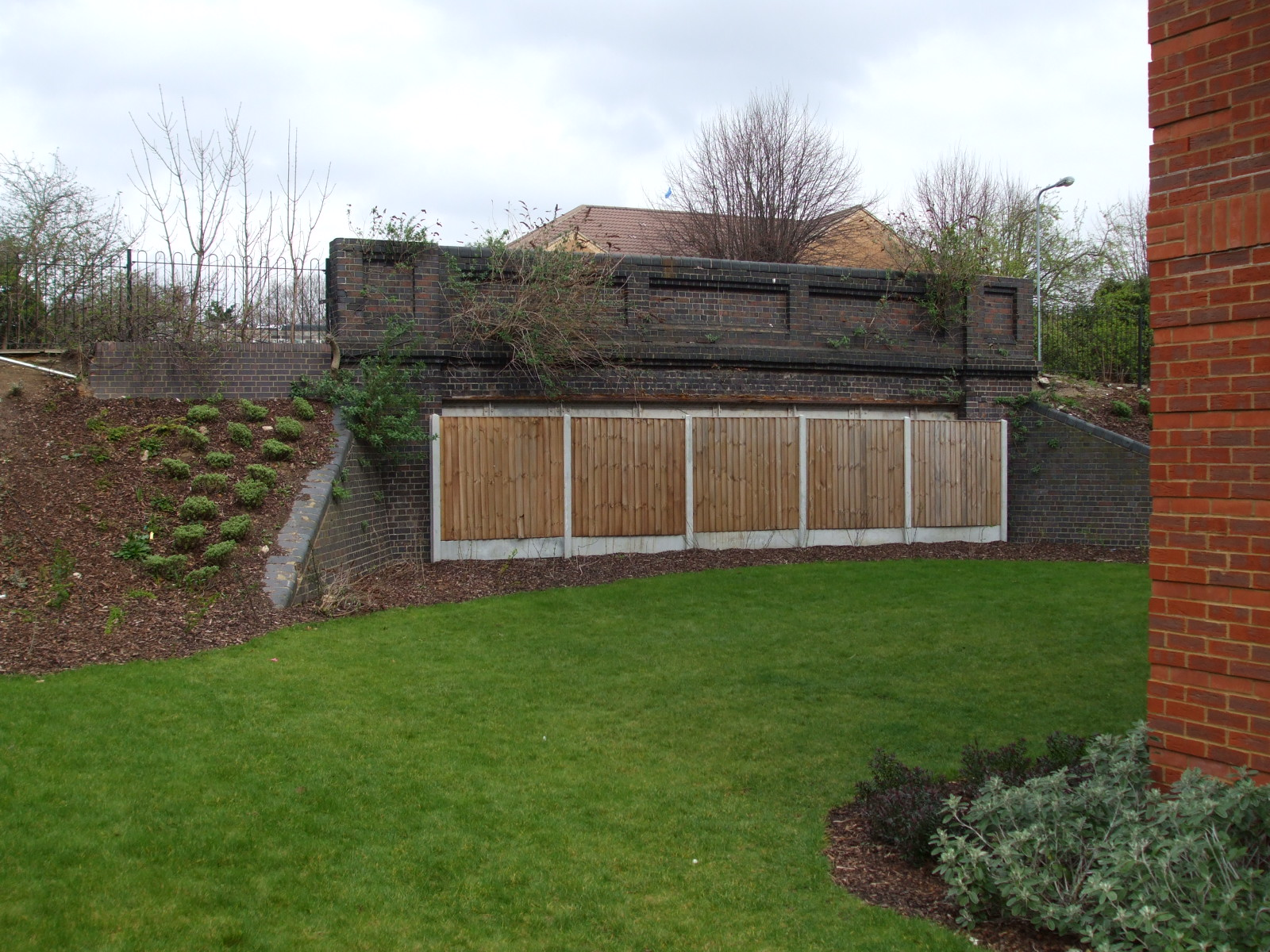
Looking north towards Vicarage Lane bridge from the blocks of flats on Piper Way, illustrating that the former route was still in a cutting this far south. The photo was taken on the site of the old Newbury Park Junction. Ilford Car Sheds lie directly to the south of this estate.

== Ilford to Newbury Park: modern alternatives ==
The recent construction of residential blocks and the long-standing and ongoing use of the alignment for allotment gardens mean that there can be no re-instatement of the line between Ilford and Newbury Park. The Central line serves both Stratford and Liverpool Street, just as Fairlop Loop services did, and to travel by rail between Newbury Park and Ilford requires a change of trains at Stratford. Alternatively, bus routes 296 and 396 serve both stations, and the 169 serves Ley Street and Horns Road, a few hundred yards west of Newbury Park. The 296 and 396 head west along the Eastern Avenue as far as Gants Hill before turning south, and the 169 is a less circuitous route.

== See also ==
- Epping Ongar Railway
- Great Eastern Railway
- London Transport Executive
