= Woodford tube station =

London Underground station

Woodford
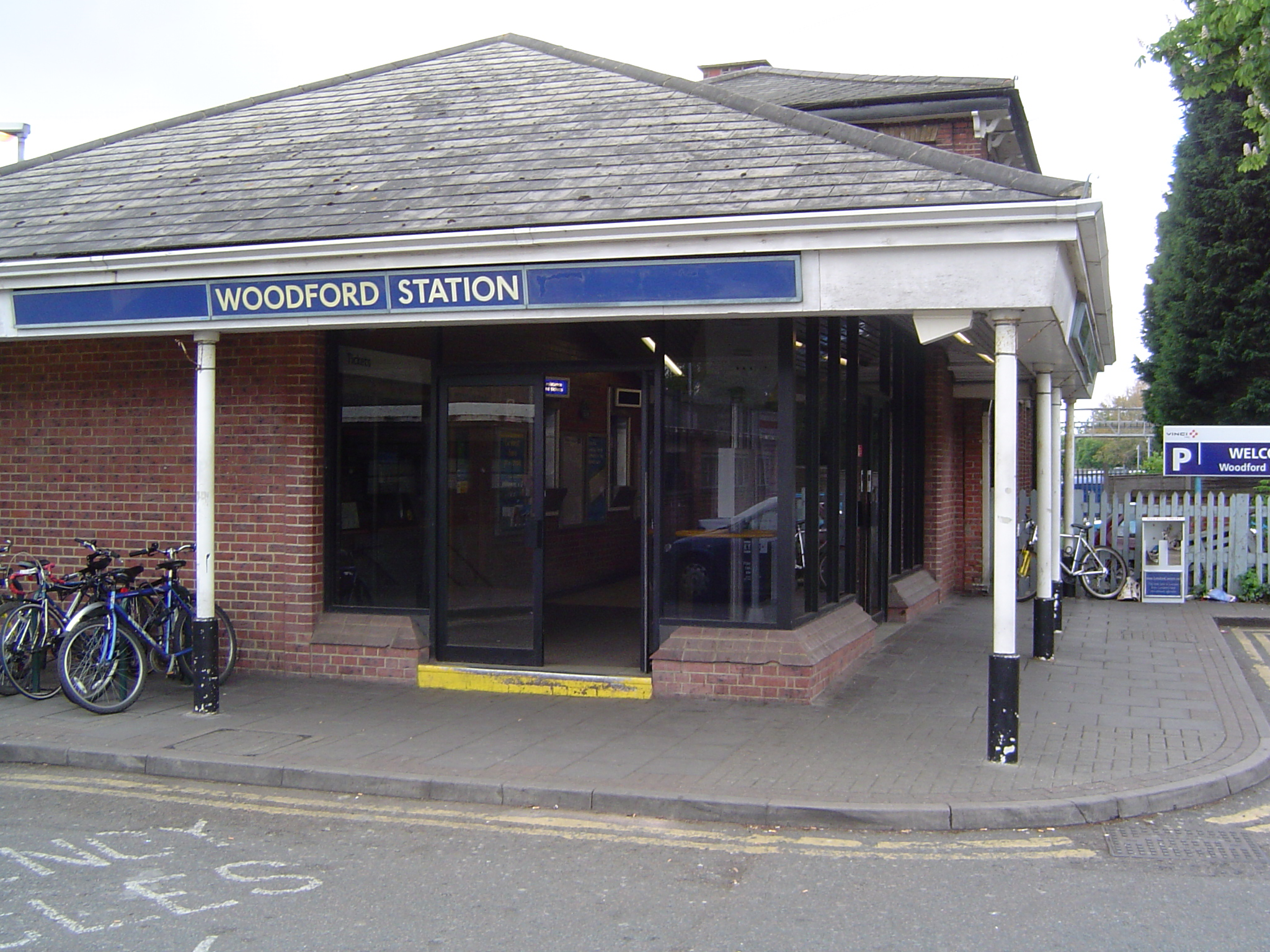
- Station entrance
- Interactive map of Woodford

General information
- Location: Woodford
- Local authority: London Borough of Redbridge
- Managed by: London Underground
- Number of platforms: 3
- Accessible: Yes
- Fare zone: 4

London Underground annual entry and exit
- 2021: ▼2.66 million
- 2022: ▲4.24 million
- 2023: ▲4.49 million
- 2024: ▼4.40 million
- 2025: ▼4.38 million

Key dates
- 1856: Opened
- 18 April 1966: Goods yard closed

Other information
- External links: TfL station info page
- Coordinates: 51.6060°N 0.0341°E

Woodford is a London Underground station in East London, England. It is located in the town of Woodford in the London Borough of Redbridge. The station is on the Central line, between South Woodford and Buckhurst Hill stations. It also acts as a terminus for the line via the Hainault loop and the next station via this loop is Roding Valley. The station is in London fare zone 4.

== History ==
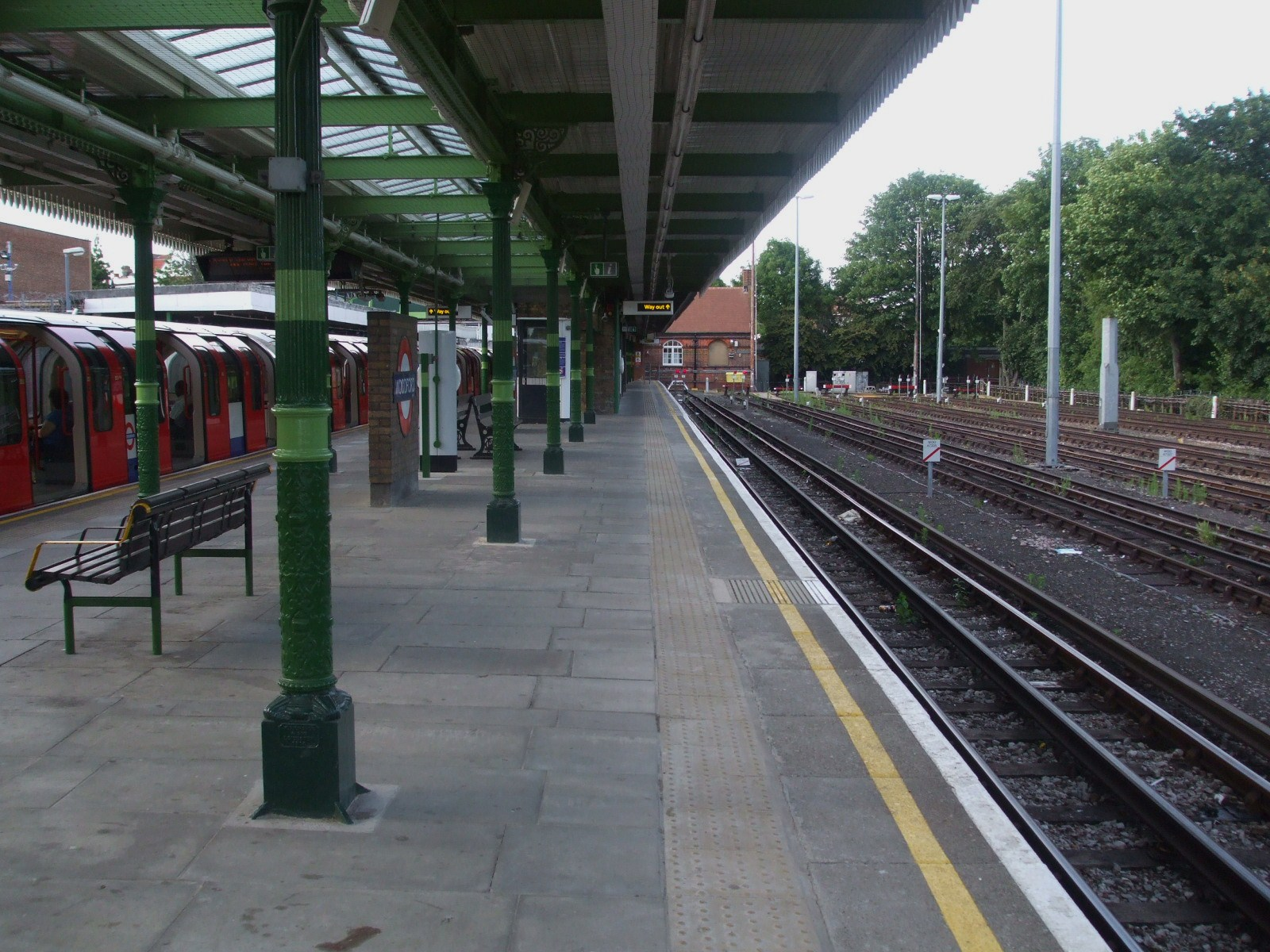
Bay platform looking north towards buffers, used by eastbound terminating trains from Central London. A westbound Central line train stands on the left.

The station was originally opened on 22 August 1856 as part of the Eastern Counties Railway branch from Leyton to Loughton. Further alterations were carried out by the successor company, the Great Eastern Railway, including services to Ilford via the Fairlop Loop opened between Woodford and Newbury Park in 1903. After 1923 the station came under the control of the London & North Eastern Railway until transfer to the London Passenger Transport Board (LPTB) on 14 December 1947 as part of the extension of the Central line services of the London Underground. The station acted as a terminus of the Central line, with passengers transferring to a steam shuttle onwards towards Epping, where the LNER still had local freight services running between Epping and Loughton, and continued to Stratford (Liverpool Street on Sundays) until 5 October 1970. The extension was delayed by World War II and electric services commenced as far as Loughton (and around the 'loop' to Hainault) on 21 November 1948.

As part of the electrification carried out for the transfer to the LPTB the original level crossing at the station, where Snakes Lane crossed the line, was closed and a bridge, to the south, was constructed. The original goods yard, which was closed in the late 1960s, now forms the car park.

During the planning of the Victoria line, route options included a continuation of the line from Walthamstow Central to Woodford or South Woodford stations. However, in 1961, the decision was taken to build only as far as Walthamstow Central.

== The station today ==
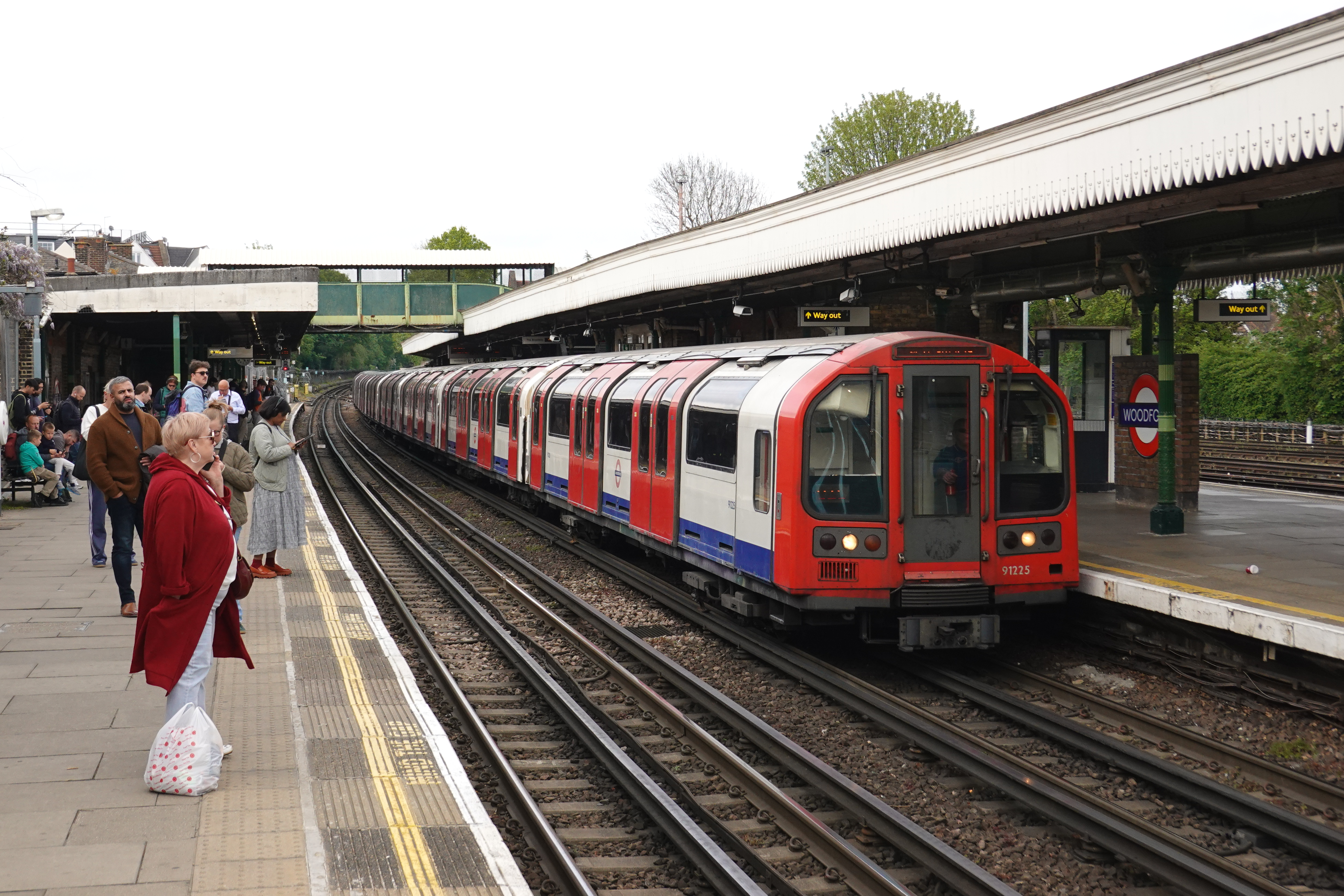
1992 Stock at Woodford, 2025

The main western entrance is located off The Broadway with access to the station car park. The eastern entrance is located on Snakes Lane East. This entrance is closed after 21:00 and intercom is used to ask staff to unlock the gates at other times if necessary. The ticket office on that entrance is also no longer in use. There are three platform tracks, serving a side platform to the west of the line and an island platform to the east, with the track on the eastern side of the island platform being a south facing terminal track. Beyond this terminal track are five stabling sidings, also accessed from the south.

The station had gone through refurbishment works. The stanchions have been repainted in two-tone green with tactile strips work completed. Extensive PA and Help Points have been added with new public address system. An 'owl' has also appeared suspended from the girder.

== Services ==
Woodford station is on the Central line in London fare zone 4. It is between South Woodford to the west and Buckhurst Hill to the east. It is also a terminus of the line via the Hainault loop and the next station via this loop is Roding Valley. Train frequencies vary throughout the day, but generally operate every 6–11 minutes between 05:22 and 00:49 eastbound to Epping, every 11–25 minutes between 06:48 and 23:37 to Hainault (and beyond) and every 5–10 minutes between 05:24 and 23:36 westbound.

As of 2020, the typical off-peak service, in trains per hour (tph), is:

- 9 tph between West Ruislip and Epping;
- 3 tph between Northolt and Loughton;
- 3 tph to Hainault via Grange Hill;

Preceding station	London Underground	Following station
South Woodford towards Ealing Broadway or West Ruislip	Central line Main line	Buckhurst Hill towards Epping
Roding Valley towards Ealing Broadway or West Ruislip	Central line via Hainault loop	Terminus
Historical railways
George Lane; Line and station open	Great Eastern Railway; Eastern Counties Railway Loughton branch	Buckhurst Hill; Line and station open
George Lane; Line and station open	Great Eastern Railway; Woodford and Ilford line	Chigwell; Line and station open

== Connections ==
London Bus routes serve the station.
