= List of London Underground stations =

An unofficial topological tube map of the London Underground system. Also included are the London Overground, Docklands Light Railway, the Tramlink and Elizabeth line systems for integration purposes.

The London Underground is a metro system in the United Kingdom that serves Greater London and the home counties of Buckinghamshire, Essex and Hertfordshire. Its first section opened in 1863, making it the oldest underground metro system in the world – although approximately 55% of the current network is above ground, as it generally runs on the surface in outlying suburbs.

The system is composed of 11 lines – Bakerloo, Central, Circle, District, Hammersmith & City, Jubilee, Metropolitan, Northern, Piccadilly, Victoria, and Waterloo & City – serving 272 stations. It is operated by Transport for London (TfL).

Most of the system is north of the River Thames, with six of the London boroughs in the south of the city not served by the Underground. The London Borough of Hackney, to the north, has two stations on its border. Some stations at the north-eastern end of the Central line are in the Epping Forest district of Essex and some stations at the north-western end of the Metropolitan line are in the Three Rivers and Watford districts of Hertfordshire, and Buckinghamshire.

There are two instances where two separate stations share the same name: there is one Edgware Road station on the Circle, District, and Hammersmith & City lines and another on the Bakerloo line; and there is one Hammersmith station on the District and Piccadilly lines and another on the Circle and Hammersmith & City lines. Although the Circle and Hammersmith & City lines station at Paddington is on the other side of the main line station to the Bakerloo, Circle and District lines station, it is shown as a single station on the current Tube map, but still counted as two in the official station count. It has been shown as two separate stations at different times in the past.

The opening of the Northern line extension to Battersea in September 2021 added two new stations to the network (Battersea Power Station and Nine Elms), bringing the total to 272.

== Stations ==
Listed for each of the 272 stations are the lines serving it, local authority, the fare zone in which it is located, the date it and any earlier main line service opened, previous names and passenger usage statistics in millions per year.

Station	Photograph	Line(s) (Note: Where more than one line serves a station, lines are listed in the order of opening. In some cases stations were first served by one underground line but later transferred to another.)	Local authority	Zone (Note: Some stations are assigned to multiple zones.)	Opened	Resited	Main line opened	Other name(s) (Note: The other names listed may have been used previously on station signage, on network maps, in advertisements or in planning material.) (Note: In the early years, slightly different names were sometimes employed contemporaneously for different purposes or on different parts of a station. A number of stations continue to bear obsolete early names where these form part of the physical architecture. For example, the platform wall tiling at Arsenal, Hampstead, Marylebone and Warren Street still carries the original names of these stations.)	Annual usage (millions, 2024)	Area served
Acton Town	A brown-bricked building with a flat-slabbed roof and six columns of windows on the front face standing below a blue sky with white clouds	District; Piccadilly	Ealing	3	1 Jul 1879			Mill Hill Park: 1879–1910	5.06	Acton
Aldgate	A light grey building with "M.R. ALDGATE STATION M.R." written in stone on the front face and a black car driving in the foreground	Met. (Note: First served by Metropolitan line – Circle line services separately identified in 1949.); Circle	City of London	1	18 Nov 1876				7.59	Portsoken
Aldgate East	A building flanked by green, wooden walls with three people standing outside and one person walking by all under a clear, blue sky	H&C (Note: First served by Metropolitan line – Hammersmith & City line services separately identified in 1990.); District	Tower Hamlets	1	6 Oct 1884	31 Oct 1938		Commercial Road: proposed before opening	12.32	Whitechapel
Alperton	A red-bricked building with a grey-slabbed roof and "ALPERTON STATION" written in stone just under the roof all under a blue sky with white clouds	Piccadilly (Note: First served by District line – service transferred to Piccadilly line in 1933.)	Brent	4	28 Jun 1903			Perivale-Alperton: 1903–1910	2.59	Alperton
Amersham	A long building with two chimneys protruding from its roof and four cars driving from left to right across a paved area in the foreground	Met.	Buckinghamshire	9	1 Sep 1892			Amersham: 1892–1922; Amersham & Chesham Bois: 1922–1934	1.90	Amersham
Angel	The interior of a building with a rounded roof and walls, several doors on the right, railway tracks on the left, and three people walking in the middle	Northern	Islington	1	17 Nov 1901				12.68	Angel
Archway	A doorway with a sign above it stating "ARCHWAY STATION" in white letters on a blue background all under two large, grey vents that are side-by-side	Northern	Islington	2; 3	22 Jun 1907			Archway Tavern: proposed before opening; Highgate: 1907–1939; Archway (Highgate): 1939–1941; Highgate (Archway): 1941–1947	7.33	Archway
Arnos Grove	A building with a rectangular first floor and a circular second floor composed of red-bricked walls, a grey-slabbed roof, and several columns of windows	Piccadilly	Enfield	4	19 Sep 1932			Bowes Road: proposed before opening	3.29	Arnos Grove
Arsenal	A light grey building with a sign stating "ARSENAL STATION" in white letters on a blue background and four bicycles laying idle in the foreground	Piccadilly	Islington	2	15 Dec 1906			Gillespie Road: 1906–1932; Arsenal (Highbury Hill): 1932–c. 1960	2.27	Highbury
Baker Street	A street filled with people in front of a light grey building that has variously coloured signs protruding from it stating a variety of different things	Met. (Note: First served by Metropolitan line – Circle line services separately identified in 1949, Hammersmith & City line services separately identified in 1990.); Bakerloo; Circle; Jubilee; H&C	City of Westminster	1	10 Jan 1863				22.92	Marylebone
Balham	A street with twelve people walking on it and two cars driving on it with three buildings in the background and a grey sky overhead	Northern	Wandsworth	3	6 Dec 1926				10.24	Balham
Bank	The interior of a building with a rounded roof and walls, a grey door on the left, a railway track on the right, and a man walking in the middle	W&C; Northern; Central	City of London	1	8 Aug 1898			City [W&C]: 1898–1940; Lombard Street [Northern]: proposed before opening	40.07 (Note: Bank and Monument operate as a combined station with shared usage statistics.)	City of London
Barbican	A red train with a grey top and a black sign that reads "CIRCLE LINE" in yellow letters is on railway tracks leading from the background to the foreground.	Met.; Circle; H&C	City of London	1	23 Dec 1865			Aldersgate Street: 1865–1910; Aldersgate: 1910–1923; Aldersgate & Barbican: 1923–1968	5.38	Barbican
Barking	A grey building with windows stands under a clear, blue sky as people mill about on the sidewalk in front of the building and vehicles traverse the foreground.	District (Note: First served by District line – Metropolitan line service added in stages which was transferred to Hammersmith & City line in 1990.); H&C	Barking and Dagenham	4	2 Jun 1902		13 Jun 1854		18.23	Barking
Barkingside	A red-bricked building with a sloping, black roof, four chimneys, and a sign that reads "UNDERGROUND" under a blue sky with white clouds	Central	Redbridge	4	31 May 1948		1 May 1903		1.26	Barkingside
Barons Court	A brown building with a sign that reads "BARONS COURT STATION DISTRICT RAILWAY" under a blue sky with white clouds with two cars in the foreground	District; Piccadilly	Hammersmith and Fulham	2	9 Oct 1905				5.73	West Kensington
Battersea Power Station	A single-storey building with a wide projecting canopy with the Underground sign on the side	Northern	Wandsworth	1	20 Sep 2021			Battersea: proposed	9.23	Battersea
Bayswater	A white-bricked building with a clear, sloped roof and a sign that reads "BAYSWATER STATION" in white letters on a blue background	District (Note: First served by Metropolitan line – District line service added in stages, Circle line services separately identified in 1949.); Circle	City of Westminster	1	1 Oct 1868			Bayswater: 1868–1923; Bayswater (Queen's Road) & Westbourne Grove: 1923–1933; Bayswater (Queen's Road): 1933–1946; Bayswater (Queensway): 1946, suffix gradually dropped	3.86	Bayswater
Becontree	A red-bricked building with five people standing in front of it and a blue sign reading "BECONTREE STATION" all under a clear, blue sky	District	Barking and Dagenham	5	18 Jul 1932		28 Jun 1926	Gale Street: 1926–1932	2.96	Becontree
Belsize Park	A red-bricked building with eight people standing in front of it and a blue sign reading "BELSIZE PARK STATION" in white letters all under a bright sky	Northern	Camden	2	22 Jun 1907			Belsize: proposed before opening	5.27	Belsize Park
Bermondsey	A grey building with a blue sign reading "BERMONDSEY STATION" in white letters and four bicycles lying idle in the foreground all under a blue sky	Jubilee	Southwark	2	17 Sep 1999				7.32	Bermondsey
Bethnal Green	The interior of a building with a rounded roof and walls, a railway track on the left, some doors on the right, and a man walking in the middle	Central	Tower Hamlets	2	4 Dec 1946			Bethnal: proposed before opening	10.12	Bethnal Green
Blackfriars	A red and grey train with a black sign that reads "UPMINSTER" in yellow letters is on railway tracks leading from the background to the foreground.	District (Note: First served by District line – Circle line services separately identified in 1949.); Circle	City of London	1	30 May 1870				11.14	Blackfriars
Blackhorse Road	A building with a blue sign reading "BLACKHORSE ROAD STATION" in white letters and several people and cars in the foreground all under a blue sky	Victoria	Waltham Forest	3	1 Sep 1968				9.47	Walthamstow
Bond Street	The interior of a building with a rounded ceiling and walls and doors on the left, a railway track on the right, and people walking in the middle	Central; Jubilee	City of Westminster	1	24 Sep 1900			Davies Street: proposed before opening; Selfridge's: proposed 1909	41.11	Mayfair
Borough	A brown- and tan-tiled building with a blue sign reading "BOROUGH STATION" in white letters and several people walking around all under a blue sky	Northern	Southwark	1	18 Dec 1890				4.18	Southwark
Boston Manor	A red-bricked building with a blue sign reading "BOSTON MANOR STATION" and a person in the foreground all under a blue sky with white clouds	Piccadilly (Note: First served by District line – service transferred to Piccadilly line in 1964.)	Hounslow	4	1 May 1883			Boston Road: 1883–1911	1.42	Hanwell
Bounds Green	A red-bricked building with a blue sign reading "BOUNDS GREEN" in white letters and several people walking in the foreground all under a blue sky	Piccadilly	Haringey	3; 4	19 Sep 1932			Brownlow Road: proposed before opening	4.32	Bounds Green
Bow Road	A red-bricked building with a blue sign reading "BOW ROAD STATION" in white letters and a tree in the foreground all under a blue sky with white clouds	District; H&C	Tower Hamlets	2	11 Jun 1902				4.35	Bow
Brent Cross	A red-bricked building with "BRENT CROSS STATION" written on it and light grey pillars making up the facade all under a blue sky with white clouds	Northern	Barnet	3	19 Nov 1923			Brent: 1923–1976	1.82	Brent Cross
Brixton		Victoria	Lambeth	2	23 Jul 1971				21.39	Brixton
Bromley-by-Bow	Three people walking on a platform, the one on the left boarding a train, the one in the middle carrying bags, and the one on the right walking through a door	District; H&C	Tower Hamlets	2; 3	2 Jun 1902		31 Mar 1858	Bromley: 1858–1968	3.92	Bromley-by-Bow
Buckhurst Hill	A red-bricked building with a blue sign reading "BUCKHURST HILL STATION" in white letters and four cars parked in the foreground	Central	Epping Forest	5	21 Nov 1948		22 Aug 1856		2.24	Buckhurst Hill
Burnt Oak	A red-bricked building with a blue sign reading "BURNT OAK STATION" in white letters and four surveillance cameras in front of the doors	Northern	Barnet	4	27 Oct 1924			Sheaves Hill: proposed before opening; Burnt Oak: 1924–1928; Burnt Oak (for Watling): 1928, suffix gradually dropped	4.69	Burnt Oak
Caledonian Road	A red-bricked building with "CALEDONIAN RD." in gold letters and a blue sign reading "CALEDONIAN ROAD STATION" in white letters below	Piccadilly	Islington	2	15 Dec 1906			Barnsbury: proposed before opening	3.85	Holloway
Camden Town	A red-bricked building with a blue sign reading "CAMDEN TOWN STATION" in white letters and a red sign reading "FIRST CHOICE RESTAURANT" in white letters	Northern	Camden	2	22 Jun 1907			Camden Road: proposed before opening	18.77	Camden Town
Canada Water	A circular building that has large windows making up its walls so that the interior of the building is visible and the building's surroundings are partially reflected	Jubilee	Southwark	2	17 Sep 1999				10.15	Canada Water
Canary Wharf	A wide, grey archway with a blue sign reading "CANARY WHARF STATION" in white letters and a man in a black suit walking through	Jubilee	Tower Hamlets	2	17 Sep 1999				33.18	Canary Wharf
Canning Town	A grey building with a black top and a blue sign reading "CANNING TOWN STATION" in white letters all under a blue sky with white clouds	Jubilee	Newham	2; 3	14 May 1999		14 Jun 1847		12.62	Canning Town
Cannon Street	A building with four people walking in front of it, one man in a white shirt sitting in front of it, and one white vehicle driving in front of it	District; Circle	City of London	1	6 Oct 1884				4.31	City of London
Canons Park	A railway platform with a railway track running through it from the left portion of the background to the right portion of the foreground	Jubilee (Note: First served by Metropolitan line – service transferred to Bakerloo line in 1939 and then to the Jubilee line in 1979.)	Harrow	5	10 Dec 1932			Canons Park (Edgware): 1932–1933	2.22	Stanmore
Chalfont & Latimer	A brown-bricked building with two brown-bricked chimneys, some trees in the background, and a speed bump in the foreground all under a blue sky	Met.	Buckinghamshire	8	8 Jul 1889			Chalfont Road: 1889–1915	1.52	Little Chalfont
Chalk Farm	A red-bricked building with a blue sign reading "UNDERGROUND" in white letters such that the "U" and the "D" are larger than the rest of the letters	Northern	Camden	2	22 Jun 1907			Adelaide Road: proposed before opening	4.94	Chalk Farm
Chancery Lane	A staircase leading down below a sidewalk with a sign above reading "UNDERGROUND" in white letters on a blue rectangle in front of a red circle	Central	City of London; Camden	1	30 Jul 1900			Chancery Lane: 1900–1934; Chancery Lane (Grays Inn): 1934, suffix gradually dropped	8.72	Holborn
Charing Cross	The interior of a building with a rounded ceiling and walls, three benches on the left, a railway track on the right, and advertisements on the walls	Bakerloo; Northern	City of Westminster	1	10 Mar 1906			Trafalgar Square [Bakerloo]: 1906–1979; Charing Cross [Northern]: 1907–1914; Charing Cross (Strand) [Northern]: 1914–1915; Strand [Northern]: 1915–1979	16.51	Charing Cross
Chesham	A grey railway platform with a series of light poles surrounded by brown trees, green bushes, and yellow and white flowers all under a white sky	Met.	Buckinghamshire	9	8 Jul 1889				1.02	Chesham
Chigwell	A brown-bricked building with a black roof and a blue sign that reads "CHIGWELL STATION" in white letters all under a white sky	Central	Epping Forest	4	21 Nov 1948		1 May 1903		0.31	Chigwell
Chiswick Park	A brown-bricked building with a light blue strip over the doorway containing a darker blue sign reading "CHISWICK PARK STATION" in white letters	District	Ealing	3	1 Jul 1879			Acton Green: 1879–1887; Chiswick Park & Acton Green: 1887–1910	2.19	Chiswick
Chorleywood	A small, brown-bricked building with a brown-shingled roof and a silver, two-wheeled vehicle sitting idle in front all under a white sky	Met.	Three Rivers	7	8 Jul 1889			Chorley Wood: 1889–1915; Chorley Wood & Chenies: 1915–1934; Chorley Wood: 1934–1964	1.40	Chorleywood
Clapham Common	A pink-tiled building topped by a silver dome culminating in a silver ball all surrounded by people under a white sky with green trees in the background	Northern	Lambeth	2	3 Jun 1900				8.12	Clapham
Clapham North	A white- and grey-bricked building with a blue sign reading "CLAPHAM NORTH STATION" in white letters all under a blue sky with white clouds	Northern	Lambeth	2	3 Jun 1900			Clapham Road: 1900–1926	5.18	Clapham
Clapham South	A light-grey-tiled building with a blue sign reading "CLAPHAM SOUTH STATION" in white letters and a woman walking in front wearing a black jacket	Northern	Wandsworth	2; 3	13 Sep 1926			Nightingale Lane: proposed before opening	6.61	Clapham
Cockfosters	The interior of a building with a black sign suspended from the ceiling reading "PLEASE WAIT IN THIS AREA UNTIL PLATFORM IS INDICATED"	Piccadilly	Enfield	5	31 Jul 1933			Trent Park: proposed before opening	1.47	Cockfosters
Colindale	Colindale	Northern	Barnet	4	18 Aug 1924				0.00	Colindale
Colliers Wood	A light-grey-bricked building with a blue sign reading "COLLIERS WOOD STATION" in white letters all under a blue sky with white clouds	Northern	Merton	3	13 Sep 1926				5.54	Colliers Wood
Covent Garden	A red-bricked building with a white sign reading "COVENT" in blue letters and a blue sign reading "UNDERGROUND" in white letters under a white sky	Piccadilly	City of Westminster	1	11 Apr 1907				13.52	Covent Garden
Croxley	A brown-bricked building with a blue sign reading "CROXLEY STATION" in white letters and three cars parked in front all under a blue sky with white clouds	Met.	Three Rivers	7	2 Nov 1925			Croxley Green: 1925–1949	0.90	Croxley Green
Dagenham East	A red-bricked building with a blue sign reading "DAGENHAM EAST STATION" in white letters, three people walking in front, and three cars parked outside	District	Barking and Dagenham	5	2 Jun 1902		1885	Dagenham: 1888–1949	2.70	Dagenham
Dagenham Heathway	A girl with a pink shirt and blue jeans on a railway platform with a railway track on the right and a white train on it with a red front	District	Barking and Dagenham	5	12 Sep 1932			Heathway: 1932–1949	4.92	Dagenham
Debden	Two people walking on a green bridge with a white lattice running over a railway track and platform under a blue sky with white clouds	Central	Epping Forest	6	25 Sep 1949		24 Apr 1865	Chigwell Road: 1865; Chigwell Lane: 1865–1949	1.98	Debden
Dollis Hill	People walking on a railway platform with a train on the right with white siding and red doors all under a blue sky with white clouds	Jubilee	Brent	3	1 Oct 1909				3.18	Dollis Hill
Ealing Broadway	A number of people standing and sitting in front of a grey building with a white sign reading "Ealing Broadway" all under a blue sky with white clouds	District; Central	Ealing	3	1 Jul 1879				17.08	Ealing
Ealing Common	A grey building with a blue sign reading "EALING COMMON STATION" in white letters and two green trees in the background all under a blue sky	District; Piccadilly	Ealing	3	1 Jul 1879			Ealing Common: 1879–1886; Ealing Common and West Acton: 1886–1910	1.93	Ealing
Earl's Court	The interior of a building with windows on the ceiling and a railway track running from the background to the foreground in the centre	District; Piccadilly	Kensington and Chelsea	1; 2	30 Oct 1871	1 Feb 1878			16.59	Earl's Court
East Acton	A red-bricked building with a blue sign reading "EAST ACTON STATION" in white letters and a man walking in front all under a white sky	Central	Hammersmith and Fulham	2	3 Aug 1920				3.69	Acton
East Finchley	A white building with brick sections spanning a railway track and resting on railway platforms on either side all under a blue sky with white clouds	Northern	Barnet	3	3 Jul 1939		22 Aug 1867		5.51	Finchley
East Ham	A red- and brown-bricked building with a blue sign reading "EAST HAM STATION" in white letters and people walking in front all under a white sky	District; H&C	Newham	3; 4	2 Jun 1902		1858		11.12	East Ham
East Putney	A red-bricked building with a blue sign reading "EAST PUTNEY STATION" in white letters and people standing in front all under a blue sky with white clouds	District	Wandsworth	2; 3	3 Jun 1889				6.11	Putney
Eastcote	A brown-bricked building with a blue sign reading "EASTCOTE STATION" in white letters and people walking in front all under a blue sky with white clouds	Met.; Piccadilly (Note: First served by Metropolitan line – District line service added in 1910 which was transferred to Piccadilly line in 1933.)	Hillingdon	5	26 May 1906				2.21	Eastcote
Edgware	A white bluilding with white columns upholding a brown-shingled roof with people walking and standing in front all under a blue sky	Northern	Barnet	5	18 Aug 1924				4.03	Edgware
Edgware Road	A red-bricked building with a white sign reading "EDGWARE ROAD STATION" in red letters with a car driving in the foreground	Bakerloo	City of Westminster	1	15 Jun 1907				3.72	Paddington
Edgware Road	A tan-coloured building with brown-framed windows and a sign reading "METROPOLITAN EDGWARE ROAD STATION RAILWAY" in brown letters	H&C; District; Circle	City of Westminster	1	10 Jan 1863				5.96	Paddington
Elephant & Castle	A light blue building with a dark blue sign reading "ELEPHANT & CASTLE STATION" in white letters all under a blue sky with white clouds	Northern; Bakerloo	Southwark	1; 2	18 Dec 1890				14.13	Elephant & Castle
Elm Park	A brown-bricked building with a blue sign reading "ELM PARK STATION" in white letters and people walking in front all under a blue sky	District	Havering	6	13 May 1935				2.64	Elm Park
Embankment	A grey building with a blue sign reading "EMBANKMENT STATION" in white letters and people standing in the foreground all under a white sky	District; Bakerloo; Northern; Circle	City of Westminster	1	30 May 1870			Charing Cross [District]: 1870–1915; Embankment [Bakerloo]: 1906–1914; Charing Cross (Embankment) [Bakerloo & Northern]: 1914–1915; Charing Cross: 1915–1974; Charing Cross Embankment: 1974–1976	17.97	Charing Cross
Epping	A brown-bricked building with a blue sign reading "EPPING STATION" in white letters and people in the foreground all under a blue sky with white clouds	Central	Epping Forest	6	25 Sep 1949		24 Apr 1865		3.40	Epping
Euston	A white building with black columns and a white sign reading "EUSTON STATION" in blue letters and a traffic pilon in the foreground all under a white sky	Northern; Victoria	Camden	1	22 Jun 1907			Melton Street: proposed before opening	33.19	Camden
Euston Square	A building covered in windows with a blue sign reading "EUSTON SQUARE STATION" in white letters all under a blue sky with white clouds	Met.; Circle; H&C	Camden	1	10 Jan 1863			Gower Street: 1863–1909	12.26	Camden
Fairlop	A brown-bricked building with a blue sign reading "FAIRLOP STATION" in white letters and a car parked in front all under a blue sky with white clouds	Central	Redbridge	4	31 May 1948		1 May 1903		0.96	Fairlop
Farringdon	A white building with a sign reading "FARRINGDON & HIGH HOLBORN STATION" in gold letters and people in front all under a blue sky with white clouds	Met.; Circle; H&C	Islington	1	10 Jan 1863	23 Dec 1865		Farringdon Street: 1863–1922; Farringdon & High Holborn: 1922–1936	41.26	Clerkenwell
Finchley Central	A white- and beige-bricked building with a blue sign reading "FINCHLEY CENTRAL STATION" in white letters all under a blue sky fading to purple on the horizon	Northern	Barnet	4	14 Apr 1940		22 Aug 1867	Finchley & Hendon: 1867–1872; Finchley: 1872–1896; Finchley (Church End): 1896–1940	5.18	Finchley
Finchley Road	A white building with a blue-shingled roof and a blue sign reading "FINCHLEY ROAD STATION" in white letters all under a blue sky with white clouds	Met.; Jubilee (Note: First served by Metropolitan line – Bakerloo line service added in 1939 which was transferred to the Jubilee line in 1979.)	Camden	2	30 Jun 1879				7.60	West Hampstead
Finsbury Park	A grey-panelled building with a blue sign reading "FINSBURY PARK" in white letters and a woman with a brown coat standing in the doorway	Piccadilly; Victoria	Islington	2	15 Dec 1906				21.22	Finsbury Park
Fulham Broadway	The interior of a building with white walls, white flooring, and a railway track running down the middle of the corridor with a train on it	District	Hammersmith and Fulham	2	1 Mar 1880			Walham Green: 1880–1952	6.89	Walham Green
Gants Hill	Two people sitting on brown benches and one person standing inside a building with a white, rounded ceiling, white-tiled floors, and three escalators	Central	Redbridge	4	14 Dec 1947			Ilford North: proposed before opening; Cranbrook: proposed before opening	4.88	Gants Hill
Gloucester Road	A beige-bricked building with a green sign reading "METROPOLITAN & DISTRICT RAILWAYS GLOUCESTER ROAD STATION" in white letters	District; Piccadilly; Circle	Kensington and Chelsea	1	1 Oct 1868			Brompton (Gloucester Road): 1868–1907	12.03	South Kensington
Golders Green	A red-bricked building with a blue sign reading "GOLDERS GREEN STATION" in white letters and people in front all under a blue sky with white clouds	Northern	Barnet	3	22 Jun 1907				6.24	Golders Green
Goldhawk Road	A brown-bricked building with a blue sign reading "GOLDHAWK ROAD STATION" in white letters and two women walking in front all under a grey sky	H&C (Note: First served by Metropolitan line – Hammersmith & City line services separately identified in 1990, Circle line service added in 2009.); Circle	Hammersmith and Fulham	2	1 Apr 1914				1.90	Shepherd's Bush
Goodge Street	A red-bricked building with a blue sign reading "GOODGE STREET STATION" in white letters and several people walking in front all under a blue sky	Northern	Camden	1	22 Jun 1907			Tottenham Court Road: 1907–1908	5.44	Fitzrovia
Grange Hill	A brown-bricked building with a blue sign reading "GRANGE HILL STATION" in white letters all under a blue sky with white clouds	Central	Epping Forest	4	21 Nov 1948		1 May 1903		0.35	Chigwell
Great Portland Street	A beige-bricked building with a blue sign reading "GREAT PORTLAND STREET STATION" in white letters all under a blue sky with white clouds	Met.; Circle; H&C	City of Westminster	1	10 Jan 1863			Portland Road: 1863–1917; Great Portland Street: 1917–1923; Great Portland Street & Regent's Park: 1923–1933	5.92	Fitzrovia
Greenford	A red-bricked building with a blue sign reading "GREENFORD STATION" in white letters and people in front all under a blue sky with white clouds	Central	Ealing	4	30 Jun 1947		1 Oct 1904		3.27	Greenford
Green Park	The interior of a building with a rounded, white roof, white walls, grey flooring, and a train on the right carrying passengers	Piccadilly; Victoria; Jubilee	City of Westminster	1	15 Dec 1906			Dover Street: 1906–1933	31.10	Westminster
Gunnersbury	A group of people standing on a railway platform with a railway track to the right and a white-and-red train running on it with its headlights on	District	Hounslow	3	1 Jun 1877		1 Jan 1869	Brentford Road: 1869–1871	3.85	Gunnersbury
Hainault	A red-bricked building with a blue sign reading "HAINAULT STATION" in white letters and a lamp post in front all under a blue sky with white clouds	Central	Redbridge	4	31 May 1948		1 May 1903		3.03	Hainault
Hammersmith	A beige building with a circular, red sign in the middle stating "Coca-Cola" in white letters and a rectangular, blue sign below	District; Piccadilly	Hammersmith and Fulham	2	9 Sep 1874				22.48	Hammersmith
Hammersmith	A brown-bricked building with a rectangular, blue sign reading "HAMMERSMITH STATION" in white letters all under a grey sky	H&C; Circle	Hammersmith and Fulham	2	13 Jun 1864	1 Dec 1868			9.92	Hammersmith
Hampstead	A red-bricked building with a rectangular, blue sign reading "HAMPSTEAD STATION" in white letters and people in front all under a white sky	Northern	Camden	2; 3	22 Jun 1907			Heath Street: proposed before opening	4.11	Hampstead
Hanger Lane	A white building with a rectangular, blue sign reading "HANGER LANE STATION" in white letters all under a blue sky with white clouds	Central	Ealing	3	30 Jun 1947				2.89	Hanger Hill
Harlesden	A railway platform with a railway track running from the bottom left corner to the middle right and the legs of several sitting people visible in the bottom right	Bakerloo	Brent	3	16 Apr 1917		15 Jun 1912		2.70	Harlesden
Harrow & Wealdstone	A red-bricked building with a rectangular, blue sign reading "HARROW & WEALDSTONE" in white letters all under a blue sky with white clouds	Bakerloo	Harrow	5	16 Apr 1917		20 Jul 1837	Harrow: 1837–1897	5.14	Wealdstone
Harrow-on-the-Hill	A red-bricked building with a rectangular, blue sign reading "Flexible Offices To Let 100 sq ft – 40,000 sq ft Meeting & Training Rooms"	Met.	Harrow	5	2 Aug 1880		15 Mar 1899	Harrow: 1880–1894	8.64	Harrow
Hatton Cross	A dark grey building with a dark blue sign reading "HATTON CROSS STATION" in white letters all under a blue sky with an aeroplane flying through it	Piccadilly	Hillingdon	5; 6	19 Jul 1975				3.27	Hatton
Heathrow Terminals 2 & 3	The interior of a building with people walking in various directions under a blue sign reading "HEATHROW TERMINALS 1, 2, 3 UNDERGROUND"	Piccadilly	Hillingdon	6	16 Dec 1977			Heathrow Central: 1976–1983; Heathrow Central Terminals 1, 2, 3: 1983–1986; Heathrow Terminals 1, 2, 3 (1986-2016)	6.04	Heathrow Airport
Heathrow Terminal 4	The dark interior of a building with a rectangular, blue sign reading "HEATHROW TERMINAL 4 STATION" in white letters and white flooring	Piccadilly	Hillingdon	6	12 Apr 1986				1.72 (Note: Heathrow Terminal 4 station was closed during the COVID national lockdown.)	Heathrow Airport
Heathrow Terminal 5	A dark grey doorway with a person walking through it and a white sign above with a red circle on it and letters reading "UNDERGROUND"	Piccadilly	Hillingdon	6	27 Mar 2008				4.10	Heathrow Airport
Hendon Central	A brown-bricked building with white columns and a sign reading "HENDON CENTRAL STATION" in blue letters all under a clear, blue sky	Northern	Barnet	3; 4	19 Nov 1923				7.33	Hendon
High Barnet	A beige-bricked building with a rectangular, blue sign reading "HIGH BARNET STATION" in white letters all under a blue sky with white clouds	Northern	Barnet	5	14 Apr 1940		1 Apr 1872		3.71	Chipping Barnet
Highbury & Islington	A red-bricked building with a rectangular, blue sign reading "HIGHBURY & ISLINGTON STATION" in white letters all under a blue sky with white clouds	Victoria	Islington	2	1 Sep 1968		28 Jun 1904	Highbury: 1867–1922	15.05	Highbury
Highgate	A brown-bricked building with a rectangular, blue sign reading "HIGHGATE STATION" in white letters and a person walking in all under a white sky	Northern	Haringey	3	19 Jan 1941		22 Aug 1867		4.64	Highgate
High Street Kensington	A white many-windowed building and several people walking in front all under a white sky	District; Circle	Kensington and Chelsea	1	1 Oct 1868			Kensington: proposed before opening	10.20	Kensington
Hillingdon	A white building.	Met.; Piccadilly	Hillingdon	6	10 Dec 1923	6 Dec 1992		Hillingdon: 1923–1934; Hillingdon (Swakeleys): 1934, suffix gradually dropped	1.44	Hillingdon
Holborn	The interior of a building with a rounded ceiling and walls and a white sign hanging from the ceiling reading "Way out Central line"	Central; Piccadilly	Camden	1	15 Dec 1906			Holborn: 1906–1933; Holborn (Kingsway): 1933, suffix gradually dropped	20.84	Holborn
Holland Park	An orange building with an illuminated, blue sign reading "HOLLAND PARK STATION" in white letters and people walking in front all under a white sky	Central	Kensington and Chelsea	2	30 Jul 1900			Lansdown Road: proposed before opening	2.95	Holland Park
Holloway Road	A red-bricked building with a sign reading "EXIT HOLLOWAY ROAD" in gold letters and a rectangular, blue sign reading "HOLLOWAY ROAD STATION"	Piccadilly	Islington	2	15 Dec 1906			Holloway: proposed before opening	5.27	Holloway
Hornchurch	A railway track separating two railway platforms with yellow lines painted on them running parallel to the track all under a light blue sky with white clouds	District	Havering	6	2 Jun 1902		1 May 1885		1.65	Hornchurch
Hounslow Central	A brown-bricked building with a rectangular, blue sign reading "HOUNSLOW CENTRAL STATION" in white letters and a light post in front all under a white sky	Piccadilly	Hounslow	4	1 Apr 1886			Heston Hounslow: 1886–1925	3.24	Hounslow
Hounslow East	A dark grey building with a green roof and a rectangular, blue sign reading "HOUNSLOW EAST STATION" in white letters all under a blue sky	Piccadilly	Hounslow	4	2 May 1909			Hounslow Town: 1909–1925	3.46	Hounslow
Hounslow West	A light grey building with a long, rectangular, dark blue sign reading "HOUNSLOW WEST STATION" in white letters all under a cloudy sky	Piccadilly	Hounslow	5	21 Jul 1884			Hounslow Barracks: 1884–1925	2.93	Hounslow
Hyde Park Corner	The interior of a building with a rounded ceiling and rounded walls with a railway track on the left and people standing on the right	Piccadilly	City of Westminster	1	15 Dec 1906				3.61	Knightsbridge
Ickenham	A brown-bricked building with a rectangular, dark blue sign reading "ICKENHAM STATION" in white letters all under a light blue sky	Met.; Piccadilly	Hillingdon	6	25 Sep 1905				0.87	Ickenham
Kennington	A red-bricked building with a rectangular, dark blue sign reading "KENNINGTON STATION" in white letters all under a light blue sky	Northern	Southwark	1; 2	18 Dec 1890			New Street: proposed before opening	4.93	Kennington
Kensal Green	A brown-bricked building with a black sign reading "Kensal Green" in white letters and some people walking in front all under a white sky	Bakerloo	Brent	2	1 Oct 1916				1.98	Kensal Green
Kensington (Olympia)	A beige building with a rectangular, white sign reading "Welcome to Kensington Olympia" in dark blue letters all under a light blue sky	District	Kensington and Chelsea	2	1 Jul 1864		27 May 1844	Kensington: 1844–1868; Kensington (Addison Road): 1868–1946	0.00	Kensington
Kentish Town	A red-bricked building with a rectangular, white sign reading "KENTISH TOWN STATION" in black letters all under a light blue sky	Northern	Camden	2	22 Jun 1907				0.00	Kentish Town
Kenton	A red-bricked building with a rectangular, dark blue sign reading "KENTON STATION" in white letters all under a blue sky with white clouds	Bakerloo	Brent	4	16 Apr 1917		15 Jun 1912		1.73	Kenton
Kew Gardens	A beige-bricked building with five rounded stairs leading up to its entrance and green trees and bushes in front all under a white sky	District	Richmond	3; 4	1 Jun 1877		1 Jul 1869		3.08	Kew
Kilburn	A man with a white shirt and white pants sitting on a brown bench facing the left with another bench behind him all under a light blue sky with white clouds	Jubilee	Brent	2	24 Nov 1879			Kilburn and Brondesbury: 1879–1950	5.55	Kilburn
Kilburn Park	A red-bricked building with a series of white signs together reading "KILBURN PARK STATION" in red letters and people walking in front all under a white sky	Bakerloo	Brent	2	31 Jan 1915				2.74	Kilburn
Kingsbury	A brown-bricked building with a rectangular, dark blue sign reading "KINGSBURY STATION" in white letters all under a light blue sky	Jubilee	Brent	4	10 Dec 1932				3.95	Kingsbury
King's Cross St Pancras	A red-bricked building with a dark blue sign reading "KING'S CROSS ST. PANCRAS" in white letters and several entranceways all under a grey sky	Met.; Northern; Piccadilly; Circle; Victoria; H&C	Camden	1	10 Jan 1863	9 Mar 1941 (Met.)		King's Cross [Metropolitan]: 1863–1925; King's Cross & St. Pancras [Metropolitan]: 1925–1933; King's Cross [Piccadilly]: 1906–1927; King's Cross for St. Pancras [Piccadilly]: 1927–1933; King's Cross for St. Pancras [Northern]: 1907–1933	77.13	King's Cross
Knightsbridge	A white building with a rectangular, dark blue sign reading "KNIGHTSBRIDGE STATION" in white letters all under a light blue sky with white clouds	Piccadilly	Kensington and Chelsea	1	15 Dec 1906			Sloane Street: proposed before opening	14.26	Knightsbridge
Ladbroke Grove	A brown-bricked building bordered in red bricks with a blue, rectangular sign reading "LADBROKE GROVE STATION" in white letters all under a blue sky	H&C; Circle	Kensington and Chelsea	2	13 Jun 1864			Notting Hill: 1864–1880; Notting Hill & Ladbroke Grove: 1880–1919; Ladbroke Grove (North Kensington): 1919–1938	6.13	Ladbroke Grove
Lambeth North	A red-bricked building with a dark blue, rectangular sign reading "LAMBETH NORTH STATION" in white letters all under a light blue sky	Bakerloo	Lambeth	1	10 Mar 1906			Kennington Road (1906); Westminster Bridge Road: 1906–1917	2.73	Lambeth
Lancaster Gate	A grey building with blue panels and a dark blue, rectangular sign reading "LANCASTER GATE STATION" in white letters and people in front	Central	City of Westminster	1	30 Jul 1900			Westbourne: proposed before opening	3.09	Paddington
Latimer Road	A beige-bricked building with a dark-blue, rectangular sign reading "LATIMER ROAD STATION" in white letters all under a white sky	H&C; Circle	Kensington and Chelsea	2	16 Dec 1868				3.09	North Kensington
Leicester Square	A grey-bricked building with a dark blue, rectangular sign reading "LEICESTER SQUARE STATION" in white letters all under a bright sky	Piccadilly; Northern	City of Westminster	1	15 Dec 1906			Cranbourn Street: proposed before opening	27.56	West End
Leyton	A white-bricked building with a dark blue, rectangular sign reading "LEYTON STATION" in white letters all under a blue sky fading to purple on the horizon	Central	Waltham Forest	3	5 May 1947		22 Aug 1856	Low Leyton: 1856–1868	8.95	Leyton
Leytonstone	A white-tiled building with a dark blue, rectangular sign reading "LEYTONSTONE STATION PUBLIC SUBWAY LEYTONSTONE STATION" in white letters	Central	Waltham Forest	3; 4	5 May 1947		22 Aug 1856		7.15	Leytonstone
Liverpool Street	A white building with a dark blue, rectangular sign reading "LIVERPOOL STREET UNDERGROUND STATION" in white letters all under a white sky	Met.; Central; Circle; H&C	City of London	1	1 Feb 1875	12 Jul 1875		Bishopsgate: 1875–1909	61.20	Bishopsgate
London Bridge	A single storey stone and glass building with "London Bridge Station" incised into the stonework above the entrance	Northern; Jubilee	Southwark	1	25 Feb 1900				57.89	Southwark
Loughton	A beige-bricked building with a dark blue, rectangular sign reading "LOUGHTON STATION" in white letters all under a blue sky with white clouds	Central	Epping Forest	6	21 Nov 1948		22 Aug 1856		2.79	Loughton
Maida Vale	A red-bricked building with a rectangular, white sign reading "ENTRANCE" in black letters and a rectangular, blue sign reading "MAIDA VALE STATION"	Bakerloo	City of Westminster	2	6 Jun 1915			Elgin Avenue: proposed before opening	2.87	Maida Vale
Manor House	A red-bricked building with a rectangular, dark blue sign reading "MANOR HOUSE STATION" in white letters all under a light blue sky with white clouds	Piccadilly	Hackney; Haringey	2; 3	19 Sep 1932				6.00	Manor House
Mansion House	A beige-bricked building with a rectangular, dark blue sign reading "MANSION HOUSE STATION" in white letters and a yellow sign reading "OFFICES TO LET"	District; Circle	City of London	1	3 Jul 1871				4.50	Castle Baynard
Marble Arch	The interior of a building with rounded ceiling and walls, red benches along the left wall, advertisements along the right wall, and a yellow line on the floor	Central	City of Westminster	1	30 Jul 1900				9.20	Marylebone
Marylebone	A red-bricked building with a sign reading "MARYLEBONE STATION" in beige letters, a blue roof, and a crowd of people in front	Bakerloo	City of Westminster	1	27 Mar 1907			Great Central: 1907–1917	8.86	Marylebone
Mile End	A grey-bricked building with a rectangular, dark blue sign reading "MILE END STATION" in white letters all under a light blue sky with white clouds	District; H&C; Central	Tower Hamlets	2	2 Jun 1902				11.28	Mile End
Mill Hill East	A beige-bricked building with a rectangular, dark blue sign reading "MILL HILL STATION" in white letters all under a blue sky with white clouds	Northern	Barnet	4	18 May 1941		22 Aug 1867	Mill Hill: 1867–1928; Bittacy Hill: proposed 1940	1.62	Mill Hill
Monument	The interior of a building with a railway track running between white-tiled pillars upholding a white-and-black ceiling lit by electrical lights	District; Circle	City of London	1	6 Oct 1884			King William Street: proposed before opening; East Cheap: 1884	40.07	City of London
Moorgate	A grey building with a rectangular, dark blue sign reading "MOORGATE STATION" in white letters and short, black, white-tipped posts in front	Met.; Northern; Circle; H&C	City of London	1	23 Dec 1865			Moorgate Street [Metropolitan]: 1865–1924	26.93	Moorgate
Moor Park	A red-bricked building with a rectangular, dark blue sign reading "MOOR PARK" in white letters and four black-striped posts in front	Met.	Three Rivers	6; 7	9 May 1910			Sandy Lodge: 1910–1923; Moor Park & Sandy Lodge: 1923–1950	0.83	Moor Park
Morden	A grey building with a rectangular, dark blue sign reading "MORDEN STATION" in white letters, two red buses in front, and a fence in the foreground	Northern	Merton	4	13 Sep 1926			North Morden: proposed before opening	8.70	Morden
Mornington Crescent	A red-bricked building with a rectangular, white sign reading "MORNINGTON CRESCENT STATION" in black letters all under a light blue sky	Northern	Camden	2	22 Jun 1907			Seymour Street: proposed before opening	2.96	Camden Town
Neasden	A brown-bricked building with a rectangular, dark blue sign reading "NEASDEN STATION" in white letters all under a light blue sky with white clouds	Jubilee	Brent	3	2 Aug 1880			Kingsbury & Neasden: 1880–1910; Neasden & Kingsbury: 1910–1932	2.64	Neasden
Newbury Park	A grey, cylindrical structure with a green roof and a large number of people walking through it with trees in the background all under a blue sky	Central	Redbridge	4	14 Dec 1947		1 May 1903		3.31	Newbury Park
Nine Elms	A low grey building with a projecting canopy stands in front of tall residential buildings	Northern	Wandsworth	1	20 Sep 2021				4.11	Nine Elms
North Acton	A red-bricked building with a rectangular, dark blue sign reading "NORTH ACTON STATION" in white letters all under a white sky	Central	Ealing	2; 3	5 Nov 1923				6.11	Acton
North Ealing	A speckled building with a rectangular, dark blue sign reading "NORTH EALING STATION" in white letters all under a blue sky with white clouds	Piccadilly	Ealing	3	23 Jun 1903				0.62	Ealing
North Greenwich	A grey building with grey lampposts in front and a green tree in the foreground all under a light blue sky with billowy, white clouds	Jubilee	Greenwich	2; 3	14 May 1999				23.73	Greenwich Peninsula
North Harrow	A beige building with a rectangular, dark blue sign reading "NORTH HARROW STATION" in white letters all under a light blue sky with white clouds	Met.	Harrow	5	22 Mar 1915				1.48	Harrow
North Wembley	People walking on a wet railway platform with grey lampposts on either side of a railway track on which a red train is running all under a blue sky	Bakerloo	Brent	4	16 Apr 1917		15 Jun 1912		1.39	North Wembley
Northfields	A red-bricked building with a rectangular, dark blue sign reading "NORTHFIELDS STATION" in white letters all under a light blue sky	Piccadilly	Ealing	3	16 Apr 1908	19 May 1932		Northfield Halt: 1908–1911; Northfields & Little Ealing: 1911–1932	2.58	Northfields
Northolt	A man with black hair, a black shirt, black pants, and black shoes reading a newspaper and sitting on a brown bench on a grey railway platform	Central	Ealing	5	21 Nov 1948				4.28	Northolt
Northwick Park	A brown-bricked building with a rectangular, dark blue sign reading "NORTHWICK PARK STATION" in white letters all under a light blue sky	Met.	Brent	4	28 Jun 1923			Northwick Park & Kenton: 1923–1933	3.22	Kenton
Northwood	A grey-tiled railway platform bordered by red-bricked walls supporting overhanging roofs from which elongated electrical lights hang	Met.	Hillingdon	6	1 Sep 1887				2.19	Northwood
Northwood Hills	A brown-bricked building with a rectangular, dark blue sign reading "NORTHWOOD HILLS STATION" in white letters all under a blue sky with white clouds	Met.	Hillingdon	6	13 Nov 1933				1.40	Northwood
Notting Hill Gate	The interior of a building with a rounded ceiling from which ten round electrical lights are suspended, three lit and seven unlit	District; Central; Circle	Kensington and Chelsea	1; 2	1 Oct 1868				12.83	Notting Hill
Oakwood	A brown-bricked building with a rectangular, black sign reading "OAKWOOD STATION" in white letters all under a light blue sky	Piccadilly	Enfield	5	13 Mar 1933			Enfield West: 1933–1934; Enfield West (Oakwood): 1934–1946	2.31	Oakwood
Old Street	A white sign with a red circle on it and a blue rectangle on which is written "UNDERGROUND" in white letters all under a grey sky	Northern	Islington; Hackney	1	17 Nov 1901				16.54	St Luke's
Osterley	A brown-bricked building with a rectangular, dark blue sign reading "OSTERLEY STATION" in white letters all under a dark sky with white clouds	Piccadilly	Hounslow	4	1 May 1883	25 Mar 1934		Osterley & Spring Grove: 1883–1934	1.71	Osterley
Oval	A grey-tiled building with a rectangular, dark blue sign reading "OVAL STATION" in white letters with people walking in front all under a clear, white sky	Northern	Lambeth	2	18 Dec 1890			Kennington Oval: proposed before opening; The Oval: 1890–1894	5.41	Oval
Oxford Circus	A red-bricked building with a sign reading "OXFORD CIRCUS HOUSE" in gold letters and a large number of people walking in the foreground	Central; Bakerloo; Victoria	City of Westminster	1	30 Jul 1900				53.18	West End
Paddington	A white building with signs reading "METROPOLITAN RAILWAY" and "PADDINGTON STATION" in large lettering cast into the stonework above the entrance	District; Circle; Bakerloo	City of Westminster	1	1 Oct 1868			Paddington (Praed Street) [ Circle]: 1868–1947	56.37 (Note: The two Paddington stations operate as a combined station with shared usage statistics.)	Paddington
Paddington	A large two-storey entrance with glazed facade. A sign reading "PADDINGTON STATION" is etched into the glass	H&C; Circle	City of Westminster	1	10 Jan 1863			Paddington (Bishop's Road): 1863–1933	56.37	Paddington
Park Royal	A brown-bricked building with a white sign reading "ZACHARIA FASHIONS WHOLESALERS" in blue letters all under a blue sky with white clouds	Piccadilly	Ealing	3	23 Jun 1903	6 Jul 1931		Park Royal & Tywford Abbey: 1903–1931; Park Royal: 1931–1936; Park Royal (Hanger Hill): 1936–1947	1.72	Park Royal
Parsons Green	A beige-bricked building with a rectangular, dark blue sign reading "PARSONS GREEN" in white letters all under a light blue sky with white clouds	District	Hammersmith and Fulham	2	1 Mar 1880				5.80	Parsons Green
Perivale	A red-bricked building with a rectangular, dark blue sign reading "PERIVALE STATION" in white letters all under a light blue sky	Central	Ealing	4	30 Jun 1947		2 May 1904	Perivale Halt: 1904–1947	1.76	Perivale
Piccadilly Circus	A red train running on a railway track through the interior of a building that has a rounded ceiling and rounded walls covered in advertisements	Bakerloo; Piccadilly	City of Westminster	1	10 Mar 1906				28.49	West End
Pimlico	A brown-bricked building with a rectangular, dark blue sign reading "PIMLICO STATION" in white letters and a black sign reading "UNDERGROUND"	Victoria	City of Westminster	1	14 Sep 1972				7.66	Pimlico
Pinner	A brown-bricked building with a rectangular, dark blue sign reading "PINNER" in front of a road all under a cloudless, light blue sky	Met.	Harrow	5	25 May 1885				2.53	Pinner
Plaistow	A railway platform with various people walking in different directions on it and a black sign reading "Way out" in yellow letters	District; H&C	Newham	3	2 Jun 1902		31 Mar 1858		4.66	Plaistow
Preston Road	A red-bricked building with a rectangular, dark blue sign reading "PRESTON ROAD STATION" in white letters all under a clear, white sky	Met.	Brent	4	21 May 1908	3 Jan 1932			2.52	Preston
Putney Bridge	A beige-bricked building with a rectangular, dark blue sign reading "PUTNEY BRIDGE STATION" in white letters all under a light blue sky	District	Hammersmith and Fulham	2	1 Mar 1880			Putney Bridge & Fulham: 1880–1902; Putney Bridge & Hurlingham: 1902–1932	4.94	Fulham
Queen's Park	A brown-bricked building with a white sign reading "Queen's Park" in blue letters underscored by a green line and a blue line	Bakerloo	Brent	2	11 Feb 1915		2 Jun 1879	Queen's Park (West Kilburn): 1879–1915	4.74	Queen's Park
Queensbury	A brown-bricked building with a rectangular, dark blue sign reading "QUEENSBURY STATION" in white letters all under a light blue sky	Jubilee	Brent	4	16 Dec 1934				3.15	Queensbury
Queensway	A gold-coloured building with a rectangular, dark blue sign reading "QUEENSWAY STATION" in white letters and people walking in front	Central	City of Westminster	1	30 Jul 1900			Queen's Road: 1900–1946	6.01	Bayswater
Ravenscourt Park	A brown-bricked building with a rectangular, dark blue sign reading "RANVENSCOURT PARK STATION" in white letters all under a blue sky	District	Hammersmith and Fulham	2	1 Jun 1877		1 Jan 1873	Shaftesbury Road: 1877–1888	2.73	Hammersmith
Rayners Lane	A brown-bricked building with a rectangular, dark blue sign reading "RAYNERS LANE STATION" in white letters all under a dark blue sky	Met. Piccadilly	Harrow	5	26 May 1906				3.39	Rayners Lane
Redbridge	A red-bricked building with a rectangular, dark blue sign reading "REDBRIDGE STATION" in white letters all under a dark blue sky with white clouds	Central	Redbridge	4	14 Dec 1947			Ilford West: proposed before opening; Red House: proposed before opening	2.06	Redbridge
Regent's Park	A white sign reading "REGENT'S PARK STATION BAKERLOO LINE" in black letters with people walking behind it all under a light blue sky	Bakerloo	City of Westminster	1	10 Mar 1906				2.31	Marylebone
Richmond	A grey building with a rectangular, white sign reading "Richmond" in dark blue letters all under a light blue sky with white clouds	District	Richmond	4	1 Jun 1877		1 Jan 1869		11.97	Richmond
Rickmansworth	A brown-bricked building with three brown-bricked chimneys, some scaffolding on the side, and seven vehicles in the parking lot in front	Met.	Three Rivers	7	1 Sep 1887				1.88	Rickmansworth
Roding Valley	A railway platform with a railway track running through it being used by a red-and-white train with its two headlights illuminated	Central	Epping Forest; Redbridge	4	21 Nov 1948		3 Feb 1936		0.17	Buckhurst Hill
Royal Oak	A brown-bricked building with a rectangular, dark blue sign reading "ROYAL OAK STATION" in white letters all under a light blue sky	H&C; Circle	City of Westminster	2	30 Oct 1871		4 Jun 1838		2.23	Westbourne
Ruislip	A brown-bricked building with a rectangular, dark blue sign reading "RUISLIP STATION" in white letters all under a clear, white sky	Met. Piccadilly	Hillingdon	6	4 Jul 1904				1.49	Ruislip
Ruislip Gardens	A grey building with a rectangular, dark blue sign reading "RUISLIP GARDENS STATION" in white letters all under a light blue sky with white clouds	Central	Hillingdon	5	29 Nov 1948		9 Jul 1934		0.86	Ruislip
Ruislip Manor	A brown-bricked building with a rectangular, dark blue sign reading "RUISLIP MANOR STATION" in white letters all under a light blue sky	Met. Piccadilly	Hillingdon	6	5 Aug 1912				1.42	Ruislip
Russell Square	A red-bricked building with a rectangular, dark blue sign reading "RUSSELL SQUARE STATION" in white letters all under a white sky	Piccadilly	Camden	1	15 Dec 1906				8.94	Bloomsbury
St James's Park	A dirty, white-bricked building with three flagpoles on top of it and several lampposts in front of it all under a light blue sky with white clouds	District; Circle	City of Westminster	1	24 Dec 1868				10.57	St James's
St John's Wood	A brown-bricked building with a rectangular, dark blue sign reading "ST. JOHN'S WOOD STATION" in white letters all under a light blue sky	Jubilee (Note: First served by Bakerloo line – service transferred to Jubilee line in 1979.)	City of Westminster	2	20 Nov 1939			Acacia Road: proposed before opening	6.17	St John's Wood
St Paul's	The interior of a building with a rounded ceiling and rounded walls covered in peeling advertisements, peeling black paint, and white tiles	Central	City of London	1	30 Jul 1900			Newgate Street: proposed before opening; Post Office: 1900–1937	9.42	Smithfield
Seven Sisters	The interior of a building with a rounded ceiling and a white sign on the right wall reading "SEVEN SISTERS" in dark blue letters under a line	Victoria	Haringey	3	1 Sep 1968				12.71	Seven Sisters
Shepherd's Bush	A grey-tiled building with a rectangular, dark blue sign reading "SHEPHERD'S BUSH" in white letters all under a light blue sky	Central	Hammersmith and Fulham	2	30 Jul 1900				13.25	Shepherd's Bush
Shepherd's Bush Market	A series of white satellite dishes on the roofs of buildings with a railway track in the foreground all under a light blue sky with white clouds	H&C; Circle	Hammersmith and Fulham	2	13 Jun 1864	1 Apr 1914		Shepherd's Bush: 1864–2008	3.40	Shepherd's Bush
Sloane Square	Eight people walking towards an escalator on a railway platform next to a green-tiled wall on the left and a railway track on the right	District; Circle	Kensington and Chelsea	1	24 Dec 1868				14.24	Chelsea
Snaresbrook	A red-bricked building with a rectangular, dark blue sign reading "SNARESBROOK STATION" in white letters all under a light blue sky	Central	Redbridge	4	14 Dec 1947		22 Aug 1856	Snaresbrook & Wanstead: 1856–1947	1.89	Snaresbrook
South Ealing	A brown-bricked building with a rectangular, dark blue sign reading "SOUTH EALING STATION" in white letters all under a light blue sky	Piccadilly	Ealing	3	1 May 1883				2.24	Ealing
South Harrow	A railway platform with grey, illuminated lampposts on either side of the railway track all under a light blue sky with white-and-grey clouds	Piccadilly	Harrow	5	28 Jun 1903	5 Jul 1935			2.08	Harrow
South Kensington	A white building with a rectangular, dark blue sign reading "SOUTH KENSINGTON STATION" in white letters all under a white sky	District; Piccadilly; Circle	Kensington and Chelsea	1	24 Dec 1868				29.48	South Kensington
South Kenton	A rectangular, dark blue sign reading "SOUTH KENTON" in white letters next to a grey lamppost all under a light blue sky with white clouds	Bakerloo	Brent	4	3 Jul 1933				0.99	Kenton
South Ruislip	A white building with a rectangular, dark blue sign reading "SOUTH RUISLIP STATION" in white letters all under a light blue sky	Central	Hillingdon	5	23 Nov 1948		1 May 1908	Northolt Junction: 1908–1932; South Ruislip & Northolt Junction: 1932–1947	1.62	South Ruislip
South Wimbledon	A grey building with a rectangular, dark blue sign reading "SOUTH WIMBLEDON STATION" in white letters all under a light blue sky	Northern	Merton	3; 4	13 Sep 1926			Merton Grove: proposed before opening; South Wimbledon: 1926–1928; South Wimbledon (Merton): 1928, suffix gradually dropped	3.80	Wimbledon
South Woodford	A brown-bricked building with a rectangular, dark blue sign reading "SOUTH WOODFORD STATION" in white letters all surrounded by snowflakes	Central	Redbridge	4	14 Dec 1947		22 Aug 1856	George Lane: 1856–1937; South Woodford (George Lane): 1937–1950	4.15	South Woodford
Southfields	A red-bricked building with a rectangular, dark blue sign reading "SOUTHFIELDS STATION" in white letters all under a blue sky	District	Wandsworth	3	3 Jun 1889				5.14	Southfields
Southgate	A grey building with a rectangular, dark blue sign reading "SOUTHGATE STATION" in white letters all under a light blue sky with white clouds	Piccadilly	Enfield	4	13 Mar 1933			Chase Side: proposed before opening	4.08	Southgate
Southwark	A grey building with a rectangular, dark blue sign reading "SOUTHWARK STATION" in white letters all under a light blue sky with white clouds	Jubilee	Southwark	1	20 Nov 1999				9.10	Bankside
Stamford Brook	A grey railway platform with a railway track running down the middle and a rectangular, red sign reading "WHISTLE" in white letters	District	Hammersmith and Fulham	2	1 Feb 1912				2.27	Chiswick
Stanmore	A brown-bricked building with four brown-bricked chimneys and a rectangular, dark blue sign reading "STANMORE STATION" in white letters	Jubilee	Harrow	5	10 Dec 1932				3.25	Stanmore
Stepney Green	A red-bricked building with a rectangular, dark blue sign reading "STEPNEY GREEN STATION" in white letters and a man walking in front	District; H&C	Tower Hamlets	2	23 Jun 1902				5.45	Stepney
Stockwell	A brown-bricked building with a rectangular, light blue sign reading "STOCKWELL STATION" in white letters all under a light blue sky	Northern; Victoria	Lambeth	2	18 Dec 1890				7.60	Stockwell
Stonebridge Park	A red-bricked building with three people in front of it and two bicycles leaning against a red-bricked wall to the right side all under a blue sky	Bakerloo	Brent	3	16 Apr 1917		15 Jun 1912		2.49	Tokyngton
Stratford	A grey building with a series of large, clear windows reading "Back the Bid LONDON 2012 CANDIDATE CITY" in white letters all under a blue sky	Central; Jubilee	Newham	2; 3	4 Dec 1946		1839		55.72	Stratford
Sudbury Hill	A red-bricked building with a rectangular, grey sign reading "SUDBURY HILL STATION" in black letters all und er a blue sky with white clouds	Piccadilly	Harrow	4	28 Jun 1903				1.70	Sudbury
Sudbury Town	A red-bricked building with a rectangular, grey sign reading "SUDBURY TOWN STATION" in black letters all under a blue sky	Piccadilly	Brent; Ealing	4	28 Jun 1903				1.67	Sudbury
Swiss Cottage	Two black-bricked pillars on a sidewalk with a rectangular, dark blue sign connecting them reading "SWISS COTTAGE STATION" in white letters	Jubilee	Camden	2	20 Nov 1939				5.62	Swiss Cottage
Temple	A grey building with a rectangular, white sign on a rounded corner reading "TEMPLE STATION" in black letters all under a blue sky	District; Circle	City of Westminster	1	30 May 1870				8.25	Temple
Theydon Bois	A brown-bricked building with a rectangular, dark blue sign reading "THEYDON BOIS STATION" in white letters all under a blue sky with white clouds	Central	Epping Forest	6	25 Sep 1949		24 Apr 1865	Theydon: 1865	0.74	Theydon Bois
Tooting Bec	A grey-bricked building with a rectangular, dark blue sign reading "TOOTING BEC STATION" in white letters all under a blue sky with white clouds	Northern	Wandsworth	3	13 Sep 1926			Trinity Road (Tooting Bec): 1926–1950	6.52	Tooting
Tooting Broadway	A grey-bricked building with a rectangular, dark blue sign reading "TOOTING BROADWAY STATION" in white letters all under a grey sky	Northern	Wandsworth	3	13 Sep 1926				12.71	Tooting
Tottenham Court Road	The interior of a building with a rounded, white ceiling and rounded walls, the left one black and the right one green, on either side of a man	Central; Northern	Camden	1	30 Jul 1900			Oxford Street [Northern]: 1907–1908	62.06	St Giles
Tottenham Hale	A white rectangular box of a building with a glazed screen bearing the National Rail and London Underground symbols and a blue band with the words "TOTTENHAM HALE STATION" above the wide entrance	Victoria	Haringey	3	1 Sep 1968				13.85	Tottenham Hale
Totteridge & Whetstone	A beige-bricked building with a rectangular, dark blue sign reading "TOTTERIDGE & WHETSTONE STATION" in white letters all under a blue sky	Northern	Barnet	4	14 Apr 1940		1 Apr 1872	Totteridge: 1872–1874	2.04	Whetstone
Tower Hill	A grey, many-windowed castle with flags flying from its turrets in the background, several people walking in the foreground, and a bright sky above	District; Circle	Tower Hamlets	1	25 Sep 1882	12 Oct 1884; 5 Feb 1967		Tower of London: 1882–1884; Mark Lane: 1884–1946	16.40	Tower Hill
Tufnell Park	A red-bricked building with a rectangular, dark blue sign reading "TUFNELL PARK STATION" in white letters all under a blue sky with white clouds	Northern	Islington	2	22 Jun 1907				4.91	Tufnell Park
Turnham Green	A grey railway station with railway tracks on either side of it, four blue lampposts protruding from the middle of it, and a blue sky above	District; Piccadilly	Hounslow	2; 3	1 Jun 1877		1 Jan 1869		5.03	Chiswick
Turnpike Lane	A brown-bricked building with a rectangular, dark blue sign reading "TURNPIKE LANE STATION" in white letters all under a blue sky	Piccadilly	Haringey	3	19 Sep 1932			Harringay: proposed before opening; Ducketts Green: proposed before opening	8.17	Noel Park
Upminster	A brown-bricked building with a rectangular, dark blue sign reading "Upminster" in white letters and a pink sign reading "c2c"	District	Havering	6	2 Jun 1902		1 May 1885		4.68	Upminster
Upminster Bridge	A red-bricked building with a rectangular, dark blue sign reading "UPMINSTER BRIDGE STATION" in white letters all under a blue sky	District	Havering	6	17 Dec 1934				0.74	Upminster Bridge
Upney	A brown-bricked building with a rectangular, dark blue sign reading "UPNEY STATION" in white letters all under a light blue sky with white clouds	District	Barking and Dagenham	4	12 Sep 1932				2.27	Barking
Upton Park	A red-and-brown bricked building with a rectangular, dark blue sign reading "UPTON PARK STATION" in white letters all under a light blue sky	District; H&C	Newham	3	2 Jun 1902		1877		11.75	Upton Park
Uxbridge	A brown-bricked building with a rectangular, light blue sign reading "METROPOLITAN & PICCADILLY LINES" in white letters all under a blue sky	Met. Piccadilly	Hillingdon	6	4 Jul 1904	4 Dec 1938			5.43	Uxbridge
Vauxhall	A white building with a rectangular, white sign reading "Vauxhall" in black letters and four bicycles in front all under a grey sky	Victoria	Lambeth	1; 2	23 Jul 1971				22.14	Vauxhall
Victoria	A grey building with three rectangular, white signs reading "London Victoria Station" in black letters all under a clear, white sky	District; Circle; Victoria	City of Westminster	1	24 Dec 1868				62.69	Belgravia
Walthamstow Central	The interior of a building with a rounded ceiling, rounded walls, and a man wearing an orange jacket walking towards the back wall	Victoria	Waltham Forest	3	1 Sep 1968				13.44	Walthamstow
Wanstead	A grey building with a sign on it depicting a blue rectangle superimposed on a white circle superimposed on a red circle	Central	Redbridge	4	14 Dec 1947				1.98	Wanstead
Warren Street	A brown-bricked building with a rectangular, dark blue sign reading "WARREN STREET STATION" in white letters and people in front	Northern; Victoria	Camden	1	22 Jun 1907			Euston Road: 1907–1908	14.78	Fitzrovia
Warwick Avenue	A green sign with the words "WARWICK AVENUE STATION" written in white letters on a dark blue rectangle all under a light blue sky with white clouds	Bakerloo	City of Westminster	2	31 Jan 1915			Warrington Crescent: proposed before opening	3.13	Little Venice
Waterloo	The interior of a building with a rounded, white ceiling, rounded, white-bricked walls, and a crowd of people walking towards the back wall	W&C; Bakerloo; Northern; Jubilee	Lambeth	1	10 Mar 1906				77.39	Waterloo
Watford	A brown-bricked building with a red-tiled roof and a rectangular, dark blue sign reading "WATFORD STATION" in white letters all under a white sky	Met.	Watford	7	2 Nov 1925				1.70	Cassiobury
Wembley Central	Several people walking inside a building with a black ceiling and white walls bordered in black and displaying several advertisements	Bakerloo	Brent	4	16 Apr 1917		1842	Sudbury: 1842–1882; Sudbury & Wembley: 1882–1910; Wembley for Sudbury: 1910–1948	4.94	Wembley
Wembley Park	A terracotta-coloured building with a rectangular, light blue sign reading "WEMBLEY PARK STATION" in white letters all under a cloudy sky	Met. Jubilee	Brent	4	12 May 1894				16.53	Wembley Park
West Acton	A red-bricked building with a rectangular, dark blue sign reading "WEST ACTON STATION" in white letters all under a blue sky with white clouds	Central	Ealing	3	5 Nov 1923				1.11	Acton
West Brompton	A beige-bricked building with a rectangular, dark blue sign reading "WEST BROMPTON STATION" in white letters all under a light blue sky	District	Kensington and Chelsea	2	12 Apr 1869			Richmond Road: proposed before opening	5.08	West Brompton
West Finchley	A red-bricked building with a rectangular, dark blue sign reading "WEST FINCHLEY STATION" in white letters all under a light blue sky	Northern	Barnet	4	14 Apr 1940		1 Mar 1933		1.37	Finchley
West Ham	A brown-bricked building with a large, grey sign reading "WEST HAM" in white letters and four people in front all under a light grey sky	District; H&C; Jubilee	Newham	2; 3	2 Jun 1902		1901	West Ham: 1901–1924; West Ham (Manor Road): 1924–1969	5.49	West Ham
West Hampstead	A brown-bricked building with a rectangular, dark blue sign reading "WEST HAMPSTEAD STATION" in white letters all under a blue sky	Jubilee	Camden	2	30 Jun 1879				8.43	West Hampstead
West Harrow	A brown-bricked building with a rectangular, light blue sign reading "WEST HARROW STATION" in white letters all under a light blue sky	Met.	Harrow	5	17 Nov 1913				1.22	Harrow
West Kensington	A white-bricked building with a rectangular, dark blue sign reading "WEST KENSINGTON STATION" in white letters all under a light blue sky	District	Hammersmith and Fulham	2	9 Sep 1874			North End (Fulham): 1874–1877	3.99	West Kensington
West Ruislip	A brown-bricked building with a rectangular, dark blue sign reading "WEST RUISLIP STATION" in white letters all under a light blue sky	Central	Hillingdon	6	21 Nov 1948		2 Apr 1906	Ruislip & Ickenham: 1906–1947; West Ruislip (for Ickenham): 1947, suffix gradually dropped	1.48	Ruislip
Westbourne Park	A dirty, white-bricked building with a rectangular, dark blue sign reading "WESTBOURNE PARK STATION" in white letters all under a blue sky	H&C; Circle	City of Westminster	2	1 Feb 1866	1 Nov 1871			3.92	Notting Hill
Westminster	A large crowd of people walking on a grey sidewalk next to a black road where two vehicles are driving from the left to the right	District; Circle; Jubilee	City of Westminster	1	24 Dec 1868			Westminster Bridge: 1868–1907	19.61	Westminster
White City	A brown-bricked building with a rectangular, dark blue sign reading "WHITE CITY STATION" in white letters all under a light blue sky	Central	Hammersmith and Fulham	2	23 Nov 1947				8.18	White City
Whitechapel	A beige-bricked building with a rectangular, dark blue sign reading "WHITECHAPEL STATION" in white letters all under a white sky	District; H&C	Tower Hamlets	2	1 Oct 1884		10 Apr 1876	Whitechapel (Mile End): 1884–1901	18.28	Whitechapel
Willesden Green	A white-bricked building with a rectangular, dark blue sign reading "WILLESDEN GREEN STATION" in white letters all under a light blue sky	Jubilee	Brent	2; 3	24 Nov 1879				5.80	Willesden
Willesden Junction	A white-panelled building with a rectangular, orange sign reading "Willesdon Junction" in white letters all under a light blue sky	Bakerloo	Brent	2; 3	10 May 1915				4.61	Harlesden
Wimbledon	A white-bricked building with a sign reading "Wimbledon" in red letters and people walking in front all under a light blue sky with white clouds	District	Merton	3	3 Jun 1889				17.40	Wimbledon
Wimbledon Park	A brown-and-red bricked building with a rectangular, dark blue sign reading "WIMBLEDON PARK STATION" in white letters all under a blue sky	District	Merton	3	3 Jun 1889				1.92	Wimbledon
Wood Green	A brown-bricked building with a rectangular, dark blue sign reading "WOOD GREEN STATION" in white letters all under a light blue sky	Piccadilly	Haringey	3	19 Sep 1932			Lordship Lane: proposed before opening	8.99	Wood Green
Wood Lane	A grey-panelled building with a rectangular, dark blue sign reading "WOOD LANE STATION" in white letters all under a cloudy sky	H&C; Circle	Hammersmith and Fulham	2	12 Oct 2008				5.20	Shepherd's Bush
Woodford	A red-bricked building with a rectangular, dark blue sign reading "WOODFORD STATION" in white letters all under a clear, white sky	Central	Redbridge	4	14 Dec 1947		22 Aug 1856		4.59	Woodford
Woodside Park	A beige-bricked building with a rectangular, dark blue sign reading "WOODSIDE PARK STATION" in white letters all under a blue sky	Northern	Barnet	4	12 Apr 1940		1 Apr 1872	Torrington Park, Woodside: 1872–1882; Woodside Park for North Finchley: 1882–1931; Woodside Park and North Finchley for Woodside Garden Suburb: 1931–1940	3.23	Woodside Park

== See also ==
- List of London railway stations
- List of Docklands Light Railway stations
- List of former and unopened London Underground stations
- List of busiest London Underground stations
- London Underground stations that are listed buildings
- Timeline of the London Underground
