= London Buses route 167 =

London bus route

167
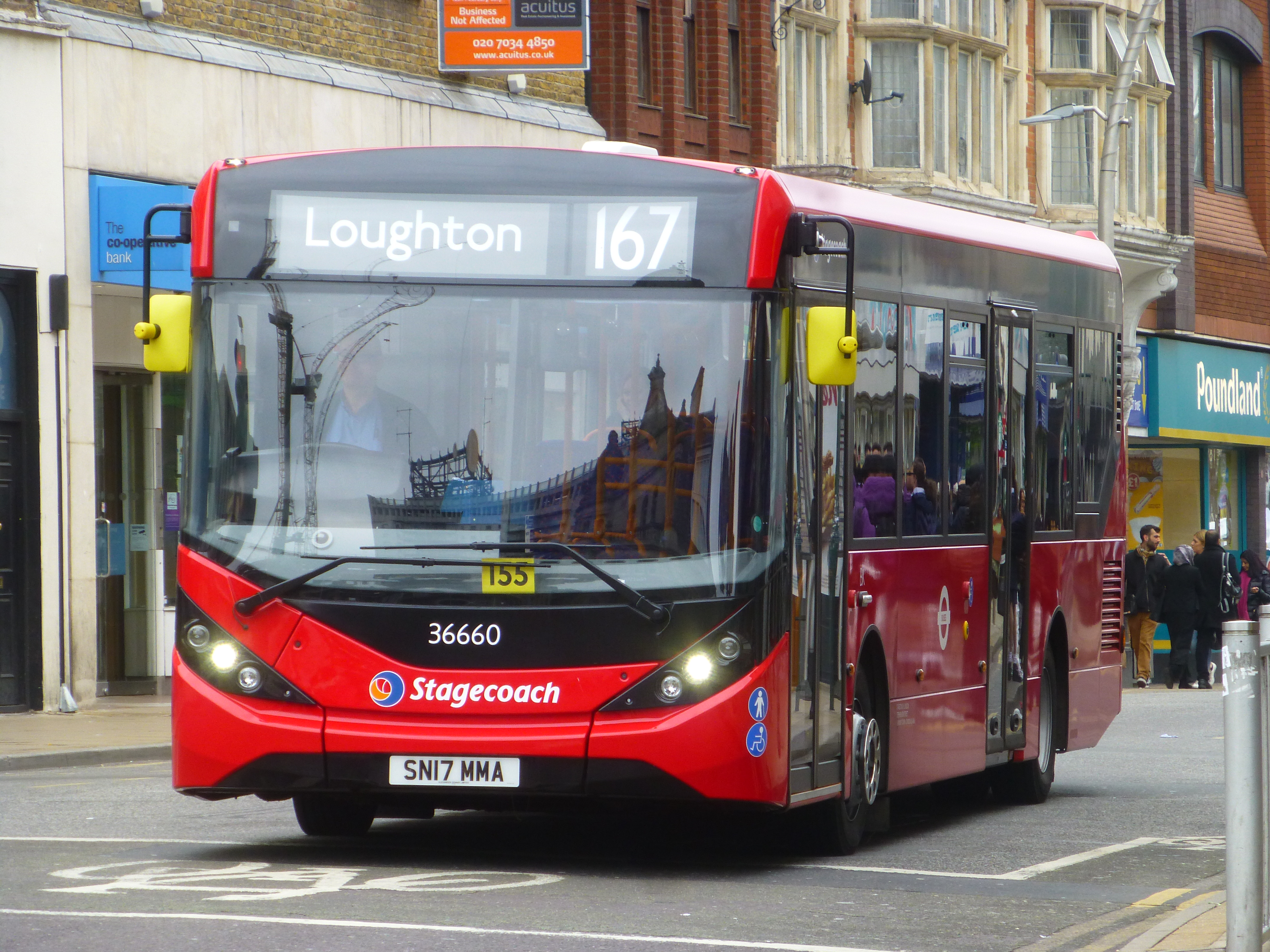
- East London Alexander Dennis Enviro200 MMC in Ilford in May 2017

Overview
- Operator: East London (Stagecoach London)
- Garage: Barking
- Vehicle: Alexander Dennis Enviro200 MMC
- Peak vehicle requirement: 7
- Began service: 5 May 1948
- Former operators: Go-Ahead London; Grey-Green; Eastern National Omnibus Company
- Night-time: No night service

Route
- Start: Ilford
- Via: Gants Hill; Barkingside; Chigwell; Buckhurst Hill
- End: Loughton station
- Length: 12 miles (19 km)

Service
- Level: Daily
- Frequency: About every 20-30 minutes
- Journey time: 39-76 minutes
- Operates: 05:57 until 00:38

London Buses route 167 is a Transport for London contracted bus route in London and Essex, England. Running between Ilford and Loughton station, it is operated by Stagecoach London subsidiary East London.

== History ==
A long standing London Transport route, the 167 was introduced in 1948 between Loughton and Barkingside, extended two years later to Ilford.

In 1986, ahead of deregulation outside London, all routes from Loughton Garage were put out to tender, some by Essex County Council and others, like the 167, by London Regional Transport. This resulted in the closure of Loughton Garage and routes 20 and 167 transferring from London Buses Limited to the Eastern National Omnibus Company. Upon being re-tendered, on 7 March 1992 the route passed to Grey-Green.

Upon being re-tendered, on 9 March 2002 route 167 passed to Docklands Buses. It was included in the September 2006 sale of Docklands Buses to Go-Ahead Group. Docklands Buses retained when re-tendered with a new contract commencing in March 2007. Blue Triangle successfully tendered to retain the route with a new contract commencing on 10 March 2012.

In November 2015, Essex County Council announced that it would withdraw its subsidy for the route. Concerns were immediately raised from local residents and the headteacher of Davenant Foundation School, who said the routes were used by many schoolchildren.

On 11 March 2017 the route was withdrawn between Loughton station and Debden station. East London took over operation of the route on the same date from its Barking garage. Following a question from Caroline Russell, the Mayor of London stated that it would cost more than £500,000 per year to keep operating the 167 route to Debden, and the predicted fare income would only cover 40% of that cost. Later that year, colour-coded branding was introduced on the majority of vehicles running the route.

During the summers of 2018 and 2019, the route was to be diverted, because of the reconstruction of Alderton Bridge, via new roads, Brook Road and Brooklyn Avenue, to rejoin the A121.

== Current route ==
Route 167 operates via these primary locations:

- Ilford Hainault Street
- Ilford station
- Gants Hill station
- Barkingside
- Fullwell Cross
- Chigwell station
- Buckhurst Hill station
- Pentlow way
- Loughton station
