= Abridge =

Village in Essex, England

Coordinates: 51.650°N 0.119°E

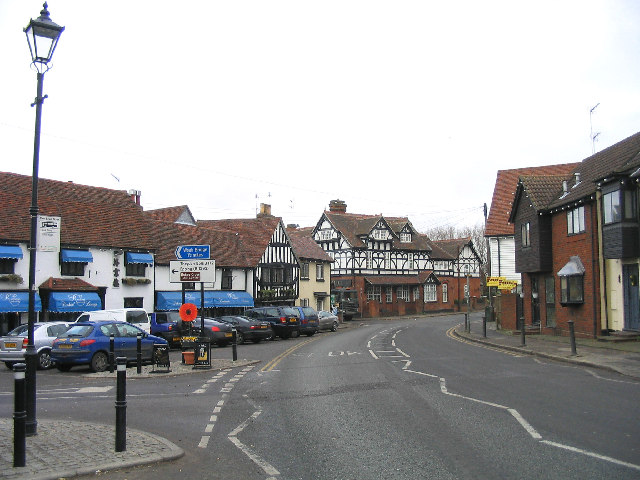

- Location within Essex
- Population: 1,500 (2001 Census)
- OS grid reference: TQ466969
- Civil parish: Lambourne
- District: Epping Forest
- Shire county: Essex
- Region: East
- Country: England
- Sovereign state: United Kingdom
- Post town: ROMFORD
- Postcode district: RM4
- Dialling code: 01992
- Police: Essex
- Fire: Essex
- Ambulance: East of England
- UK Parliament: Brentwood and Ongar

Abridge is a village in Essex, England. It is on the River Roding, 16 miles (26 km) southwest of the county town of Chelmsford. The village is in the district of Epping Forest and in the parliamentary constituency of Brentwood and Ongar. It is part of the civil parish of Lambourne and is served by Lambourne Parish Council.

It takes its name from the brick bridge over the River Roding, which is situated just to the north of the modern centre, on the road to Theydon Bois.

== History ==
Abridge lies on the historically important stagecoach route between London and Chipping Ongar and has been an important crossing point of the River Roding for many centuries. The boundary of the Conservation Area includes the historic core of the village which is evident on the Chapman and Andre Map of 1777. Originally in the parish of Lambourne, Holy Trinity Church was built in 1836; before this, parishioners had to walk three miles to Lambourne Church by a footpath. A Wesleyan chapel was built in Abridge in 1833; it became Congregational in 1844. The hymn tune "Abridge" by Isaac Smith 1734–1805 was named after the village.

Listed buildings include the Blue Boar Inn (early 19th century), the group of medieval buildings that form the Roding Restaurant, the 18th-century house immediately northeast of the restaurant, Roding House (late medieval), River Cottage in Ongar Road, and the Maltsters Arms (18th century).

To the east of the village is Stapleford Aerodrome formerly RAF Stapleford Tawney of 11 Group east sector.

== Geography ==
The village is in the southwest of the county, 16 miles (26 km) from Chelmsford. It is closer to London, being 14 miles (23 km) northeast of central London. It lies on the River Roding and is surrounded by a rural area. The nearest major settlements are Loughton 2.2 miles (3.5 km) to the West, Chigwell 2.4 miles (3.9 km) to the southwest and Theydon Bois 1.7 miles (2.7 km) north of the village.

It lies within the M25, and its closest major road link is the M11 motorway at junction 5 (towards London only). The main road that links the village with the M11 and Essex and London is the A113. Its nearest rail link is Theydon Bois tube station, on the Central line (London fare zone 6), 1.6 miles (2.6 km) to the north of the village. The 541 bus links the village with Loughton, Theydon Bois and Epping. It extends to Harlow on Sundays. On Mon-Fri, the 575 service links the town with Epping and Romford, though these buses are very infrequent.

== Sports ==
Abridge has a local cricket club and golf club.

== Transport ==
=== Bus ===
Currently routes 418 and 575 serve the village. London Transport route 10 ran daily to London Bridge until 1964, with various extensions to Victoria station and Elephant and Castle.

=== Rail ===
The nearest railway stations are Loughton, Debden and Theydon Bois on the London Underground. Bus route 418 (Loughton to Epping) serves all of these stations daily.

== Notable residents ==
- Alan Curbishley, football club manager
