= Theydon =

Theydon may refer to 3 places in Essex:

- Theydon Bois
  - Theydon Bois tube station
- Theydon Garnon
- Theydon Mount
