= Debden =

Debden may refer to:

== Places ==
=== Canada ===
- Debden, Saskatchewan, Canada

=== England ===
- Debden, Epping Forest, a suburb of Loughton, in the Epping Forest district of Essex
  - Debden House, a residential adult education college in Loughton, Essex
  - Debden tube station, a London Underground station in Loughton, Essex
- Debden, Uttlesford, a small rural village in the Uttlesford district of Essex
  - RAF Debden, a former RAF station near Debden, Uttlesford

== See also ==
- Deben (disambiguation)
