= Deben =

Deben may refer to:

- Deben (unit), a weight unit used in ancient Egypt
- Deben Rural District, a former district of East Suffolk, England
- River Deben, a river in Suffolk, England
- John Gummer, Baron Deben
- Deben, a variant spelling of Dibeng, Northern Cape, South Africa

== See also ==
- Debden (disambiguation)
