= Lambourne =

Civil parish in Essex, England

Coordinates: 51.638°N 0.130°E

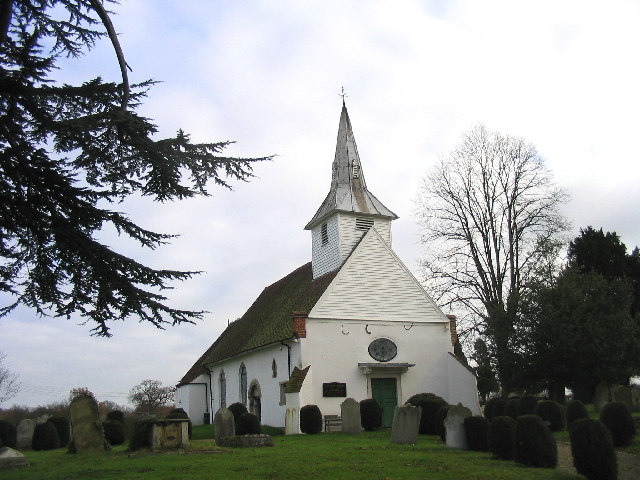
- Parish church of St Mary and All Saints

- Location within Essex
- Interactive map of Lambourne
- Area: 10.5 km^{2} (4.1 sq mi)
- Population: 2,051 (Parish, 2021)
  - Density: 195/km^{2} (510/sq mi)
- OS grid reference: TQ479961
  - London: 14.5 mi (23.3 km) SW
- Civil parish: Lambourne
- District: Epping Forest
- Shire county: Essex
- Region: East
- Country: England
- Sovereign state: United Kingdom
- Post town: ROMFORD
- Postcode district: RM4
- Dialling code: 020; 01992
- Police: Essex
- Fire: Essex
- Ambulance: East of England
- UK Parliament: Brentwood and Ongar
- Website: Lambourne Parish Council

Lambourne is a civil parish in the Epping Forest district of Essex, England. It is located approximately 4.5 miles (7 km) south of Epping and 5 miles (8 km) northwest of Romford. The small settlement of Lambourne itself comprises just the parish church and a couple of houses. The largest settlement in the parish is the village of Abridge, and the parish also includes the hamlet of Lambourne End. At the 2021 census the parish had a population of 2,051.

== History ==
Like much of the neighbouring area, Lambourne was thickly wooded in the Middle Ages with forest gradually being cleared for agriculture. A few remnants of the historic Hainault Forest are found in the southern fringe of the parish, and now form part of a country park.

Its population was 505 in 1801 rising to 904 by 1841, remaining at about that level for the next century.

Historically Lambourne was included in the hundred of Ongar. It formed part of the Ongar Rural District from 1894 to 1955, and then Epping and Ongar Rural District until it became part of Epping Forest District in 1974.

== Geography ==
The parish is mostly rural and agricultural, and lies in the valley of the River Roding which forms the northern boundary of the parish. The parish is mostly hilly, rising to above 100 metres in its centre. There is no actual village called Lambourne, the principal settlement being the village of Abridge in the far northwest of the parish, with the other main concentration of houses at the hamlet of Lambourne End to the south. A scattering of farms and houses is found throughout the rest of the parish. To the south of the parish, and extending into Greater London, is Hainault Forest Country Park, managed by the Woodland Trust. Postal addresses in the parish come under the RM4 postcode district of the Romford post town.

== Landmarks ==
The medieval parish church of St Mary is in an isolated location next to the Hall, as is typical for Essex, rather than near a centre of population. It has an unusual Georgian internal remodelling. Lieutenant Colonel Amelius Lockwood, 1st Baron Lambourne, soldier and politician, is buried in the churchyard.

== Transport ==
Stapleford Aerodrome is located in the east of the parish. Another aviation connection is its status as the location of LAM, a VOR navigational beacon which anchors the North East (NE) Arrival Stack for London Heathrow Airport (ICAO: EGLL / IATA: LHR), which along with Biggin Hill (BIG - SE Arrivals), Bovingdon, Hertfordshire (BNN - NW Arrivals) and Ockham, Surrey (OCK - SW Arrivals) are London's main holds.
