= Ernest Walbourn =

British painter

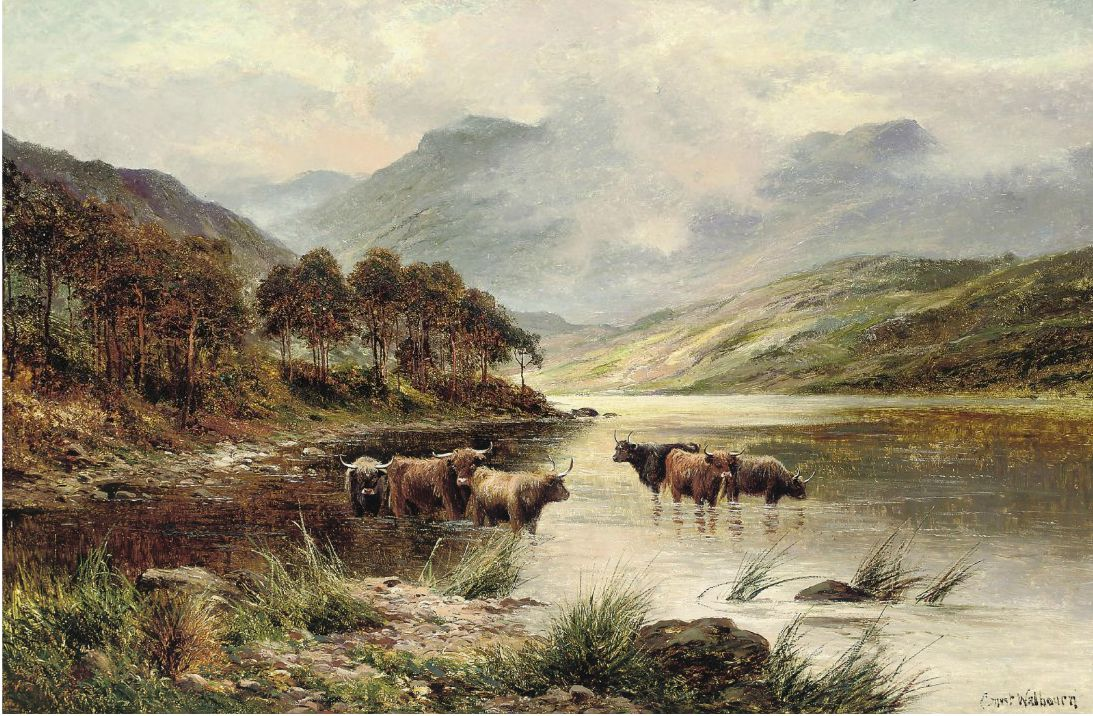
Highland cattle watering

Ernest Charles Walbourn (16 February 1872 – 29 June 1927) was a British landscape painter of rural and farming scenes.

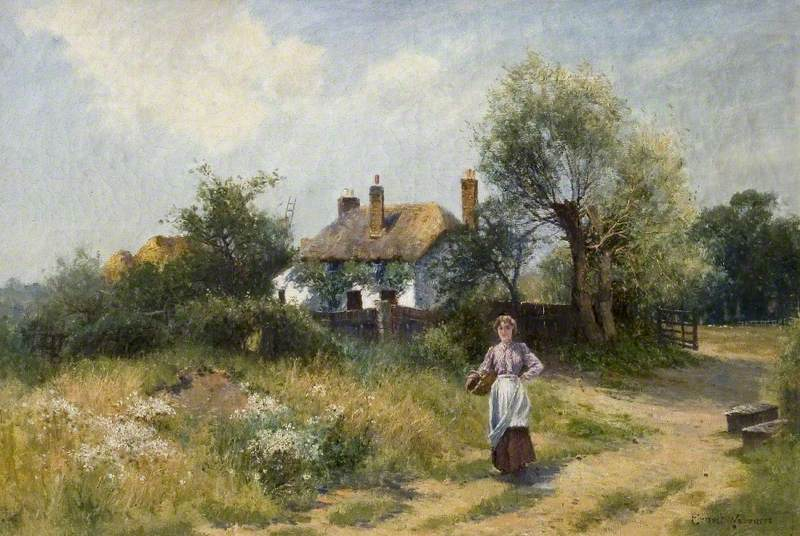
Landscape with a Cottage and a Woman

== Life ==
Walbourn was born on 16 February 1872 in Dalston, Middlesex, England, and his birth was registered in the Hackney district in the first quarter of that year. He was the second of five children. His father, who owned property in Tasmania, initially disapproved of his artistic ambitions, but later helped with the setting up of a studio at the family home and the funding of his art training. He was educated at the Kingsland Birkbeck Schools in Colvestone Crescent, Dalston, where in December 1886 he won prizes for writing and advanced drawing.

In 1890, aged 18, he won first prize in the original watercolour landscape class at the annual exhibition of the Woodford Industrial and Art Society. The following year he took first prizes for oil landscape, watercolour landscape, and a copy of an Old Master.

In 1895 he settled in Chingford, Essex and began exhibiting at the Royal Institute of Oil Painters. In 1896 a set of his sketches was shown at a reunion of old scholars of the Birkbeck Schools, alongside works by the painter George Swinstead, where the Hackney Mercury described him as "that rising young artist, Mr. Ernest Walbourn, of Chingford". In 1897 he had two paintings hung at the Royal Academy, Gathering Field Peas and Poppies among the Peas, and he exhibited five works there between 1897 and 1904, among them On the Allotments. He showed In Sheltered Vale at the Academy in 1905, when the Chelmsford Chronicle listed him among the Essex artists represented at the Academy, with George Clausen and others. He also exhibited at the Royal Society of British Artists, and his works were well received, many being sold through the London art dealers W. W. Sampson & Louis Wolfe. In 1905 his A Scene in Surrey was among the pictures offered for sale by Harland and Co. at their galleries in Aldershot.

In 1906, he married Eva Gardner Knight, who assisted by painting the backgrounds of some of his larger works, later achieving recognition in her own right. They had at least three sons, Ernest Dicksee, Derrick, and Peter.

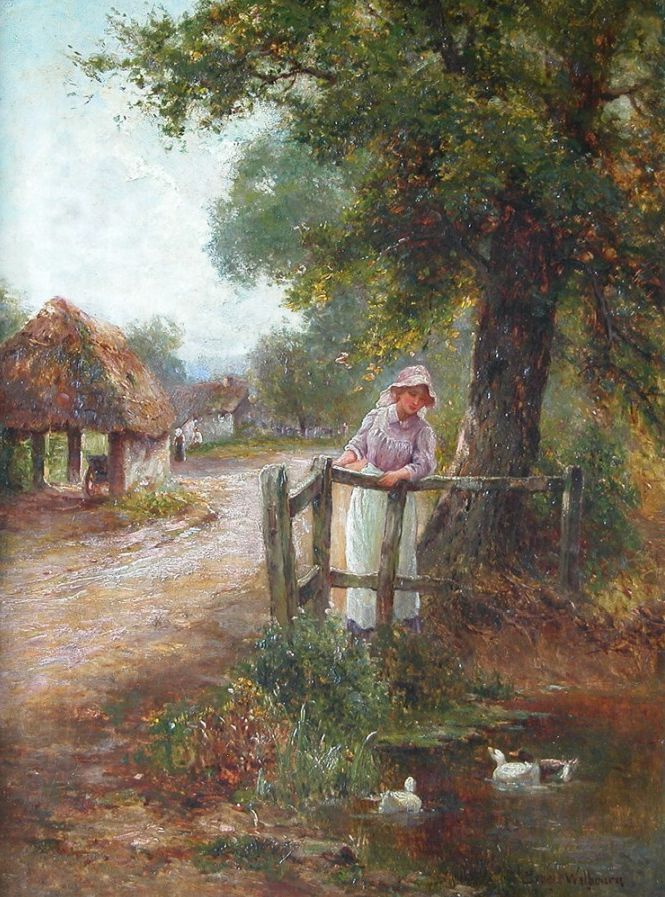
Relaxing by the Duck Pond

By 1911 he and his family were living at Longworth, Piercing Hill, Theydon Bois, where he gave his occupation as artist (painter) working on his own account. He was still living there in 1921. In 1917 his Summer Time was hung "on the line" at the Royal Academy.

He died on 29 June 1927, aged 55, his residence at the time being Theydon Bois. Probate was granted in London on 19 September 1927 to William Milner Knight, and his estate was valued at £15,047.

== Reception ==
The Benezit Dictionary of Artists lists his subjects as genre scenes, figures, portraits, and landscapes, including landscapes with figures and waterscapes. In 1994 an antiques columnist in the Liverpool Daily Post described him as a figure painter whose landscapes often include figures in country scenes, and valued his original paintings at £800 to £5,000 depending on subject, size and condition; she noted that many reproductions of his work exist.

== Selected works ==
- Gathering Field Peas (Royal Academy, 1897, no. 272)
- Poppies among the Peas (Royal Academy, 1897, no. 548)
- On the Allotments (Royal Academy, between 1897 and 1904)
- In Sheltered Vale (Royal Academy, 1905, no. 328)
- Summer Time (Royal Academy, 1917)
