= Debden, Epping Forest =

Suburb of Loughton, Essex, England

Coordinates: 51.6455°N 0.0838°E

Debden
- Location within Essex
- OS grid reference: TQ442962
- Civil parish: Loughton
- District: Epping Forest
- Shire county: Essex
- Region: East
- Country: England
- Sovereign state: United Kingdom
- Post town: LOUGHTON
- Postcode district: IG10
- Dialling code: 020
- Police: Essex
- Fire: Essex
- Ambulance: East of England
- UK Parliament: Epping Forest

Debden is a suburb in the civil parish of Loughton, in the Epping Forest district of Essex, England. It takes its name from the ancient manor of Debden, which lay at its northern end. The area is predominantly residential, but is also the location of Davenant Foundation School, New City College, East 15 Acting School and the De La Rue printing works. It is one of a limited number of places outside Greater London to be served by the London Underground.

== History ==
The name (Deppendana in the Domesday Book of 1086) is derived from the Old English dep, 'deep' and den, 'valley'.

Debden originated as a manor of 40 acres (160,000 m^{2}) in the Ongar hundred of Essex. The manor became the property of Waltham Abbey in 1086. By about 1254 the manor of Loughton had absorbed Debden. Following the Dissolution of the Monasteries in 1540 the manor passed to the king and later to private owners.

In 1944 John Maitland sold 644 acres (261 ha) of land to the London County Council for the building of a housing estate. The Debden Estate was constructed between 1947 and 1952. Because of post-war restrictions on building, a supermarket could not be opened until 1952.

Debden station on the London Underground is a renaming (1949) of the Chigwell Lane railway station, which was originally opened on the Great Eastern Railway in 1865.

== Economy ==
There is considerable light industry, including the De La Rue print works, which prints Bank of England banknotes. In 2005, Higgins Group PLC moved its headquarters to Debden, and, in 2008, Amstrad announced its intention to move the group HQ to Debden from Brentwood. A new HQ was opened in 2013 nearer the centre of Loughton. The Broadway is one of Loughton's two main shopping centres and forms an architecturally important parade consisting mainly of family-run shops together with a small weekly market.

== Transport ==
The area is served by Debden tube station on the Central line of the London Underground.

Debden is located next to the M11 motorway, about 2 miles (3.2 km) from its junction with the M25 motorway. The local motorway junction has restricted access: drivers cannot enter the M11 northbound or exit it southbound. These restrictions are designed to prevent congestion on the local road network. Motorway traffic must instead flow to and from the North Circular road.

There are many bus routes in Debden, which are either London Buses routes, commercial routes or Essex County Council contract routes. London Buses routes 20 and 397 serve destinations south of Debden such as Chingford, South Woodford and Walthamstow. Routes operating to destinations north and east of Debden are commercial services Destinations include Epping, Harlow, Romford, Theydon Bois, Abridge, Waltham Abbey and Waltham Cross.

== Sport, culture and politics ==
The local Debden Sports Club, founded in 1948, includes a football team that competes in local leagues. In Boxing, Dennis & Dyer Boxing Academy located off of Debden Broadway opened in 2020, teaches boxing at amateur and professional level by British Boxing Board of Control certified coaches. Until 2014, there was an annual Debden Day celebration. Debden is the location of the British Postal Museum Store. Debden Community Association was founded circa 1950 and formerly had premises at Loughton Hall and on land owned by Epping Forest College. Most council seats in Debden were held until 2004 by the Labour Party. Then a swing to the British National Party occurred, but the BNP lost its last seat to the Loughton Residents Association in 2012. See main article Politics of Loughton.

== See also ==
- Loughton incinerator thefts
