= Buckhurst Hill tube station =

London Underground station

Buckhurst Hill
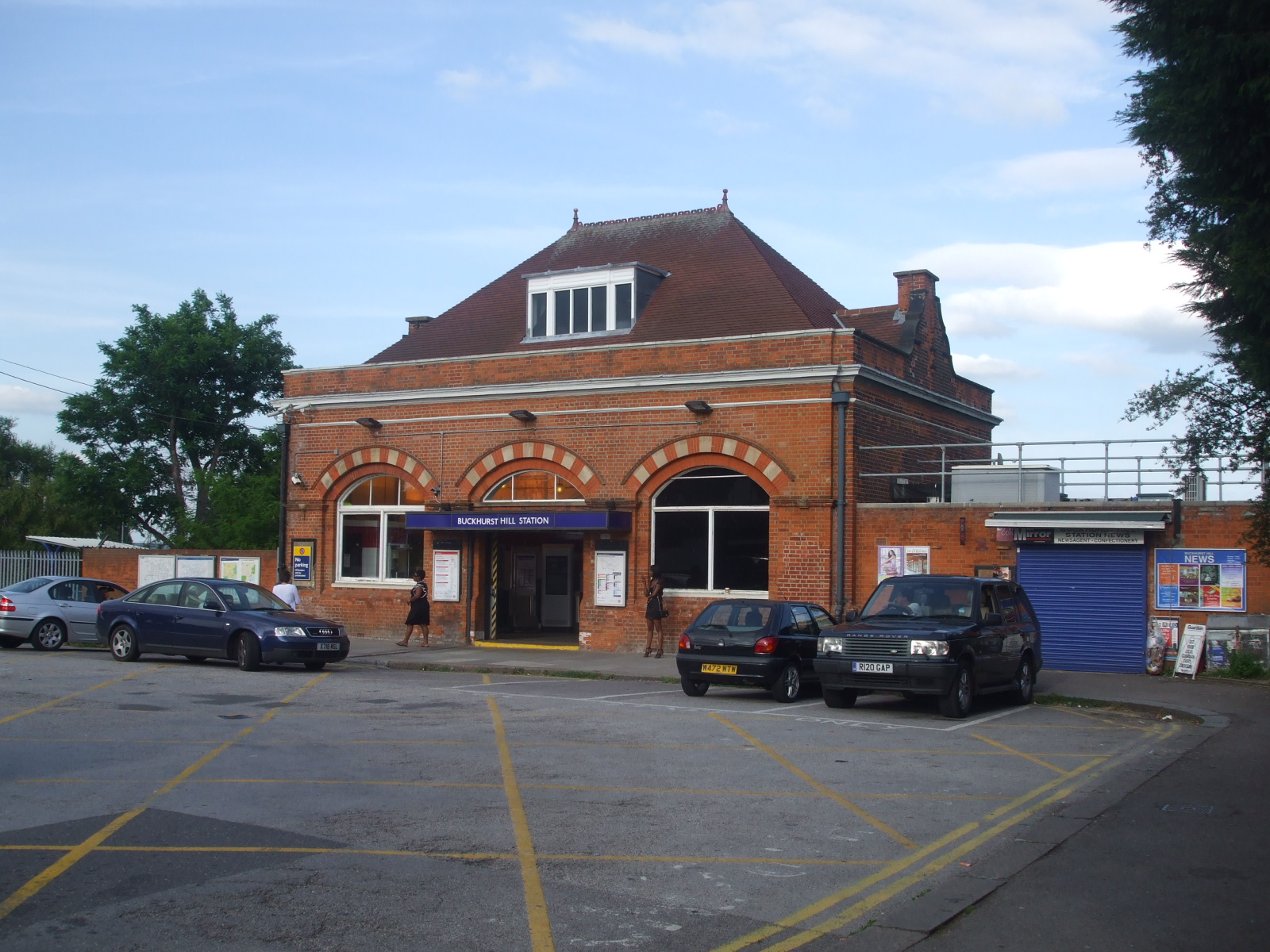
- Buckhurst Hill station
- Interactive map of Buckhurst Hill

General information
- Location: Buckhurst Hill
- Local authority: District of Epping Forest
- Number of platforms: 2
- Accessible: Yes
- Fare zone: 5

London Underground annual entry and exit
- 2020: ▼0.86 million
- 2021: ▲1.07 million
- 2022: ▲1.68 million
- 2023: ▲1.79 million
- 2024: ▲2.24 million

Key dates
- 22 August 1856: Opened
- 1892: Resited
- 6 January 1966: Goods yard closed

Other information
- External links: TfL station info page
- Coordinates: 51.62666°N 0.04694°E

Buckhurst Hill is a London Underground station, serving the suburban town of Buckhurst Hill, in the Epping Forest District of Essex, England. It is on the Central line between Woodford and Loughton stations, and is in London fare zone 5. It is the larger of the two Underground stations in the town of Buckhurst Hill, with Roding Valley being the smaller.

== History ==
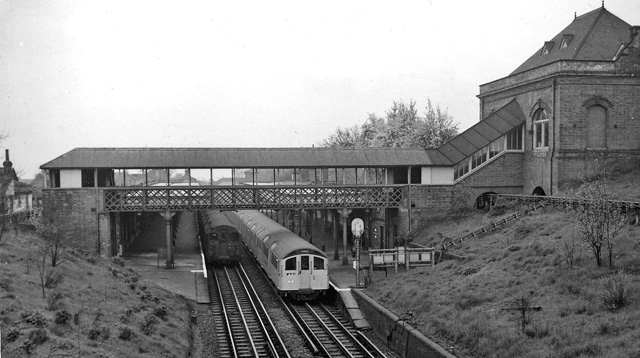
The station in 1961

The station opened on 22 August 1856 as part of the Eastern Counties Railway branch from London to Loughton. It originally had staggered platforms, with the main buildings on the down side (tracks heading away from London). The 1856 station house survives, in a derelict condition, to the south of the present platforms, but most of the present station dates from 1892, when the entrance was moved to Victoria Road. The building is similar to that at Billericay. Both were designed by W. N. Ashbee, the chief architect of the Great Eastern Railway, and became part of the London and North Eastern Railway in 1923.

The station was transferred to London Underground ownership on 21 November 1948, as part of the New Works Programme, 1935-1940 scheme that saw the electrification of the branch to form part of the Central line. The station maintains its late Victorian ambiance.

When the line was electrified, a pedestrian underpass was built in order to connect the two parts of Queens Road previously joined by a level crossing. At the same time, a pair of exit/entrances to the south of the station were built giving direct access to Lower Queens Road and Queens Road via the new underpass. These exits were closed in 1982, but were reopened in May 2018 in order to provide access to the station for mobility impaired passengers.

== Services ==
Buckhurst Hill station is on the Central line in London fare zone 5. It is between Woodford to the west and Loughton to the east. Train frequencies vary throughout the day, but generally operate every 5–10 minutes between 05:24 and 01:04 eastbound, and every 5–10 minutes between 05:22 and 00:48 westbound.

For the purposes of fare charging, it is in Zone 5. As of 2007, it is the only station on the eastern portion of the Central line in that zone. Passengers travelling from the station leaving in either direction must cross a zone boundary.

Preceding station	London Underground	Following station
Woodford towards Ealing Broadway or West Ruislip	Central line	Loughton towards Epping
Historical railways
Woodford; Line and station open	Great Eastern Railway; Eastern Counties Railway; Loughton branch	Loughton; Line and station open
