= Theydon Bois tube station =

London Underground station

Theydon Bois
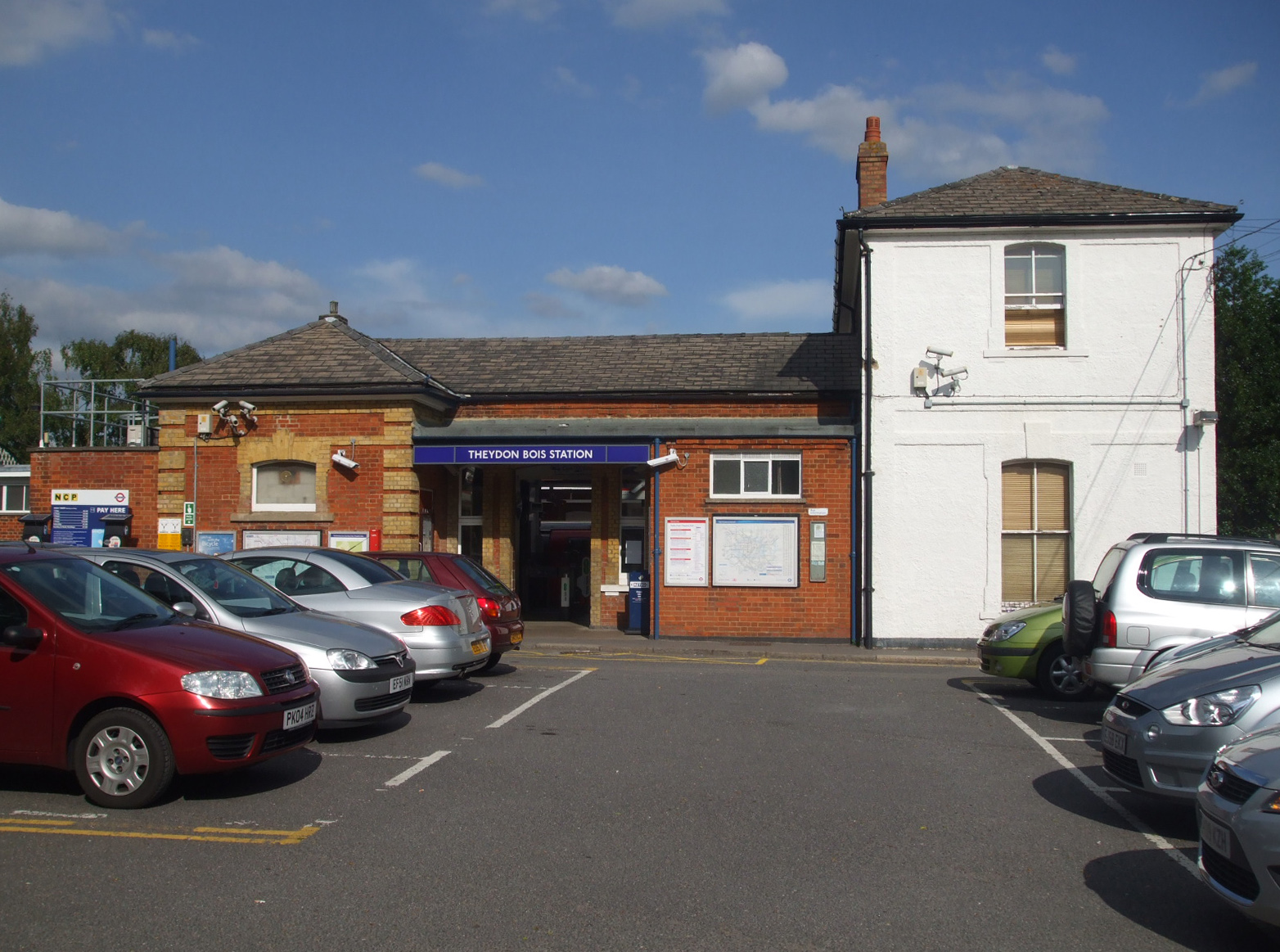
- Station entrance
- Interactive map of Theydon Bois

General information
- Location: Theydon Bois
- Local authority: District of Epping Forest
- Managed by: London Underground
- Number of platforms: 2
- Accessible: Yes (Eastbound only)
- Fare zone: 6

London Underground annual entry and exit
- 2020: ▼0.49 million
- 2021: ▼0.42 million
- 2022: ▲0.68 million
- 2023: ▲0.73 million
- 2024: ▲0.74 million

Key dates
- 24 April 1865: Opened
- 25 September 1949: London Underground services start
- 18 April 1966: Goods yard closed

Other information
- External links: TfL station info page
- Coordinates: 51.67166°N 0.10333°E

Theydon Bois (/ˌθeɪdən ˈbɔɪz, - ˈbɔɪs/ THAY-dən BOYZ, - BOYSS) is a London Underground station, located in the village of Theydon Bois in Essex, England. It is on the Central line, between Debden and Epping stations. It is in London fare zone 6.

== History ==
The station was opened as "Theydon" by the Great Eastern Railway (GER) on 24 April 1865 but in December that year it was renamed to its present name. It opened as an intermediate station on their Loughton–Ongar extension; the GER became part of the London and North Eastern Railway (LNER) in 1923. 'Milk trains' to Liverpool Street were a regular feature in the timetable until the underpass from Leyton to Stratford was built.

As part of the New Works Programme, 1935–1940, the LNER branch was transferred to London Underground, to form the part of the eastern extension of the Central line.

In 2015, advocacy by a local group forced a proposed 80-space commuter car park to seek planning permission before being constructed on land adjacent to the station.

== The station today ==
The station was one of the first on the Underground network to operate without a staffed ticket office.

Preceding station	London Underground	Following station
Debden towards Ealing Broadway or West Ruislip	Central line	Epping Terminus
Historical railways
Chigwell Lane; Line and station open	Great Eastern Railway; Loughton-Ongar	Epping; Line and station open
