= Loughton tube station =

London Underground station

Loughton
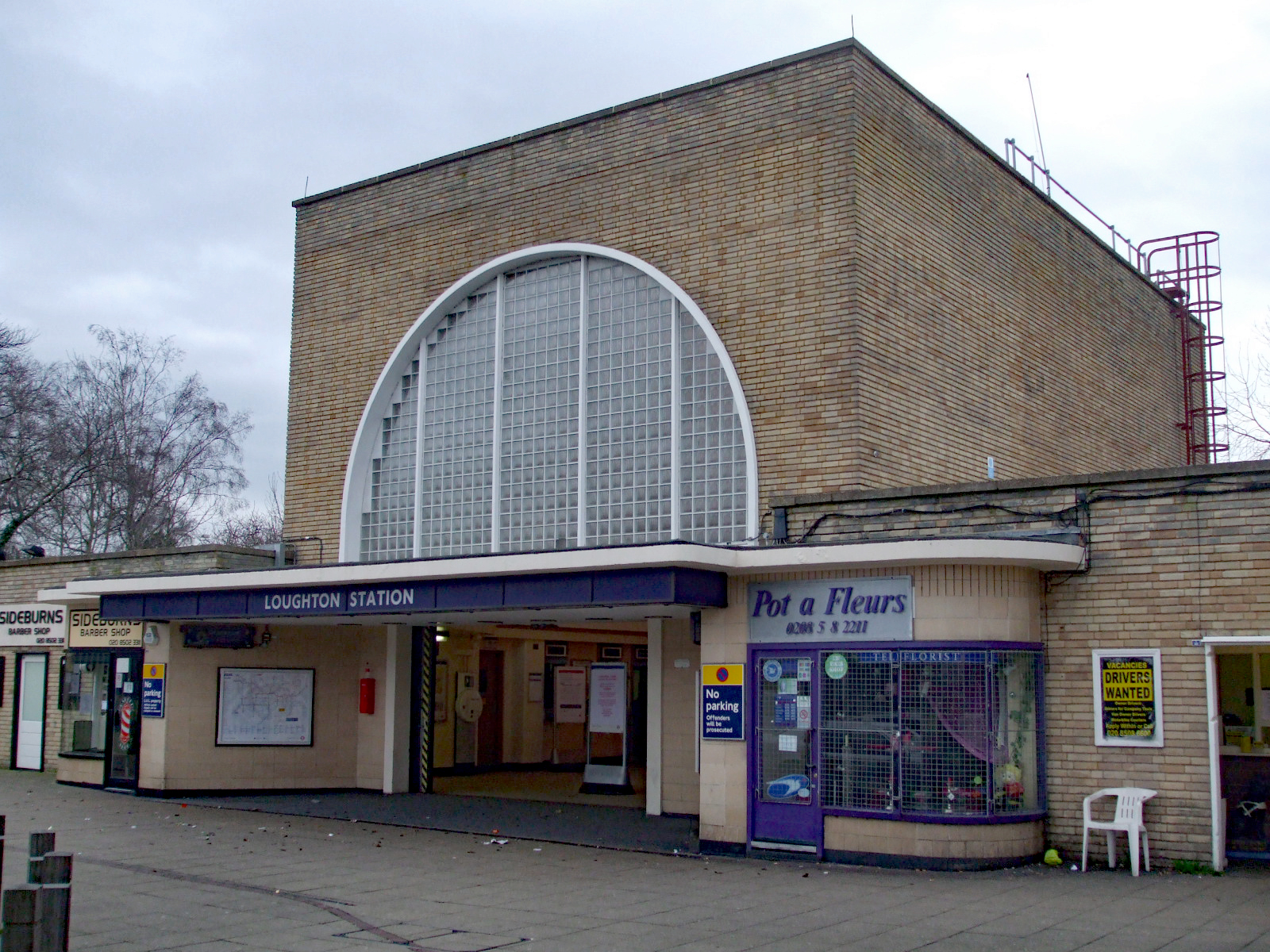
- Station entrance
- Interactive map of Loughton

General information
- Location: Loughton
- Local authority: District of Epping Forest
- Managed by: London Underground
- Number of platforms: 3
- Fare zone: 6

London Underground annual entry and exit
- 2021: ▼1.61 million
- 2022: ▲2.65 million
- 2023: ▲2.75 million
- 2024: ▼2.67 million
- 2025: ▲2.70 million

Key dates
- 22 August 1856: First station opened
- 24 April 1865: Second station opened
- 28 April 1940: Third (present) station opened
- 18 April 1966: Goods yard closed

Listed status
- Listing grade: II
- Entry number: 1141221
- Added to list: 17 May 1994; 32 years ago

Other information
- External links: TfL station info page
- Coordinates: 51.64138°N 0.05527°E

Loughton (/ˈlaʊtən/) is a London Underground station, serving the suburban town of Loughton in the Epping Forest District of Essex. It is on the Central line between Buckhurst Hill and Debden stations, and is in London fare zone 6. The station is entirely above ground, and platforms are accessed by staircases which rise from ground level.

It is the larger of the two Underground stations in the town of Loughton, with Debden station being the smaller. It acts as a terminus for services from Ealing Broadway at peak hours.

== History ==
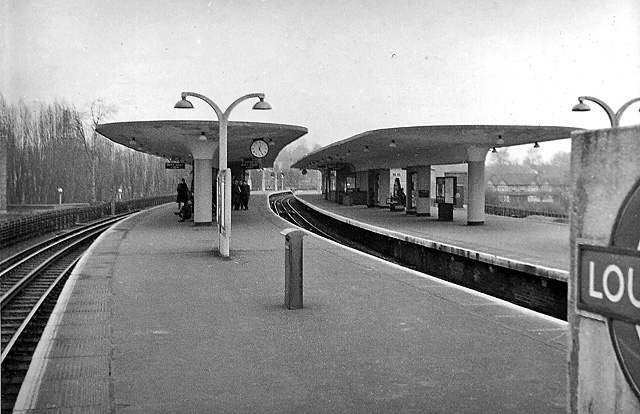
View NE, towards Epping and Ongar in 1957

The original station was opened by the Eastern Counties Railway on 22 August 1856 and formed the terminus of the branch from London. The actual location of the station building was on the site of what is now the garden and emergency exit of 179-181 Loughton High Road (Aura Bar & Grill in 2024) and of No. 9 Station Road, on a continuation of what eventually became the goods sidings, the line running across what are now the houses and gardens on the west side of Station Road. The post-1865 goods and carriage sidings no longer exist and were located where the present car parks are. The pre-1865 station also had sidings and a coal wharf, extending almost to what is now St Mary's Church. This station is extensively documented in H. .W Paar and others, Loughton's First Station 2002 and in Pond, Strugnell and Martin The Loughton Railway 150 years on, 2006. There was also an excursion station or platform constructed along the westernmost edge of the goods yard site; this was used for the many thousands of excursionists who arrived at Loughton to visit nearby Epping Forest. The excursion station building, single-storey and brick built, was extant in 1935, but was demolished in the ensuing decade; it was replaced by a parcels and goods station, itself removed in the 1990s.

It was re-sited some 500 yards to the south on 24 April 1865 as part of the extension of the line to Epping and Ongar. A new station was opened on 28 April 1940 in readiness for London Underground trains, which took over the service from British Railways (Eastern Region) on 21 November 1948.

== The station today ==
The current station is of notable architectural importance and is a Grade II listed building. Designed by John Murray Easton for the London and North Eastern Railway, on behalf of London Transport, the main structure consists of a high, square block dominated by large arched windows at high level. The main elevation is flanked by symmetrical wings and, to the south, a single storey extension. The whole building, as well as the associated disused signal cabin and sub-station, is finished in carefully bonded, incised, gault bricks. The ticket hall takes the form of a lofty arched hall, from which leads a subway that gives access to the two island platforms. The platforms are dominated by graceful, gull-winged shaped reinforced canopies that were altered during 1980s renovations. Although some original platform furniture has been lost the timber platform benches, with the London Underground roundel forming the seat backs, survive.

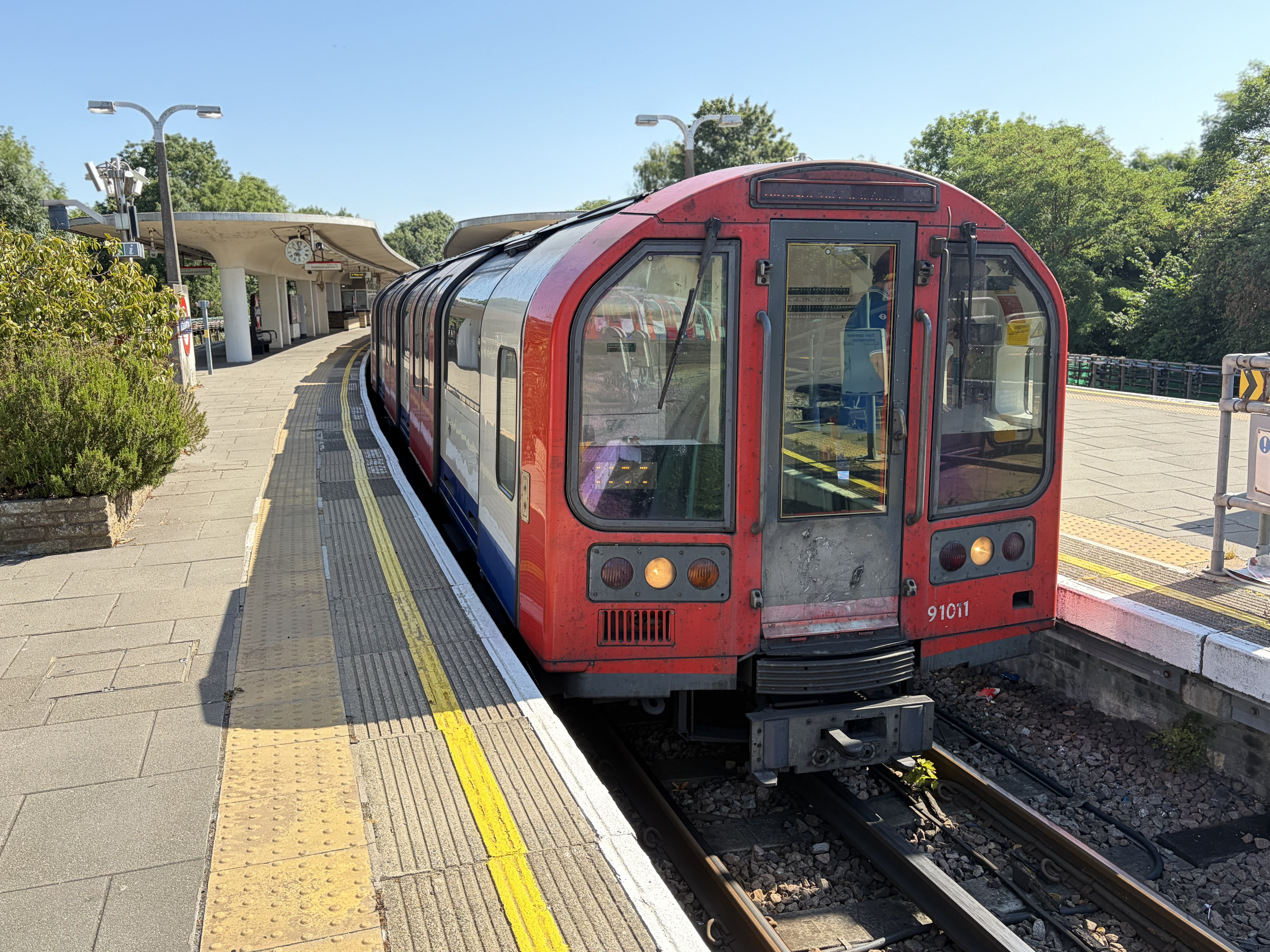
1992 Stock on the middle platform

The station has four platform faces and three tracks, with the middle bi-directional track usually used for services that terminate at the station. Those eastbound services that terminate at Loughton mostly return to central London, although some go into Loughton sidings (usually after the evening peak and late at night) which can accommodate 10 trains. A traincrew depot ("the Powerhouse") was converted from the matching electrical substation to the north-east of the station in 2006.

== Services ==
Loughton station is on the Central line in London fare zone 6. It is between Buckhurst Hill to the west and Debden to the east. The typical off-peak service in trains per hour (tph) is:

- 9 tph eastbound to Epping
- 3 tph terminate here
- 9 tph westbound to West Ruislip
- 3 tph westbound to Northolt

Preceding station	London Underground	Following station
Buckhurst Hill towards Ealing Broadway or West Ruislip	Central line	Debden towards Epping
Buckhurst Hill towards Ealing Broadway or West Ruislip	Central line Night Tube only	Terminus
Historical railways
Buckhurst Hill; Line and station open	Great Eastern Railway; Eastern Counties Railway Loughton branch Loughton-Ongar	Debden; Line and station open

== Connections ==
A number of London Buses routes serve the station.
