= Theydon Bois =

Village in Essex, England

Coordinates: 51.6713°N 0.1034°E

- Forest Drive

- Location within Essex
- Interactive map of Theydon Bois
- Population: 4,186 (Parish, 2021); 3,419 (Built up area, 2021)
- OS grid reference: TQ455990
- Civil parish: Theydon Bois
- District: Epping Forest
- Shire county: Essex
- Region: East
- Country: England
- Sovereign state: United Kingdom
- Post town: EPPING
- Postcode district: CM16
- Dialling code: 01992
- Police: Essex
- Fire: Essex
- Ambulance: East of England
- UK Parliament: Epping Forest

Theydon Bois (/ˌθeɪdən ˈbɔɪz, - ˈbɔɪs/ THAY-dən BOYZ, - BOYSS) is a village and civil parish in the Epping Forest district of Essex, England. It is 1 mile (1.6 km) south of Epping, 1 mile (1.6 km) north-east of Loughton and 6 miles (9.7 km) south of Harlow. At the 2021 census the parish had a population of 4,186 and the built up area had a population of 3,419.

Theydon Bois is inside the M25 London orbital motorway, near its junction with the M11 motorway. It is served by Theydon Bois tube station on the Central line of the London Underground, and has one primary school, Theydon Bois Primary School. It lies on the edge of Epping Forest, and is well known in the area for having no street lights.

== History ==
=== Manor and name ===
Theydon Bois takes its name from the family of Bois (previously, and variously, de Bois, de Boys or de Bosco), which held the manor in the 12th and 13th centuries. "Theydon" is thought to mean a valley where thatching material grows. For the village name, the pronunciation is either "boyce" or "boys". The ancient parish contained 2,198 acres. About 60 acres in the north were transferred to Epping Urban District in 1896, with further small boundary changes in 1934 and 1946.

The manor was given to Waltham Abbey by John, son of Peter de Taney, and remained with the abbey until the Dissolution, when it passed to the Crown. Edward VI granted it to Sir Thomas Wroth, and it was later bought by Edward Elrington, whose heirs sold it about 1656 to John Smart, a London merchant. It afterwards passed through the Meggot, Lethieullier, Hopkins and Dare families.

Theydon Hall, which is on the site of the ancient manor house, is south of the green on the Abridge road. It ceased to be the manor house early in the 17th century, its place being taken by Birch Hall half a mile west. Parsonage Farm, east of the railway station, probably dates from the 15th century, and the parish almshouses in Coppice Row from the 18th.

=== Churches ===
The medieval parish church stood beside Theydon Hall and was demolished in 1843. Its church and advowson had been given by William de Bosco to the priory of St Bartholomew, West Smithfield, a gift confirmed by Henry III in a charter of 15 June 1253, after which the living became a curacy served by the priory's canons. In 1814 the building was described as a small, low church with a wooden cupola containing three bells.

Its replacement, built nearer the centre of the population, was consecrated by the Bishop of London on 5 June 1844, but defects appeared almost at once and by 1849 the fabric was judged unsound. A fresh start was agreed, and the present church of St Mary, designed by Sydney Smirke, opened for worship on 9 February 1851. Three bells and a set of hatchments were brought from the old church, among them a royal coat of arms of James I.

=== Village and parish ===
In the Middle Ages, Theydon Bois was thinly populated. In 1428 it was one of the few parishes in the hundred exempted from taxation because it contained fewer than ten households. Chapman and André's map of 1777 shows about a dozen houses around Theydon Green and few others in the parish. The population was 334 in 1801 and 610 in 1861.

The extension of the railway from Loughton to Epping and Ongar in 1865, and the opening of Theydon Bois station in the same year, were mainly responsible for the building development that followed; the line as far as Epping was electrified in 1949 and became part of the Central line. The population rose to 1,257 by 1901, 1,504 by 1931 and 2,665 by 1951. A sub-postmaster was appointed in 1853, gas was supplied from Epping in 1872, water from about 1884, a police station existed from about 1886, and electricity was laid on in 1928, the same year a branch of the county library opened.

Two "retreats" in Coppice Row, pleasure grounds serving visitors to the forest, were destroyed by German bombs during the Second World War, together with four houses opposite.

Winston Churchill, then member of parliament for the Epping division, addressed a constituency meeting in the village on 27 August 1938, warning of the worsening situation in Europe.

=== Street lighting ===
In 1963 a petition organised by residents asked Epping and Ongar Rural District Council to install electric street lamps, its organisers arguing that lighting was needed for safety; other villagers opposed it, fearing that lamps would "urbanise" Theydon Bois and spoil its character. Rival petitions for and against attracted about 600 signatures each, and a meeting of 300 residents agreed that the question should be settled by a plebiscite of the village's 1,500 electors, held in April 1964; opponents pointed to an estimated installation cost of £20,000 and argued that lamps would tempt further development. The electors rejected the proposal, and the village has remained unlit.

== The Avenue of Trees ==
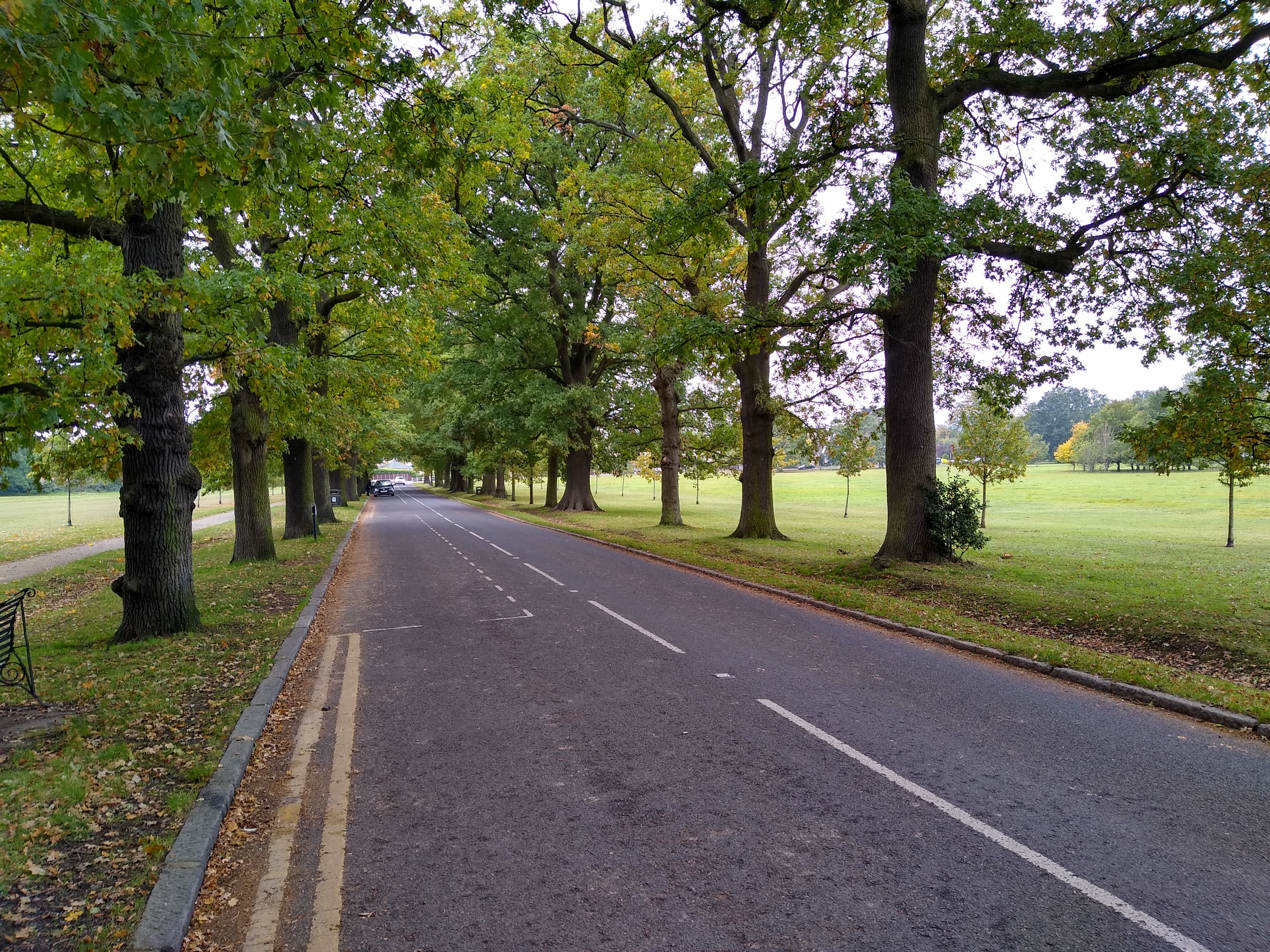
Loughton Lane

What is widely regarded as Theydon Bois' most iconic landmark is the 'Avenue of Trees' which lines Loughton Lane, one of its main roads. The oak trees were planted in the 1830s to, reputedly, celebrate the accession of Queen Victoria to the throne. Chairwoman of the City of London's Epping Forest Committee, said, “The Theydon avenue [has been] identified as the highest priority among the many other avenues of trees that the City of London currently looks after."

A survey commissioned by the City of London, the responsible authority for the Green, found that four of the trees were required to be felled and others should be monitored.

Although felling was accepted as necessary, there was local concern about the visual impact that this would have on the village. A new line of trees, therefore, was planted in late 2010, set back from the current row. The semi-mature replacements will eventually dominate the site. The TBPC chairman, Robert Glozier, said, "The Avenue of Trees is an intrinsic part of the village. It has to be preserved not just for the short term but also the long term and the best way to do this is to have a parallel Avenue of Trees to take over".

Some of the new trees have been sponsored as memorials, and details of these will be printed on an information board near the avenue.

== Events ==
Several yearly events are observed in Theydon Bois. Of most note is the annual tradition of the Donkey Derby, which is usually held in July. The 26th consecutive event was held on 14 July 2013. The Derby involves children participating in donkey racing, which can be bet on in small-stakes. Individual races or the donkeys themselves can be sponsored in advance by villagers who are then offered the right to name the race or donkey respectively. Also included in the day are rides, games, stalls, donkey rides and food and drink tents. Profits made from the Donkey Derby are raised for the Theydon Bois Scouts, although have recently begun to benefit the local Girl Guides as well. The Donkey Derby was postponed from July until September for the first time in 2012 due to bad weather, although the rescheduled event also suffered from heavy rain and wind.

Another annual tradition is the Open Gardens Day, held in the summer, at which local residents show their private gardens to visitors.

== Theydon Bois and Epping Forest ==
Theydon Bois Green

Epping Forest, an ancient woodland and former Royal Forest, borders Theydon Bois. Part of the parish lay within the royal forest, and during the 1850s the Crown negotiated the sale of its forestal rights; in 1857 R. W. H. Dare bought those over his manor for £1,353, and he and his son then inclosed more than 300 acres of forest between 1857 and 1871. Inclosure was halted by government action, and under the Epping Forest Act 1878 most of the forest land in the parish was thrown open again and placed under permanent protection. The inhabitants' ancient rights of estovers, exercised each year from 12 November to the following 23 April, were recognised by the Act and extinguished in return for compensation.

The Theydon Bois & District Rural Preservation Society was founded to preserve the rural character of the countryside in and around the village.

A listed cast-iron boundary post, one of the last remaining markers from the ring of 280 originally surrounding London, can be found in the forest on the Theydon Bois side of Epping Road.

== Governance ==
Theydon Bois is governed locally by a parish council made up of ten councillors serving four-year terms, one of whom is selected as chairman for a twelve-month term. In Parliament it is represented by the constituency of Epping Forest.

== Transport ==
Theydon Bois tube station is on the London Underground's Central line. There is currently one bus service connecting the village to Loughton, Abridge, Epping and Harlow.

== Pubs ==
The village used to have four pubs but now only has two, the Bull and the Queen Victoria. Theydons (previously The Railway Arms) and the Sixteen String Jack were closed (in 2011 and 2016, respectively) and converted to flats.

== Awards ==
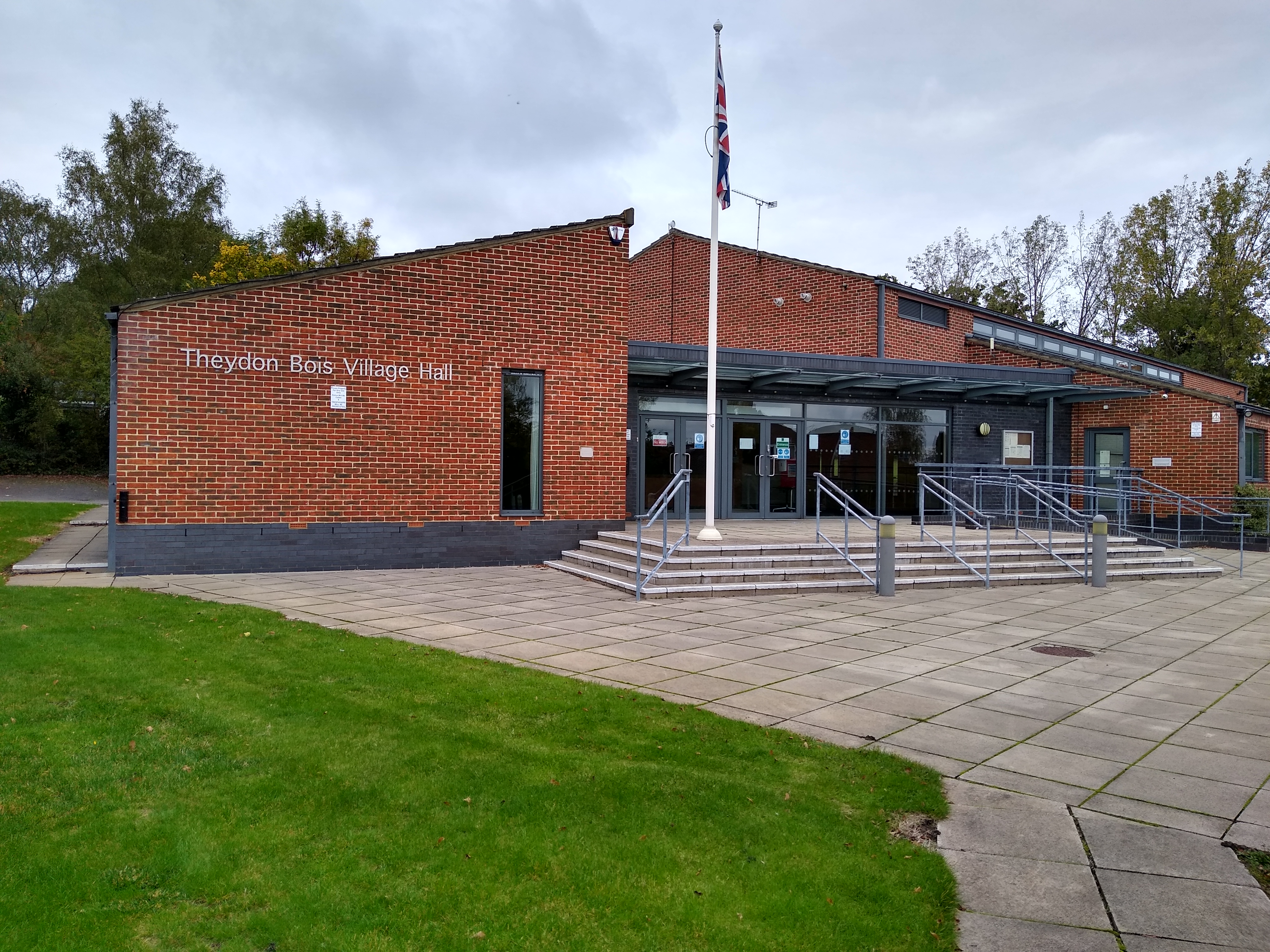
Theydon Bois Village Hall

The village won the Rural Community Council of Essex's Best Kept Village competition (Class 2) in 2004 and 2007, and was runner-up in 2010. The village magazine, Theydon Bois Village News, has won the Essex Community Magazine Awards several times, including in 2010, 2011 and 2013, and won the Essex Association of Local Councils' newsletter award in 2005 and 2007.

== Notable residents ==
- Paul Ballard, former television presenter, convicted in 2021 of rape and of causing death by dangerous driving
- James Theodore Bent (1852–1897), explorer and archaeologist, buried in the parish
- Frances Mary Buss (died 1894), pioneer of education for women, buried in the parish
- Ray Cooney, playwright and actor
- John Strype (1643–1737), ecclesiastical historian, presented to the curacy of the parish in 1669
- David Sullivan, publisher of Sport Newspapers and co-owner of West Ham United, lives at Birch Hall
- Ernest Walbourn (1872–1927), landscape painter, lived at Longworth, Piercing Hill
