= Debden tube station =

London Underground station

Debden
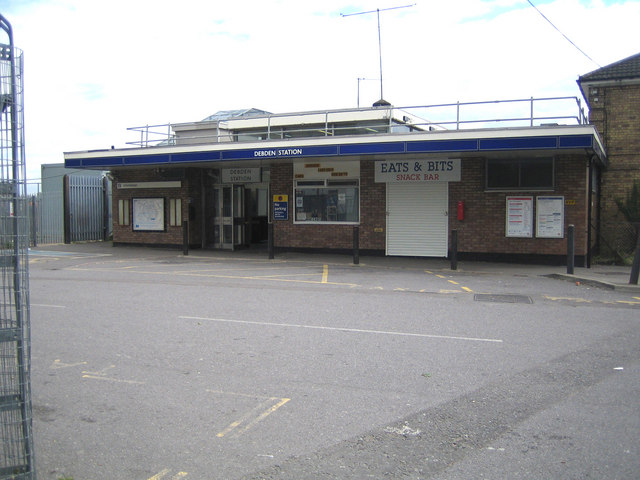
- Station entrance
- Interactive map of Debden

General information
- Location: Loughton
- Local authority: District of Epping Forest
- Managed by: London Underground
- Number of platforms: 2
- Accessible: Yes
- Fare zone: 6

London Underground annual entry and exit
- 2020: ▼1.51 million
- 2021: ▼1.11 million
- 2022: ▲1.77 million
- 2023: ▲1.84 million
- 2024: ▲1.89 million

Railway companies
- Original company: Great Eastern Railway
- Pre-grouping: Great Eastern Railway
- Post-grouping: London and North Eastern Railway

Key dates
- 24 April 1865: Opened as Chigwell Road
- 1 December 1865: Renamed Chigwell Lane
- 22 May 1916: Temporarily closed
- 3 February 1919: Reopened
- 25 September 1949: Renamed Debden; BR service replaced by Central line
- 18 April 1966: Goods yard closed

Other information
- External links: TfL station info page
- Coordinates: 51.64527°N 0.08388°E

Debden (/ˈdɛbdən/) is a London Underground station, serving the Debden area of Loughton in the Epping Forest District of Essex. It is on the Central line, between Loughton and Theydon Bois stations. The station is located in Station Approach off Chigwell Lane (A1168). It is in London fare zone 6.

== History ==
The station was originally opened on 24 April 1865 by the Great Eastern Railway as part of an extension of the railway's Loughton branch to Epping and Ongar. Initially called Chigwell Road, it was soon renamed on 1 December 1865 as Chigwell Lane, but remained a single-platform halt for the first years of its life. It was the setting for the Victorian ballad The Chigwell Stationmaster's Wife, Chigwell station not having opened until 1903.

Chigwell Lane was one of a number of GER stations that saw a temporary suspension of passenger services, due to the need to make economies during the First World War. The station was closed from 22 May 1916 until 3 February 1919. As a consequence of the Railways Act 1921, the GER was merged with other railway companies in 1923 to form part of the London & North Eastern Railway (LNER).

As part of the New Works Programme, 1935-1940, the LNER branch was transferred to London Underground, to form part of the eastern extension of the Central line. Although work commenced in 1938 it was suspended upon the outbreak of the Second World War in 1939 and work only recommenced in 1946. British Railways (BR, successor to LNER after nationalisation in 1948) steam services were replaced by electric Central line passenger services on 25 September 1949. From the handover, the station was renamed Debden. British Railways goods services continued to be operated on the branch for years afterwards.

== The station today ==
Debden station operates as an intermediate terminus for eastbound trains from central London, and a number of peak-hours trains terminate at the station rather than continuing to Epping. A turnback siding east of the station allows eastbound trains terminating at Debden to reverse direction and enter the westbound platform to return to central London. The siding may also be used in the reverse direction, allowing westbound trains from Epping to be terminated at Debden during service disruptions and return east.

At one time there were two sidings at Debden and the majority of trains terminated there with a limited service continuing to Epping. However, the Epping service has improved considerably and this has reduced the number of trains terminating at Debden. The present station buildings on the eastbound platform largely date from a reconstruction in 1974, although the original stationmaster's house survives adjacent to the ticket office.

In April 2021, Debden became the 82nd accessible station on the Underground, following the construction of two lifts and a connecting bridge to link the two platforms. Work to make the station accessible was first announced in January 2018, as part of a £200m investment plan to increase the number of accessible stations on the Tube.

== Connections ==
London Buses routes 20, 397 and 677 serve the station, as well as a number of non-Transport for London contracted buses, including routes 66, 418, 418B and 542.

Preceding station	London Underground	Following station
Loughton towards Ealing Broadway or West Ruislip	Central line	Theydon Bois towards Epping
Historical railways
Loughton; Line and station open	Great Eastern Railway; Loughton-Ongar	Theydon Bois; Line and station open
