= List of Institution of Engineering and Technology academic journals =

This is a list of journals published by Institution of Engineering and Technology (IET), including those from its predecessors Institution of Electrical Engineers (IEE) and Institution of Incorporated Engineers (IIE).

== B ==
- Biosurface and Biotribology

== C ==
- CAAI Transactions on Intelligence Technology
- CIRED - Open Access Proceedings Journal
- Chinese Journal of Electronics
- Cognitive Computation and Systems
- Communications Engineer
- Computer-Aided Engineering Journal
- Computerised Manufacturing
- Computing & Control Engineering Journal
- Computing and Control Engineering

== E ==
- Electronic Systems News
- Electronics & Communication Engineering Journal
- Electronics & Power
- Electronics Education
- Electronics Letters
- Electronics Systems and Software
- Engineering & Technology
- Engineering Biology
- Engineering Management
- Engineering Management Journal
- Engineering Science & Education Journal

== H ==
- Healthcare Technology Letters
- High Voltage

== I ==
- IEE Journal on Computers and Digital Techniques
- IEE Journal on Electric Power Applications
- IEE Journal on Electronic Circuits and Systems
- IEE Journal on Microwaves, Optics and Acoustics
- IEE Journal on Solid-State and Electron Devices
- IEE Proceedings (various sections)
- IEE Review
- IEE-IERE Proceedings India
- IET Biometrics
- IET Circuits, Devices & Systems
- IET Collaborative Intelligent Manufacturing
- IET Communications
- IET Computer Vision
- IET Computers & Digital Techniques
- IET Control Theory & Applications
- IET Cyber-Physical Systems: Theory & Applications
- IET Cyber-Systems and Robotics
- IET Electric Power Applications
- IET Electrical Systems in Transportation
- IET Energy Systems Integration
- IET Generation, Transmission & Distribution
- IET Image Processing
- IET Information Security
- IET Intelligent Transport Systems
- IET Microwaves, Antennas & Propagation
- IET Nanobiotechnology
- IET Nanodielectrics
- IET Networks
- IET Optoelectronics
- IET Power Electronics
- IET Radar, Sonar & Navigation
- IET Renewable Power Generation
- IET Science, Measurement & Technology
- IET Signal Processing
- IET Smart Cities
- IET Smart Grid
- IET Software
- IET Synthetic Biology
- IET Systems Biology
- IET Wireless Sensor Systems
- Information Professional
- Institution of Electrical Engineers - Proceedings of the Wireless Section of the Institution
- Institution of Production Engineers Journal
- Intelligent Systems Engineering

== J ==
- Journal of Engineering
- Journal of the British Institution of Radio Engineers
- Journal of the IEE
- Journal of the Institution of Electrical Engineers (various sections)
- Journal of the Institution of Electronic and Radio Engineers
- Journal of the Institution of Production Engineers
- Journal of the Society of Telegraph Engineers
- Journal of the Society of Telegraph Engineers and of Electricians

== M ==
- Manufacturing Engineer
- Micro & Nano Letters

== P ==
- Power Engineer
- Power Engineering Journal
- Proceedings of the British Institution of Radio Engineers
- Proceedings of the IEE (various sections)
- Proceedings of the Indian Division of the British Institution of Radio Engineers
- Proceedings of the Indian Division of the Institution of Electronic and Radio Engineers
- Proceedings of the Institution of Electrical Engineers
- Proceedings of the Institution of Electronic and Radio Engineers
- Production Engineer

== R ==
- Radio and Electronic Engineer

== S ==
- Science Abstracts
- Software & Microsystems
- Software Engineering Journal
- Students' Quarterly Journal
- Systems Biology

== W ==
- Wiring Installations and Supplies
- The Woman Engineer
