= Proceedings of the Institution of Electrical Engineers =

- Discipline: Electrical engineering
- Language: English

Publication details
- Former names: Journal of the Society of Telegraph Engineers; Journal of the Society of Telegraph Engineers and of Electricians; Journal of the Society of Telegraph-Engineers and Electricians; Journal of the Institution of Electrical Engineers; From 1926 to 1940, a new journal was started: Institution of Electrical Engineers - Proceedings of the Wireless Section of the Institution; Proceedings of the IEE; Proceedings of the Institution of Electrical Engineers; IEE Proceedings
- History: 1872–2006
- Publisher: Institution of Electrical Engineers

Standard abbreviations
- ISO 4: Proc. Inst. Electr. Eng.

Indexing
- ISSN: 0020-3270 (print); 2053-7891 (web)

Links
- Journal homepage

Proceedings of the Institution of Electrical Engineers was a series journals which published the proceedings of the Institution of Electrical Engineers. It was originally established as the Journal of the Society of Telegraph Engineers in 1872, and was known under several titles over the years, such as Journal of the Institution of Electrical Engineers, Proceedings of the IEE and IEE Proceedings.

== History ==
The journal was originally established in 1872, as

- Journal of the Society of Telegraph Engineers (1872–1880)

Then underwent a series of name changes

- Journal of the Society of Telegraph Engineers and of Electricians (1881–1882)
- Journal of the Society of Telegraph-Engineers and Electricians (1883–1888)

Until in 1889 it settled into

- Journal of the Institution of Electrical Engineers (1889–1940)

The journal remained under that name for over 50 years.

From 1926 to 1940, a new journal was started

- Institution of Electrical Engineers - Proceedings of the Wireless Section of the Institution (1926–1940)

In 1941, the journals were reorganized in distinct parts. From 1941 to 1948 those were

- Journal of the Institution of Electrical Engineers - Part I: General
- Journal of the Institution of Electrical Engineers - Part II: Power Engineering
- Journal of the Institution of Electrical Engineers - Part IIA: Automatic Regulators and Servo Mechanisms
- Journal of the Institution of Electrical Engineers - Part III: Communication Engineering
- Journal of the Institution of Electrical Engineers - Part III: Radio and Communication Engineering
- Journal of the Institution of Electrical Engineers - Part IIIA: Radiocommunication
- Journal of the Institution of Electrical Engineers - Part IIIA: Radiolocation

In 1949, until 1954, the publications were reorganized into

- Journal of the Institution of Electrical Engineers

and

- Proceedings of the IEE - Part I: General
- Proceedings of the IEE - Part IA: Electric Railway Traction
- Proceedings of the IEE - Part II: Power Engineering
- Proceedings of the IEE - Part IIA: Insulating Materials
- Proceedings of the IEE - Part III: Radio and Communication Engineering
- Proceedings of the IEE - Part IIIA: Television
- Proceedings of the IEE - Part IV: Institution Monographs

Which in 1955 were renamed

- Journal of the IEE (1955–1963)

and

- Proceedings of the IEE - Part A: Power Engineering
- Proceedings of the IEE - Part B: Electronic and Communication Engineering
- Proceedings of the IEE - Part B: Radio and Electronic Engineering
- Proceedings of the IEE - Part C: Monographs

These merged into a single journal in 1963, which remained until 1979.

- Proceedings of the Institution of Electrical Engineers (1963–1979)

In 1964, Journal of the IEE became

- Electronics & Power (1964–1987)

which in 1988 became

- IEE Review (1988–2006)

The proceedings were renamed in 1980 as IEE Proceedings. From 1980 until 1993, the IEE Proceedings had lettered parts

- IEE Proceedings A (Physical Science, Measurement and Instrumentation, Management and Education)
- IEE Proceedings A (Physical Science, Measurement and Instrumentation, Management and Education, Reviews)
- IEE Proceedings A (Science, Measurement and Technology)
- IEE Proceedings B (Electric Power Applications)
- IEE Proceedings C (Generation, Transmission and Distribution)
- IEE Proceedings D (Control Theory and Applications)
- IEE Proceedings E (Computers and Digital Techniques)
- IEE Proceedings F (Communications, Radar and Signal Processing)
- IEE Proceedings F (Radar and Signal Processing)
- IEE Proceedings G (Circuits, Devices and Systems)
- IEE Proceedings G (Electronic Circuits and Systems)
- IEE Proceedings H (Microwaves, Antennas and Propagation)
- IEE Proceedings H (Microwaves, Optics and Antennas)
- IEE Proceedings I (Communications, Speech and Vision)
- IEE Proceedings I (Solid-State and Electron Devices)
- IEE Proceedings J (Optoelectronics)

and were reorganized in 1994 until 2006

- IEE Proceedings - Circuits, Devices and Systems
- IEE Proceedings - Communications
- IEE Proceedings - Computers and Digital Techniques
- IEE Proceedings - Control Theory and Applications
- IEE Proceedings - Electric Power Applications
- IEE Proceedings - Generation, Transmission and Distribution
- IEE Proceedings - Information Security
- IEE Proceedings - Intelligent Transport Systems
- IEE Proceedings - Microwaves, Antennas and Propagation
- IEE Proceedings - Nanobiotechnology
- IEE Proceedings - Optoelectronics
- IEE Proceedings - Radar, Sonar and Navigation
- IEE Proceedings - Science, Measurement and Technology
- IEE Proceedings - Software
- IEE Proceedings - Systems Biology
- IEE Proceedings - Vision, Image and Signal Processing

After 2006, the IEE merged with the Institution of Incorporated Engineers (IIE) to form the Institution of Engineering and Technology (IET), and its journals were reorganized into various IET publications.
