= Zhang Fangguo =

Zhang Fangguo is an associate professor at the Department of Electronics and Communication Engineering of the School of Information Science and Technology at Sun Yat-sen University in P.R. China. His main research interests include Pairings Based Cryptosystems, Elliptic Curve and Hyperelliptic Curve Cryptography, Provable Security and Design and Analysis of New Public Key Cryptosystems.

His main contributions include ID-based ring signature schemes (joint work with Kwangjo Kim) - Asiacrypt 2003, short signature schemes (joint work with Rei Safavi-Naini and Willy Susilo) - PKC 2004 and ID-based short signature schemes (joint work with Willy Susilo and Yi Mu) - Financial Cryptography 2005, and restrictive partial blind signature schemes (joint work with Xiaofeng Chen, Yi Mu and Willy Susilo) - Financial Cryptography 2006.
