= Journal of Engineering =

Journal of Engineering may refer to:

- Journal of Engineering (IET journal), abbreviated J. Eng. (Stevenage), published by the Institution of Engineering and Technology
- Journal of Engineering (Hindawi journal), published by Hindawi
- Journal of Engineering, published by the College of Engineering of the University of Baghdad
