= London Underground 2009 Stock =

Trains used by the London Underground

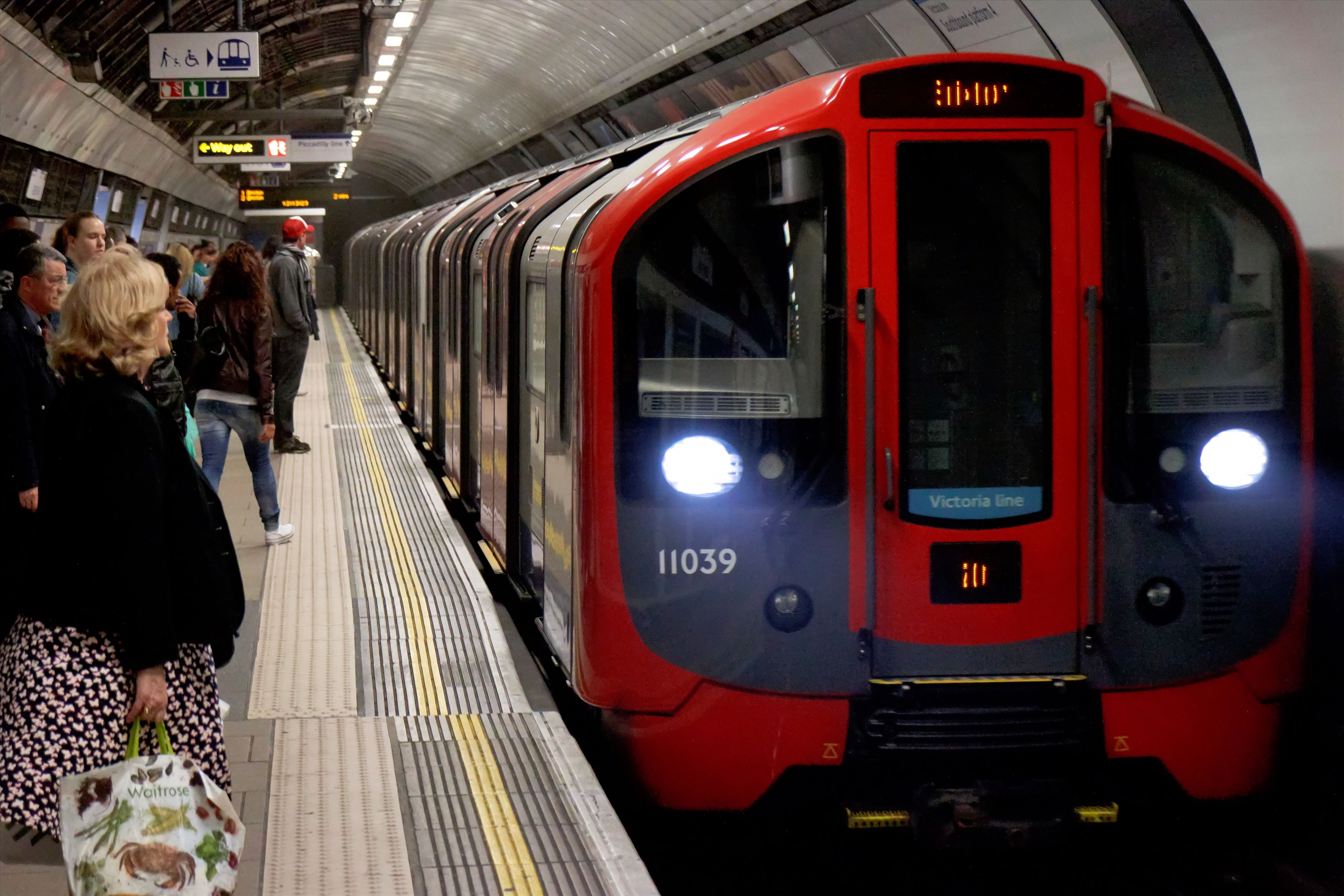
- 2009 Stock train at Green Park in 2011

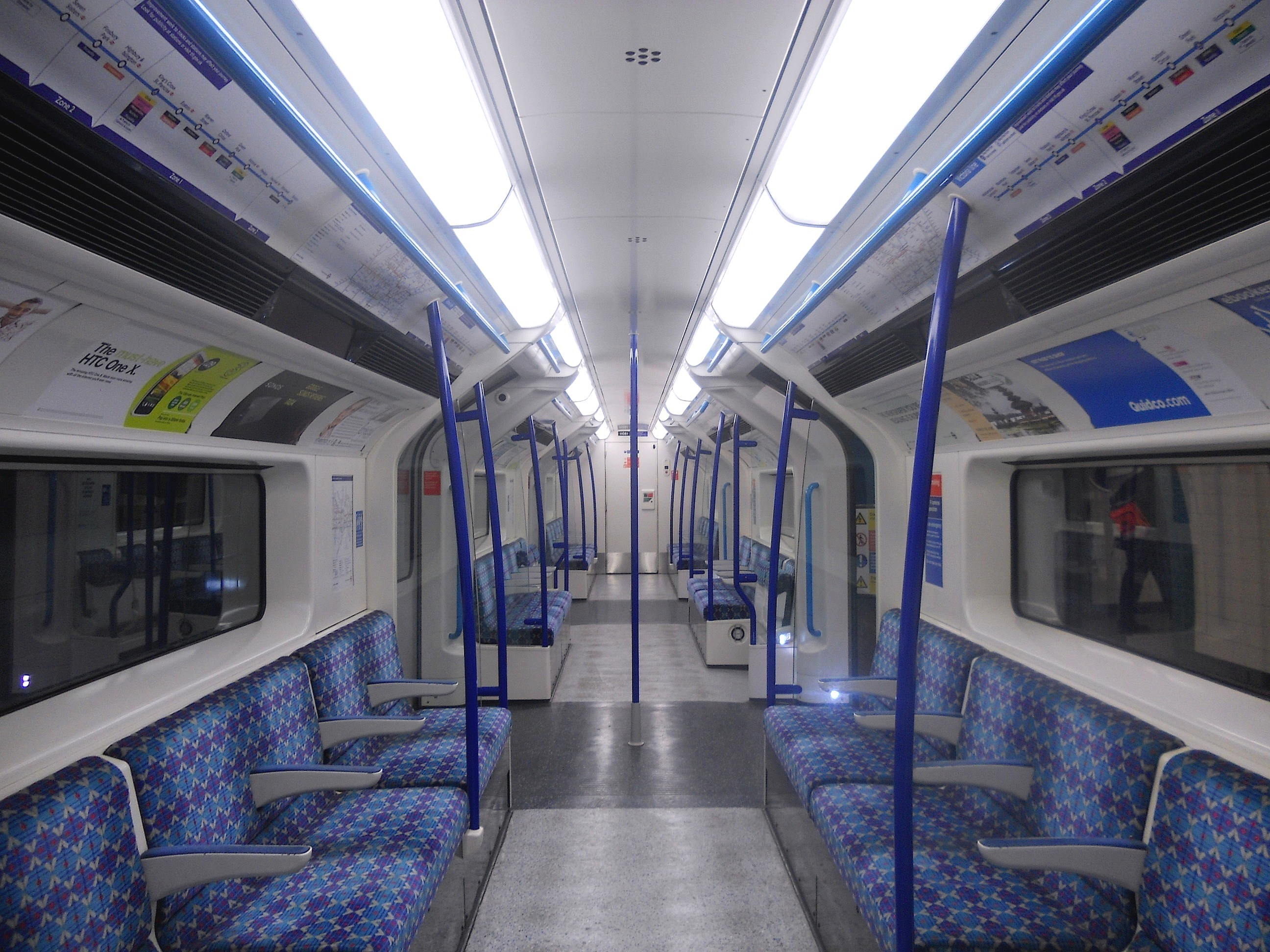
- The interior of a 2009 Stock car
- Stock type: Deep-level tube
- In service: 21 July 2009 – present
- Manufacturer: Bombardier Transportation
- Built at: Derby Litchurch Lane Works
- Family name: Movia 248
- Replaced: 1967 Stock
- Constructed: 2007–2011
- Number built: 376 cars (47 trains)
- Formation: 8 cars per train
- Fleet numbers: 001/002 – 093/094
- Capacity: 1,128 per train (252 seated, 876 standing at 6 people/m^{2})
- Depot: Northumberland Park
- Line served: Victoria

Specifications
- Train length: 133.275 m (437 ft 3.0 in)
- Car length: 16.8825 m (55 ft 4.67 in) (trailing cars); 16.585 m (54 ft 5.0 in) (all others)
- Width: 2.68 m (8 ft 10 in)
- Height: 2.883 m (9 ft 5.5 in)
- Wheel diameter: 740 mm (29 in) (new)
- Wheelbase: 2.05 m (6 ft 9 in)
- Maximum speed: 80 km/h (50 mph)
- Weight: 197.3 tonnes (194.2 long tons; 217.5 short tons) when empty
- Traction system: Bombardier MITRAC DR1000 IGBT–VVVF
- Traction motors: 24 × 75 kW (101 hp) 3-phase AC induction motor
- Acceleration: 1.3 m/s^{2} (4.3 ft/s^{2})
- Deceleration: 1.14 m/s^{2} (3.7 ft/s^{2}) (service); 1.4 m/s^{2} (4.6 ft/s^{2}) (emergency)
- Electric systems: Fourth rail, 630 V DC
- Current collection: Contact shoe
- Bogies: Bombardier FLEXX Metro 1200 VLU
- Safety system: Distance To Go-Radio (DTG-R)

The London Underground 2009 Stock is a type of London Underground train built by Bombardier as part of its Movia family at its Derby Litchurch Lane Works, England. A total of 47 eight-car trains have been built for the Victoria line. They entered service between July 2009 and June 2011 and replaced the 1967 Tube Stock. It is the first new deep level tube stock on the Underground network since the 1996 Stock entered service on the Jubilee line in 1997, and as of 2026, remains the newest deep level tube stock in current service.

== Background ==
The Victoria line is the most intensively used line on the Underground, in terms of the average number of journeys per kilometre. In the early 2000s, the reliability of service on the line was decreasing due to the age of the 1960s-era Automatic Train Operation (ATO) system, and the 1967 Stock used on the line.

Following the implementation of the London Underground Public Private Partnership in 2003, the Metronet consortium responsible for the infrastructure on the Victoria line began work on a substantial upgrade of the line. As part of the consortium, Bombardier Transportation would design, build and maintain the new rolling stock.

In the 1990s, London Underground designed an open gangway "Space Train" with walk through carriages to increase capacity in the deep level tube. However, due to the technical risk and financial risk of not meeting the PPP contract requirements, Metronet ordered conventional trains from Bombardier in 2003, which were originally planned to enter service in 2006 at a cost of £750 million.

=== Design and pre-production delays ===
The design of the trains was finalised in September 2004. Manufacture of two pre-production trains began in early 2005, with the first scheduled to be completed by mid-2006. In February 2006, Metronet announced that the first of the pre-production cars had been completed in preparation for static testing. From 21 July to 4 August 2006, a mock-up of the train was on show at Euston Square Gardens, near Euston Square station, for a customer acceptance test followed by public display.

From September 2006, the first pre-production train underwent testing at Bombardier's manufacturing and test site at Derby Litchurch Lane Works. Delays meant that the first pre-production train was not delivered to London until May 2007. Testing, training and familiarisation work could then begin. Throughout the late 2000s, installation and testing of the new "Distance to Go" signalling system for the new trains was being installed on the existing line.

Metronet, the private consortium responsible for the infrastructure on the Victoria line, collapsed in July 2007 due to financial difficulties. Following negotiations with Bombardier, Transport for London took ownership of Metronet in May 2008, allowing for the upgrade to continue.

=== Production and introduction into service ===
The second pre-production train was expected to begin trial running in full passenger service in July 2008. This date slipped twice, first to January 2009 and then to July 2009. The train entered service on 21 July 2009, leaving Northumberland Park depot at 23:00 and forming the 23:55 service between Seven Sisters and Brixton.

Main production at Derby Litchurch Lane Works commenced at the end of 2009. One train entered passenger service every two weeks from February 2010. By mid-2011, there was a sufficient number of trains in service to allow the withdrawal of the few remaining 1967 Stock trains, the last of which ran on 30 June 2011. By July 2011, the full fleet of 2009 Stock trains were in service.

==== Issues during introduction to service ====
During the introduction of the trains, various teething issues with the new trains caused disruption on the line. During the morning rush hour on 21 July 2010, a train broke down at Pimlico, and ambulances had to be called in to rescue almost 3,000 trapped passengers. Five days later, on 26 July 2010, another morning rush-hour train broke down at Oxford Circus, causing all Victoria line services to be temporarily suspended. Transport for London cited software failures and over-sensitive door sensors as the main causes of both problems. Subsequent analysis has used the analogy of the bathtub curve to explain the large number of early issues with the trains.

=== Most frequent service in UK ===
By the mid 2010s, the trains and signalling system were displaying exceptional levels of reliability, with the 2009 Stock travelling around six times further between failures than the 1967 Stock. A subsequent series of upgrades to the signalling system and track work allowed for an increase to frequency of service to up to 36 trains per hour, the most frequent in the UK and one of the most frequent in Europe. This was assisted by Metronet having ordered a larger train fleet than required.

== Features ==
Built as part of the Victoria line upgrade in conjunction with new signalling, the trains were designed to decrease journey times, improve reliability to minimise long term maintenance costs, as well as increase passenger capacity per train.

Compared to the 1967 Stock they replaced, the train has improved acceleration and have the same top speed of 80 km/h (50 mph). Braking performance is improved through the use of regenerative brakes, which save energy. Originally intended to have all-motored axles to achieve targeted running times (as in the 1992 Stock), it was later decided that 75% of motored axles would be sufficient to achieve the targeted improved acceleration and higher top speed.

This reduction saved weight, as well as reducing project costs by around £10 million, about 3.5% of the overall cost. Overall, the new train allows for a decrease in journey times in between stations by 8% and overall journey times by 16%. At peak times, 43 trains should be in service, an increase of six over the 1967 Stock.

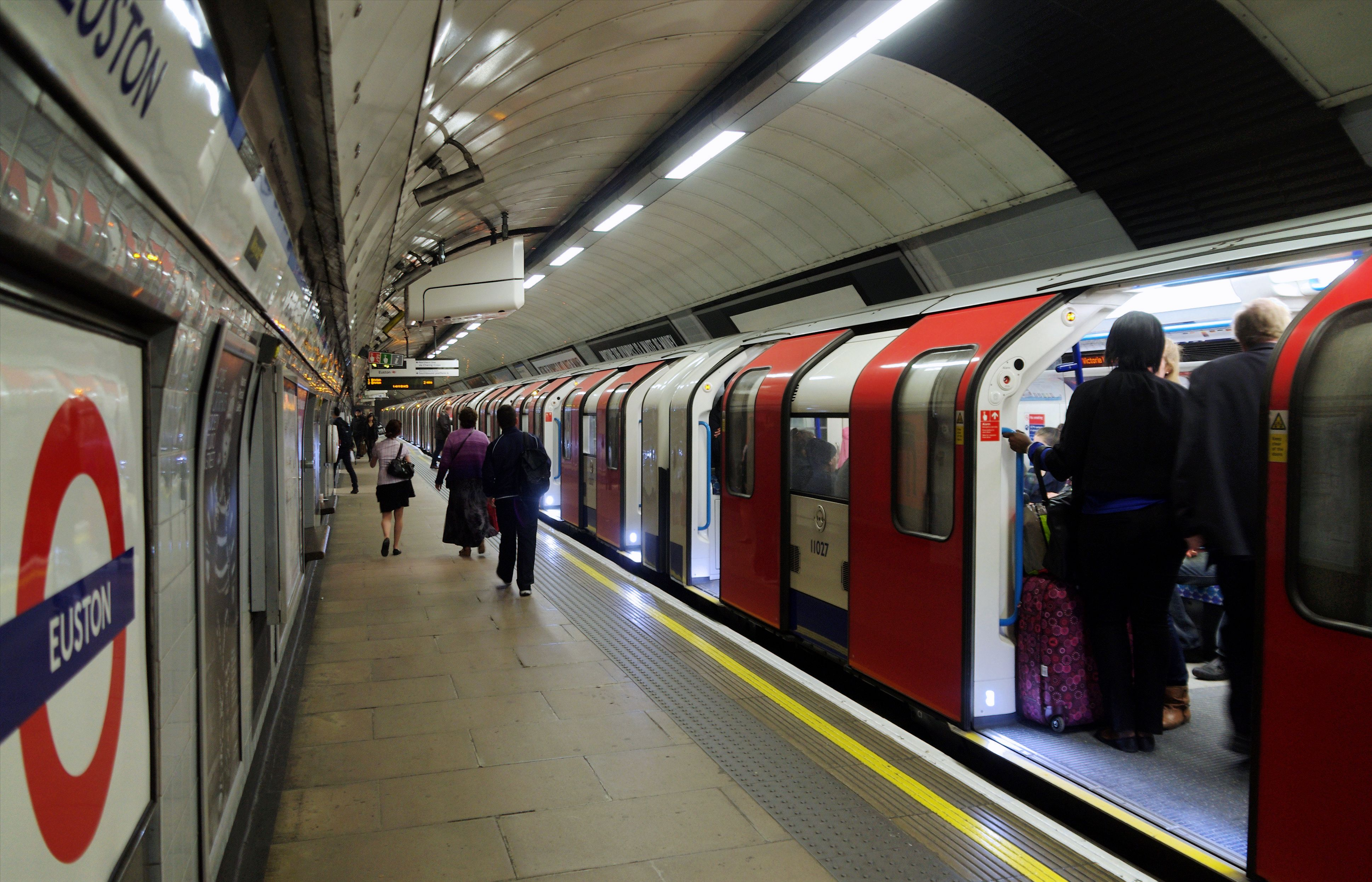
An exterior view of a carriage at Euston

The trains are 40 mm (1.57 in) wider than the 1967 Stock to take advantage of the Victoria line's loading gauge, which is slightly larger than those of other deep-level tube lines. This, however, prevents them from leaving the Victoria line, except by road. The trains were the longest deep-level tube trains on the system when introduced, at 133.275 m (437 ft 3 in), 3 m (9 ft 10 in) longer than the 1967 Stock.

The trains were built using Bombardier's FICAS technology, giving a thinner bodyshell and more internal space for passengers. Overall, the train has a 19% increase in capacity over the 1967 Stock, seating 252 and with standing space for an estimated 1,196 passengers. The electrically powered train doors are wider for easier and faster boarding and alighting of passengers in order to reduce dwell times in stations.

They are the first London Underground trains to be designed since the Rail Vehicle Accessibility Regulations were introduced, so they have more facilities for people with impaired mobility, including multi-purpose areas with tip-up seats and space for wheelchairs and pushchairs, and offset centre door poles for wheelchair access. They have CCTV cameras and dot-matrix displays to show real-time service information. The train maintains a fixed height above the rail for ease of access, regardless of the loading of the train and extent of wheel wear.

Unlike most other London Underground trains, they have their Combined Traction/Brake Controller, driver's manual controls, often called "dead man's handle" on the right-hand side of the cab, as most of the platforms on the Victoria line are on the right. Access to the cab for driver changes is easier than on the 1967 Stock: an external side door is fitted, whereas the cab in the 1967 Stock had to be accessed through the passenger compartment, which could be difficult at rush hour. The cab is fitted with dedicated air-conditioning.

Each train is made up of two 4-car units of the configuration Driving Motor–Trailer–Non Driving Motor–Uncoupling (Shunting) Non Driving Motor, which are coupled back-to-back. They have mechanical-only Scharfenberg couplers. The trains are maintained at the Victoria line's Northumberland Park Depot, with Bombardier staff on site for warranty parts replacement.

== Roster ==
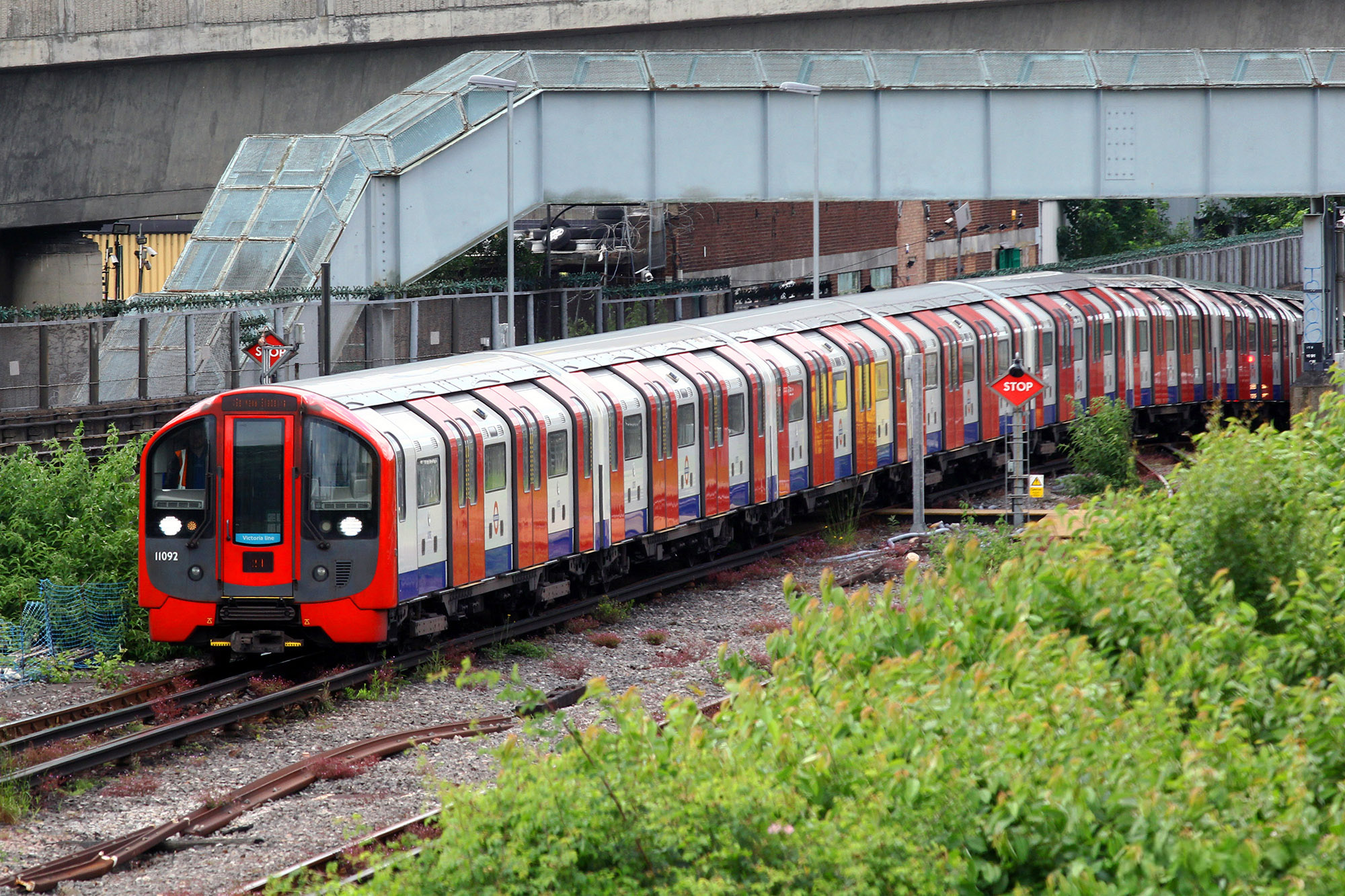
A 2009 Tube Stock train at the Northumberland Park Depot

Individual cars of the 2009 Stock have a five-digit number. The second digit identifies the role of car and the last three digits identify the set number (Numbers 001 to 094). 'A' end units have odd numbers while 'D' end units have even. The numbering system of the 2009 stock upon introduction is as follows:

	← Brixton (A) Walthamstow Central (D) →							
Formation	11xxx (DM)	12xxx (T)	13xxx (NDM)	14xxx (UNDM)	14xxx (UNDM)	13xxx (NDM)	12xxx (T)	11xxx (DM)
Facilities				Wheelchair spaces	Wheelchair spaces			
Numbers	11001 ∥ 11093	12001 ∥ 12093	13001 ∥ 13093	14001 ∥ 14093	14002 ∥ 14094	13002 ∥ 13094	12002 ∥ 12094	11002 ∥ 11094

- – Wheelchair spaces
- DM – Driving Motor car
- T – Trailer (non-powered) car
- NDM – Non-Driving Motor car
- UNDM – Uncoupling Non-Driving Motor car

== See also ==
- Circle, District, Hammersmith & City and Metropolitan lines S Stock, also part of Bombardier's Movia family
