= Pimlico Station =

Pimlico station could refer to one of a number of stations serving the Pimlico area of central London:

- Pimlico tube station
- Pimlico railway station, an early mainline terminus, south of the Thames, open 1858–1860
- Grosvenor Road railway station, a mainline station in Pimlico, open 1867–1911
