= Yi Mu =

Yi Mu is a name borne by several Korean people:

- Yi Mu (early Joseon) (1355–1409), a scholar-official of the early Joseon Dynasty
- Yi Mu (mid-Joseon) (1621–1703), a scholar-official of the middle Joseon Dynasty also known by his art name Nakgye
- Yi Mu (academic), a professor in Australia
