= Reihaneh Safavi-Naini =

Computer scientist

- ريحانه صفوی نائينی
- Born: Iran
- Other name: Rei Safavi-Naini
- Education: BSc & MSc: University of Tehran; PhD: University of Waterloo
- Scientific career
- Institutions: University of Wollongong, University of Calgary
- Thesis: Error Correcting Codes, Combinatorial Designs and Weighted Majority Decoding (1978)
- Doctoral advisor: Ian F. Blake
- Doctoral students: Willy Susilo
- Website: pages.cpsc.ucalgary.ca/~rei/

Reihaneh "Rei" Safavi-Naini (Persian: ريحانه صفوی نائينی) is the NSERC/Telus Industrial Research Chair and the Alberta Innovates Strategic Chair in Information Security at the University of Calgary, Canada.

== Education ==
Reihaneh received her PhD in Electrical and Computer Engineering from the University of Waterloo, Canada, under supervision of Prof. Ian F. Blake. She obtained her BSc and MSc in Electrical Engineering from the University of Tehran.

== Career ==
Before joining the University of Calgary in 2007, she was a Professor of Computer Science, Faculty of Informatics and the Director of Telecommunication and Information Technology Research Institute (TITR) and Centre for Information Security at the University of Wollongong, Australia.

She is the co-founder of the Institute for Security, Privacy and Information Assurance and served as its director until December 2018. She is currently leading the Information Security Lab (formerly known as the iCORE Information Security Lab) at the University of Calgary.

She has served as the program co-chair of CRYPTO, ASIACRYPT, ASIACCS and Financial Cryptography and as a program committee member of major conferences in cryptology and information security. She has also served as the Associate Editor of IEEE Transactions on Information Theory, IEEE Transactions on Dependable and Secure Computing, and Transactions on Information and System Security (TISSEC), and is currently an Associate Editor of IET Information Security and Journal of Mathematical Cryptology. In 2023 she was elected a fellow of the International Association for Cryptologic Research.

=== Publications ===
Her research interest is in cryptography and information theory and their applications to information security systems. She has published over 500 papers, including:

- Scalable fragile watermarking for image authentication. (2013) Angela Piper, and Safavi-Naini Reihaneh. IET Information Security.
- An efficient signature scheme from bilinear pairings and its applications. (2004) Fangguo Zhang, Reihaneh Safavi-Naini, Willy Susilo. Lecture Notes in Computer Science.
- Digital rights management for content distribution. (2003) Qiong Liu, Reihaneh Safavi-Naini, Nicholas Paul Sheppard. Proceedings of the Australasian information security workshop conference on ACSW frontiers.

== See also ==
- List of University of Waterloo people
- Zhang Fangguo, a collaborator on short signature schemes
