= Charles Babbage Premium =

Institution of Electronic and Radio Engineers award

The Charles Babbage Premium was an annual award "for an outstanding paper on the design or use of electronic computers".

The award was established in 1959. It was initiated by the British Institution of Radio Engineers, which became the Institution of Electronic and Radio Engineers. In 1988, it merged with the Institution of Electrical Engineers (IEE), which later became the Institution of Engineering and Technology (IET) in 2006. Winners have been announced in journals such as Nuclear Power, Electronic Engineering, British Communications and Electronics, and the Software Engineering Journal.

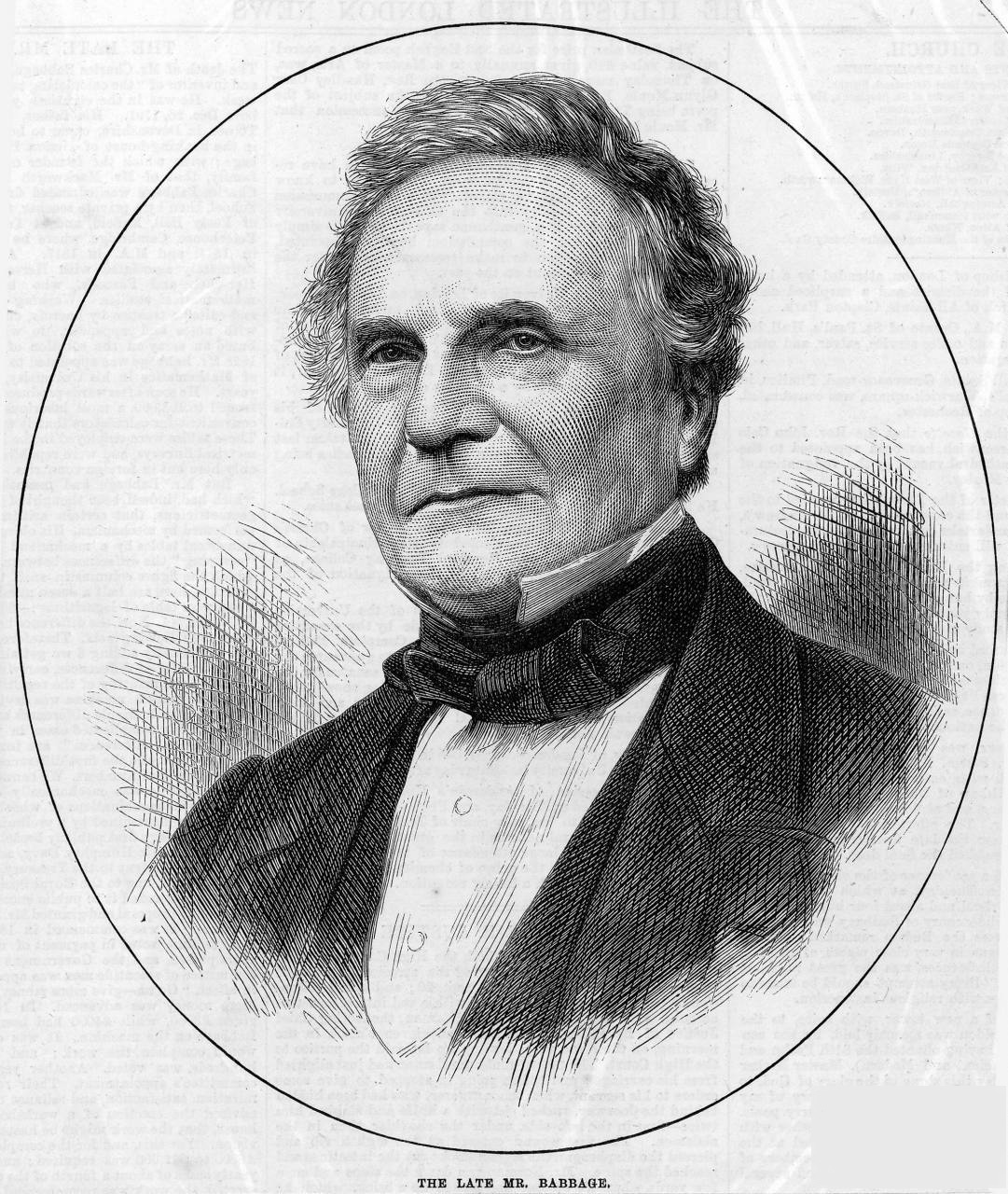
Charles Babbage, after whom the award is named

The Premium was named after the mathematician Charles Babbage FRS (1791–1871), inventor of the Analytical Engine, a design for an early mechanical computer.

The IET now makes separate Premium Awards for papers in each of its journals, named after the journal itself. This includes the IET Software Premium Award, the nearest equivalent to the Charles Babbage Premium Award.
