= Alstom Movia =

Family of metro train cars built by Bombardier Transportation and later by Alstom

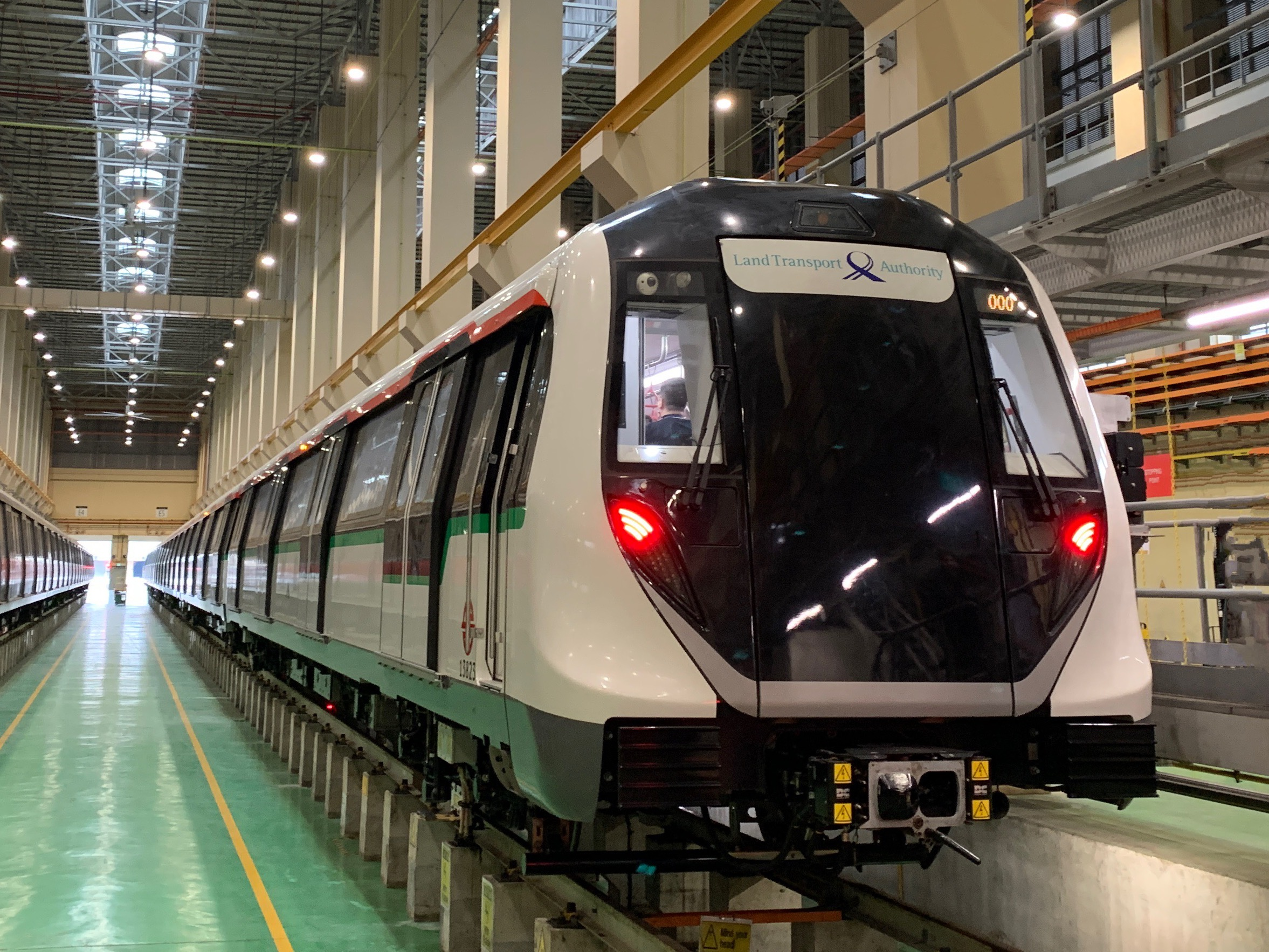
- Alstom Movia R151 train at Tuas Depot in use on the Singapore Mass Rapid Transit (SMRT)
- Stock type: Electric multiple unit
- In service: 1998–present
- Manufacturers: Bombardier Transportation, Alstom (2021–)
- Designer: Adtranz
- Family name: Movia
- Constructed: 1997–present
- Successor: Alstom Metropolis

Specifications
- Traction system: IGBT– or SiC–VVVF
- Traction motors: 3-phase AC induction motor or permanent-magnet synchronous motor
- Electric systems: OHLE: 1,500 V DC–25 kV 50 Hz AC; Third rail: 600–1,000 V DC; Fourth rail: 630–750 V DC
- Current collection: OHLE: Pantograph; Third and fourth rail: Contact shoe
- Bogies: FLEXX Metro 1000 (Note: London Underground); FLEXX Metro 2000 (Note: Bucharest Metro, Stockholm Metro C20, Toronto subway); FLEXX Metro 3000 (Note: Most trains); FLEXX Eco (Note: Stockholm Metro C30)
- Track gauge: 1,432 mm (4 ft 8 3/8 in) (Bucharest Metro); 1,435 mm (4 ft 8 1/2 in) (most trains); 4 ft 10 7/8 in (1,495 mm) (Toronto subway); 5 ft 6 in (1,676 mm) (Bay Area Rapid Transit, Delhi Metro)

The Alstom Movia (introduced as the Adtranz Movia and later sold as the Bombardier Movia) is a family of metro train cars designed by Adtranz and later built by Bombardier Transportation and Alstom. The structure and body shell are fully customisable for the needs of each system that orders it. Unlike most traditional metro trains, they usually have full-width gangways between carriages, allowing passengers to walk the entire length of the train. The design was developed by Adtranz, which was acquired by Bombardier in 2001. Since Alstom's acquisition of Bombardier in 2021, Alstom will be responsible for construction and delivery of future Movia metro train cars.

Guangzhou Metro (Lines 1 and 8), Shanghai Metro (Line 9), and Shenzhen Metro (Line 1) all use Movia 456 trains, while Bucharest Metro (Line M1, M3, M5) use the Movia 346. Movia tube and sub-surface stock are in service on the London Underground (designated S Stock on the Circle, District, Hammersmith & City and Metropolitan lines and 2009 Stock on the Victoria line), Toronto subway (designated Toronto Rocket on Line 1 Yonge–University and Line 4 Sheppard), and Delhi Metro (Phase II only). Singapore MRT's North South and East West lines ordered 106 R151 Movia trains, one of the largest orders in Singapore.

== Design ==
The Movia is designed around a modular approach, which allows it to be adapted for use across a broad range of applications. While developed as a standardised platform, both the structure and carriage bodies of the train are able to be extensively modified to conform with the varied requirements of a given operator. Reportedly, the Movia can be modified to better suit local operational conditions, while the train's steering and management system is easily accessible for periodic maintenance. Reduced operating costs have been achieved via the careful designing of the train carriages to readily facilitate access for maintenance and repairs, as well as for low lifecycle costs and with concern for environmental conditions.

The Movia incorporates either a stainless steel or aluminium body, and an innovative propulsion system. Each carriage is outfitted with relatively modern passenger information systems and closed-circuit television (CCTV) systems. They feature modern interiors and exterior design; for favourable accessibility, they are normally furnished with both wide doors and spacious gangways. The carriages are also outfitted to provide relatively low interior noise levels, resulting in an improved environment for passengers.

The Movia train is powered by an advanced propulsion system, which is credited with achieving relatively low energy consumption, known as the MITrac (Modular Integrated Traction system). This propulsion and control system is capable of vehicles using 600 V–3 kV DC, 15–25 kV AC and diesel electric propulsion. In a typical configuration, the train is capable of achieving a maximum operational speed of 85 km/h (53 mph). Each carriage is outfitted with FLEXX Metro 1000, FLEXX Metro 2000, FLEXX Metro 3000 or FLEXX Eco lightweight bogies, which reportedly enable optimum usage of vehicle capacity with less energy consumption. Other features of note include strong steering performance.

== Operators ==
=== Canada ===
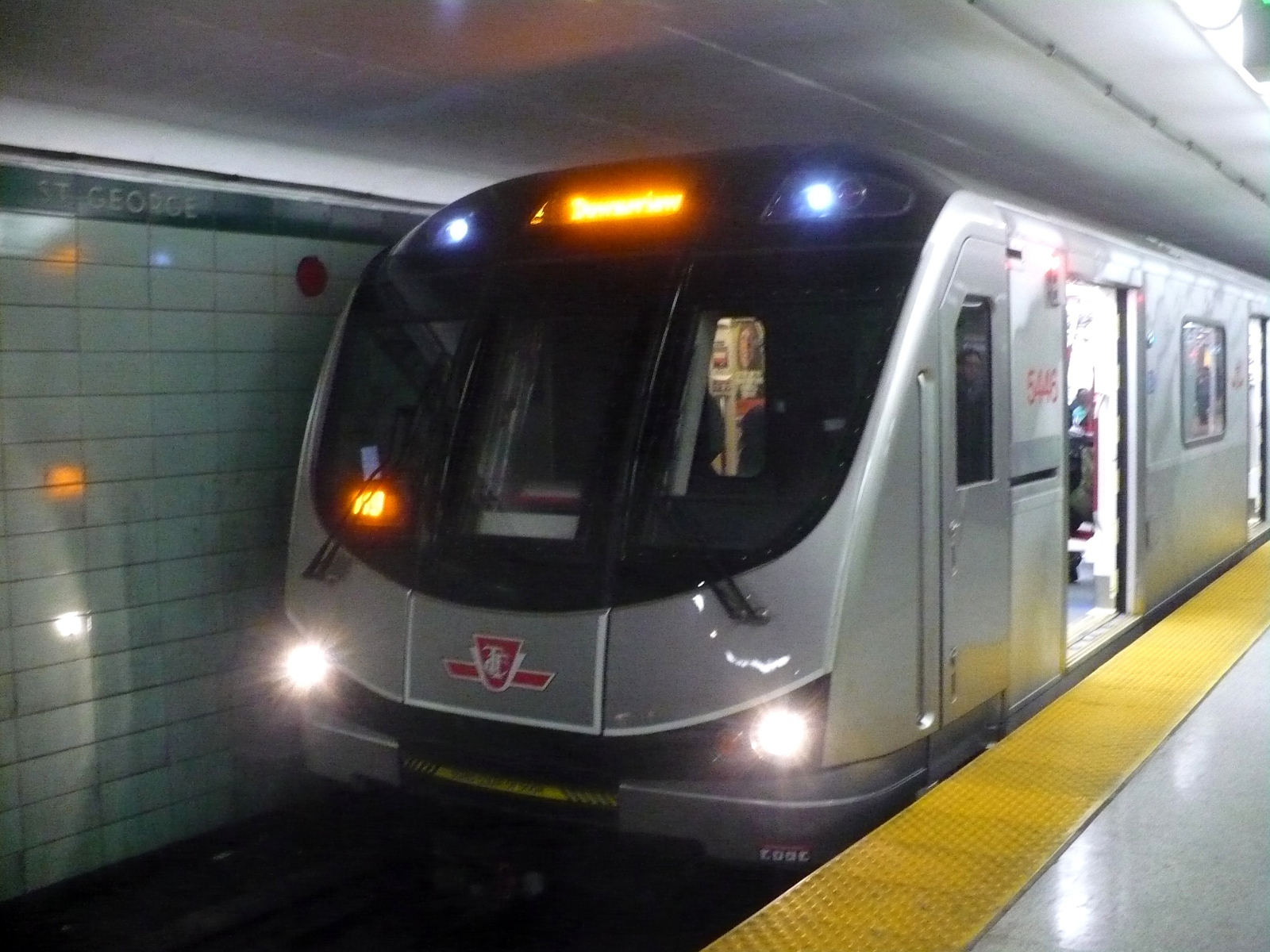
TTC Toronto Rocket Movia

- Toronto Transit Commission (Toronto subway)
  - 80 six-car trains (480 cars in total) on the Yonge–University and Sheppard lines: delivery began in October 2010 and the first train entered revenue service on July 21, 2011

=== China ===
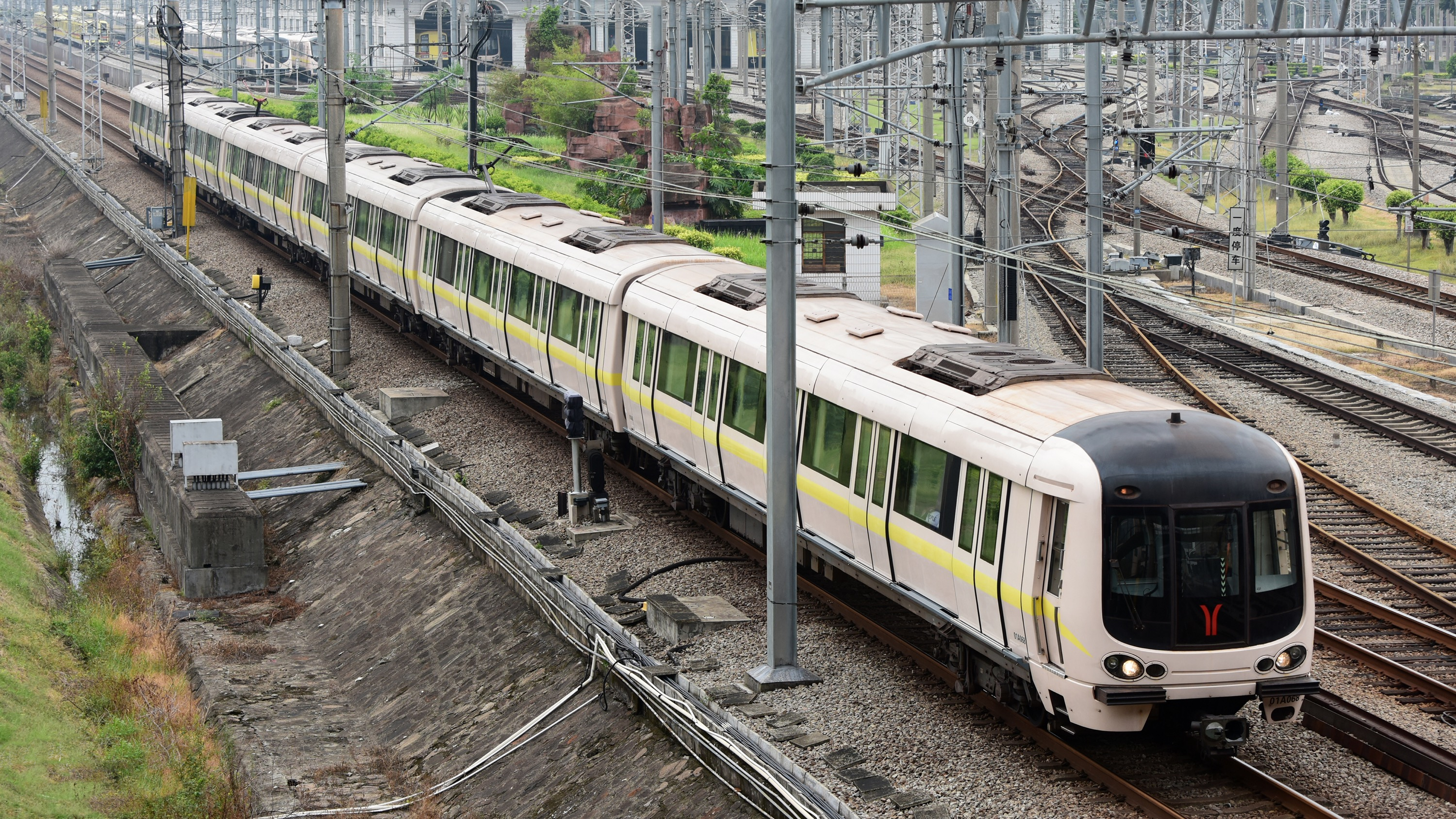
Bombardier Movia 456, used on the Guangzhou Metro

- Guangzhou Metro Alstom Movia 456 – 34 six-car units (204 cars) delivered 2002-2005 and 2006.
- Shanghai Metro – 134 six-car units (804 cars).
- Shenzhen Metro – 22 six-car units (132 cars).

=== India ===
- Delhi Metro
  - 77 eight-car trains (616 cars) – Phase II (58 sets in service)
- Kanpur Metro
  - 67 three-car trains (201 cars), with Alstom branding
- Agra Metro
  - 28 three-car trains (84 cars), built by Alstom in Savli, Gujarat.
- Bhopal Metro
  - 27 three-car trains (81 cars)
- Indore Metro
  - 25 three-car trains (75 cars)

=== Romania ===
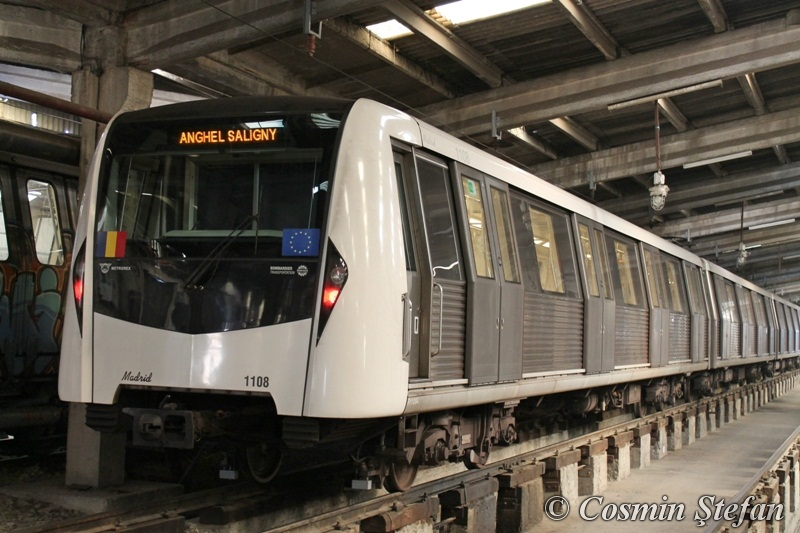
Bombardier Movia 346, used on the Bucharest Metro

- Bucharest Metro
  - 44 Bombardier MOVIA 346 trainsets (264 cars), built between 2002 and 2008

=== Singapore ===
- SBS Transit (MRT)
  - 92 three car trains (276 cars), on the Downtown Line in 2013 under C951/C951A
- SMRT (MRT)
  - 106 six car trains (636 cars), on the North–South Line and the East–West Line in 2023 under R151

=== Sweden ===
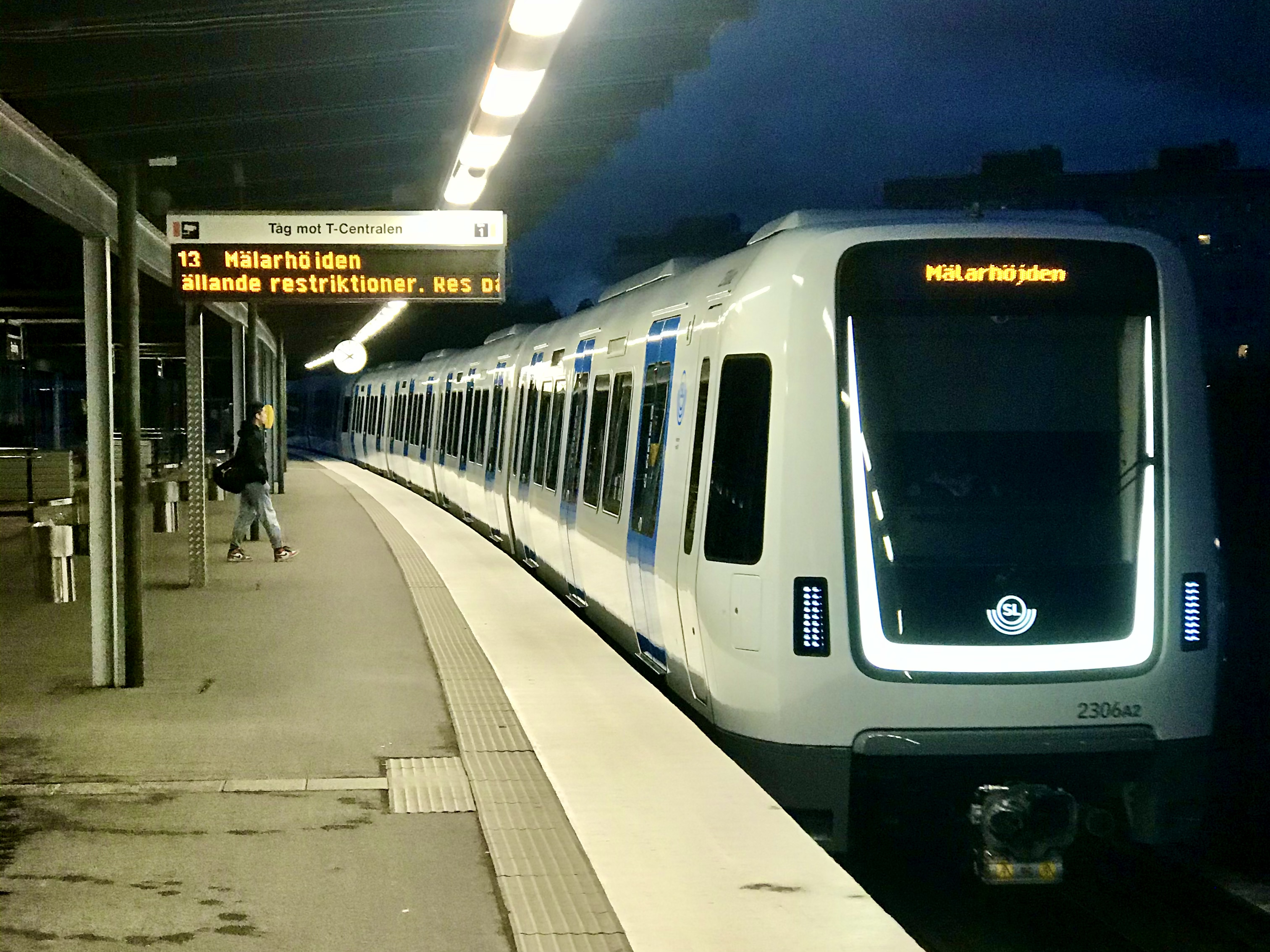
An arriving C30 train at Bredäng

- Stockholm Metro
  - 270 3-car C20 Movia sets (810 cars) originally built by Kalmar Verkstad and Adtranz (later acquired by Bombardier), as well as one 3-car C20F Movia set built by Bombardier with "FICAS" technology.
  - 96 4-car C30 Movia sets (384 cars) have been ordered to be used as 48 full-length trains on the Red line. The first units were delivered in mid-2018 and entered passenger service in August 2020. The last units are expected to be delivered in 2022.

=== United Kingdom ===
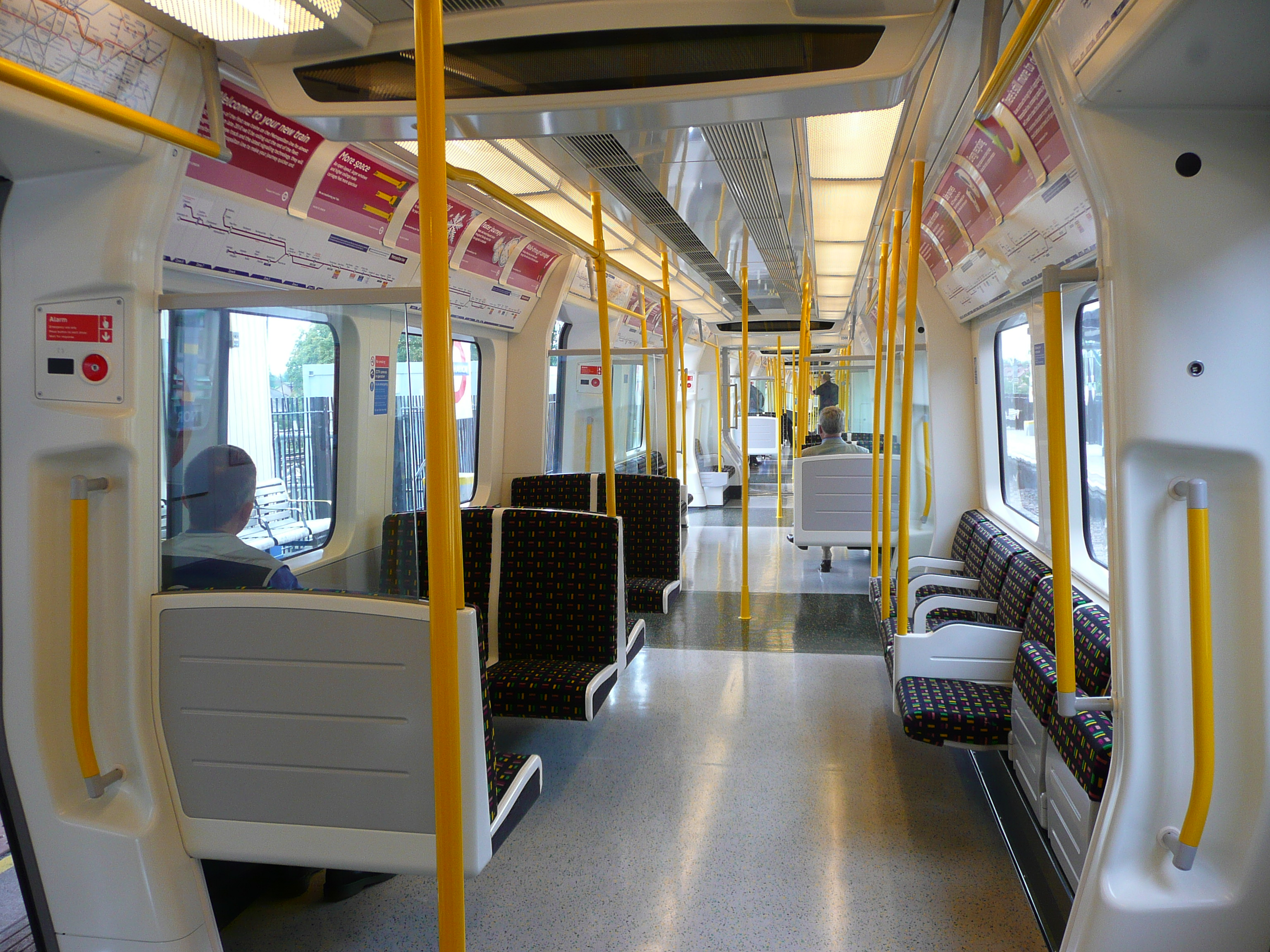
S Stock carriage for the London Underground

- London Underground
  - 47 trains – Movia tube stock, 8 car (2009 Stock) for the Victoria line
  - 192 trains – Movia sub-surface stock, 7 or 8 car (S Stock) for the Metropolitan, Hammersmith & City, Circle and District lines
  - Total of 1779 cars

=== United States ===
- Bay Area Rapid Transit
  - 310 D cars and 701 E cars (Fleet of Future)

== Production ==
- Kalmar, Småland, Sweden – former Kalmar Verkstad, manufactured 270 C20 units and the C20F prototype for Stockholm and the BM2 prototype for Bucharest
- LEW Hennigsdorf, Hennigsdorf, Germany – former Lokomotivbau-Elektrotechnische Werke (later Adtranz/AEG Schienenfahrzeuge GmbH) – European orders outside of UK and initial cars for Delhi Metro
- Changchun Alstom Railway Vehicles Co,. Ltd., Changchun, China – joint venture plant with CRRC Changchun Railway Vehicles Co., Ltd. – Chinese and Singapore orders
- Savli Railcar and Electrical Component Manufacturing Plant, Vadodara, Gujarat, India – most cars for Delhi Metro and all cars for Kanpur Metro
- Thunder Bay, Ontario, Canada – former Canadian Car and Foundry plant (Hawker Siddeley Canada/UTDC) – Toronto order
- Derby Litchurch Lane Works, England, United Kingdom – London Underground order
- Plattsburgh, New York, USA – BART order
- Pittsburg, California, USA – BART order
- Craiova, Romania - joint venture with Electroputere Craiova, the series production for the Bucharest Metro

== See also ==
- Alstom Metropolis
- Siemens Inspiro
- Siemens Modular Metro
