= Victoria line =

London Underground line

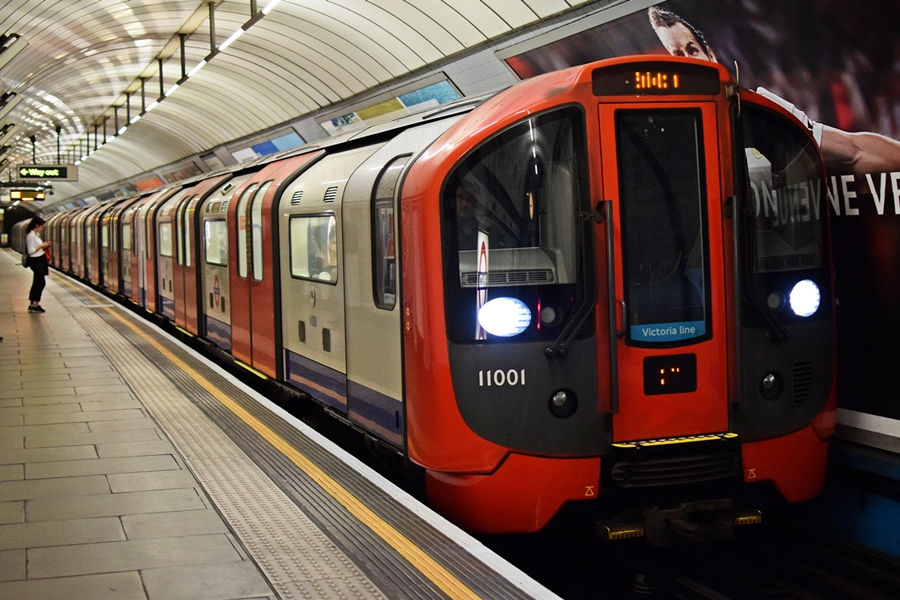
- A 2009 stock Victoria line train departs Euston

Overview
- Termini: Walthamstow Central; Brixton
- Stations: 16
- Colour on map: Light blue
- Website: tfl.gov.uk/tube/route/victoria

Service
- Type: Rapid transit
- System: London Underground
- Operator: London Underground Limited
- Depot: Northumberland Park
- Rolling stock: 2009 Stock
- Ridership: 302.009 million (2019) passenger journeys

History
- Opened: 1 September 1968; 58 years ago
- Last extension: 1971

Technical
- Line length: 21 km (13 mi)
- Character: Deep-level tube
- Track gauge: 1,435 mm (4 ft 8 1/2 in) standard gauge
- Electrification: Fourth rail, 630 V DC
- Operating speed: 80 km/h (50 mph)
- Signalling: CBTC (Distance to Go Radio)
Transport for London rail lines
London Underground
Bakerloo
Central
Circle
District
Hammersmith & City
Jubilee
Metropolitan
Northern
Piccadilly
Victoria
Waterloo & City
London Overground
Liberty
Lioness
Mildmay
Suffragette
Weaver
Windrush
Other TfL Modes
DLR
Elizabeth line
London Trams

The Victoria line is a London Underground line running between Brixton in South London, and Walthamstow Central in the east, via the West End. It is printed in light blue on the Tube map and is one of the only two lines on the network to run completely underground, the other being the Waterloo & City line. (Note: The exception is a branch line not used by passengers from Seven Sisters to the line's depot at Northumberland Park, position: 51°36′04″N 000°03′11″W)

The line was constructed in the 1960s and was the first entirely new Underground line in London for 50 years. It was designed to reduce congestion on other lines, particularly the Piccadilly line and the Charing Cross branch of the Northern line. The first section, from Walthamstow Central to Highbury & Islington, opened in September 1968, and an extension to Warren Street followed in December. The line was completed to Victoria station in March 1969 and was opened by Queen Elizabeth II who rode a train from Green Park to Victoria. The southern extension to Brixton opened in 1971, and Pimlico (the only station in the line without an interchange) was added in 1972.

The Victoria line is operated using automatic train operation, but all trains have drivers. The 2009 Tube Stock replaced the original 1967 Tube Stock trains. The line serves 16 stations and all but Pimlico provide interchanges with other Transport for London or National Rail services. The line, the most intensively used on the Underground, (Note: in terms of the average number of journeys per mile) was used by 302 million passengers in 2019, making it the second-busiest tube line. With trains arriving every 100 seconds at peak times, it is one of the most frequent rapid transit lines in the world.

== History ==
=== Planning ===
The first proposal for a railway in this area appeared in the County of London Plan, published in 1943. In 1948, a working party set up by the British Transport Commission (BTC) proposed a tube railway from Victoria to Walthamstow, largely based on a 1946 plan for a Croydon-to-Finsbury Park line. Its main purpose was to relieve congestion in the central area, which had been a problem since the 1930s. Other benefits were linking the key railway stations at Victoria, Euston, King's Cross and St Pancras and improving connections between north-east London and the city.

In early 1949, the BTC committee looked at the feasibility of building a deep-level tube to fulfil these requirements. For the first time, cost–benefit analysis was used to ensure the line would be built within budget and be profitable. A private bill was introduced in Parliament in 1955, describing a line from Victoria to Walthamstow (Wood Street), next to the British Rail station, and passed as the British Transport Commission Act 1955 (4 & 5 Eliz. 2. c. xxx). Another proposal, not in the bill, supported an extension from Victoria to Fulham Broadway on the District line terminating at Edmonton instead of Walthamstow. Proposals were made to extend the line north to South Woodford or Woodford to provide interchange with the Central line. In 1961, it was decided that the line would terminate at Walthamstow (Hoe Street) station rather than Wood Street – this would cut costs by £1.4 million, and "satisfactory interchange" with British Railways was available at Hoe Street station. Walthamstow (Hoe Street) was later renamed Walthamstow Central on 6 May 1968 in anticipation of the line's opening). The line was planned to have cross-platform interchanges at Oxford Circus, Euston and Finsbury Park (with the Bakerloo, Northern (Bank) and Piccadilly lines respectively) and at Walthamstow Central to provide a quick and easy connection between the new line and existing services.

- Work No. 1 A railway (4 miles 392 yards in length) in the city of Westminster and the metropolitan boroughs of St. Marylebone St. Pancras Finsbury and Islington commencing in the city of Westminster under the Commission's railway at Victoria Station at a point 45 yards north-east of the western end of Elizabeth Bridge and terminating in the metropolitan borough of Islington at a point 42 yards north of the south-eastern corner of Milner Square.
- [...]
- Work No. 3 A railway (1 mile 1107 yards in length) wholly in the metropolitan borough of Islington commencing by a junction with Work No. 1 at its termination (hereinbefore described) and terminating by a junction with the westbound tunnel of the Piccadilly Line at a point 93 yards south of Seven Sisters Road.
- [...]
- Work No. 12 A railway (5 miles 94 yards in length) in the metropolitan borough of Stoke Newington and the boroughs of Hornsey Tottenham and Walthamstow commencing in the borough of Hornsey by a junction with Works Nos. 10 and 11 at their termination (hereinbefore described) and terminating in the borough of Walthamstow by a junction with the Chingford branch railway at a point 350 yards north-east of Wood Street.
— Section 5, British Transport Commission Act 1955 (4 & 5 Eliz. 2. c. xxx)

The name "Victoria line" dates from 1955; other suggestions were "Walvic line" (Walthamstow–Victoria), "Viking line" (Victoria–King's Cross), "Mayfair line" and "West End line". During the planning stages, it was known as Route C and named the Victoria line (after the station) by David McKenna, Chairman of British Transport Advertising, whose suggestion was seconded by Sir John Elliot. The board decided that the Victoria line sounded "just right".

=== Walthamstow–Victoria ===
Initial construction began in January 1960, when two test tunnels were started from Tottenham to Manor House under Seven Sisters Road. The tunnels were excavated using an experimental "drum digger" rotary shield, powered by hydraulic rams, that could cut more than 60 feet (18 m) per day. The work was completed in July 1961, with the expectation it would be used for the completed Victoria line.

After a budget of £56 million was approved by the government on 20 August 1962, construction began the following month. The economic boom of the mid-to-late 1950s had faded leading to a rise in unemployment in London, and the government had hoped that building the Victoria line would alleviate this. Work began adapting Oxford Circus station to link to the new line; a cross-platform interchange was provided with the Bakerloo line and a subway link with the Central line. A steel umbrella was erected over the junction in August 1963 so that a new ticket hall could be built without disrupting existing traffic. Rolling stock on the line was fitted with automatic train operation (ATO), which allowed self-driving of the train based on automatic electrical signals along the track. In March 1964, a £2.25 million contract was awarded to Metro-Cammell for the Victoria line fleet.

That October, the Northern City Line closed between Drayton Park and Finsbury Park so that the latter station could be redesigned for a cross-platform interchange between the Victoria and Piccadilly lines. All major contracts had been awarded by 1965, and construction was on track to be completed in 1968. New stations were constructed at Walthamstow Central, Blackhorse Road, Tottenham Hale and Seven Sisters. The station at Blackhorse Road was built on the opposite side of the road from the mainline station (serving the Kentish Town to Barking line) and was not an interchange. (Note: The Kentish Town-to-Barking service, serving Blackhorse Road, was proposed for closure under the Beeching cuts.)

The line opened from Walthamstow Central to Highbury & Islington on 1 September 1968. There was no opening ceremony; instead the normal timetable started. The first train left Walthamstow Central for Highbury & Islington at 7:32 a.m. The line proved to meet a need; more than 1,000 tickets were purchased at Highbury & Islington within its first hour of opening.

The next section to Warren Street, opened on 1 December 1968, again without ceremony. The line was formally opened by Queen Elizabeth II on 7 March 1969 when it had been completed to Victoria. At 11:00 a.m., the Queen made the first trip, on a 5d (2.08p) ticket, from Green Park to Victoria, where she unveiled a plaque. In so doing, she was the first reigning monarch to ride on the Underground. The line was open to the general public by 3:00 p.m. Trains from Walthamstow to Victoria took around 24 minutes.

=== Victoria–Brixton ===
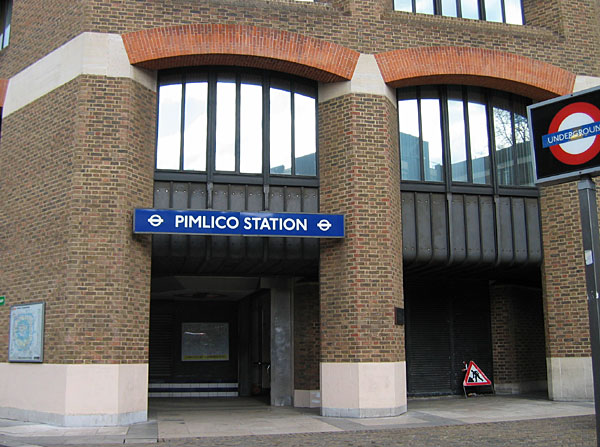
Pimlico station was the last part of the Victoria line to open, and is the line's only station that is not an interchange.

- Work No. 1 A railway (three hundred yards in length) wholly in the city of Westminster commencing under the Commission's railway at Victoria Station by a junction with Work No. 1 authorised by the Act of 1955 at a point two hundred and forty-eight yards north-east of Eccleston Bridge and terminating at a point twenty-five yards north-west of the junction of Belgrave Road and Gillingham Street.
— Section 5, British Transport Commission Act 1960 (8 & 9 Eliz. 2. c. xlvii)

- Work No. 1 A railway (3 miles 567 yards in length), commencing in the city of Westminster by а junction with Work No. 1 authorised by the Act of 1960 at the termination thereof, passing under the river Thames and terminating in the London borough of Lambeth, below a point 110 yards north-west of the junction of Somerleyton Road and Geneva Terrace.
— Section 5, London Transport Act 1966 (c. xxxiii)

The 3.5-mile (5.6 km) extension from Victoria to Brixton with stations at Vauxhall and Stockwell was approved in March 1966. Preparatory work had started at Bessborough Gardens near Vauxhall Bridge Road in May 1967. The contract was awarded on 4 August 1967. A proposal to build Pimlico tube station received government approval on 28 June 1968, and was authorised by the London Transport Act 1969 (c. l). In July, the Duke of Edinburgh and the Prince of Wales visited tunnel workings under Vauxhall Park.

The Brixton extension was bored using the older Greathead shield. Although slower, use of the tunnelling shield allowed easier digging through the gravel strata south of the Thames. It was opened on 23 July 1971 by Princess Alexandra, who made a journey from Brixton to Vauxhall. On opening, it was the first new section of Underground to open south of the Thames since the extension of the City and South London Railway from Clapham Common to Morden in 1926. The final piece of the Victoria line, Pimlico station, opened on 14 September 1972.

London Transport considered extensions to Streatham, Dulwich and Crystal Palace to provide a connection to southeast London and Kent but no construction work was undertaken.

=== Post-opening ===
The Kentish Town–to-Barking line did not close as expected and both stations at Blackhorse Road remained open. The mainline station was moved to the same side of the road as the tube station and was connected to the Victoria line on 14 December 1981 via an overbridge. The original station was then closed and demolished.

London Underground (Victoria) Act 1991
- Act of Parliament
- Parliament of the United Kingdom
- Long title: An Act to empower London Underground Limited to construct works and to acquire or use lands; and for connected purposes.
- Citation: 1991 c. x

Dates
- Royal assent: 27 June 1991

Text of statute as originally enacted

The London Underground (Victoria) Act 1991 (c. x) allowed for the construction of a 43-metre (140 ft) underground pedestrian link at Victoria station between the Victoria line platforms and the sub-surface Circle line platforms above. The London Underground (Victoria Station Upgrade) Order 2009 came into force in September that year, authorising the construction of a second 1,930-square-metre (21,000 sq ft) ticket hall at Victoria.

Warren Street tube station was attacked in the 21 July 2005 London bombings. There were no fatalities in this attack. After the 7 July 2005 London bombings, there was heightened security. The Metropolitan Police wrongly detained and fatally shot 27-year-old Jean Charles de Menezes once he boarded a train at Stockwell. After his death, a memorial to Menezes was placed close to Stockwell station.

On 23 January 2014, during upgrade work at Victoria, construction workers accidentally penetrated the signalling room of the Victoria line and flooded it with quick-setting concrete, leading to the suspension of services south of Warren Street. Services resumed the following day after sugar was used to slow the setting of the concrete and make it easier to shovel out.

A 24-hour Night Tube service on Friday and Saturday nights, due to start in September 2015 on the entire line, was delayed because of strike action. The service began in August 2016, with trains running at 10-minute intervals on the whole line.

== Design ==
Every Victoria line station, apart from Pimlico and Blackhorse Road, was built as an interchange and several stations were rearranged to allow for cross-platform interchange with the line. In some stations, the Victoria line platforms were built on either side of the existing arrangement; in others, the Victoria line uses the older platforms and the existing line was diverted onto a new alignment. All platforms on the line are 132.6 metres (435 ft) long. The line has hump-backed stations to allow trains to store gravitational potential energy as they slow down and release it when they leave a station, providing an energy saving of 5% and allowing trains to run 9% faster.

The stations were originally tiled in blue and grey, each decorated with tiled motifs in seating recesses for identification. Some motifs were puns; the image for Brixton, for instance, was a ton of bricks. During construction of the first stage of the Jubilee line in 1979, the motifs on Green Park station were replaced by others matching the design for the Jubilee line platforms.

In late 2010 and 2011, platform humps were installed on all Victoria line stations except Pimlico to provide step-free access to trains. The project was in accordance with the Rail Vehicle Accessibility (Non Interoperable Rail System) Regulations 2010 and the Disability Discrimination Act 1995. The Victoria line humps resemble the Harrington Hump, a type of ramp being installed on some mainline stations, but are of a masonry construction.

== Service and rolling stock ==
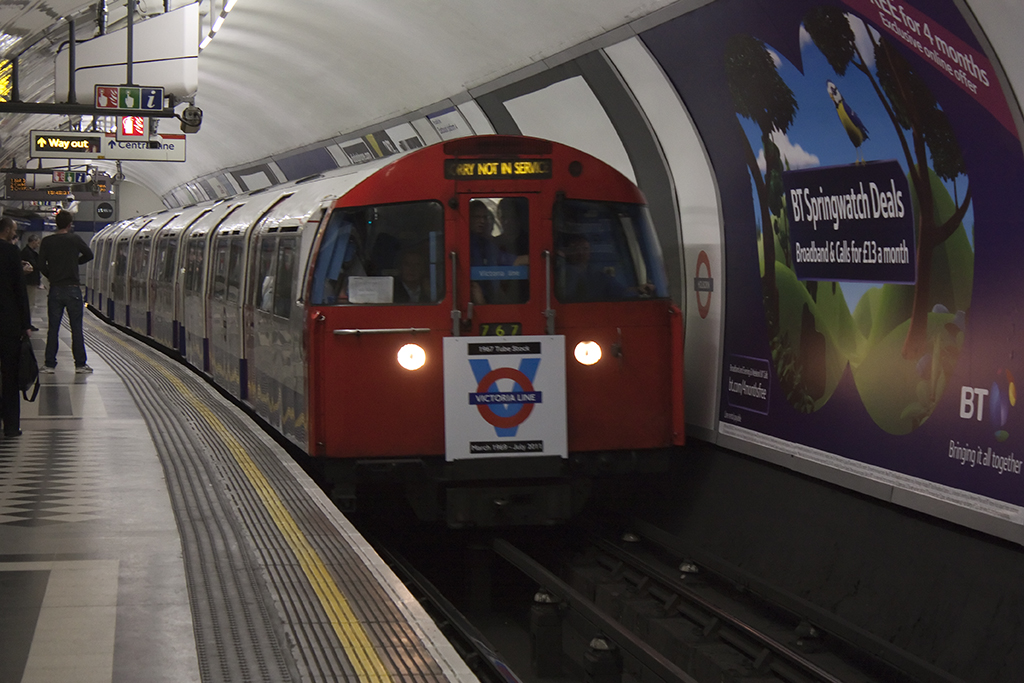
The line's original 1967 Stock was used until mid-2011. It is seen here at Holborn on a farewell tour.

About 200 million passengers a year use the Victoria line. It is the sixth-most heavily used line on the network in absolute figures, but in terms of the average number of journeys per mile it is by far the most intensively used. From May 2017, trains run every 100 seconds during peak periods, providing 36 trains per hour. All trains run from Brixton to Seven Sisters and some continue to Walthamstow Central. During off-peak periods, the Victoria line runs 27 trains per hour between Brixton and Walthamstow Central.

When the line opened, services were operated by a fleet of 39 1/2 eight-car trains of 1967 Tube Stock trains. In the early planning stages, an articulated type of rolling stock was considered, but not progressed because of difficulties transferring the stock to Acton Works for heavy overhauls. After Acton Works closed, this no longer applies. The 2009 tube stock has a wider profile and slightly longer carriages which precludes it from running on other deep-level tube lines. The 1967 stock was supplemented by 1972 Mark I Tube Stock, transferred from the Northern line and converted to be compatible with the 1967 stock.

Replacement of the 1967 rolling stock began in July 2009. The 2009 Tube Stock fleet of 47 eight-car trains was built by Bombardier Transportation. Testing the first prototypes began in 2008. The trains began to be introduced in 2009 and most were in operation by the following year. The last of the 1967 stock trains ran on 30 June 2011, after which the entire service was provided by 2009 stock.

On opening, the line was equipped with a fixed-block Automatic Train Operation system (ATO). The train operator closed the train doors and pressed a pair of "start" buttons and, if the way ahead was clear, the ATO drives the train at a safe speed to the next station. At any point, the driver could switch to manual control if the ATO failed. The system, which operated until 2012, made the Victoria line the world's first full-scale automatic railway. (Note: Although the system was tested on the Tube on a smaller scale before that, initially on a short section of the District line; then a larger trial was carried out on the Central line between Woodford and Hainault.)

The Victoria line runs faster trains than other Underground lines because it has fewer stops, ATO running and modern design. Train speeds can reach up to 50 miles per hour (80 km/h). In the 2010s, the original signalling was replaced with a more modern ATO system from Westinghouse Rail Systems incorporating 'Distance to Go Radio' and more than 400 track circuits. London Underground claimed it was the world's first ATO-on-ATO upgrade. The new signalling system allowed a revised timetable to be introduced in February 2013, allowing up to 33 trains per hour instead of 27. In combination with new, faster trains, the line's capacity increased by 21%, equivalent to an extra 10,000 passengers per hour. By 2019, the line was running around 36 trains per hour at peak times, with a train arriving every 100 seconds – making it one of the most frequent rapid transit lines in the world.

== Facilities ==
=== Step-free access ===
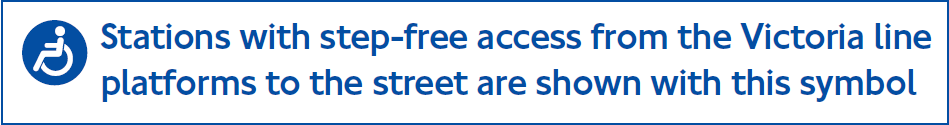
Notice explaining about step-free access. This can be found inside every Victoria line train.

When the line was built, budgetary restrictions meant that station infrastructure standards were lower than on older lines and on later extension projects. Examples include narrower than usual platforms and undecorated ceilings at Walthamstow Central, Blackhorse Road and Tottenham Hale, affecting lighting levels. The line was built with fewer escalators than other lines as a cost-saving measure. The lack of a third escalator linking station entrances to platforms at some stations can cause severe congestion at peak times. Stations have closed temporarily for safety reasons when escalators have been unserviceable.

Step-free routes are available between the Victoria line and other lines at most interchanges. Tottenham Hale, Finsbury Park, King's Cross St Pancras, Green Park, Victoria, Vauxhall and Brixton have step-free access from street to train. Platform humps have been installed at all stations (except Pimlico) to provide level access to trains, improving access for customers with mobility impairments, luggage or pushchairs.

=== Ventilation ===
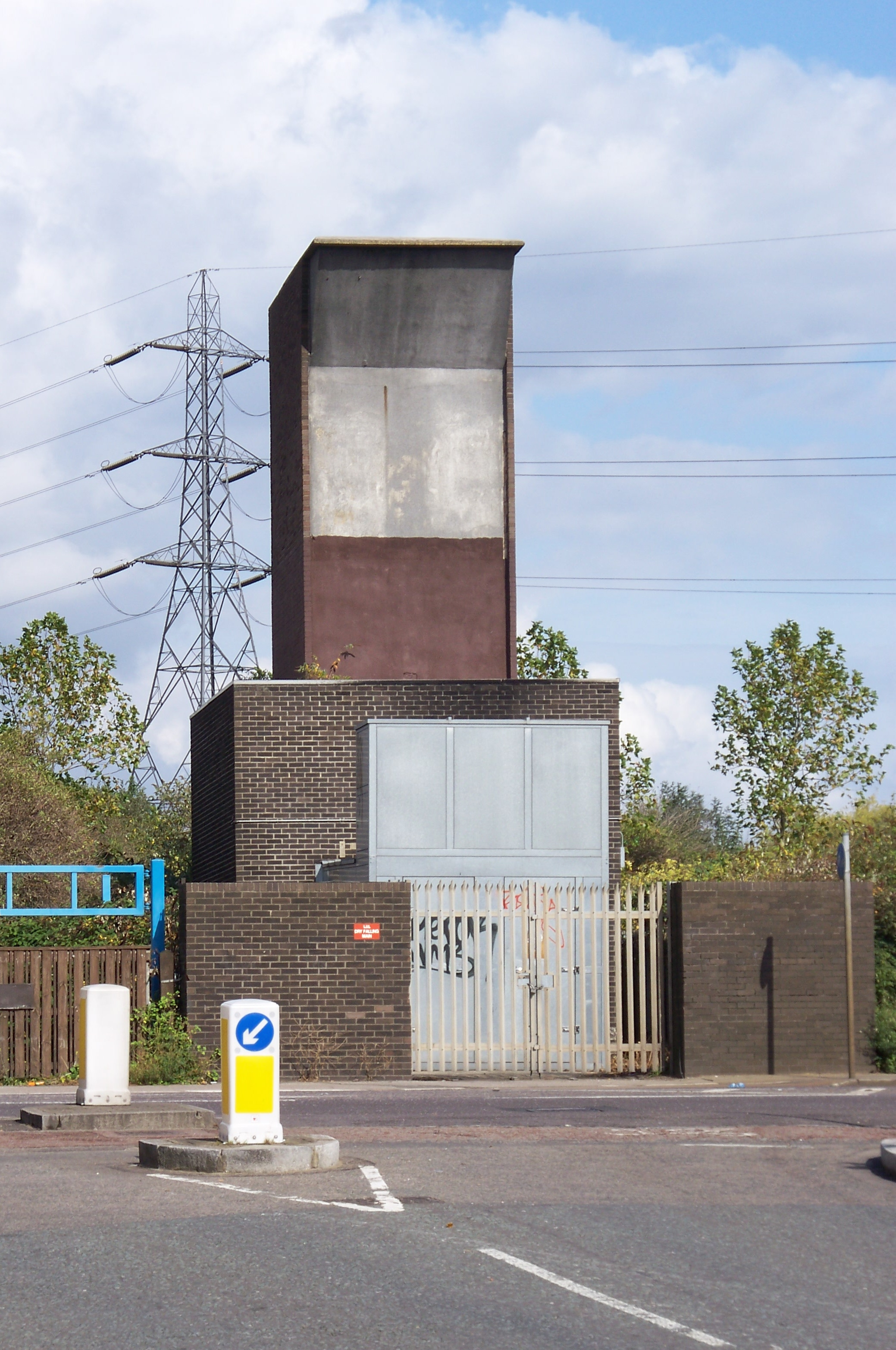
Ferry Lane fan shaft and emergency access point at Heron Island, approximately halfway between Blackhorse Road and Tottenham Hale stations

About 50 ventilation shafts were constructed during the construction phase. Midpoint tunnel ventilation shafts remain between stations. Special "local arrangements" are in place should it be necessary to evacuate passengers from trains via Netherton Road emergency escape shaft. Planning permission for a shaft at Ferry Lane, next to Tottenham Hale station, was granted on 11 January 1968, during the first phase of construction.

By mid-2009, trial boreholes for a cooling system at Green Park station had been drilled and more were scheduled to be created by the end of 2009. In 2010, Engineering & Technology reported that 200 litres (44 imp gal) of water per second for the cooling system was being pumped through heat-exchangers at Victoria station from the River Tyburn and into the River Thames.

Between 2009 and 2014, thirteen ventilation shafts were refurbished. In the first phase were Drayton Park, Gillingham Street, Moreton Terrace, Pulross Road, Somerleyton Road and Tynemouth Road. For the second phase were Cobourg Street, Dover Street, Gibson Square, Great Titchfield Street, Isledon Road, Kings Cross, Palace Street and Rita Road.

By 2009, changes at Cobourg Street were in the planning stage and demolition at Moreton Terrace, Somerleyton Road and Drayton Park shafts had taken place. Planning permission for Netherton Road shaft was granted on 8 September 1967. On 31 March, the demolition and rebuilding of Netherton Road shaft was allowed as permitted development.

== Depot ==
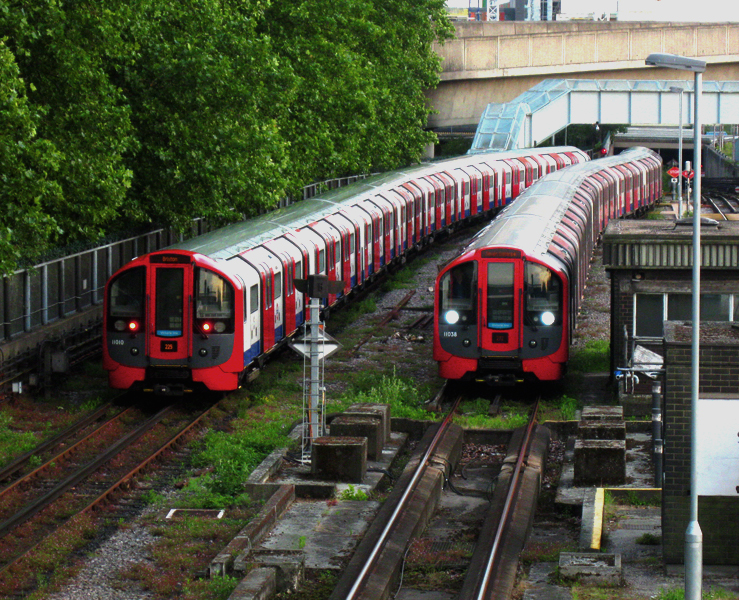
2009 tube stock at the Victoria line's Northumberland Park Depot

The depot at Northumberland Park, the service and storage area for trains, is the only part of the Victoria line above ground. Trains access the depot via a branch line in a tunnel to the north of Seven Sisters.

The depot opened with the first stage of the line in September 1968. It is next to Northumberland Park railway station, on Tottenham Marshes in the London Borough of Haringey, over a mile from the Victoria line. When built, it was 900 feet (270 m) long and had working space for 22 eight-car trains. As part of Transport for London's tube upgrade scheme, the depot has been expanded and upgraded to accommodate all the 2009 Tube Stock trains and a new signalling system.

== Future ==
Tottenham Hotspur F.C. and its supporters have campaigned for a surface station next to Northumberland Park station, adjacent to the depot to improve transport links to the stadium. The plans would require co-operation with the local council and Network Rail to minimise disruption. It was announced by Haringey Council in its 2012 A Plan for Tottenham report that there was "potential for a Victoria Line extension to Northumberland Park".

Crossrail 2, also known as the Chelsea-Hackney line, is a proposed line across central London between Victoria and King's Cross St Pancras tube station to increase capacity in Central London by 270,000 passengers per day. It is intended to relieve congestion on the Victoria line, a key line connecting several important London termini.

Proposals have been made to extend the line one stop southwards from Brixton to Herne Hill, a significant interchange in south London providing access to Kent, Blackfriars, London Bridge and Sutton. Herne Hill would be on a large reversing loop with a single platform removing a critical capacity restriction eliminating the need for trains to reverse at Brixton and provide a more obvious route for passengers who look for the nearest tube station before any other transport options.

== Map ==
The route of the Victoria line

== Stations ==
Station	Image	Opened	Victoria line service began	Interchanges	Position
Walthamstow Central		26 April 1870 (Note: Opened as Hoe Street, renamed when Victoria Line opened on 1 September 1968.)	1 September 1968	Weaver line	51°34′59″N 000°01′11″W
Blackhorse Road		19 July 1894	1 September 1968	Suffragette line	51°35′13″N 000°02′29″W
Tottenham Hale		15 September 1840 (Note: Opened as Tottenham, renamed on 1 December 1968.)	1 September 1968	National Rail	51°35′18″N 000°03′35″W
Seven Sisters (Note: Seven Sisters is the only station with more than 2 platforms. The third is a holding platform for trains that terminate their journeys from Brixton at Seven Sisters instead of at Walthamstow. The third platform allows access to the Northumberland Park depot.)		22 July 1872	1 September 1968	Weaver line and National Rail	51°34′56″N 000°04′31″W
Finsbury Park		1 July 1861 (Note: Opened as Seven Sisters Road (Holloway), renamed 15 November 1869.)	1 September 1968	Piccadilly line (CPI) and National Rail	51°33′53″N 000°06′23″W
Highbury & Islington		26 September 1850	1 September 1968	Mildmay line, Windrush line and National Rail (CPI)	51°32′45″N 000°06′18″W
King's Cross St Pancras		10 January 1863	1 December 1968	Circle, Hammersmith & City, Metropolitan, Northern and Piccadilly lines; National Rail and Eurostar	51°31′49″N 000°07′27″W
Euston		12 May 1907	1 December 1968	Northern line (CPI with Bank branch), Lioness line and National Rail	51°31′42″N 000°07′59″W
Warren Street		22 June 1907	1 December 1968	Northern line	51°31′29″N 000°08′18″W
Oxford Circus		30 July 1900	7 March 1969	Bakerloo (CPI) and Central lines	51°30′55″N 000°08′30″W
Green Park		15 December 1906	7 March 1969	Jubilee and Piccadilly lines	51°30′24″N 000°08′34″W
Victoria ( Trains to Gatwick)		1 October 1860	7 March 1969	Circle and District lines and National Rail	51°29′48″N 000°08′41″W
Pimlico		14 September 1972		—N/a	51°29′22″N 000°08′00″W
Vauxhall		11 July 1848	23 July 1971	National Rail, London River Services (St George Wharf Pier)	51°29′07″N 000°07′22″W
Stockwell		4 November 1890	23 July 1971	Northern line (CPI)	51°28′21″N 000°07′20″W
Brixton		23 July 1971	23 July 1971	National Rail (within a 100 metres (330 ft) walking distance)	51°27′45″N 000°06′54″W

== See also ==
- List of crossings of the River Thames
- Tunnels underneath the River Thames
