= Institution of Electronic and Radio Engineers =

Professional organization

The Institution of Electronic and Radio Engineers (IERE) was a professional organization for radio engineers. It was originally established in 1925 as the Institute of Wireless Technology. It renamed itself British Institution of Radio Engineers in 1941, and eventually Institution of Electronic and Radio Engineers. In 1988, it merged with the Institution of Electrical Engineers (IEE), and in another merger in 2006 became the Institution of Engineering and Technology (IET).

It had an Indian division based in Bangalore.

== Activities ==
The main aim of the Institution was the advancement of the practice of radio engineering, through conferences, meetings, and training. The Institution published the Journal of the British Institution of Radio Engineers between 1939 and 1962. From 1963–64, it published the Proceedings of the British Institution of Radio Engineers.

The Institution awarded the Clerk Maxwell Prize. As the British Institution of Radio Engineers, it established the Charles Babbage Premium in 1959 as an annual award "for an outstanding paper on the design or use of electronic computers".

== Officers ==
=== President ===
Lt Colonel R.R.C. Rankin. retired May 1974

== Bibliography ==
- Clifford, Graham D.; Sharp, Frank W. (1989). A Twentieth Century Professional Institution: The Story of I.E.R.E., 1925–1988. History of Technology series. Peter Peregrinus. ISBN 978-0787615024.
