= IET Smart Cities =

Technical journal

- Discipline: Smart cities
- Language: English
- Edited by: William Webb, Chai K. Toh

Publication details
- History: 2019–present
- Publisher: Wiley on behalf of the Institution of Engineering and Technology
- Frequency: Quarterly
- Open access: Yes
- License: CC BY

Standard abbreviations
- ISO 4: IET Smart Cities

Indexing
- ISSN: 2631-7680
- LCCN: 2021244555
- OCLC no.: 1096469313

Links
- Journal homepage; Online access; Online archive

IET Smart Cities is a quarterly peer-reviewed scientific journal on urban engineering and sciences, more specifically on all aspects of smart cities. It was established in 2019 and is published by Wiley on behalf of the Institution of Engineering and Technology. The editors-in-chief are William Webb (Webb Consulting) and Chai K. Toh (Gerson Lehrman Group and National Tsing Hua University).

== Abstracting and indexing ==
The journal is abstracted and indexed in:

- Ei Compendex
- Emerging Sources Citation Index
- Inspec
- Scopus
