= Engineering & Technology =

UK science magazine

Engineering & Technology (E+T) is a science, engineering and technology magazine published by Redactive on behalf of IET Services, a wholly owned subsidiary of the Institution of Engineering and Technology (IET), a registered charity in the United Kingdom. The magazine is issued 6 times per year in print and online. The E+T website is also updated regularly with news stories. E+T is distributed to the 154,000 plus membership of the IET around the world.

The magazine was launched in April 2008 as a result of the merger between the Institution of Electrical Engineers and the Institution of Incorporated Engineers on 31 March 2006. Prior to the merger, both organisations had their own membership magazine, the IEE's monthly IEE Review and the IIE's Engineering Technology. Engineering & Technology is an amalgamation of the two, and was initially published monthly. Alongside this, members also received one of seven other monthly magazines published by the IET relating to a field of the subject of their choice, with the option to purchase any of the other titles. In January 2008, the IET merged these seven titles into E+T to make a nearly fortnightly magazine with a larger pagination, providing all members with one magazine covering all topics. In January 2011 the frequency was reduced to 12 times per year and to 11 times per year in 2015 and 10 times per year in 2017.

E+T journalists have been shortlisted and won multiple magazine industry awards, including those presented by the British Society of Magazine Editors, Trade And Business Publications International and the Professional Publishers Association.
