= Willy Susilo =

Australian computer scientist

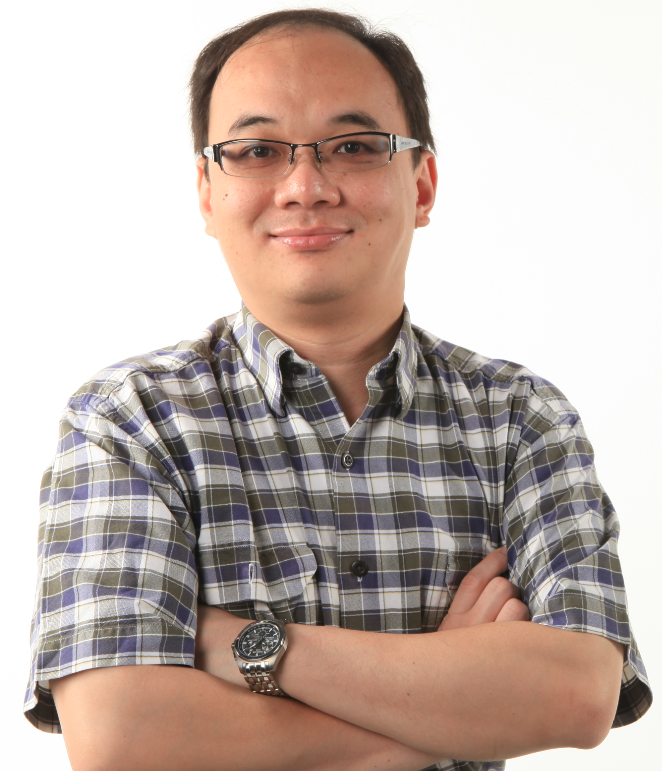
- Susilo in 2017
- Born: Surabaya, Indonesia
- Education: University of Wollongong (PhD); University of Wollongong (MCompSc); University of Surabaya (BEng)
- Awards: 2024 Premier's Prizes for Science and Engineering; 2024 UOW Alumni Award for Research and Scholarship; 2023 Australian Laureate Fellow; 2021 IEEE Fellow; 2021 IET Fellow; 2021 ACS Fellow; 2021 AAIA Fellow; 2020 Vice Chancellor’s Award for Global Strategy; 2019 Supervisor of the year; 2016 Researcher of the year
- Scientific career
- Fields: Cryptography; Cybersecurity; Computer Security
- Workplaces: University of Wollongong
- Thesis: Contributions to Fail-stop Signature Schemes (2001)
- Doctoral advisor: Rei Safavi-Naini
- Other academic advisors: Josef Pieprzyk
- Website: University of Wollongong — Willy Susilo

Willy Susilo (/ˈsusiloʊ/) is an Australian cybersecurity scientist and cryptographer. He is a distinguished professor at the School of Computing and Information Technology, Faculty of Engineering and Information Sciences University of Wollongong, Australia.

Willy Susilo is a fellow of IEEE (Computer Society), IET, ACS, and AAIA. He is the director of Institute of Cybersecurity and Cryptology, School of Computing and Information Technology, University of Wollongong. Willy is an innovative educator and researcher. Currently, he is the Head of School of Computing and Information Technology at UOW (2015 - now). Prior to this role, he was awarded the prestigious Australian Research Council Future Fellowship in 2009. He was the former Head of School of Computer Science and Software Engineering (2009 - 2010) and the Deputy Director of ICT Research Institute at UOW (2006 - 2008).

He is currently serving as the associate editor of IEEE Transactions on Dependable and Secure Computing (TDSC) and has served an associate editor of IEEE Transactions on Information Forensics and Security (TIFS). He is the Editor-in-Chief of the Elsevier Computer Standards and Interface and the Information journals. His research interest is cybersecurity and cryptography.

Willy obtained his PhD from the University of Wollongong in 2001. He has published more than 400 papers in journals and conference proceedings in cryptography and network security. He has served as the program committee member of several international conferences.

In 2016, he was awarded the "Researcher of the Year" at UOW, due to his research excellence and contributions. His work on the creation of short signature schemes has been well cited and it is part of the IETF draft.

== Biography ==
Willy received his Bachelor degree from the Faculty of Engineering at Universitas Surabaya, Indonesia. He went to the University of Wollongong, Australia, to pursue his Master's and Ph.D. degrees. He was awarded a Ph.D. degree in 2001 from the University of Wollongong, Australia.

== Research ==
Willy Susilo's research is in the area of cybersecurity and cryptography. His primary research focus is to design solutions and cryptographic algorithms to contribute towards securing the cyberspace. In 2023 he was awarded an Australian Laureate Fellowship to further his research in cryptography and cloud computing.

== Publications and awards ==
Distinguished Professor Willy Susilo is author and co-author of over 400 research papers. His work in cryptography, computer-security, information-technology, cyber-security, and network-security.

- 2024, 2024 Premier's Prizes for Science and Engineering
- 2024, UOW Alumni Award for Research and Scholarship
- 2023, Australian Laureate Fellow
- 2021, IET Fellow
- 2021, IEEE Fellow
- 2021, ACS Fellow
- 2021, AAIA Fellow
- 2020, "Vice Chancellor's Global Strategy Award"
- 2019, "Vice-Chancellor's Award For Research Supervision"
- 2016, "Vice Chancellor's Research Excellence Award for Researcher of the Year"

== Books ==
- F. Guo, W. Susilo and Y. Mu. Introduction to Security Reduction. Springer, 2018. ISBN 978-3-319-93048-0
- K.C. Li, X. Chen, and W. Susilo. Advances in Cyber Security: Principles, Techniques, and Applications. Springer, 2019. ISBN 978-981-13-1483-4
- X. Chen, W. Susilo, and E. Bertino. Cyber Security Meets Machine Learning. Springer, 2021. ISBN 978-981-33-6726-5

== Professional Services ==
Willy Susilo is the Editor-in-Chief of two journals. He is also General and PC Co-chair of more than 20 different international conferences in cryptography and cybersecurity.

=== Editor-in-Chief ===
- Computers Standard and Interfaces (Elsevier)
- Information journal (MDPI)

=== Professional Membership ===
- Fellow of IET.
- Fellow of IEEE.
- Fellow of Asia-Pacific Artificial Intelligence Association (AAIA).
- Fellow of the Australian Computer Society (ACS).
- Member of the International Cryptographic Association Research (IACR).
