= IET Software =

- Discipline: Computer science, Software, Software engineering
- Language: English

Publication details
- History: 2007–present
- Publisher: Institution of Engineering and Technology (IET) (United Kingdom)
- Frequency: Bimonthly
- Impact factor: 1.07 (2015)

Standard abbreviations
- ISO 4: IET Softw.

Indexing
- ISSN: 1751-8806 (print); 1751-8814 (web)
- OCLC no.: 76910934

Links
- Journal homepage; Online access

IET Software is a peer-reviewed scientific journal on software engineering and related issues, published by the Institution of Engineering and Technology (IET) in the United Kingdom.

The journal was previously published under the following titles:

- Software & Microsystems (1982–1986, Online ISSN 2053-9096, Print ISSN 0261-3182)
- Software Engineering Journal (1986–1996, Online ISSN 2053-910X, Print ISSN 0268-6961)
- IEE Proceedings - Software (1997–2006. Online ISSN 1463-9831, Print ISSN 1462-5970)

The journal is listed on the online IEEE Xplore Digital Library. It is indexed by DBLP, EBSCO, Ei Compendex, IET Inspec, ProQuest, Science Citation Index Expanded (SCI-E), SCImago, and Scopus.

== See also ==
- IEEE Software magazine
- IEEE Transactions on Software Engineering journal
