= IET Information Security =

- Discipline: Computer science
- Language: English
- Edited by: Yvo Desmedt

Publication details
- History: 2005-present
- Publisher: Institution of Engineering and Technology
- Frequency: Bimonthly
- Impact factor: 2.6 (2024)

Standard abbreviations
- ISO 4: IET Inf. Secur.

Indexing
- ISSN: 1751-8709 (print); 1751-8717 (web)
- LCCN: 2007254219
- OCLC no.: 123759430
- IEE Proceedings - Information Security
- ISSN: 1747-0722

Links
- Journal homepage; Online access

IET Information Security is a bimonthly peer-reviewed scientific journal covering information security and cryptography. It was established in 2005 as IEE Proceedings - Information Security, obtaining its current name in 2007. It is published by the Institution of Engineering and Technology and the editor-in-chief is Yvo Desmedt (University College London).

== Abstracting and indexing ==
The journal is abstracted and indexed in:

- Current Contents/Engineering, Computing & Technology
- EBSCO databases
- Ei Compendex
- Inspec
- METADEX
- PASCAL
- ProQuest databases
- Science Citation Index Expanded
- Scopus
