= Institution of Electrical Engineers =

British professional organisation, 1871–2006

IEE logo

The Institution of Electrical Engineers (IEE) was a British professional organisation of electronics, electrical, manufacturing, and information technology professionals, especially electrical engineers. It began in 1871 as the Society of Telegraph Engineers. In 2006, it merged with the Institution of Incorporated Engineers and the new organisation is Institution of Engineering and Technology (IET).

Notable past presidents have included Lord Kelvin (1889), Sir Joseph Swan (1898) and Sebastian de Ferranti (1910–11). Notable chairmen include John M. M. Munro (1910–11).

== History ==
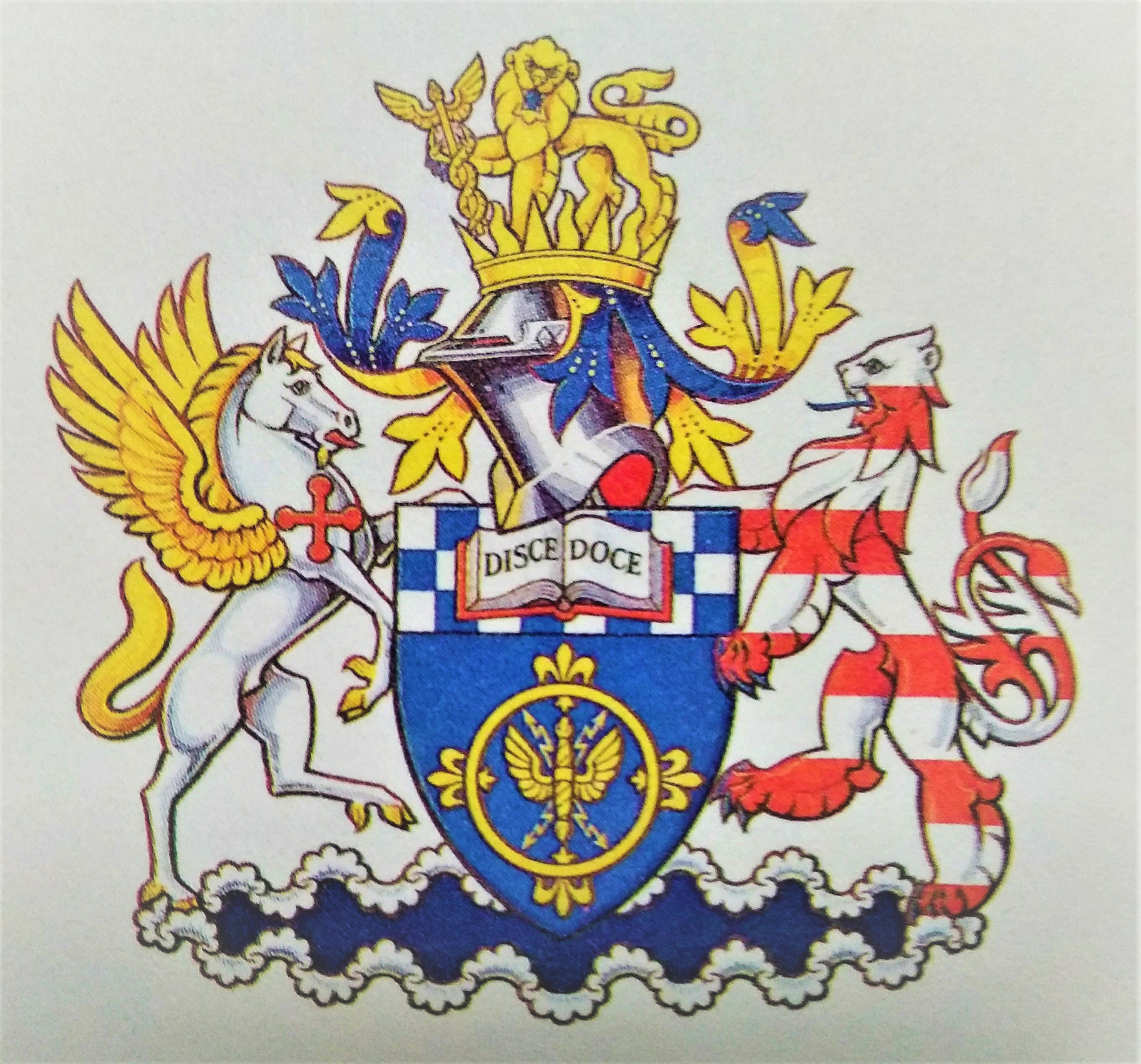
The old crest of IEE, UK

The IEE was founded in 1871 as the Society of Telegraph Engineers, changed its name in 1880 to the Society of Telegraph Engineers and Electricians and changed to the Institution of Electrical Engineers in 1888. It was Incorporated by a Royal Charter in 1921.

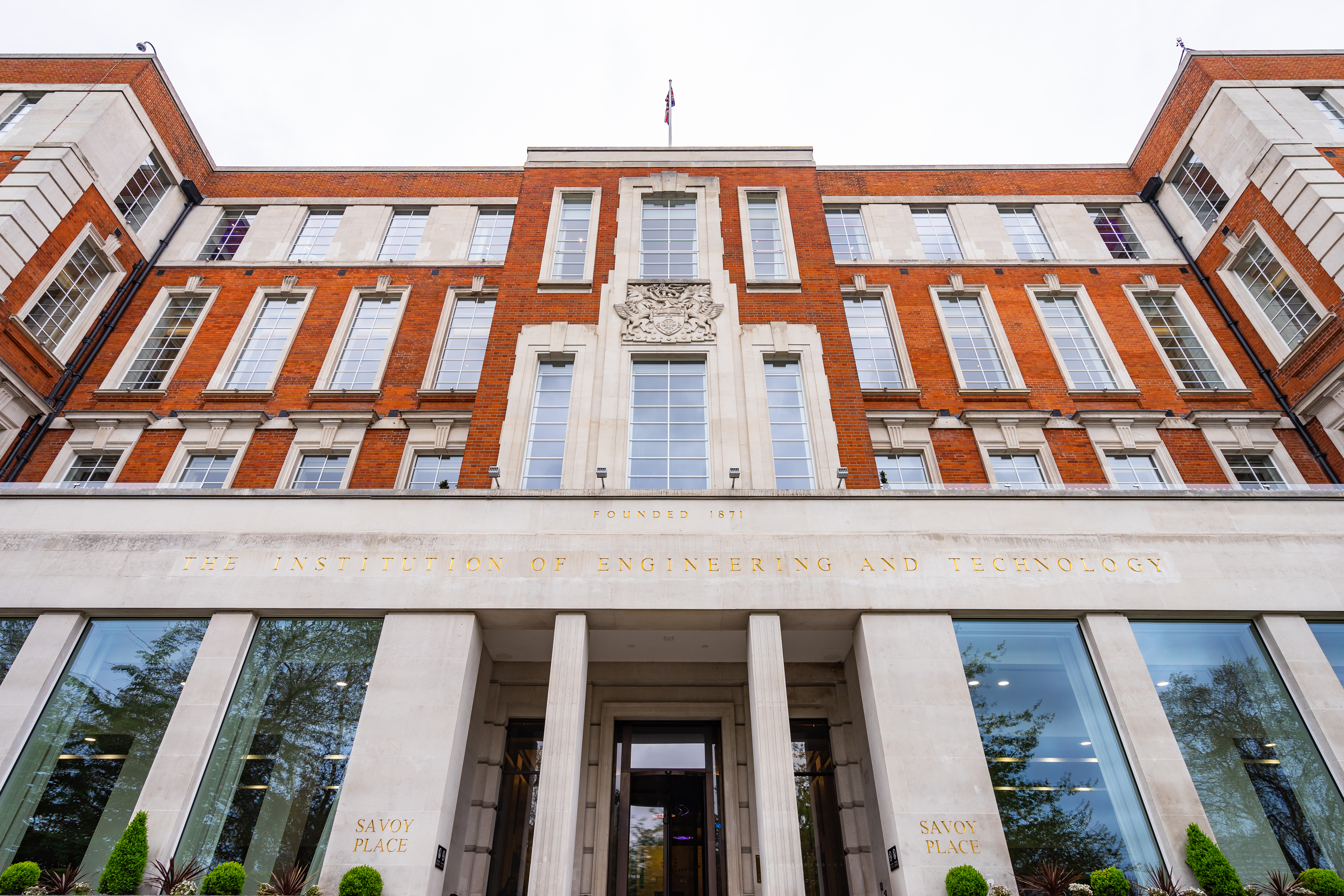
Since 1909 the IEE (latterly the IET) has had its headquarters at Savoy Place on the Victoria Embankment.

In 1988 the Institution of Electrical Engineers (IEE) merged with the Institution of Electronic and Radio Engineers (IERE), originally the British Institution of Radio Engineers (Brit IRE) founded in 1925.

By the mid-2000s, the IEE was the largest professional engineering society in Europe, with a worldwide membership of around 120,000.

Discussions about a merger with the Institution of Incorporated Engineers (IIE) under a new name started in 2004, and following membership voting, the IEE merged with the IIE on 31 March 2006 to form the Institution of Engineering and Technology (IET).

== Wiring Regulations ==
The IEE was the publisher of the British Standard for Electrical wiring in the United Kingdom, BS 7671. This is now published by the IET.

== See also ==
- Institute of Electrical and Electronics Engineers
- Institution of Engineering and Technology
- List of presidents of the Institution of Electrical Engineers
- Proceedings of the Institution of Electrical Engineers
- Charles Babbage Premium
