= Yi Mu (academic) =

- Education: Australian National University (PhD)
- Scientific career
- Fields: Computer science, cryptography, quantum informatics
- Workplaces: Australia National University; University of Wollongong

Yi Mu (穆怡) is a professor in Faculty of Data Science, City University of Macau, SAR, Macau, China. He obtained his PhD from the Australian National University in 1994. He was a professor of computer science at the University of Wollongong prior to his job as a professor at Fujian Normal University during 2018 and 2020. He has published more than 500 papers in journals and conference proceedings in cryptography, information security, quantum cryptography, and quantum optics. He was Editor-in-Chief of the International Journal of Applied Cryptography

His seminal work about one-atom lasers (single atom laser) was experimentally realized by H. Jeff Kimble. His work on quantum key distribution is regarded as MSZ96 protocol, which is based on quantized quadrature phase amplitudes of light.
