= Pimlico tube station =

London Underground station

Pimlico
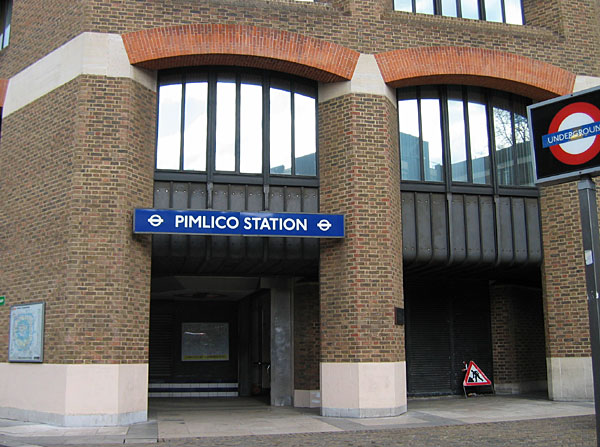
- Main entrance on Rampayne Street
- Interactive map of Pimlico

General information
- Location: Pimlico
- Local authority: City of Westminster
- Managed by: London Underground
- Number of platforms: 2
- Fare zone: 1

London Underground annual entry and exit
- 2021: ▼4.06 million
- 2022: ▲6.93 million
- 2023: ▲7.09 million
- 2024: ▲7.34 million
- 2025: ▲7.64 million

Railway companies
- Original company: London Transport Executive (GLC)

Key dates
- 23 July 1971: Line opened
- 14 September 1972: Station opened

Other information
- External links: TfL station info page
- Coordinates: 51°29′21″N 0°08′01″W

Pimlico (/ˈpɪmlɪkoʊ/) is a London Underground station in Pimlico, City of Westminster. It is on the Victoria line between Vauxhall and Victoria stations, and is in London fare zone 1. It was a late addition to the line, not appearing in the original plans, and the last to open in 1972.

The station is the only one on the line without an interchange to any other railway line or Underground line, and is the deepest beneath sea level. It is the main transport access point for the Tate Britain gallery. The station is known for its distinctive artwork, which reflects its proximity to the Tate Britain. Several buildings surrounding the station are Grade II listed, though the station itself is not.

== Location and name ==
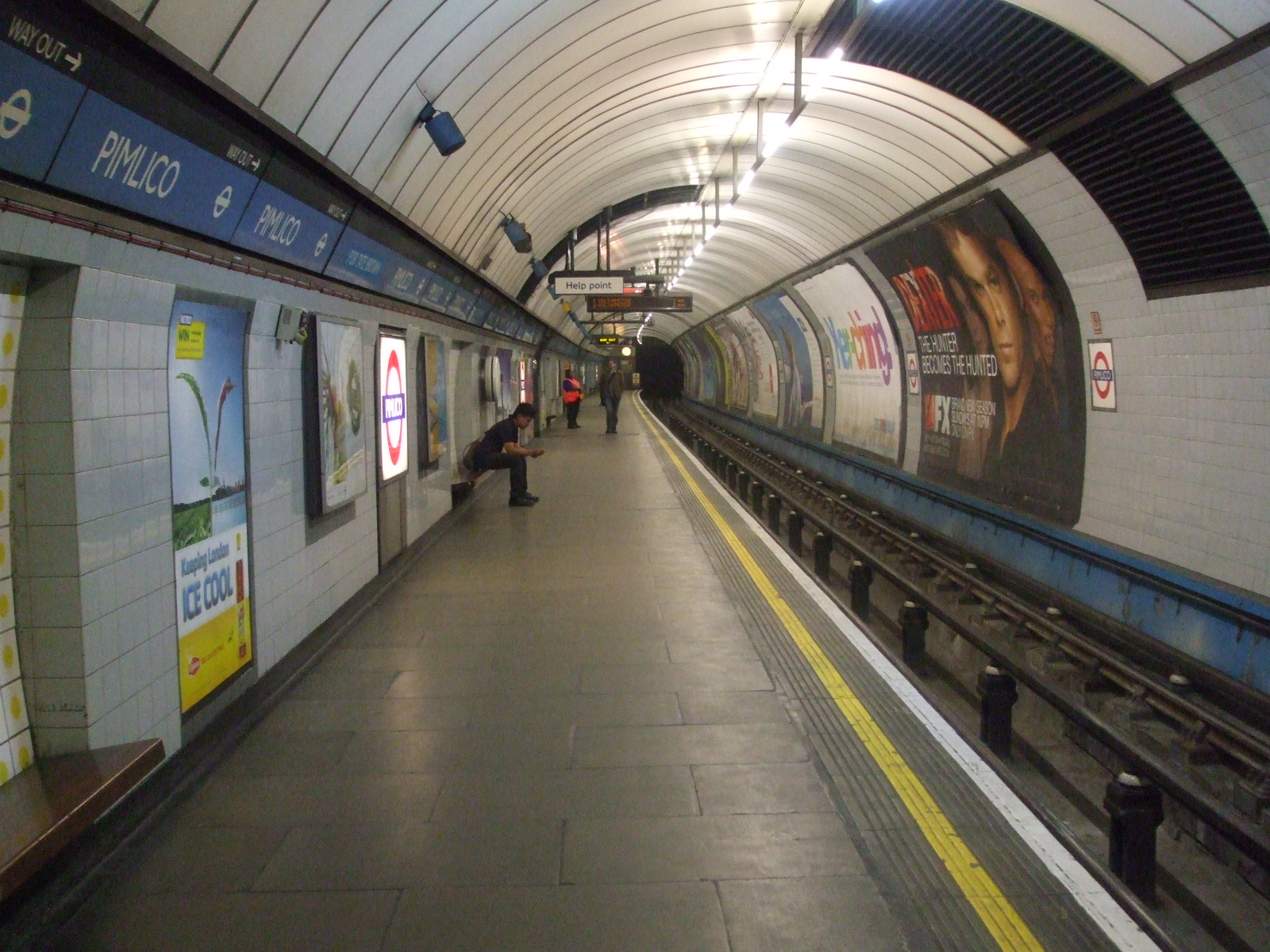
Northbound platform looking south

The station is in London fare zone 1 at the junction of Bessborough Street and Rampayne Street. There are three entrances; entrance A with the ticket hall is on the east side of Rampayne Street, while exit C is on the west side of Bessborough Street. An additional exit, B is further along on Bessborough Street to the east of these two. There are two platforms; platform 1 serves trains northbound to Victoria while platform 2 serves trains southbound to Vauxhall. The platforms are around 22.5 metres (73.8 ft) below ground.

The main entrance forms part of an eight-storey octagonal building, designed in 1976 by William Whitfield of Whitfield and Partners, and erected between 1980 and 1983. It was a speculative development by the Crown Commissioners, and consists of a concrete frame with a skin of red bricks, which is load-bearing. The building is an example of post-modernist architecture, and is Grade II listed in recognition of this, although the tube station is specifically excluded from the listing. Next to the station entrance is a sculptural ventilation shaft, designed and built between 1978 and 1982 by the artist Eduardo Paolozzi. The casting was produced by the Robert Taylor Foundry in Larbert, Scotland. This is also Grade II listed, and is part of the ventilation system for the basement of 2 Bessborough Street and 33 Vauxhall Bridge Road.

Both the station and the surrounding area are believed to be named after a 16th-century publican, Ben Pimlico, who was well known for brewing nut-brown ale. Pimlico is the only station on the Victoria line which does not have an interchange with another Underground or National Rail line. There is no step-free access. It is the deepest station on the line measured by average depth of platform below sea-level, at 16 m (52 ft).

== History ==
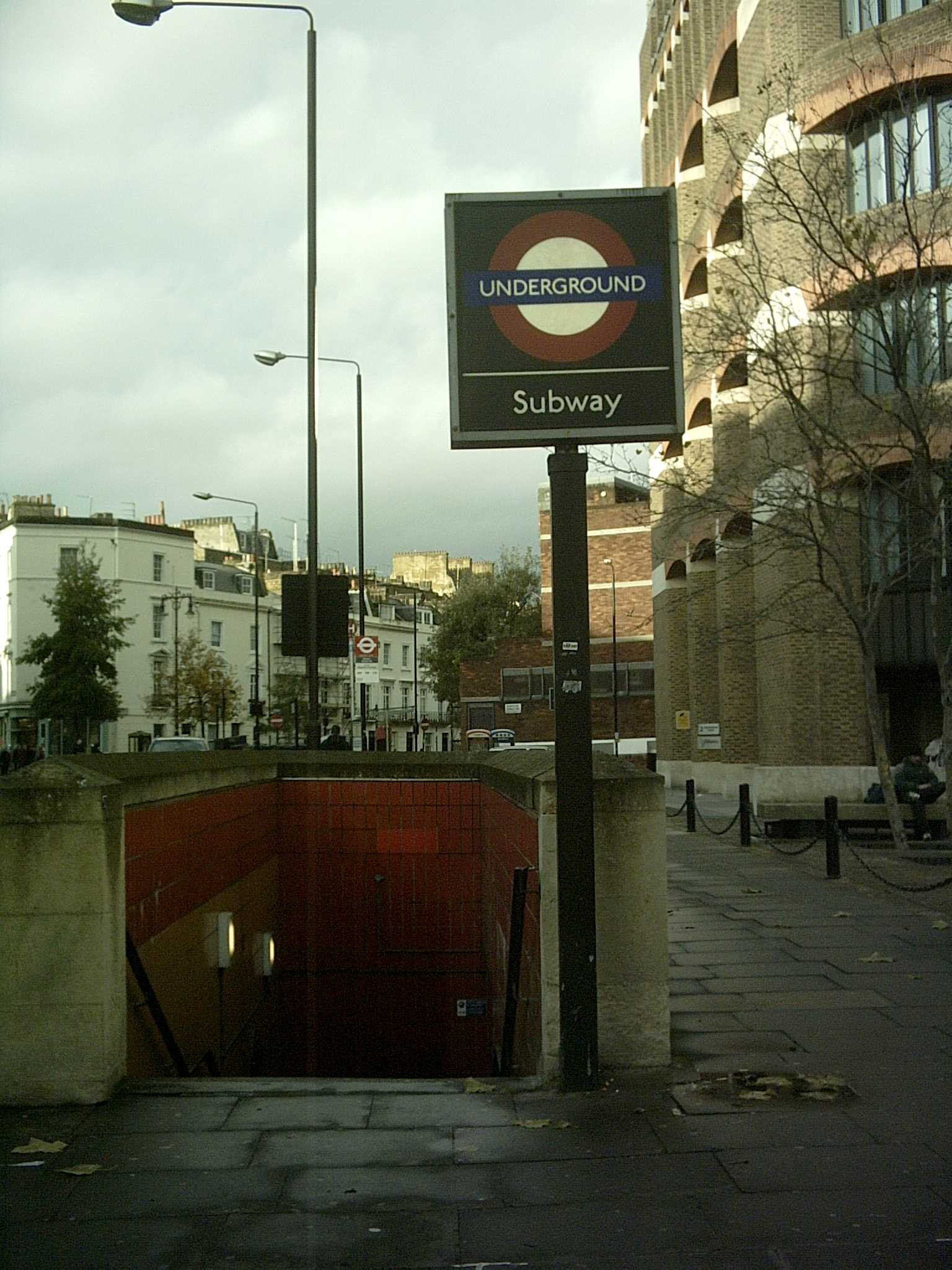
Bessborough Street entrance, 2005

When the extension of the Victoria line to Brixton via Stockwell was approved in 1966, there were discussions about building an additional station between Victoria and the River Thames. It was not included in the original plans for the extension, as there were concerns that it would not be financially viable or support enough footfall. However, there was strong local support for a station as it would better serve the surrounding community, and would immediately improve access to the Tate Gallery (now Tate Britain). The Crown Estate offered free land for a site.

In June 1968, Minister of Transport Richard Marsh approved a proposal to build the station, following work by London Transport that showed "considerable benefits" to the local area, despite the station not being profitable to operate. The extension to Brixton opened on 23 July 1971, but Pimlico station was not yet complete, and trains passed through slowly without stopping.

Construction of the sub-surface works was complicated by the presence of the Kings Scholars Pond Sewer, also known as the Tachbrook, which runs under the road along the southern edge of the ticket hall. Bessborough Street covers a large number of pipes and mains which had to be avoided, while the escalator shaft had to be excavated through water-bearing gravel. As at Vauxhall on the south side of the Thames, the ground had to be frozen to prevent it collapsing during construction.

The station was opened by the Lord Mayor of Westminster on 14 September 1972 – more than a year after the rest of the line had become fully operational – and began serving regular passengers that afternoon. The total estimated cost was £1.4 million. Pimlico was the last Underground station to open until the first section of the Piccadilly line's Heathrow extension was opened to Hatton Cross in 1975. After Blackhorse Road station was re-sited to interchange between what is today the London Overground and the Victoria line in 1981, Pimlico became the only station on the line without any direct connections to any other.

In March 2015, the station was chosen to be the test site station for 'Wayfindr', an app that helps visually impaired people navigate their way through the station using iBeacon devices. The trial was successful, which subsequently led to a $1 million grant from Google, and the app was installed at other stations.

The station was closed in 2020 from 21 March to 18 May in response to the COVID-19 pandemic, when non-essential travel was restricted. In July 2021, the station was temporarily closed again because of a lack of staff, after over 300 Transport for London (TfL) staff self-isolated as a result of COVID.

== Artwork ==
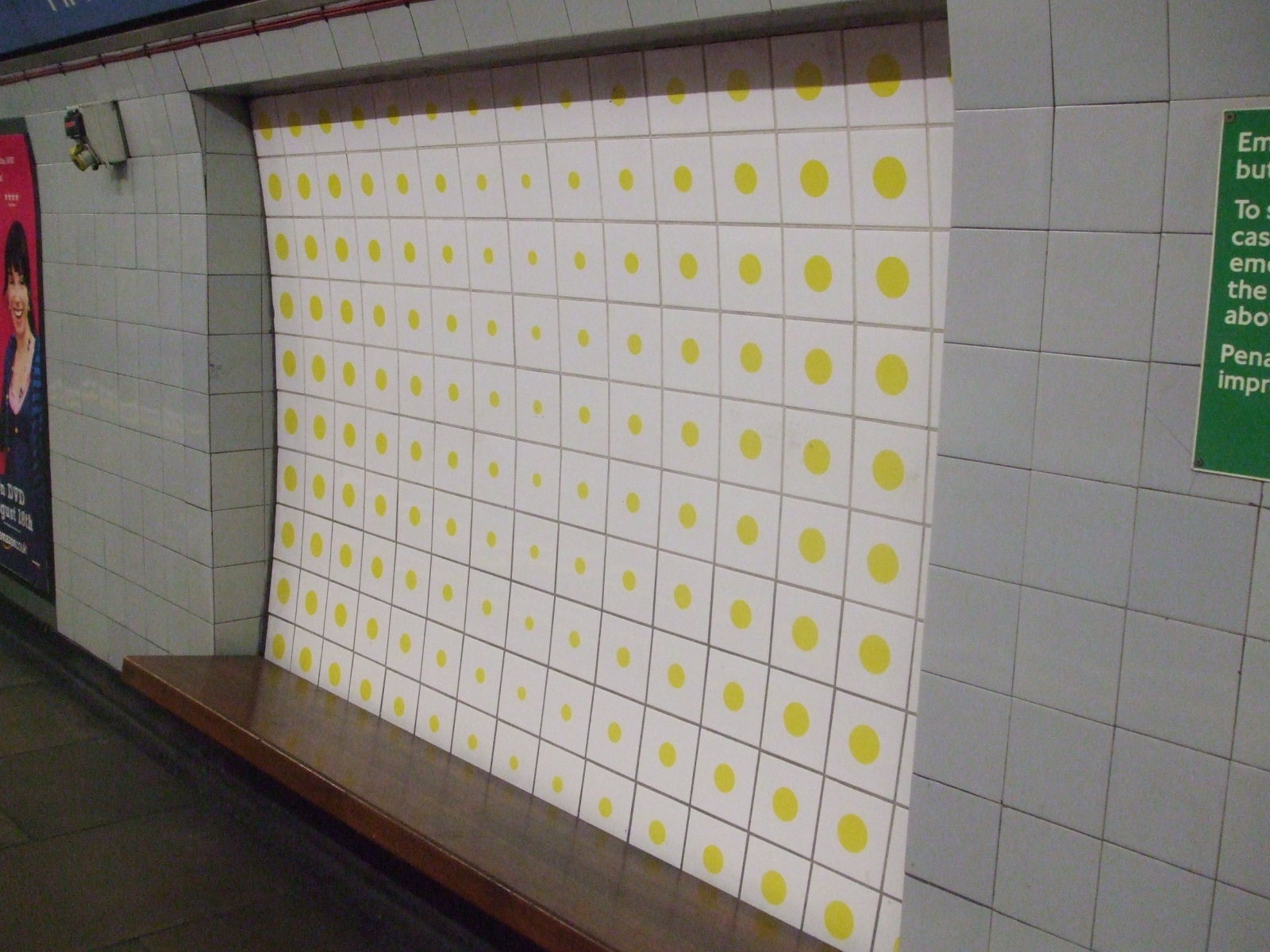
Platform motif – spots representing modern art at the nearby Tate Britain gallery

Along with other stations on the Victoria line, Pimlico station features distinctive artwork motifs in the station building. The platform walls are covered with tiles decorated with a series of op art yellow spots designed by Peter Sedgley, who derived it from his 1968 piece, "Go". Sedgley was chosen by Sir Misha Black, who had formed London Transport's Design Research Unit, which oversaw the design of the whole Victoria Line. Black wanted a contemporary artist to create the tiles for Pimlico, because of its closeness to the Tate Gallery, but Sedgley's request that the tiles should be set in a washable grout was ignored, and the grout has become blacker with time because of the dusty air on the platforms.

A poster by David Booth was installed at the station in 1987 as part of the "Art on the Underground" series. It features the various underground lines as paint squeezed from a tube, with the tube itself positioned at Pimlico. The poster has become well known, and has been reprinted on a number of occasions. It is now held at the London Transport Museum in Covent Garden.

== Incidents ==
On 1 December 2019, a passenger was killed after being hit by a train. The station was evacuated and services suspended on the Victoria line between Victoria and Brixton.

In 2023, a cat was discovered hiding on the Victoria line at Pimlico by train drivers. The cat had been transported to the UK from Dubai for rehoming but had been abandoned at the station. After several attempts, he was rescued two weeks later.

Preceding station	London Underground	Following station
Vauxhall towards Brixton	Victoria line	Victoria towards Walthamstow Central
