= Institution of Incorporated Engineers =

UK organization

The Institution of Incorporated Engineers (IIE) was a multidisciplinary engineering institution in the United Kingdom. In 2006 it merged with the Institution of Electrical Engineers (IEE) to form the Institution of Engineering and Technology (IET). Before the merger the IIE had approximately 40,000 members. The IET is now the second largest engineering society in the world next to the IEEE. The IET has the authority to establish professional registration of engineers (Chartered Engineer or Incorporated Engineer) through the Engineering Council. The IEEE does not have the authority to replicate the registration process in its complementary environment.

== History ==
The IIE traces its heritage to the Vulcanic Society that was founded in 1884. The Vulcanic Society was formed by a group of apprentices from the works of Maudslay, Son & Field Ltd, in Lambeth, London. This society went through three name changes before it became the Junior Institution of Engineers in 1902, which became the Institution of General Technician Engineers in 1970 and the Institute of Mechanical and General Technician Engineers (IMGTechE) in 1976. In 1982 the IMGTechE and Institution of Technician Engineers in Mechanical Engineering (ITEME) merged to form the Institution of Mechanical Incorporated Engineers (IMechIE).

The Institution of Electrical and Electronic Incorporated Engineers (IEEIE) and the Society of Electronic and Radio Technicians (SERT) merged in 1990 to form the Institution of Electronics and Electrical Incorporated Engineers (IEEIE).

The IIE was formed in April 1998 by the merger of the IMechIE, the IEEIE and The Institute of Engineers and Technicians (IET). In 1999, the Institution of Incorporated Executive Engineers (IIExE) merged with the IIE.

In October 2001, IIE received a Royal Charter in recognition of the significant contribution of its members to the UK economy and society.

In 2005, the Society of Engineers also merged with the IIE.

== Formation of the IET ==
Discussions started in 2004 between the IEE and the IIE about the formation of a new institution, the Institution of Engineering and Technology. Following members voting in favour of the merger, the IET became operational on 31 March 2006.
