= List of public art in the London Borough of Redbridge =

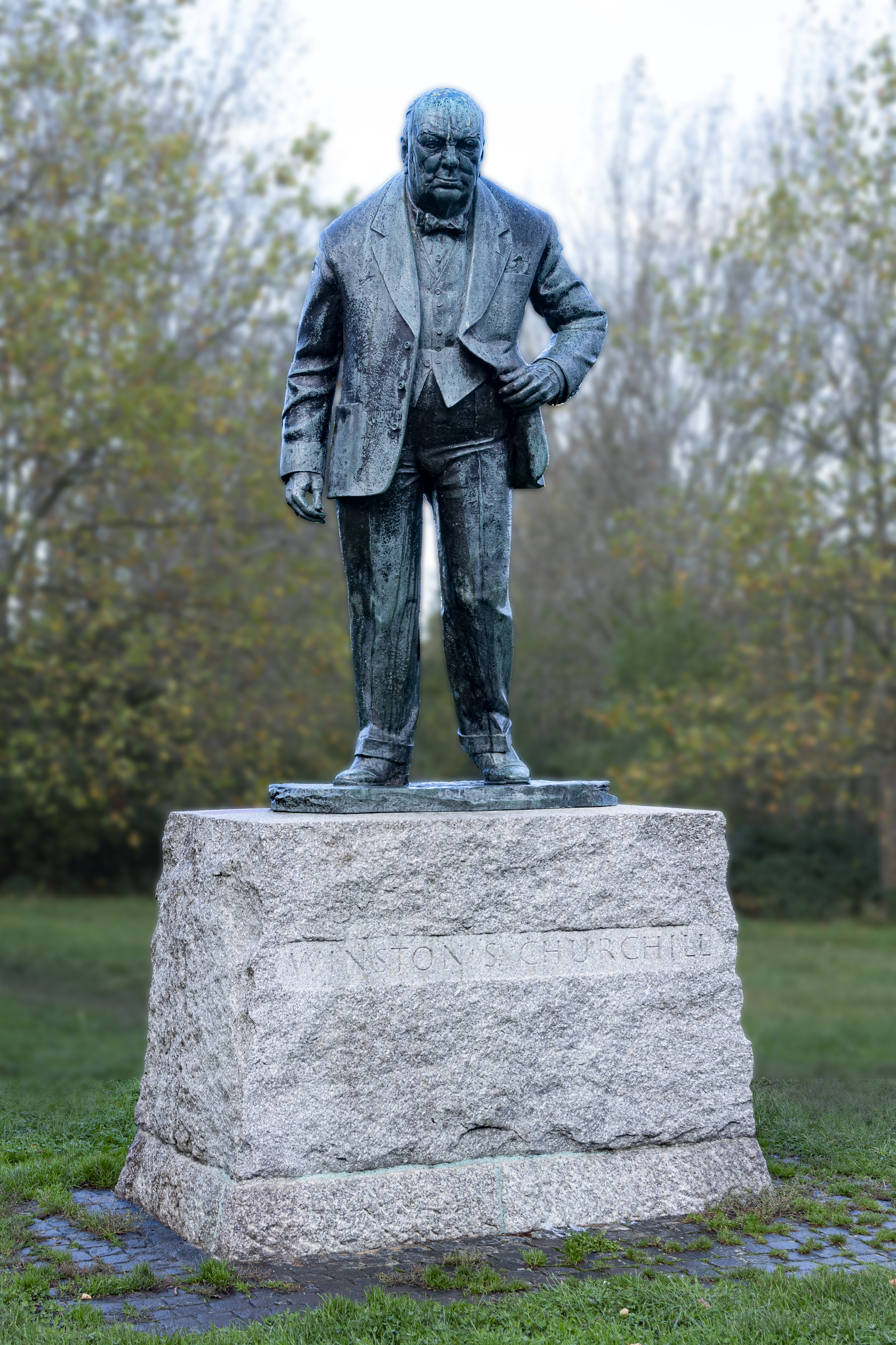
The statue of Winston Churchill on Woodford Green (David McFall, 1959)

This is a list of public art in the London Borough of Redbridge.

== Aldborough ==
Image	Title / subject	Location and coordinates	Date	Artist / designer	Type	Designation	Notes
	Fairlop Waters Commemorative Sculpture	Fairlop Waters 51.5955°N 0.0975°E	2013	Unknown	War memorial / Sculpture	—	Commemorates people who served at Fairlop and Hainault airfields during the First and Second World Wars. Commissioned by Vision Redbridge Culture & Leisure, and unveiled by the Mayor of Redbridge on 11 November 2013.

== Barkingside ==
Image	Title / subject	Location and coordinates	Date	Artist / designer	Type	Designation	Notes
More images	Memorial to Thomas John Barnardo	Tanners Lane 51.5860°N 0.0843°E	1908	George Frampton	Exedra with sculpture	Grade II*	Unveiled by the Duchess of Albany, the memorial is on the site where Dr Barnardo's ashes had been interred in 1905.

== Chadwell Heath ==
Image	Title / subject	Location and coordinates	Date	Artist / designer	Type	Designation	Notes
	Elizabeth line Clock	Chadwell Heath railway station 51.5680°N 0.1287°E	2024		Clock	—	Marks the arrival of the Elizabeth line at the station. The clock is made by the Swiss company Mobatime and has roundels inspired by station clocks on the Central line.

== Gants Hill ==
Image	Title / subject	Location and coordinates	Date	Artist / designer	Type	Designation	Notes
	Beacon	Gants Hill roundabout 51.57614°N 0.06593°E	2004	Chloe Cookson and Rory McNally	Sculpture	—	Created with children from Gearies Infant School.
	The Vortex	Gants Hill roundabout 51.5765°N 0.0664°E	2015	Wolfgang Buttress	Sculpture	—	Installed in March 2015.

== Goodmayes ==
Image	Title / subject	Location and coordinates	Date	Artist / designer	Type	Designation	Notes
	Spectrum	Goodmayes Hospital 51.5763°N 0.1105°E	2015	Anna Heinrich and Leon Palmer	Sculpture	—	Designed to reflect differing perceptions of mental health.

== Hainault ==
Image	Title / subject	Location and coordinates	Date	Artist / designer	Type	Designation	Notes
More images	Hainault War Memorial	Hainault Library, Manford Way 51.6081°N 0.1044°E	2010	?	Obelisk	—	Dedicated 31 October 2010.

== Ilford ==
Image	Title / subject	Location and coordinates	Date	Artist / designer	Type	Designation	Notes
More images	Ilford War Memorial	Memorial Park, Eastern Avenue 51.5747°N 0.0877°E	1922	Newbury Abbot Trent	War memorial with statue	Grade II	Unveiled 22 November 1922 by Princess Louise, Duchess of Argyll. Another casting of the statue of a soldier is at Tredegar, south Wales.
	Holocaust Memorial British survivors of the Holocaust, and specifically Leon Greenman	Valentines Park	2002	Issy Hahn	Memorial	—	
	Bishops Walk Mosaic	Bishops Walk, Valentines Park 51.5725°N 0.0701°E	2008	Gary Drostle	Porcelain floor mosaic	—	
	Pioneers Gate	Winston Way	2010–2012	Nils Folke Anderson	Sculpture	—	
	Redbridge Peace Monument	Winston Way Subway, Riches Road 51.5593°N 0.0781°E	2011	Gary Drostle	Peace column with a myriad of different cultural motifs in mosaic with a gold mosaic cone on top representing hope.	—	Unveiled November 2011 by Wilson Chowdhry, Chairman of the British Pakistani Christian Association, and the mother of the murdered teenager Kashif Mahmood who was killed five years earlier at the same location.
	Glass panel	Valentines Park	2012	?	Freestanding glass panel	—	
	Rushes	Valentines Park	2012	Fiona Heron	Sculpture	—	
	Owl	Valentines Park	2019	Natural Garden Sculptures	Tree carving	—	Carved from a sycamore tree, this marks the 10th anniversary of the restoration of Valentines Park.
	Quadrilateral box	Valentines Park	?	?	Sculpture	—	

== Leytonstone ==
Image	Title / subject	Location and coordinates	Date	Artist / designer	Type	Designation	Notes
More images	The High Stone	Woodford Road 51.5744°N 0.0176°E	19th century	?	Obelisk	Grade II	

== Snaresbrook ==
Image	Title / subject	Location and coordinates	Date	Artist / designer	Type	Designation	Notes
	Drinking fountain	Junction of High Street and Hollybush Hill 51.5818°N 0.0203°E	1872	?	Drinking fountain	Grade II	

== South Woodford ==
Image	Title / subject	Location and coordinates	Date	Artist / designer	Type	Designation	Notes
More images	Woodford War Memorial	St Mary's churchyard 51.5979°N 0.0208°E	After 1918	Reginald Blomfield	Cross of Sacrifice	—	
	Flowers	The Shrubberies / George Lane	2003	Nicola Burrell	Sculptures	—	
	Benches and three tree sculptures Winston Churchill, Sylvia Pankhurst and William Morris	High Road	2012	Tim Ward / Circling the Square	Benches and sculptures	—	

== Wanstead ==
Image	Title / subject	Location and coordinates	Date	Artist / designer	Type	Designation	Notes
	Wanstead War Memorial	Memorial Green, Wanstead 51.579687°N 0.023656°E	1920s	Newbury Abbot Trent	War memorial with statue	Grade II	
	Bust of Winston Churchill	Manor House, High Street 51.57649°N 0.02758°E	1968	Luigi Fironi	Bust	—	Unveiled 12 August 1968. The Manor House was formerly the home of the West Essex Conservative Club, which was frequented by Churchill. The plinth is a corner stone from the 19th-century Waterloo Bridge.

== Woodford Green ==
Image	Title / subject	Location and coordinates	Date	Artist / designer	Type	Designation	Notes
More images	The Sweep Obelisk	Broomhill Walk 51.6036°N 0.0193°E	Late 19th century	?	Obelisk	Grade II	
	Woodford Green War Memorial	St Barnabas' churchyard 51.6076°N 0.0387°E	1920	Sir Charles Nicholson, 2nd Baronet	Hooded Calvary cross	Grade II	
More images	Anti–Air War Memorial	Outside Highbeam House, 581–587 High Road 51.6170°N 0.0257°E	1935	Eric Benfield	Memorial	Grade II	Commissioned and erected by the suffragist and socialist Sylvia Pankhurst, this was Britain's first anti-war memorial. Restored in 2014.
More images	Statue of Winston Churchill	Junction of High Road and Broomhill Walk 51.6040°N 0.0191°E	1959	David McFall	Statue	Grade II	Unveiled 7 November 1959 by Field Marshal Montgomery, with Winston and Clementine Churchill in attendance. A photograph of the statue's head at an early stage drew criticism for its supposedly "gorilla-like" appearance.
