= St Thomas of Canterbury Church, Woodford Green =

St Thomas of Canterbury Church
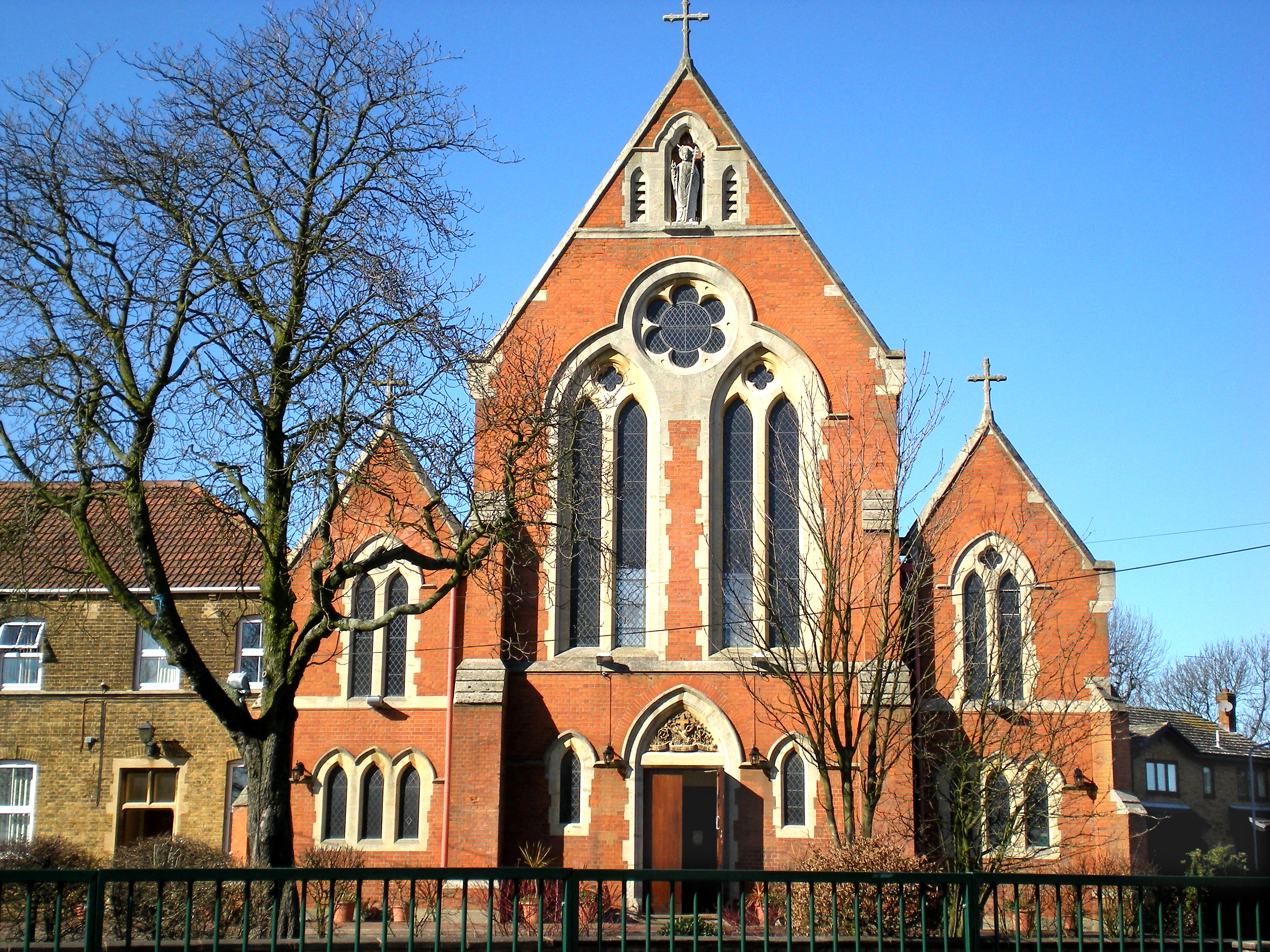
- St Thomas of Canterbury Church
- 51.61521°N 0.02456°E
- Location: Woodford, London
- Country: England
- Denomination: Roman Catholic
- Religious institute: Order of Friars Minor
- Website: stthomaswoodford.org

History
- Founded: March 1894
- Dedication: Thomas Becket
- Consecrated: 7 July 1896

Architecture
- Architect: Alexander Scoles
- Style: Gothic Revival
- Groundbreaking: 18 May 1895
- Completed: 24 May 1896
- Construction cost: £10,000

Administration
- Province: Westminster
- Diocese: Brentwood
- Deanery: Waltham Forest
- Parish: Woodford Green

St Thomas of Canterbury Church is a Roman Catholic parish church in Woodford Green, Woodford, London. It was built from 1895 to 1896, was designed by Alexander Scoles and has been served by the Franciscan Order of Friars Minor since its foundation. It is located on Woodford Green road next to Trinity Catholic High School. It was funded by Henrietta Pelham-Clinton, Duchess of Newcastle, who also paid for the friary, a primary school, a school for girls, a house for the Poor Servants of the Mother of God, and is buried in the church.

== History ==
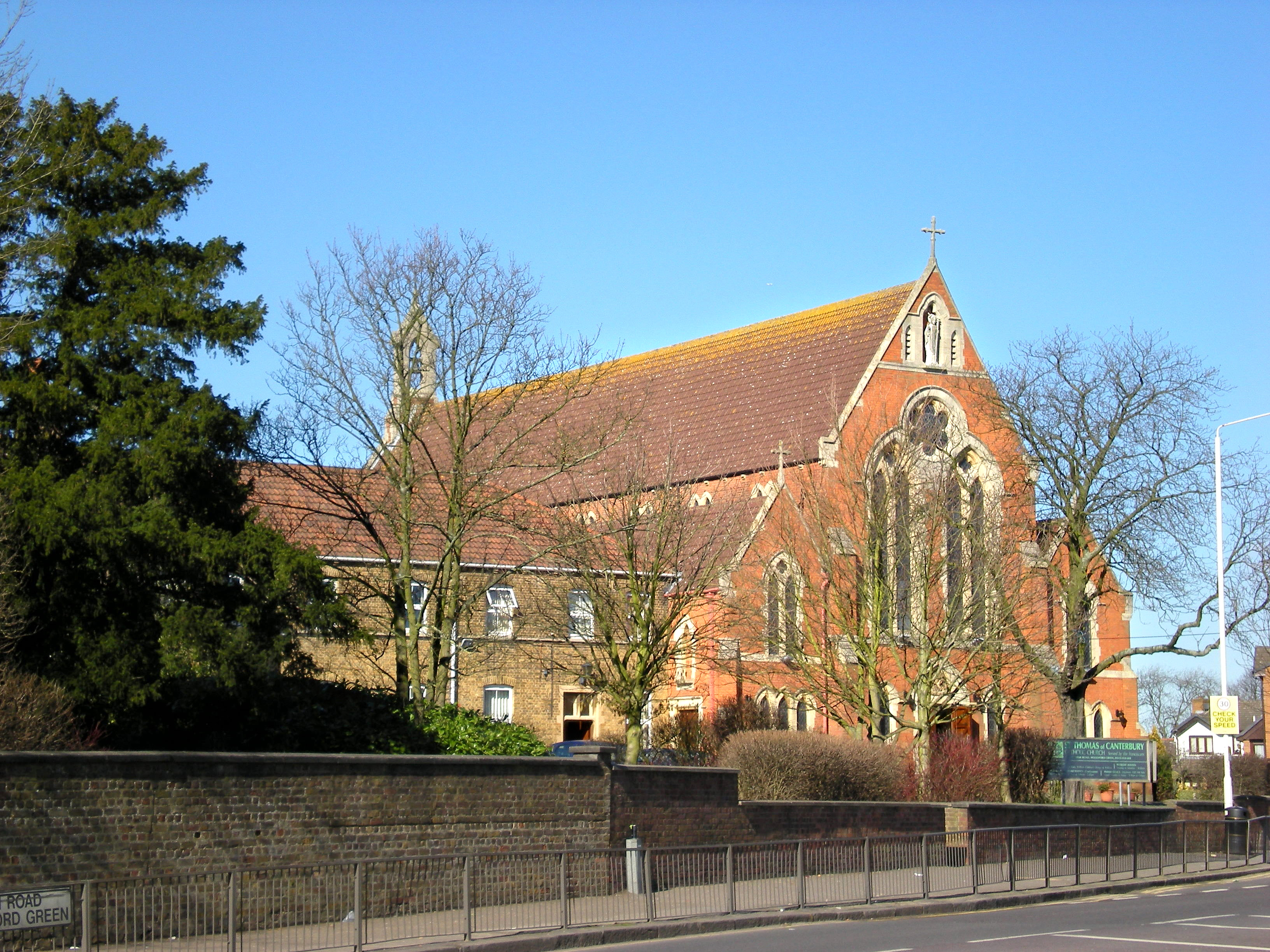
Church exterior

=== Foundation ===
In March 1878, the Franciscan Friars started an appeal for creating a mission in Woodford Green. In 1879, the Duchess of Newcastle, Henrietta Pelham-Clinton, daughter of Henry Thomas Hope and wife of Henry Pelham-Clinton, 6th Duke of Newcastle converted to Catholicism. She was in the Third Order of Saint Francis. In 1893, she discussed starting a mission with the Archbishop of Westminster Cardinal Vaughan. Together, they planned the construction of a church, friary, schools and house for religious sisters. In 1894, she bought three houses in the area that would provide the foundation of the parish, one for the Poor Servants of the Mother of God to teach at a school, one temporarily for the friars to the north, and The Oaks, in the grounds of which, the present church, friary and Trinity Catholic High School would be built. In March 1894, the parish was founded when the first Catholic church in the area since the Reformation was built. It was a temporary iron church, built in the garden of the house for the friars to the north of Woodford Green.

=== Construction ===
In April 1895, the priest and architect, Alexander Scoles was commissioned to design St Thomas of Canterbury Church and the friary. On 18 May 1895, the foundation stone of the church was laid by Cardinal Vaughan. On 24 May 1896, the church was opened for its first Mass. The builders were Goddard & Sons of Dorking and Farnham and the total construction cost was £10,000, all paid for by the Duchess of Newcastle. She cleared the debt of the church, and it was consecrated on 7 July 1896.

=== Developments ===
On 8 May 1913, the Duchess died and on 2 June 1913 she was buried in the church, in the chapel of St Francis. After the Duchess' death, Poor Clare Sisters moved into the Oaks. In 1931, a new property was bought to be used for a parish centre. In the 1970s, many changes happened in the parish. In 1970, the Poor Clares left. In 1972, the old parish centre was demolished. In 1974, the Oaks was demolished and it was replaced by houses. In the 1980s, the southwest wing of the friary was renovated and became the new parish centre, the Becket Centre.

== Parish ==
The Franciscan Friars continue to serve the church and they have their UK office in the friary. The church has four Sunday Masses at 6:00pm on Saturday and at 8:30am, 10:00am and 11:30am on Sunday.

== See also ==
- Media related to St Thomas of Canterbury Church, Woodford Green at Wikimedia Commons
- Diocese of Brentwood
