= Woodford Bridge =

Area of Woodford, London, England

Coordinates: 51.606504°N 0.055747°E

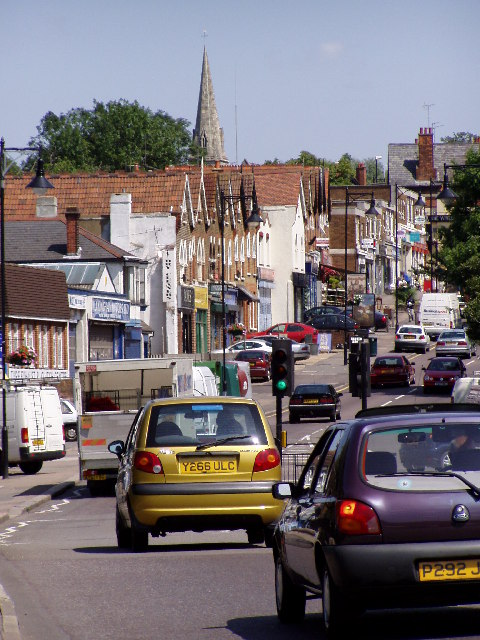
- High Road, Woodford Bridge

- Location within Greater London
- London borough: Redbridge
- Ceremonial county: Greater London
- Region: London
- Country: England
- Sovereign state: United Kingdom
- Post town: WOODFORD GREEN
- Postcode district: IG8
- Dialling code: 020
- Police: Metropolitan
- Fire: London
- Ambulance: London
- London Assembly: Havering and Redbridge

Woodford Bridge is part of the East London suburb of Woodford, in the London Borough of Redbridge. It is on an old road between Chigwell and Leytonstone.

== History ==
The area now known as Woodford Bridge lies at the point where a minor Roman, and later Saxon, road crossed the River Roding at a fording point. The route can be traced along what is now Roding Lane North, before continuing through Claybury Park, Chigwell, and Abridge, eventually on to Great Dunmow. The name Woodford derives from this once-wooded crossing, which was replaced by a bridge by 1239. At that time, the River Roding was navigable for light barges as far as Abridge, making it a modest route for river transport.

The parish was under the control of the Abbot of Waltham from Saxon times until the 16th century.

=== The bridge ===
The bridge at Woodford was a wooden horse bridge until 1573, when the lord of the manor agreed to replace it with a wooden cart bridge. In 1768, a stone bridge - originally planned in 1752 - was built, but it was destroyed by floods and rebuilt in 1771. This version consisted of three semi-circular arches of brown brick with stone rustications. It was replaced in 1962 by a new, wider concrete bridge.

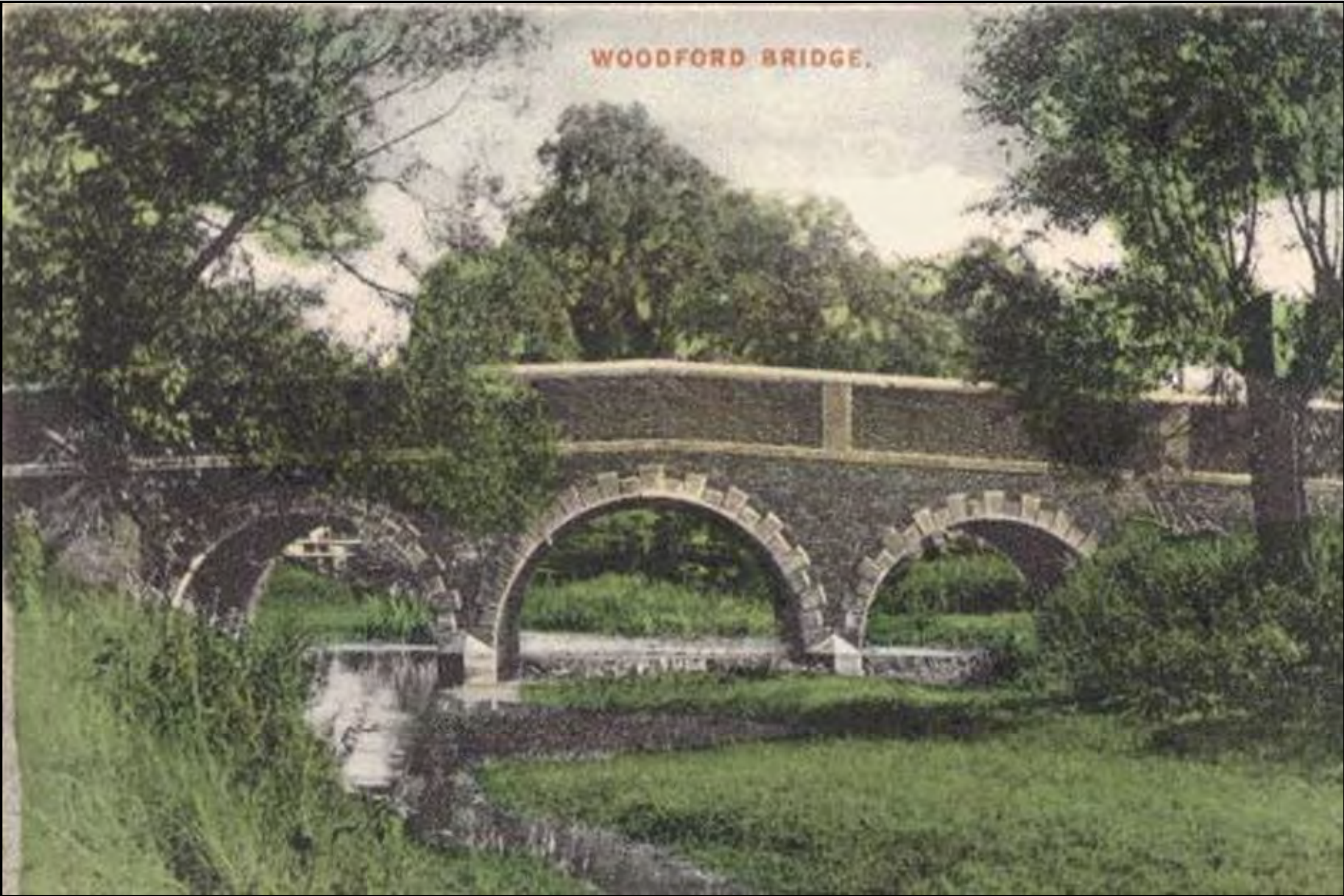
Postcard of the stone bridge built in 1771 at Woodford Bridge

=== Artificial slate industry ===
In 1797, Sir James Wright, a former British diplomat to Venice, established an artificial slate manufactory in Woodford Bridge. Wright held a patent for the production of artificial slate and used it to construct the manufactory buildings themselves. The enterprise, based on Italian techniques Wright had learned in Venice, was not commercially successful and closed after several years. Wright lived nearby at Ray House.

=== Local inns ===
Three inns developed in the Woodford Bridge area: the White Hart, the Crown and Crooked Billet, and later, the Three Jolly Wheelers. The White Hart was rebuilt around 1900 with an ornate frontage, while the Crown and Crooked Billet retains its late-18th-century structure, albeit much altered. The Three Jolly Wheelers was established between 1828 and 1848.

=== 19th and 20th century expansion ===
Woodford Bridge gradually developed from a hamlet into a suburban area. By 1854, it had become an ecclesiastical district, and by 1871 its population was recorded at 1,188. Woodford railway station opened in 1856 as part of the Eastern Counties Railway, later incorporated into the Central line. The arrival of the railway and extensive house building during the early 20th century led to rapid suburban expansion, peaking in the 1930s when around 1,600 houses were being built annually across the wider Woodford area.

=== Barnardo’s Garden City for Boys ===
Woodford Bridge was home to the Barnardo’s Garden City for Boys, opened in 1912. The 50-acre site was purchased by the Dr Barnardo’s Homes foundation in 1909 and could accommodate around 700 boys from destitute backgrounds. The home consisted of cottage-style buildings set within gardens, each overseen by a matron “mother” figure with the boys being her “sons”. The complex also included a chapel, hospital, library, club rooms, swimming pool, bakery, and sports fields for football and cricket. The Barnardo’s Garden City closed in 1977.

== Notable features ==
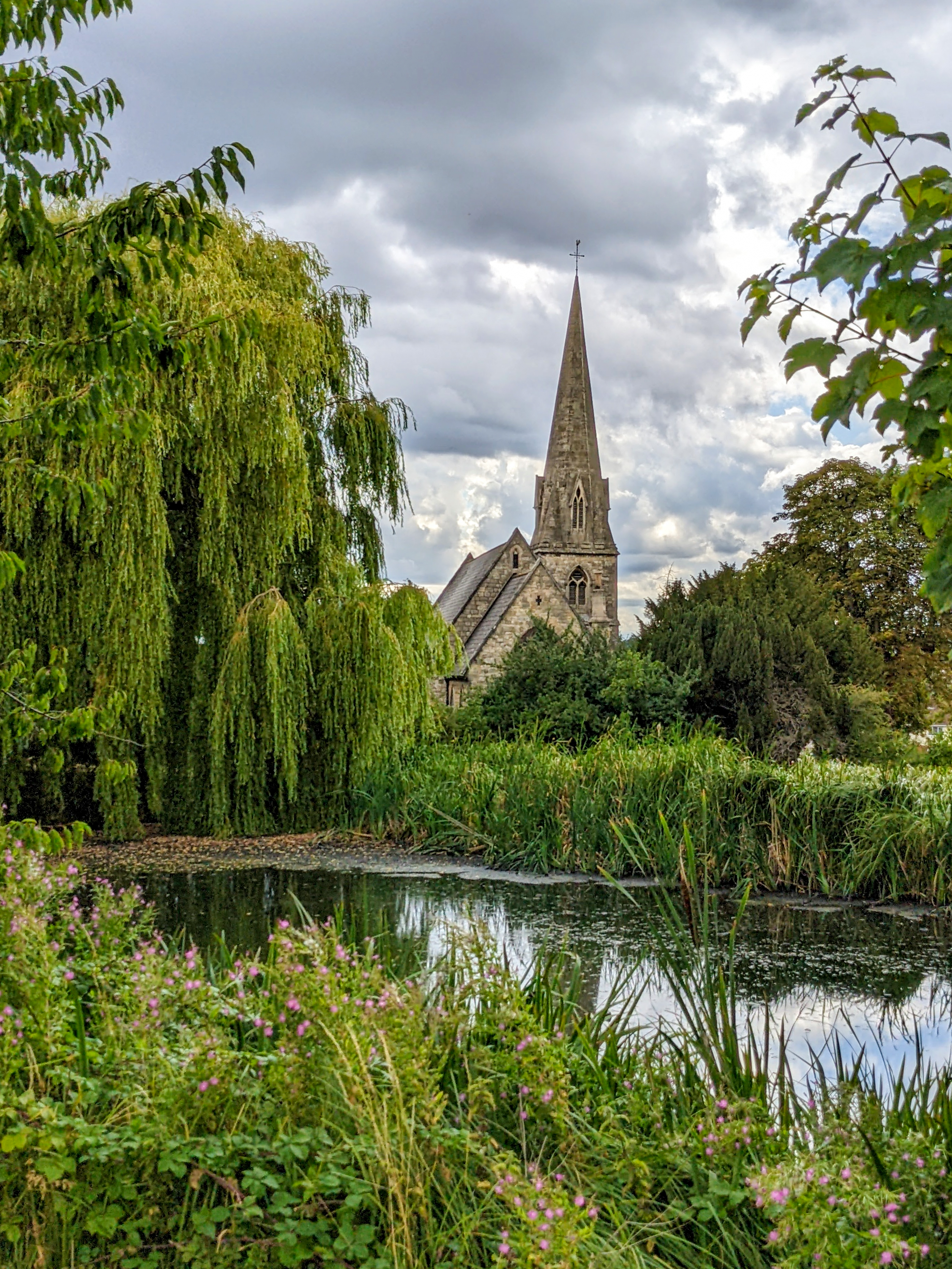
St Paul's Church

Its notable features include St Paul's Church, Woodford Bridge, which offers a variety of services and a nearby pond located 100 metres to the right. The population expansion in the area had led the ancient parish church of St Mary's Church, Woodford to rent an infant school for services in 1851. A permanent church was built in 1854 as a district chapelry. It suffered a fire in 1886, after which it was rebuilt in a Neo-Gothic version of the Decorated style.

There is a small primary school and nursery, Roding Primary School. There are also local amenities, including supermarkets, restaurants and cafes.

== Transportation ==
Woodford Bridge is served by London Buses routes 275 and W12. The 275 connects to Barkingside, Woodford Station (Central Line), Woodford Green, Highams Park and Walthamstow. The W12 connects to South Woodford tube station, Snaresbrook, Wanstead, Leytonstone, Whipps Cross and Walthamstow. Route W14 runs every 1 hour (Whipps Cross to Loughton via Buckhurst Hill), the closest bus stop from Woodford Bridge is located on Chigwell Road.

The closest station is Woodford. It is served by the Central Line and located approximately 1 mile from Woodford Bridge. Trains run towards West Ruislip and Ealing Broadway via Central London. And eastbound services towards Epping. This station is the start of the ‘Hainault loop’. Services run from Woodford to Hainault via Chigwell and Grange Hill every 20 minutes.
