= Woodford Green =

Area of Woodford, London, England

Coordinates: 51.605°N 0.020°E

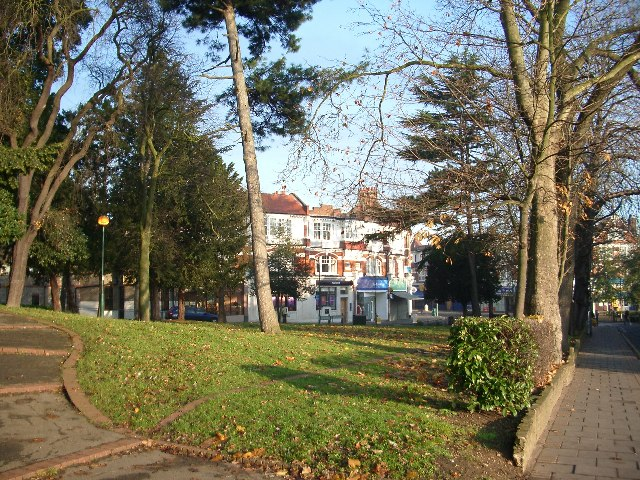
- Woodford Green Broadway

- Location within Greater London
- OS grid reference: TQ405915
- London borough: Redbridge; Waltham Forest
- Ceremonial county: Greater London
- Region: London
- Country: England
- Sovereign state: United Kingdom
- Post town: WOODFORD GREEN
- Postcode district: IG8
- Dialling code: 020
- Police: Metropolitan
- Fire: London
- Ambulance: London
- UK Parliament: Chingford and Woodford Green
- London Assembly: Havering and Redbridge; North East

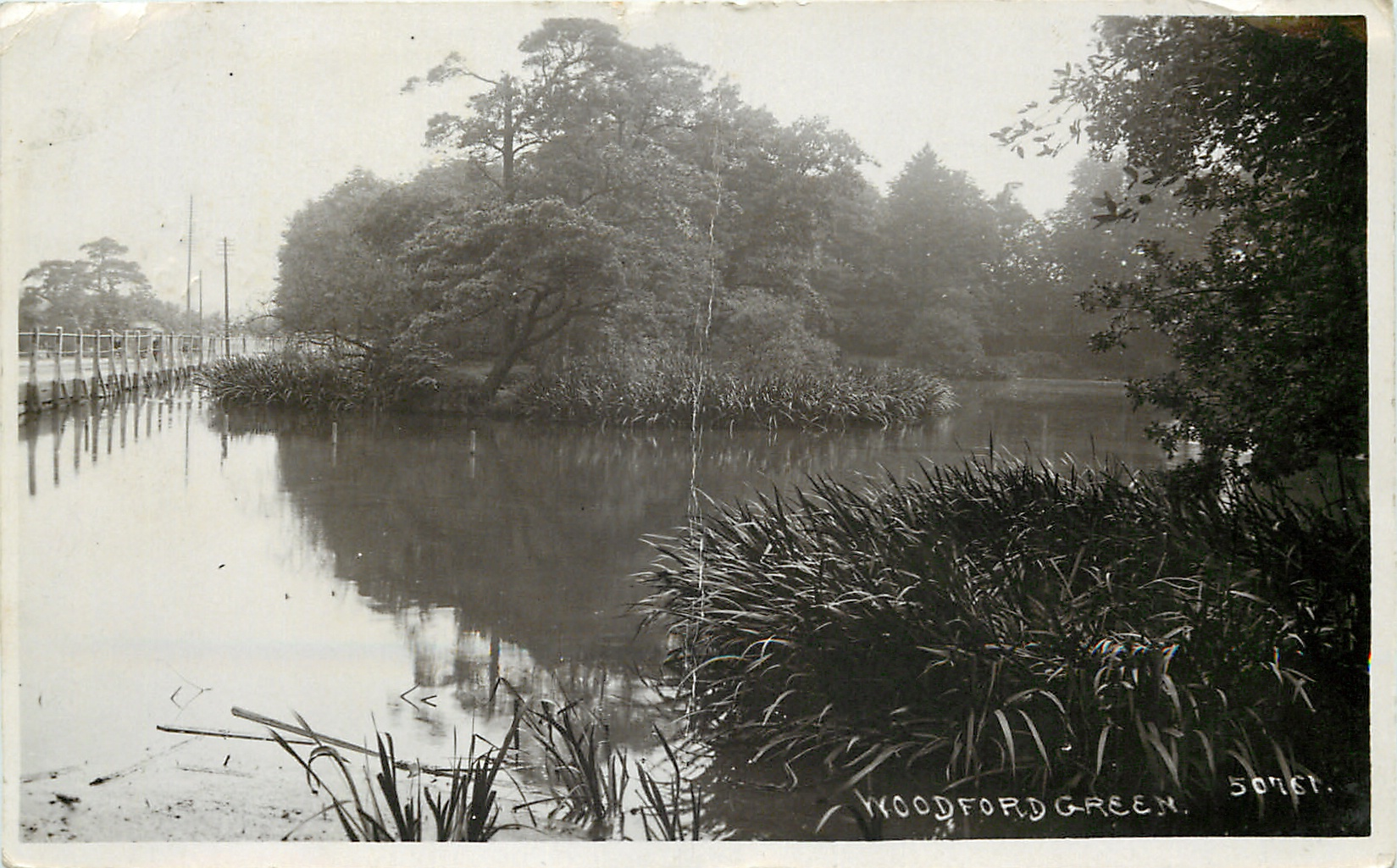
Woodford Green, from a postcard sent in 1913

Woodford Green is an affluent area of Woodford in East London, England, within the London Borough of Redbridge. It adjoins Buckhurst Hill to the north, Woodford Bridge to the east, South Woodford to the south, and Chingford to the west. Epping Forest runs through Woodford Green in the west of the area, 9.4 miles (15.1 km) north-east of Charing Cross.

It was a hamlet in the ancient parish of Woodford, in the historic county of Essex, becoming an urban district in 1894. For administrative purposes, this merged with the Wanstead Urban District to form the Wanstead and Woodford Urban District in 1934. In 1965, the urban district became part of the London Borough of Redbridge.

== Toponymy ==
The locality takes its name from the Green, an area of open common land—a part of Epping Forest—beside which the area first developed.

== Politics ==
Woodford Green is part of the Parliamentary constituency of Chingford and Woodford Green, represented since its creation in 1997 by Iain Duncan Smith, leader of the Conservative Party from 2001 to 2003. He was Secretary of State for Work and Pensions from 2010 to 2016. Duncan Smith is a successor of Sir Winston Churchill, who was also MP for this area and is commemorated by a statue on Woodford Green erected in 1959.

In the 1920s and 1930s, Clement Attlee, later Labour Prime Minister from 1945 to 1951, lived in Woodford Green, the seat of his political adversary, Winston Churchill. A blue plaque records the fact on a house in Monkhams Avenue.

Sylvia Pankhurst lived in Woodford Green from 1924 to 1956, originally in the High Road, and from 1933 in Charteris Road. In 1935, Pankhurst commissioned and dedicated a memorial in Woodford High Road to the victims of Italian aerial bombing in Ethiopia, known as the Anti-Air War Memorial.

== Sport ==
=== Cricket ===
Woodford Green Cricket Club was founded in 1735. It plays alongside the High Road. The club has teams for all age groups with the senior teams playing in the Hamro Essex League.

=== Athletics ===
Woodford Green with Essex Ladies is one of the leading British athletics clubs and is based at Ashton Fields. The club topped Division 1 of the British Athletics League for the first time in 2005.

== Education ==
=== Primary schools ===
- Avon House Preparatory School (Independent)
- Churchfields Infants School
- Churchfields Junior School
- Bancroft's Preparatory School
- Ray Lodge Primary School
- St Antony's Catholic Primary School
- St Aubyn's School
- Woodford Green Preparatory School
- Wells Primary School
- Woodford Green Primary
- St. Joseph's Convent School
- Roding Primary School

=== Secondary schools ===
- Bancroft's School, Woodford Green, (Independent)
- Trinity Catholic High School
- Woodbridge High School
- Woodford County High School for Girls

=== Special needs schools ===
- Hatton School

== Demography ==
Woodford Green is represented by the Monkhams electoral ward in the London Borough of Redbridge. It ranks as one of the highest income areas of Greater London.

== Notable people ==
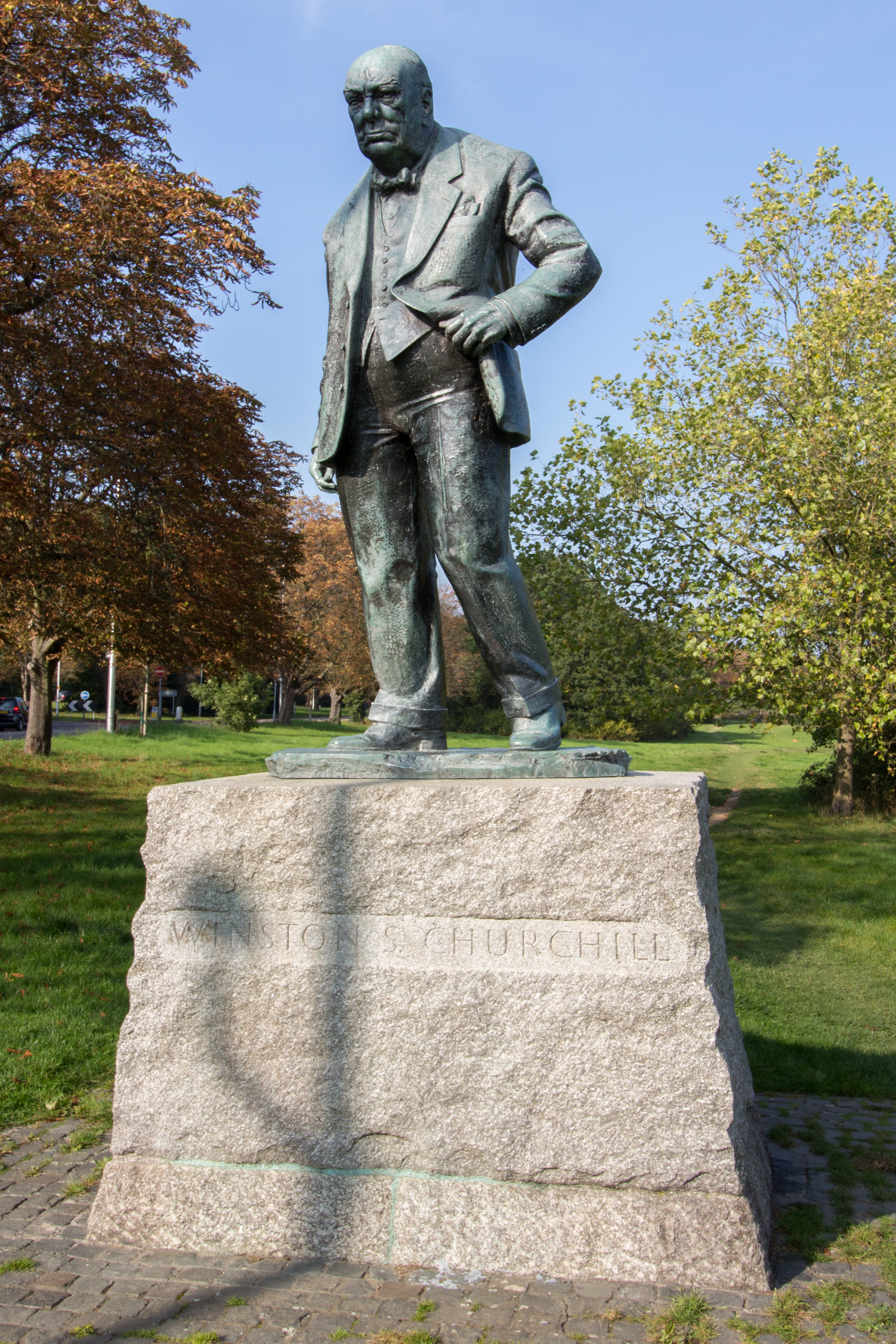
Winston Churchill was MP for Epping (1924–1945) and Wanstead and Woodford (1945–1964), both of which included Woodford. He is commemorated by a statue on Woodford Green.

- Clement Attlee, Labour Prime Minister (1945–1951)
- Nick Browne, cricketer
- Philip Burnell, cricketer
- Sir Winston Churchill, Conservative Prime Minister (1940–1945, 1951–1955)
- Harris Dickinson, actor
- Lynn Fontanne, actress
- James Hilton, author
- Alfred Horsley Hinton, photographer
- Stuart Kuttner, managing editor of the News of the World
- Barry Lamb, experimental musician, composer
- Louisa Leaman, author
- Michael Norgrove, boxer
- Kele Okereke, Bloc Party musician
- Sylvia Pankhurst, suffragette
- Gipsy Smith, evangelist
- Tony Robinson, actor and TV personality
- Alan Thurlow, organist
- Kate Williams, actress, Woodford resident during the making of the TV series Love Thy Neighbour
- Tulay Goren, a 15-year-old Turkish Kurd who was murdered by her father in a so-called Honour Killing for having an affair with an older man from a different branch of Islam.

== Transport and locale ==
=== Roads and buses ===
The A104 runs through Woodford Green and forms its High Street while Chigwell Road, the A113, runs along the east side with Broadmead Road connecting the two. Woodford Green is served by Woodford tube station.

Various London Buses routes also connect Woodford Green with nearby major towns:

Route number	Route	Serving in Woodford Green	Operator
20	Walthamstow Central station to Debden tube station via Whipps Cross, Loughton	Woodford New Road, High Road (The Green)	Stagecoach London
179	Chingford Station to Ilford High Road via South Woodford	Whitehall Road, High Road (The Green), High Road Woodford Green	Stagecoach London
275	St James Street railway station to Barkingside Tesco via Highams Park, Woodford	Chingford Lane, Broadmead Road, Woodford Station	Stagecoach London
397	South Chingford Sainsbury's to Debden Broadway via Chingford, Loughton	Whitehall Road	Stagecoach London
W13	Woodford Wells Horse & Well to Leytonstone station via Wanstead	High Road (The Green), High Road Woodford Green	Stagecoach London (See route N55 for a night service)
N55 Night Bus	Woodford Wells Horse & Well to Oxford Circus via Leytonstone	High Road (The Green), High Road Woodford Green	Stagecoach London

=== Nearest places ===
- Chingford
- South Woodford
- Woodford Bridge
- Woodford Wells
- Wanstead
- Loughton
- Leytonstone
- Roding Valley
- Barkingside
- Chigwell
- Buckhurst Hill
- Walthamstow
- Highams Park
- Clayhall

The nearest London Underground stations are Woodford, South Woodford and Roding Valley on the Central line.

== See also ==
- St Thomas of Canterbury Church, Woodford Green
