= All Saints Church, Woodford Wells =

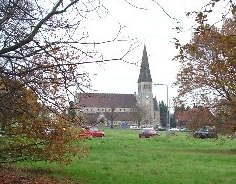
- All Saints Church, Woodford Wells
- 51.6142°N 0.0263°E
- Location: Inmans Row, Woodford Green, Greater London, IG8 0NH
- Country: England
- Denomination: Church of England
- Churchmanship: Charismatic evangelical
- Website: www.asww.org.uk

History
- Status: Active

Architecture
- Functional status: Parish church

Administration
- Diocese: Diocese of Chelmsford
- Archdeaconry: Archdeaconry of West Ham
- Deanery: Redbridge
- Parish: All Saints Woodford Wells

Clergy
- Vicar: The Revd Paul Harcourt

All Saints Church is a Church of England parish church in Woodford Wells, London.

== History ==
Population expansion in the area had led the ancient parish church of St Mary's Church, Woodford to build All Saints, which opened in 1874 and was designed by F. E. C. Streatfeild. A north aisle was added in 1876 and a choir vestry in 1885.

In 1875 All Saints was granted a consolidated chapelry using parts of the parishes of St Mary's and St Peter-in-the-Forest, Walthamstow, and in 1906 it became a parish of its own.

=== Present day ===
In 1979, the church was designated a Grade II listed building. All Saints stands in the Charismatic evangelical tradition of the Church of England.
