= Woodford Green Preparatory School =

Location
- Glengall Road; Snakes Lane West; Woodford Green, Essex, IG8 0BZ; England; 51.60867°N 0.02504°E

Information
- Type: Preparatory School
- Motto: Let Each Flame Burn Brighter
- Established: 1932
- Local authority: London Borough of Redbridge
- Department for Education URN: 102866 Tables
- Head of School: Jenny Maslen
- Gender: Coeducational
- Age: 3 to 11
- Enrolment: 375
- Colour: Red
- Website: http://www.wgprep.co.uk/

Woodford Green Preparatory School is a preparatory school in Woodford Green, London. It was founded in 1932 to provide a non-denominational Christian education for boys and girls. The first headmistress was Norah Kathleen Read. The current Head is Jenny Maslen.

In September 2026 Woodford Green Preparatory school joined St Aubyn's School and Bancroft's School to form the Bancroft’s Family of Schools.

== Notable alumni ==
- Tony Robinson (b. 1946), actor who played Baldrick in the Blackadder series
- Sir Patrick Vallance (b. 1960) Minister of State for Science and former Chief Scientific Advisor
- David Cracknell (b. 1968), journalist and former political editor of the Sunday Times
- Paul Farmer (b. 1950), devised first public exam in pop music for schools
