= Snaresbrook tube station =

London Underground station

Snaresbrook
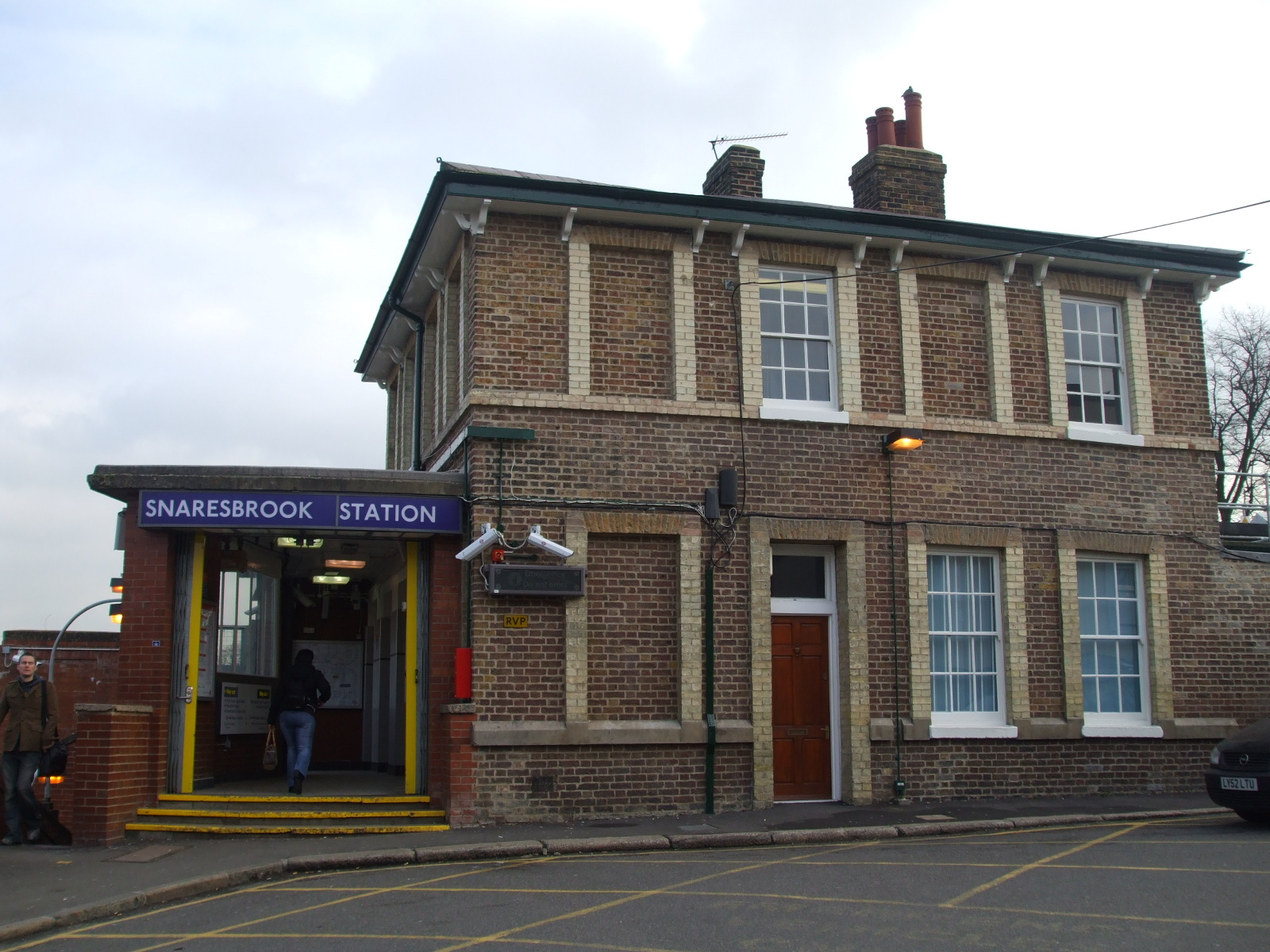
- Station building
- Interactive map of Snaresbrook

General information
- Location: Snaresbrook
- Local authority: London Borough of Redbridge
- Managed by: London Underground
- Number of platforms: 2
- Fare zone: 4

London Underground annual entry and exit
- 2021: ▼1.08 million
- 2022: ▲1.67 million
- 2023: ▲1.85 million
- 2024: ▼1.82 million
- 2025: ▲1.83 million

Railway companies
- Original company: Eastern Counties Railway
- Pre-grouping: Great Eastern Railway
- Post-grouping: London and North Eastern Railway

Key dates
- 22 August 1856: Opened as Snaresbrook
- 1857: Renamed Snaresbrook for Wanstead
- November 1898: Renamed Snaresbrook and Wanstead
- 1929: Renamed Snaresbrook for Wanstead
- 14 December 1947: Central line service introduced; renamed Snaresbrook
- 1949: Goods yard closed
- 1970: Final British Rail service

Other information
- External links: TfL station info page
- Coordinates: 51.58083°N 0.02166°E

Snaresbrook is a London Underground station in the area of Snaresbrook in east London. It is on the Central line, between Leytonstone and South Woodford stations. It is in London fare zone 4.

== History ==
The station was opened by the Eastern Counties Railway on 22 August 1856 as part of their branch to Loughton which opened that day. Originally named Snaresbrook, the station was renamed several times: Snaresbrook for Wanstead in 1857; Snaresbrook and Wanstead in November 1898; Snaresbrook for Wanstead in 1929; and Snaresbrook on 14 December 1947. The station formed part of the Great Eastern Railway's system until that company amalgamated with other railways to create the London & North Eastern Railway (LNER) in 1923. The station was subsequently transferred to form part of London Underground's Central line from 14 December 1947. This formed a part of the long planned, and delayed, Eastern Extension of the Central line that was part of the London Passenger Transport Board's "New Works Programme" of 1935–1940.

The station was partially reconstructed in 1893, the most notable feature being the provision of a bay platform that remained in use until transfer to the Underground.

The station is a fine survivor of a Victorian suburban station, with later additions, and includes a brick built station building as well as extensive cast iron and timber canopies to the platforms. A small secondary ticket office, serving the westbound platforms, was constructed in c.1948 but this is now unused. Also of note, dating from the same date, are the examples of the concrete roundels (some combined with lamp posts) found on the platforms.

In 2018, it was announced that the station would gain step-free access by 2023–24, as part of a £200m investment to increase the number of accessible stations on the Tube.

== The station today ==
In addition to the main building, an alternative exit open at morning peak hours is available directly on the south side of Wanstead High Street, with another open all day on the north side of the same road accessible via footbridge running parallel to the railway.

== Connections ==
London Buses route W14 serves the station.

Preceding station	London Underground	Following station
Leytonstone towards Ealing Broadway or West Ruislip	Central line	South Woodford towards Epping
Historical railways
Leytonstone; Line and station open	Great Eastern Railway; Eastern Counties Railway; Loughton branch	George Lane; Line and station open
