= Leyton tube station =

London Underground station

Leyton
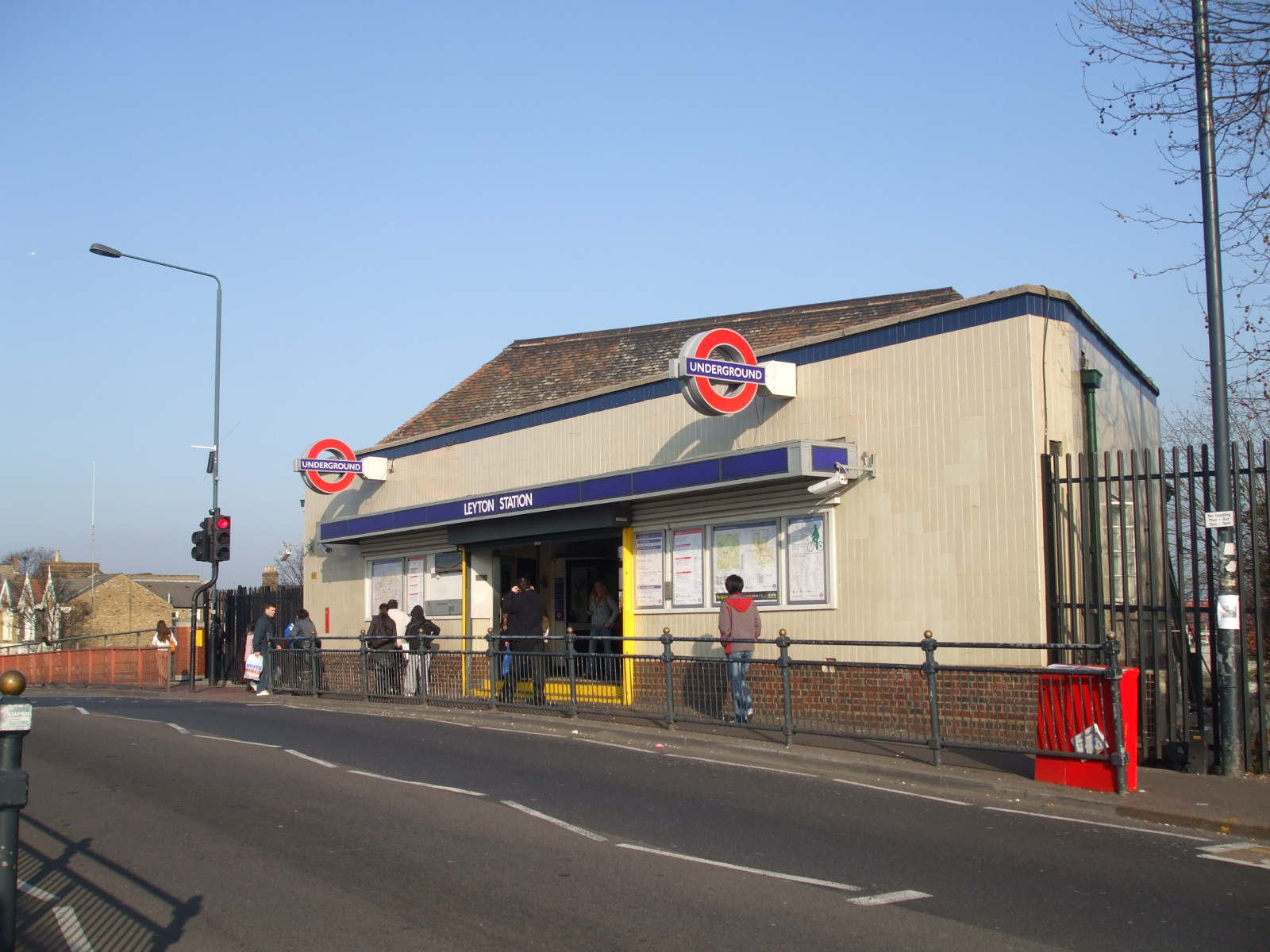
- Entrance on Leyton High Road (A112)
- Interactive map of Leyton

General information
- Location: Leyton
- Local authority: London Borough of Waltham Forest
- Managed by: London Underground
- Owner: Transport for London
- Number of platforms: 2
- Fare zone: 3

London Underground annual entry and exit
- 2021: ▼5.29 million
- 2022: ▲8.36 million
- 2023: ▲8.59 million
- 2024: ▼8.58 million
- 2025: ▼8.40 million

Railway companies
- Original company: Eastern Counties Railway
- Pre-grouping: Great Eastern Railway
- Post-grouping: London and North Eastern Railway

Key dates
- 22 August 1856: Opened as Low Leyton
- 27 November 1867: Renamed Leyton
- 5 May 1947: Central line service introduced
- 6 May 1968: Goods yard closed

Other information
- External links: TfL station info page
- Coordinates: 51.5566°N 0.0052°W

Leyton (/ˈleɪtən/) is a London Underground station in Leyton, in the London Borough of Waltham Forest, east London. It is located on Leyton High Road, adjacent to the A12. The station is on the Central line, between Stratford and Leytonstone stations. It is in London fare zone 3.

== History ==
The railway line from Loughton Branch Junction (on the Lea Valley line between Stratford and Lea Bridge) to Loughton was built by the Eastern Counties Railway, and opened on 22 August 1856. A station at Leyton was opened on the same day, and was originally named Low Leyton. It was renamed Leyton on 27 November 1867 by the Great Eastern Railway.

When the Central line (then known as the Central London Railway) was amalgamated under the management of London Passenger Transport Board in 1933, plans for major expansions to the line were developed. (Note: This was known as The 1935–40 New Works Programme.) The station was first served by the Central line on 5 May 1947, as part of the extension of the line to Leytonstone.

== Design ==
The current station buildings largely date from the reconstruction of 1879, which saw the original level crossing replaced by a bridge, although some alterations were carried out in connection with the transfer of the station from the London & North Eastern Railway to London Underground as part of the eastern extensions of the Central line.

In the 1990s, the northern ticket office and entrance – dating from 1901 – were removed as part of the controversial M11 extension (now the A12) that was built adjacent to the station. In the mid-2000s, the station was comprehensively refurbished as part of the London Underground PPP.

=== Planned upgrade and step free access ===
According to Transport for London (TfL), the station is severely overcrowded at peak periods, due to the small ticket hall (as a result of the station's location on top of the bridge over the tracks), and the proximity of the ticket barriers to the narrow pavement outside the station. TfL noted that during the morning peak, queues to enter the station prevent pedestrians from walking past, and in the evening peak an emergency exit is used to alleviate overcrowding.

In 2011, it was announced the capacity of the station would be increased, in order to cope with the predicted additional users of the station during the 2012 Olympic Games, and to ease congestion. This work would have created a new access to Goodall Road from the westbound platform. This work did not take place.

In 2019, it was announced that Waltham Forest and TfL planned an expansion and upgrade of the station, including step free access. This work will involve construction of a new, larger ticket hall north of the current one, a new footbridge, wider stairs and step free access to both platforms. The existing ticket hall building would then be repurposed as a retail unit by TfL Property. In 2020, a funding agreement between Waltham Forest and TfL was signed, with Waltham Forest contributing £9 million towards the project. In 2023, it was announced that TfL had been successful in a bid for HM Government Levelling Up funding, with funding of £13.7 million agreed in January 2024. Construction work began in February 2025, and is expected to be completed by Spring 2027.

== Location ==
Leyton Mills Retail Park, Leyton Library, New Spitalfields Market, Leyton Orient F.C. stadium, and St. Patrick's Catholic Cemetery are within proximity of the station. Around Leyton station, the line runs parallel to the A12 road, while the station entrance is connected by the A112. It serves the area of the name itself, situated to the north of the A12 in the London Borough of Waltham Forest. Leyton is largely residential, with houses built from 1870 to 1910. The origin of its name was derived from its geographical location, being at the "tun" of the river Lea, and the ancient parish was named Low Leyton. (Note: The prefix was subsequently dropped in 1921.) To the south, it covers the Cathall housing estate in Leytonstone.

London Buses routes 58, 69, 97 and 158 serve the station.

== Services ==
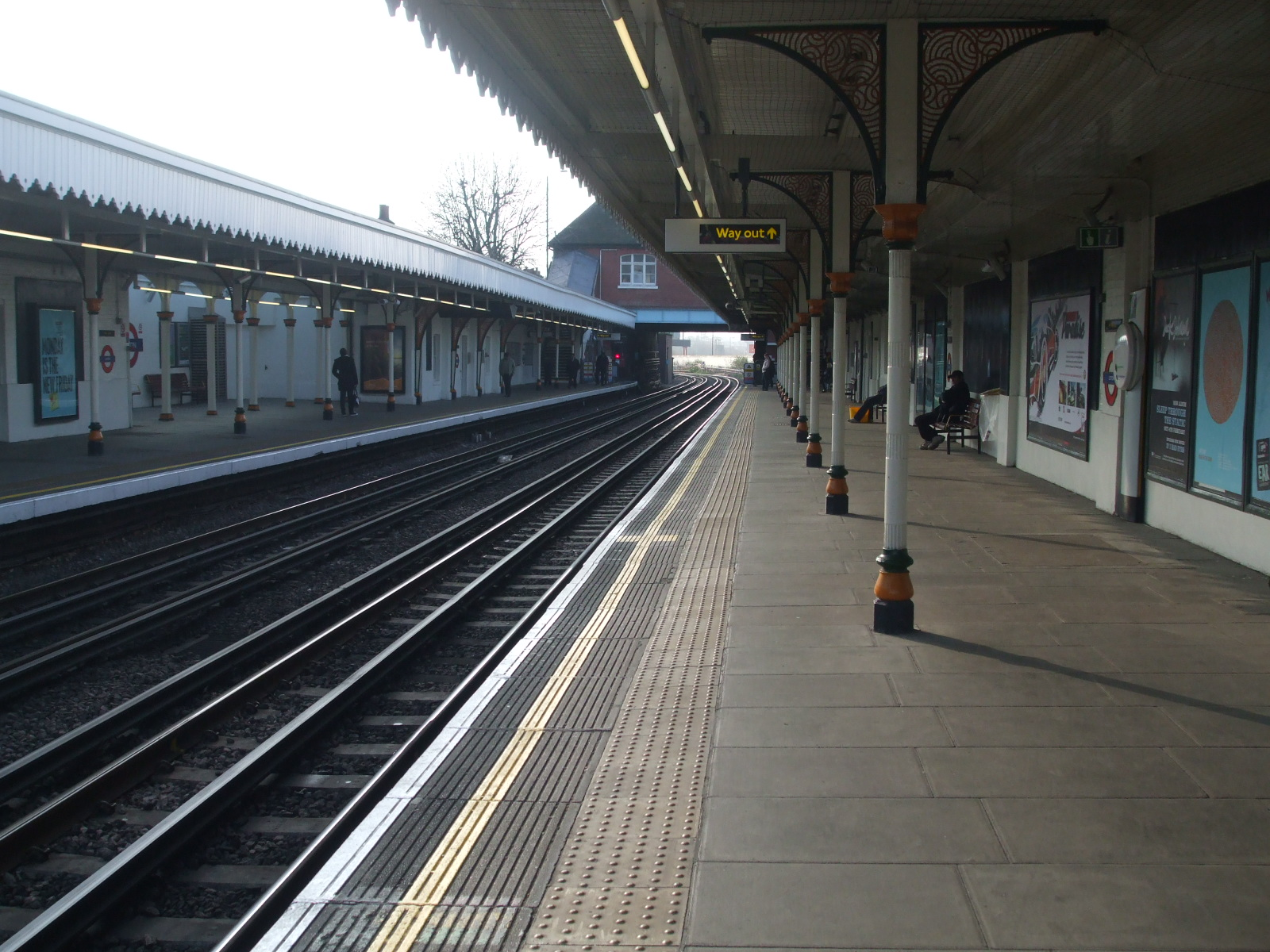
Eastbound platform looking west, with the curve towards the tunnel portal in the background

Leyton station is on the Central line in London fare zone 3. It is between Stratford to the west and Leytonstone to the east. The station sits between two adjacent stations assigned to two zones. Trains generally operate between West Ruislip and Epping, and between Ealing Broadway and Hainault.

The typical off-peak services, in trains per hour (tph) is:

- 9 tph eastbound to Epping
- 3 tph eastbound to Loughton
- 9 tph eastbound to Hainault (via Newbury Park)
- 3 tph eastbound to Newbury Park
- 9 tph westbound to West Ruislip
- 3 tph westbound to Northolt
  - 9 tph westbound to Ealing Broadway
  - 3 tph westbound to White City

Night Tube services also operate at this station. Trains run every 10 minutes to Hainault via Newbury Park or Loughton eastbound, and to Ealing Broadway or White City westbound.

== Notes ==
Preceding station	London Underground	Following station
Stratford towards Ealing Broadway or West Ruislip	Central line	Leytonstone towards Epping, Hainault or Woodford via Newbury Park
Historical railways
Stratford; Line closed, station open	Great Eastern Railway; Eastern Counties Railway; Loughton branch	Leytonstone; Line and station open
