= St Aubyn's School =

Location
- Bunces Lane; Woodford Green, IG8 9DU; England; 51.603°N 0.0167°E

Information
- Type: Independent Preparatory
- Motto: Fortiter Fideliter Feliciter ("Bravely, Faithfully, Happily")
- Established: 1884
- Founder: James Crump
- Local authority: Redbridge
- Head: Louis Taylor
- Staff: 100 (full time and part time)
- Gender: Mixed
- Age: 3 to 11
- Enrollment: 500
- Houses: York, Hayton, School and Grove
- Colours: Blue, Yellow, Red and Green
- Website: www.staubyns.com

St Aubyn's School is a co-educational, private, preparatory school in Woodford Green, England, with around 500 pupils aged between 3 and 11.

== History ==
The school was set up by James Crump. It began in 1884 as a boys' day and boarding preparatory school opposite Bancroft's School in Woodford Wells, moving to Broomhill Walk in 1893.

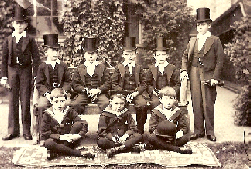
St Aubyn's boys, 1890s

Since 1923 the school has been on Bunces Lane, where its main building was once a house called Pyrmont Villa, which later extended into the adjoining parklands. During the Second World War, the school was taken over by the army and the field was used as an army parade ground, during which time the school decamped to Cumberland. The school became a charitable trust in 1975, and became co-educational in 1995.

In September 2026 St Aubyn's school joined Bancroft's School and Woodford Green Preparatory School to form the Bancroft’s Family of Schools.

== Performing arts ==
The school has been awarded the Artsmark Silver award by the Arts Council.

== Cadet Corps ==
St Aubyn's has a cadet corps. They parade once a week, have an annual camp, and meet at weekends.
