= Woodford (constituency) =

Parliamentary constituency in the United Kingdom, 1945–1964

- Former borough constituency for the House of Commons
- County: Essex

1945–1964
- Seats: One
- Created from: Epping
- Replaced by: Wanstead & Woodford

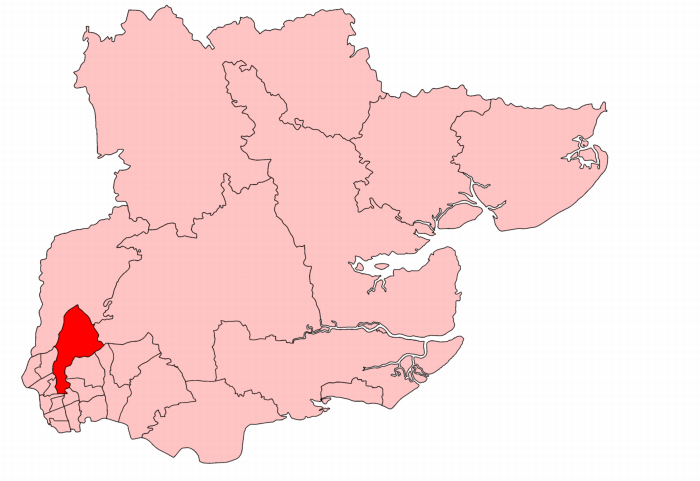
Woodford in Essex, 1945–1950

Woodford was a parliamentary constituency in Essex which returned one member of parliament (MP) to the House of Commons of the Parliament of the United Kingdom from 1945 until it was renamed for the 1964 general election.

The constituency's only member of parliament for its entire existence was Sir Winston Churchill of the Conservative Party; from 1924 he had represented the Epping constituency from which Woodford was created. He represented the Woodford seat during his second tenure as prime minister, and continued to hold it until he retired aged 89 at the 1964 general election; it was the last seat he represented in a parliamentary career that spanned over 60 years. He was the Father of the House for the last five years of his tenure in the seat. A statue of Churchill was unveiled on Woodford Green in the constituency in 1959.

== Boundaries ==
1945–1955: The Borough of Wanstead and Woodford, and the Urban District of Chigwell.

1955–1964: The Borough of Wanstead and Woodford.

The constituency's boundaries were subject to a radical change in 1955, when the new Chigwell constituency was created, removing the less urbanised parts of the seat. The new Wanstead and Woodford constituency was subject to minor boundary changes reflecting alterations to the Municipal Borough of Wanstead and Woodford since the last general redistribution of parliamentary seats in 1955. The pre and post 1964 seats comprised the whole municipal borough, within its 1955 and 1964 boundaries respectively.

== Members of Parliament ==
Election	Member	Party
1945	Rt Hon Sir Winston Churchill	Conservative
1964	constituency abolished: see Wanstead and Woodford	

== Election results ==
General election 1945: Woodford
Party	Candidate	Votes	%	±%
Conservative	Winston Churchill (Note: technically stood as "Conservative and National". See Toye 2015, p213)	27,688	72.53	
Independent	Alexander Hancock	10,488	27.47	
Majority		17,200	45.06	
Turnout		38,176	65.53	
Conservative win (new seat)				

General election 1950: Woodford
Party	Candidate	Votes	%	±%
Conservative	Winston Churchill	37,239	59.61	−12.92
Labour	Seymour Hills	18,740	30.00	New
Liberal	Howard Vivien Davies	5,664	9.07	New
Communist	Bill Brooks	827	1.32	New
Majority		18,499	29.61	−15.45
Turnout		62,470	86.06	+20.53
Conservative hold		Swing		

General election 1951: Woodford
Party	Candidate	Votes	%	±%
Conservative	Winston Churchill	40,938	62.96	+3.35
Labour	William Aaron Archer	22,359	34.39	+4.39
Communist	John Ross Campbell	871	1.34	+0.02
Independent	Alexander Hancock	851	1.31	New
Majority		18,579	28.57	−1.04
Turnout		65,019	83.38	−2.68
Conservative hold		Swing		

General election 1955: Woodford
Party	Candidate	Votes	%	±%
Conservative	Winston Churchill	25,069	73.02	
Labour	Arnold Keith Morgan Milner	9,261	26.98	
Majority		15,808	46.04	
Turnout		34,330	75.96	
Conservative hold		Swing		

General election 1959: Woodford
Party	Candidate	Votes	%	±%
Conservative	Winston Churchill	24,815	71.24	−1.78
Labour	Arthur Latham	10,018	28.76	+1.78
Majority		14,797	42.48	−3.57
Turnout		34,833	77.29	+1.33
Conservative hold		Swing		

== Notes ==
Parliament of the United Kingdom
Preceded by Epping	UK Parliament constituency Representative for Loughton, Buckhurst Hill, Chigwell; 1950–1955	Succeeded by Chigwell
Preceded by Epping	UK Parliament constituency Representative for Wanstead, Woodford; 1945–1964	Succeeded by Wanstead and Woodford
Preceded by Epping	Constituency represented by the prime minister 5–26 July 1945	Succeeded by Limehouse
Preceded by Limehouse	Constituency represented by the leader of the opposition 1945–1951	Succeeded by Walthamstow West
Preceded by Walthamstow West	Constituency represented by the prime minister 1951–1955	Succeeded by Warwick and Leamington
Preceded by Gower	Constituency represented by the father of the House; 1959–1964	Succeeded by Saffron Walden
