= St Barnabas' Church, Woodford Green =

Church of England church

Coordinates: 51.6075°N 0.0385°E

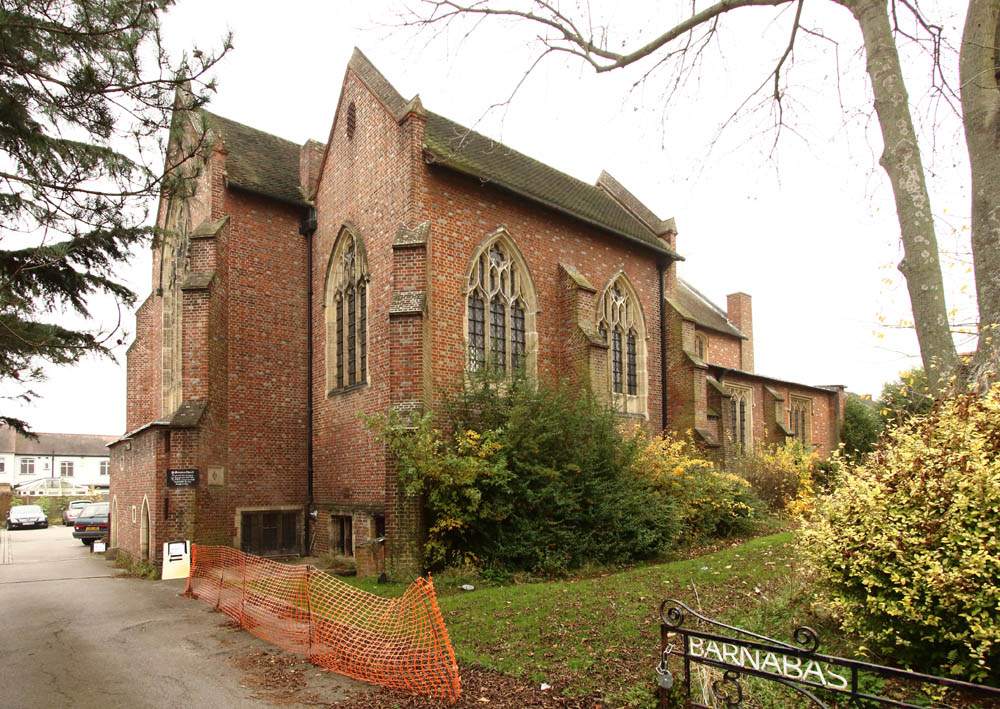
St Barnabas' Church

St Barnabas' Church, Woodford Green, is a Church of England church in Snakes Lane East, Woodford, London. It had its origins in a 1904 iron mission church – this was attached to St Paul's Church, Woodford. A permanent church was built between 1910 and 1911, with a lady chapel, organ chamber, chancel and two bays of an aisled nave – the nave was completed in 1964. The church was designed by E T Dunn, who also designed St Luke's Church, Ilford, and produced a proposed design for a new chapel screen at St Peter's Church, Bethnal Green. Parts of the parishes of St Paul's, All Saints Church, Woodford Wells, and Holy Trinity Church, South Woodford, were combined to form the new parish of St Barnabas in 1911.
