= Woodford, London =

Area of Greater London, England

Coordinates: 51.60475°N 0.02979°E

Woodford
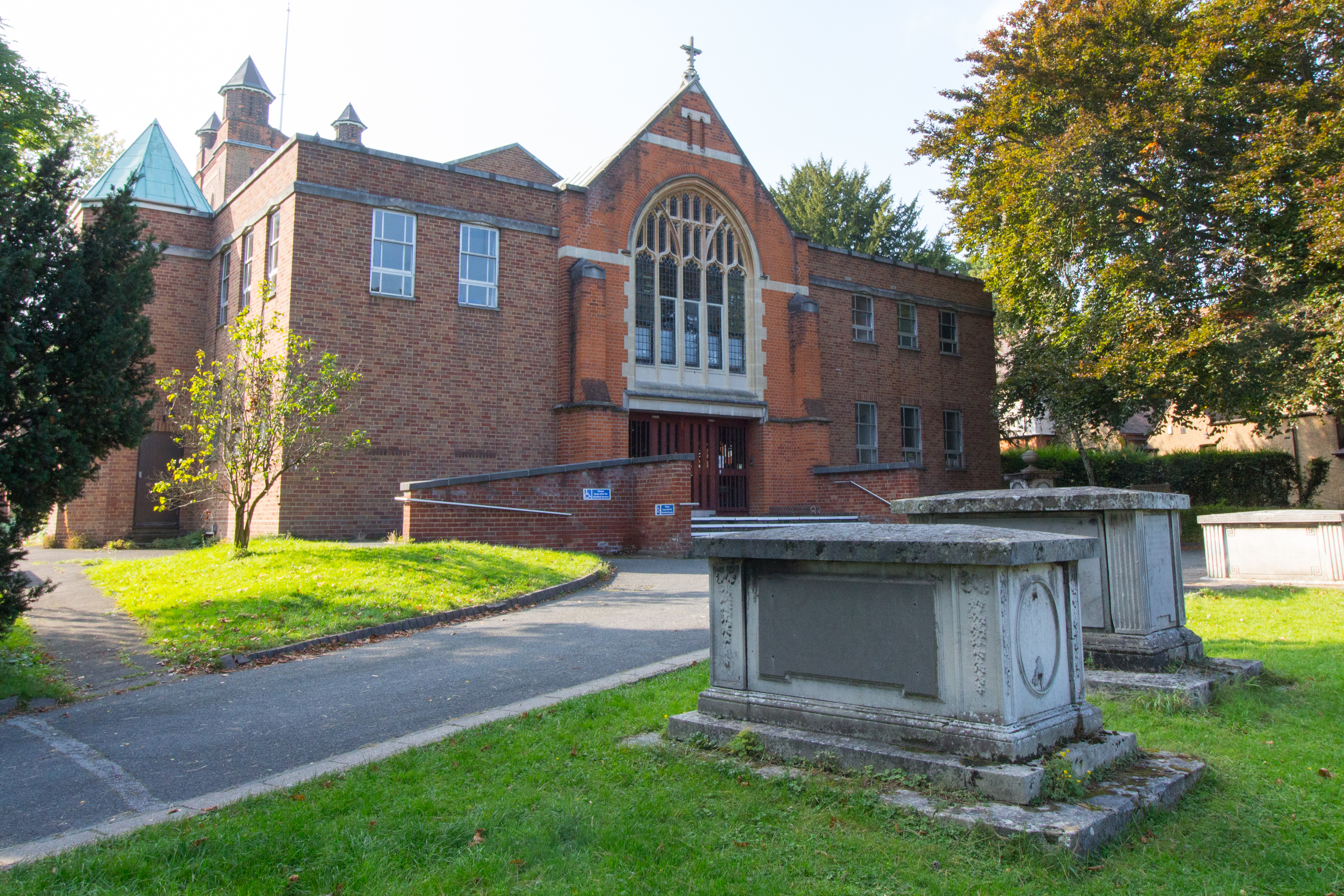
- St Mary's Church, the parish church of Woodford

- Location within Greater London
- OS grid reference: TQ405915
  - Charing Cross: 9.5 mi (15.3 km) SW
- London borough: Redbridge
- Ceremonial county: Greater London
- Region: London
- Country: England
- Sovereign state: United Kingdom
- Post town: WOODFORD GREEN
- Postcode district: IG8
- Post town: London
- Postcode district: E18
- Dialling code: 020
- Police: Metropolitan
- Fire: London
- Ambulance: London
- UK Parliament: Chingford and Woodford Green
- London Assembly: Havering and Redbridge

Woodford is a town in East London, England, within the London Borough of Redbridge. It is located 9.5 miles (15.3 km) north-east of Charing Cross. Woodford historically formed an ancient parish in the county of Essex. It contained a string of agrarian villages and much of it was, and is, part of Epping Forest.

From about 1700 onwards, it became a place of residence for affluent people who had business in London; this wealth, together with its elevated position, has led to it being called the "Geographical and social high point of East London". Woodford was suburban to London and after being combined with Wanstead in 1934 it was incorporated as a municipal borough in 1937. It has formed part of Greater London since 1965 and comprises the neighbourhoods of Woodford Green, Woodford Bridge, Woodford Wells and South Woodford. The area is served by two stations on the Central line of the London Underground: Woodford and South Woodford.

== History ==
Woodford (parish) population
1881	7,154
1891	10,984
1901	13,798
1911	18,496
1921	21,236
1931	23,946
1941	war #
1951	37,702
# no census was held due to war
source: UK census

=== Toponymy ===
Woodford appears in the 1086 Domesday Book as Wdefort, although its earliest recorded use is earlier in 1062 as Wudeford. The name is Old English and means 'ford in or by the wood'. The ford refers to where a minor Roman road from London crossed the River Roding, which was replaced with a bridge by 1238; this led to the renaming of part of the district as Woodford Bridge by 1805. The old Saxon road, that followed the valley at this point and utilised this ford, skirted the forest (which was, and is, on the high ground west of the Roding). The Saxon road eventually reached north of the Forest and branched east and west at that point. Woodford by this chance was on the trade route to the further parts of Essex.

Part of the district, in a similar fashion, gained the contemporary name of Woodford Green by 1883. An earlier name which has acted as an alternative to this was Woodford Row.

=== Economic development ===
The beginnings of Woodford can be traced to a medieval settlement which developed around the ford. Woodford was never a single village, rather it was a collection of hamlets, and has retained to some extent its portmanteau nature. The parish was controlled from Saxon times up to the 16th century by the Abbot of Waltham and the first known reference to a church in Woodford dates from the 12th century. After the dissolution of Waltham Abbey in 1540, the monastic lands passed to laymen. London has been central to Woodford's development. The easy access to Epping Forest, a large forest near London where members of the royal family traditionally hunted has made it attractive to Londoners since the 15th century, when wealthy Londoners started to build mansions there. Woodford provided attractive estates for London merchants and retired East India Company officials who built large houses there. As a consequence, many of the recorded inhabitants would have been servants, and there is even evidence of Africans ('negroes') living in Woodford in the eighteenth century. In fact the domestic servants and wealthy Londoners may have quickly outnumbered the remnant of the local, original rural folk.

An example of the kind of grand house typical of pre-19th century Woodford is Hurst House, also known as 'The Naked Beauty', which stands on Salway Hill, now part of Woodford High Road. Its central block was completed in the early 18th century, and its side wings were added later on in the same century. It was restored in the 1930s, only to be damaged by fire a few years later. The central block was again completely restored, with the minor wings you can still see added on.

Historians have pointed out Woodford's historic roads as evidence of its 'residential nature', as these roads provided reasonably easy access to Woodford, but no further on. There were two roads to Woodford, the 'lower road' (now Chigwell Road) and the 'upper road' (now Woodford New Road). The 'lower road' was often beset by flooding from the Roding, as it still is today, and was continually considered to be in need of repair. In fact one of the illustrious persons to be inconvenienced by the road was King James I. The 'upper road', being less used than the 'lower road' was probably in a worse condition, and the Middlesex and Essex Turnpike Trust undertook its repair and overhaul in 1721, and extended it to Whitechapel. The Trust did such a fine job it was given responsibility for the 'lower road' as well. In 1828, the Trust built the 'Woodford New Road' from Walthamstow to Woodford Wells, and was soon after connected to the newly built Epping New Road.

=== Local government ===
The parish was controlled from Saxon times up to the 16th century by the Abbot of Waltham and the first known reference to a church in Woodford dates from the 12th century. The ancient parish of Woodford, also known as Woodford St Mary after its parish church of St Mary's, formed part of the Becontree hundred of Essex. It was suburban to London and formed part of the Metropolitan Police District from 1840. For administration of the Poor Law it was grouped into the West Ham Union in 1835. In 1873 the parish was made a local government district, administered by an elected local board of nine members. Such districts were reconstituted as urban districts under the Local Government Act 1894. Woodford Urban District Council was based at offices on Snakes Lane at Woodford Green, on the site now occupied by Woodford Fire Station.

In 1934, the urban district was merged with Wanstead to form the Wanstead and Woodford Urban District. Woodford continued to form a civil parish within the enlarged urban district, but it was ineligible to have a parish council, being classed as an urban parish. The population of the Woodford parish was 2,774 in 1851, and had grown substantially to 37,702 in 1951. The Wanstead and Woodford Urban District was incorporated as a municipal borough in 1937. The parish and the Municipal Borough of Wanstead and Woodford were abolished on 1 April 1965, when the area was merged with Ilford to become the London Borough of Redbridge in the newly-created Greater London.

=== Suburban expansion ===
The beginnings of the actual modern suburbanisation of Woodford, however, can be traced to the opening (in 1856) of the Eastern Counties Railway Line from Stratford to Loughton, on which Woodford became accessible by two stations, at Snakes Lane and George Lane. The new convenience of transportation encouraged the growth in number of the daily commuter that is typical of the Woodford resident today. Woodford soon became the residence of the well-to-do city worker, as attested by John Marius Wilson in his Imperial Gazetteer of England and Wales, written between 1870 and 1872

The increase of pop. arose from erection of houses consequent upon railway communication with London....[t]here are many fine mansions, and numerous good villas.

In fact Woodford doubled its population in the middle and later decades of the 19th century due to the arrival of the railway. A good barometer of Woodford's rapid growth in this period is the erection of three churches in the area, a Congregational, Methodist and Church of All Saints, all built in 1874.

Woodford completed its suburbanisation in the period between the two World Wars of the 20th century. Available land was hungrily built on and the grand houses of the wealthy who had been building them for more than four hundred years were pulled down to make way for the middle class housing estates, typified by the three-to-four bedroom semi-detached house with front and back gardens. In the 1930s, 1,600 houses were being built in Woodford a year on average. The Central line's extension to and past Woodford in the middle of the 20th century, utilising the existing overland train network, solidified Woodford's place in the commuter belt.

=== Military activity ===
In the First World War (1914-1918) London was troubled by Zeppelin Raids. A response to this was to place two Royal Flying Corps night-fighter squadrons, 39 and 37 squadrons, with headquarters at Woodham Mortimer and Woodford Green respectively, with up to eight aircraft at each airfield (generally Bleriot Experimental BE2c). They formed part of the London Air Defence Area. 39 squadron shot down the Cuffley airship SL11 in September 1916, and was possibly the more successful in the task, but 37 squadron destroyed the airship L48 over Norfolk in June 1917.

=== Rural persistence ===
Woodford, as part of Epping Forest was one of the last places in London where medieval Commoner's rights persisted - with local farmers being allowed to graze their cattle on the common land. These rights were protected by sections 14 and 15 of the Byelaws passed by the Conservators of Epping Forest. Even late into the 20th century cattle were allowed to roam freely on the forest ground (Forest, in this instance being the term applying to the district rather than that area with trees).

The practice became increasingly less well suited to the times, as they occasionally penetrated into neighbouring gardens and roads before being driven back onto the forest land.

The local BSE outbreak during the early 1990s caused the practice to be halted for a while. Their departure, however, meant that grass and saplings grew on the previously well-cropped meadow areas of forest land. When the cattle were reintroduced in 2001 their range was restricted so that there would be less conflict with other interests.

== Politics ==
Woodford is divided between three parliamentary constituencies including Chingford and Woodford Green which is currently represented by Conservative Iain Duncan Smith, who was the Party Leader from 2001 to 2003. Chingford and Woodford Green is separated from Ilford North by the Central line, whilst a small part of South Woodford is in Leyton and Wanstead constituency. Previously the local constituency was Wanstead and Woodford (1974–1997) and before that Woodford (1945–1974) which was represented by Winston Churchill between 1945 and 1964. Churchill had previously represented the area (1924-1945) as part of the Epping Parliamentary Constituency - and was therefore Woodford's local MP, both when he was the wartime Prime Minister - and also later, when he served as a peacetime Prime Minister. Churchill is commemorated by a statue on the green at Woodford.

== Notable people ==
Woodford has connections with major cultural figures. The first is the celebrated writer, artist, craftsman William Morris, founder of the Arts and Crafts Movement, a nineteenth-century revivalist movement dedicated to restoring England's artisan traditions. As a child he lived at Woodford Hall between 1840 and 1847. Woodford Hall (demolished at the start of the 20th century) stood on Woodford High Road on the site where the Woodford Parish Memorial Hall now is. Another writer who lived in Woodford is James Hilton, who wrote the novels Goodbye Mr Chips and Lost Horizon (in which he coined the term Shangri La) in a semi-detached house at 42 Oak Hill Gardens, which was, however, in Walthamstow borough. A blue plaque commemorates his residence at the house.

The Clergyman Sydney Smith was born in Woodford in 1771. Smith became a vicar and prominent Reformer, but he is now most famous as a great wit of the early nineteenth century. He was a part of the brilliant intellectual circles of his day, and once said of the historian Macaulay, [He] has occasional flashes of silence, that make his conversation perfectly delightful. On his position as a Clergyman in Yorkshire, he remarked My living in Yorkshire was so far out of the way, that it was actually twelve miles from a lemon. He compared marriage to a pair of shears, so joined that they can not be separated; often moving in opposite directions, yet always punishing anyone who comes between them. Moreover, Smith published several recipes; his rhyming recipe for salad dressing (Let onion atoms lurk within the bowl/And, scarce suspected, animate the whole) being one of his most infamous examples.

Woodford also has connections with the leading Suffragette, peace campaigner and anti-fascist Sylvia Pankhurst. Pankhurst was a longtime resident on Charteris Road, close to Woodford Station. She had been introduced to the area by George Lansbury, co-founder of the Labour Party and grandfather of Angela Lansbury. Previous to her residence in Charteris Road, Sylvia Pankhurst had challenged the moral codes of her day by living in sin with an Italian radical on 126 High Road, opposite the Horse and Well Pub. She renamed the cottage Red Cottage in homage to the leftist activities she carried out from there. She erected an anti-air-warfare monument in protest to the bombing of the people of Ethiopia under the orders of Benito Mussolini on the site of the cottage (the cottage was pulled down in the 1930s).

Richard Warner, who occupied Harts at Woodford Green, cultivated the first gardenia to flower in England and who in 1771 compiled Plantae Woodfordienses - A Catalogue Of The More Perfect Plants Growing Spontaneously About Woodford In The County Of Essex

=== Other notables ===
- Clement Attlee, former Labour Prime Minister (Woodford Green)
- Derek B, a pioneer of British hip-hop and the third-ever rapper to appear on the BBC music programme "Top Of The Pops". Grew up in Woodford.
- Nick Berry, actor born 1963
- Sanjeev Bhaskar, comedian and actor (South Woodford)
- Nugent Cachemaille-Day, architect (born in South Woodford)
- Terry Chimes, former drummer with The Clash, Black Sabbath & Hanoi Rocks
- Winston Churchill, former Prime Minister, MP for Epping Constituency (which included Woodford) 1924-1945 and, subsequently, Woodford 1945-1964
- Vince Clarke, founder member of Depeche Mode and member of Erasure and Yazoo (born in South Woodford)
- John Dankworth, English jazz composer, saxophonist, clarinettist and writer of film scores.
- J.M. Dent, publisher, founder of Everyman Library and friend/member of Joseph Hocking's congregation at Woodford Union Church (Woodford Green)
- Joe Dever, author and games designer (Woodford Bridge)
- Richard J. Evans, historian and author
- Lynn Fontanne, leading 20th century Broadway actress with Alfred Lunt.
- Charles Christian Hennell, author and Christian apologist
- James Hilton, author (Woodford Green)
- Joseph Hocking, novelist (who was Methodist minister of Woodford Union Church in Edwardian times (1901-1910) (Church became known as Woodford Green United Free Church from 1946 )
- Professor Ralph Ambrose Kekwick FRS (1908-2000) Biochemist who did pioneering work human plasma fractionation including first production of Factor VIII.
- Louisa Leaman, actor (Woodford Green)
- Russell Lissack, Bloc Party guitarist (both he and Okereke attended Trinity school in Woodford Green)
- Carli Norris, actress
- Kele Okereke, Bloc Party vocalist and guitarist (Woodford Green)
- Coventry Patmore, poet and critic (born in Woodford)
- Sylvia Pankhurst, suffragette (Woodford Green)
- Peshay, electronic music record producer and DJ (South Woodford)
- Ruth Rendell, author (South Woodford)
- Tony Robinson, actor and TV personality
- Wilfrid Percy Henry Sheldon, physician-paediatrician to Queen Elizabeth II
- George Edmund Street, a leading English architect of the Victorian Gothic Revival
- Meera Syal, comedian, writer and actress (South Woodford)
- Charles Harrison Townsend, a leading English architect - designed Woodford Union Church, which opened 28 April 1904
- Nigel Travis, the CEO of Dunkin' Donuts
- Christine Truman, Wimbledon-level tennis player (as were sister Nell, brother Humphrey, also) - resident at Woodford Green
- Kate Williams, actress, Woodford resident during the making of the TV series Love Thy Neighbour (Woodford Bridge)

== Geography ==
Nearest places

- Highams Park
- Walthamstow
- Chingford
- Barkingside
- Clayhall
- Wanstead
- Snaresbrook
- Buckhurst Hill
- Chigwell
- Loughton
- South Woodford
- Leytonstone
- Roding Valley
- Redbridge

== Transport ==
=== Public transport ===
The London Underground Central line serves Woodford, South Woodford and Roding Valley. Trains link the area to Epping, Loughton, Chigwell and Hainault to the north. Southbound services run directly to Stratford, The City, The West End and West London.

The London Overground serves nearby Highams Park station between Liverpool Street and Chingford.

London buses 20, 123, 179, 275, 549, W13 and W14 call at Woodford. Buses link the area directly to Debden, Wood Green, Ilford, Chingford, Walthamstow and Leyton.

Night bus N55 links the area to Oxford Circus via Hackney and Shoreditch overnight.

=== Road ===
The A104 runs north–south through Woodford between the North Circular Road and Epping. This once formed part of the A11 trunk road, before being renumbered in the 1980s to discourage use in favour of then new M11.

The A113 passes Woodford to the east, between Wanstead and Abridge or Chipping Ongar.

Other main routes include the A121 to Loughton, the A110 towards Chingford and Enfield, the A1009 towards Chingford Hatch, the A1199 to Wanstead, and the A503 towards Walthamstow.

These roads fall into the Low Emission Zone for the most polluting heavy diesel vehicles.

The A406 North Circular Road divides Woodford from South Woodford. The road forms the Ultra Low Emission Zone boundary for the most polluting light vehicles, which only applies in South Woodford.

The M11 motorway begins in Woodford and bypasses the town to the east en route to Harlow, Stansted Airport and Cambridge.

=== Walking and Cycling ===
Intermittent cycle lanes are provided along Wanstead New Road (A104) between Waterworks Corner (the North Circular Road) and Buckhurst Hill. North of Buckhurst Hill, the route continues to Epping. At Waterworks Corner, a shared-use underpass links Woodford to cycle routes and footpaths southbound towards Leyton.

The A1199 features cycle lanes between Woodford and Snaresbrook.

The Roding Valley Walk is a shared-use path for pedestrians and cyclists which begins in Woodford and continues to Ilford.

== See also ==
- St Thomas of Canterbury Church, Woodford Green
