= St Luke's Church, Ilford =

Church of England parish church in Ilford, London

Coordinates: 51°32′55.621″N 0°4′18.721″E

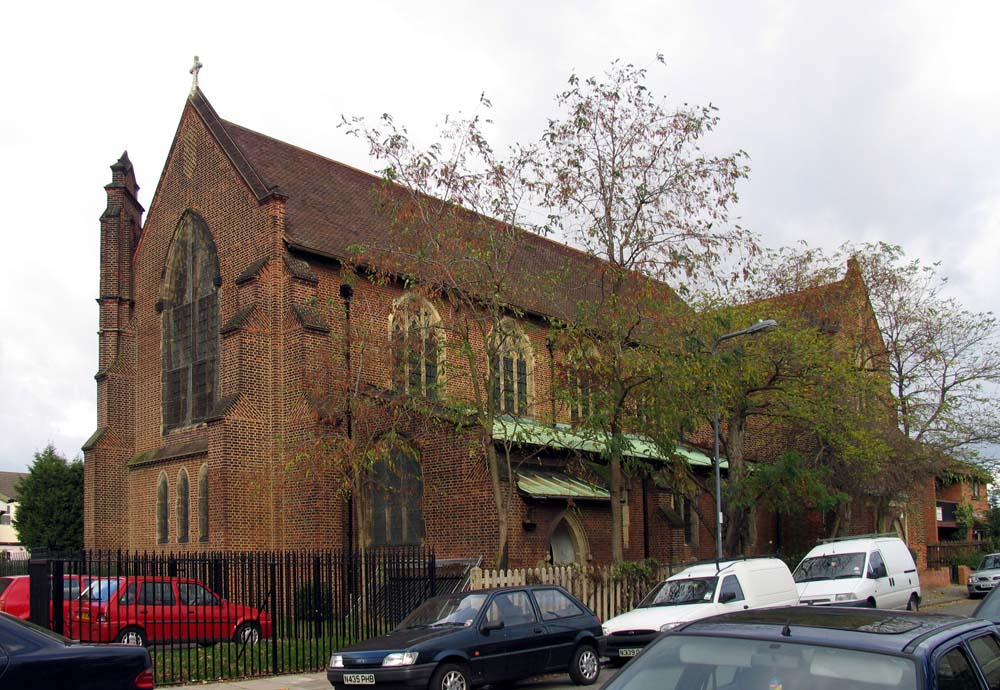
St Luke's Church, Ilford

St Luke's Church, Ilford, is a Church of England parish church in Ilford, east London. It is dedicated to Saint Luke.

It originated as a temporary mission built in the parish of St Clement's in 1909. E T Dunn designed its permanent stone and redbrick church building in a Neo-Gothic imitation of Perpendicular style - he also designed St Barnabas' Church, Woodford Wells. The permanent St Luke's was consecrated in 1915, consisting of an aisled nave and transepts - the planned chancel to complete its cruciform ground plan was never built. The church's mission district was upgraded to a parish the year after the permanent church's consecration, with the advowson vested in the Bishop of Chelmsford and the old mission church converted into the parish hall.

The church was severely damaged in 1940 during the London Blitz and its reconstruction was only completed in 1954, with the congregation worshipping in the 1909 church hall in the interim. In 1983 it was re-orientated, moving the liturgical east end to the church's geographical west end and adding meeting rooms, a kitchen, toilets and a chapel within the geographical east end. In 1998 the church was redecorated. The Marthoma Church currently worships on a Sunday.They are Malayali people originating from the South Indian state of Kerala.
