= Duchess of Newcastle =

List of wives of the Duke of Newcaslt

The Duchess of Newcastle or the Duchess of Newcastle-upon-Tyne usually refers to the wife or widow of a Duke of Newcastle. This title is sometimes used in the plural for the wives of several successive Dukes of Newcastle.

== History ==
=== 1st creation (1665) ===
The title was first conferred in 1665 upon Margaret Cavendish, Duchess of Newcastle-upon-Tyne, wife of William Cavendish, 1st Duke of Newcastle (1623–1673). She was the first Duchess of Newcastle. She was the daughter of Margaret Lucas, sister of Margaret Lucas, Countess of Bath.

=== 2nd creation (1694) ===
The second creation was on 22 February 1694, when Margaret Cavendish (née Holles), Duchess of Newcastle-upon-Tyne, became Duchess of Newcastle-upon-Tyne. She was the widow of Henry Cavendish, 2nd Duke of Newcastle and the daughter of Thomas Holles, 1st Duke of Newcastle and Catherine Poulett, 1st Duchess of Newcastle-upon-Tyne.

=== 3rd creation (1715) ===
On 24 October 1715, Harriet Godolphin (née Pelham), Duchess of Newcastle-upon-Tyne, became Duchess of Newcastle-upon-Tyne. She was the wife of Thomas Pelham-Holles, 1st Duke of Newcastle-upon-Tyne.

=== 4th creation (1719) ===
On 22 September 1719, Catherine Pelham, Duchess of Newcastle-upon-Tyne, became Duchess of Newcastle-upon-Tyne. She was the wife of Henry Pelham-Clinton, 2nd Duke of Newcastle-upon-Tyne.

=== 5th creation (1726) ===
On 12 June 1726, Anna Maria Stanhope, Duchess of Newcastle-upon-Tyne, became Duchess of Newcastle-upon-Tyne. She was the wife of Thomas Pelham Clinton. The dukedom became extinct in 1988.

== Duchesses of Newcastle-on Tyne and Newcastle ==
=== 1st creation (1665) ===
- Margaret Cavendish, Duchess of Newcastle-upon-Tyne (1623–1673) (née Margaret Lucas), English aristocrat, writer and scientist, 2nd wife of William Cavendish, 1st Duke of Newcastle
- Frances Pierrepoint (1630–1695), wife of Henry Cavendish, 2nd Duke of Newcastle

=== 2nd creation (1694) ===
- Margaret Holles, Duchess of Newcastle-upon-Tyne (1661–1716) (née Margaret Cavendish), wife of John Holles, 1st Duke of Newcastle

=== 3rd creation (1715) ===
- Harriet Pelham-Holles, Duchess of Newcastle-upon-Tyne (1701–1776) (Lady Harriet Godolphin), wife of Thomas Pelham-Holles, 1st Duke of Newcastle
- Catherine Pelham-Clinton, Countess of Lincoln (1727–1760), wife of Henry Pelham-Clinton, 2nd Duke of Newcastle
- Lady Anna Maria Stanhope, wife of Thomas Pelham-Clinton, 3rd Duke of Newcastle
- Georgiana Mundy (d.1822), wife of Henry Pelham-Clinton, 4th Duke of Newcastle
- Henrietta Hope, wife of Henry Pelham-Clinton, 6th Duke of Newcastle
- Kathleen Pelham-Clinton, Duchess of Newcastle (1872–1955) (née Kathleen Candy), conformation show judge and dog breeder, wife of Henry Pelham-Clinton, 7th Duke of Newcastle
- Olive Muriel Thompson, wife of Francis Pelham-Clinton-Hope, 8th Duke of Newcastle
- Lady Mary Montagu-Stuart-Wortley (1920–1997), 2nd wife of Henry Pelham-Clinton-Hope, 9th Duke of Newcastle
- Sally Ann Wemyss, 3rd wife of Henry Pelham-Clinton-Hope, 9th Duke of Newcastle
