= David McFall =

Scottish sculptor

David Bernard McFall RA (12 December 1919 – 18 September 1988) was a Scottish sculptor.

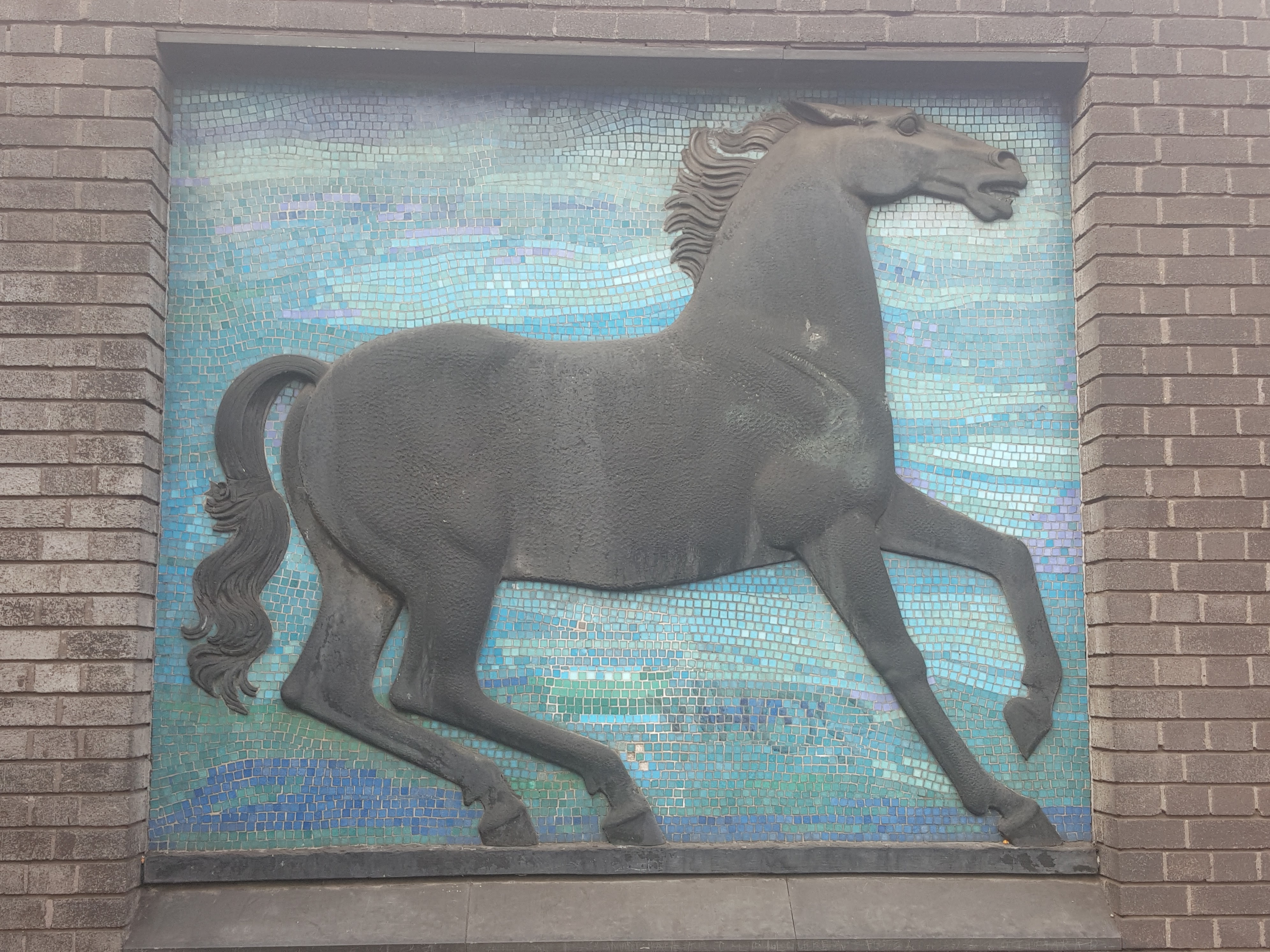
Mural by David McFall of a black horse outside Blackhorse Road station, North London.

Born in Glasgow, McFall studied at the Junior School of Arts and Crafts in Birmingham from 1931 to 1934, and at the Birmingham School of Art from 1934 to 1939. In 1939 he worked as an assistant to Eric Gill, before studying at the Royal College of Art in London from 1940 to 1941, and at the City and Guilds of London Art School from 1941 to 1945. He worked with Jacob Epstein from 1944 until 1958, returning to the City and Guilds School in Kennington to teach from 1956.

Notable works include The Bull Calf (Portland Stone), which was selected for the Royal Academy Summer Exhibition and bought for the Tate in 1942 while the sculptor was still a student; Boy and Horse (Stone), which featured in the Dome of Discovery at the Festival of Britain; the black horse mural outside Blackhorse Road station; a major statue of Winston Churchill, and a statue of Pocahontas for the publisher Cassell.

He was elected an Associate of the Royal Academy in 1955 and a full member in 1963.
