= Woodford Wells =

Coordinates: 51.615645°N 0.028861°E

- Location within Greater London
- London borough: Redbridge
- Ceremonial county: Greater London
- Region: London
- Country: England
- Sovereign state: United Kingdom
- Post town: WOODFORD GREEN
- Postcode district: IG8
- Dialling code: 020
- Police: Metropolitan
- Fire: London
- Ambulance: London
- London Assembly: Havering and Redbridge

Woodford Wells is a small settlement on the edge of Epping Forest, in Woodford, East London. The area lies about 9.5 miles (15.3 km) north-east of Charing Cross.

The name is shown in the Chapman and Andre 1777 map of Essex, and shortly after on an Ordnance Survey map of 1805; the name refers to mineral water wells. In the 18th century briefly the hamlet was a small spa but by the 1870s the wells had been long neglected and Woodford Wells had become part of a "straggle of hamlets". Among its notable features is the Horse & Well, a 17th-century coaching inn still in operation. Woodford Wells is home to Woodford Wells F.C.

== Education ==
Bancroft’s School a Secondary school, has been at Woodford Wells since the 1880s. St Aubyn's School was founded here in January 1884. In 1893, and again in 1919, it moved southwards along the High Road. It can now be found at Bunces Lane, Woodford Green.

== Religion ==
The area became a separate Anglican ecclesiastical parish in 1911 (All Saints Church, Woodford Wells ), with the completion of St Barnabas' Church taking responsibility for the area near Woodford Underground Station.
