= St Mary's Church, Woodford =

Church in Redbridge, Greater London, England

Coordinates: 51.5979°N 0.0202°E

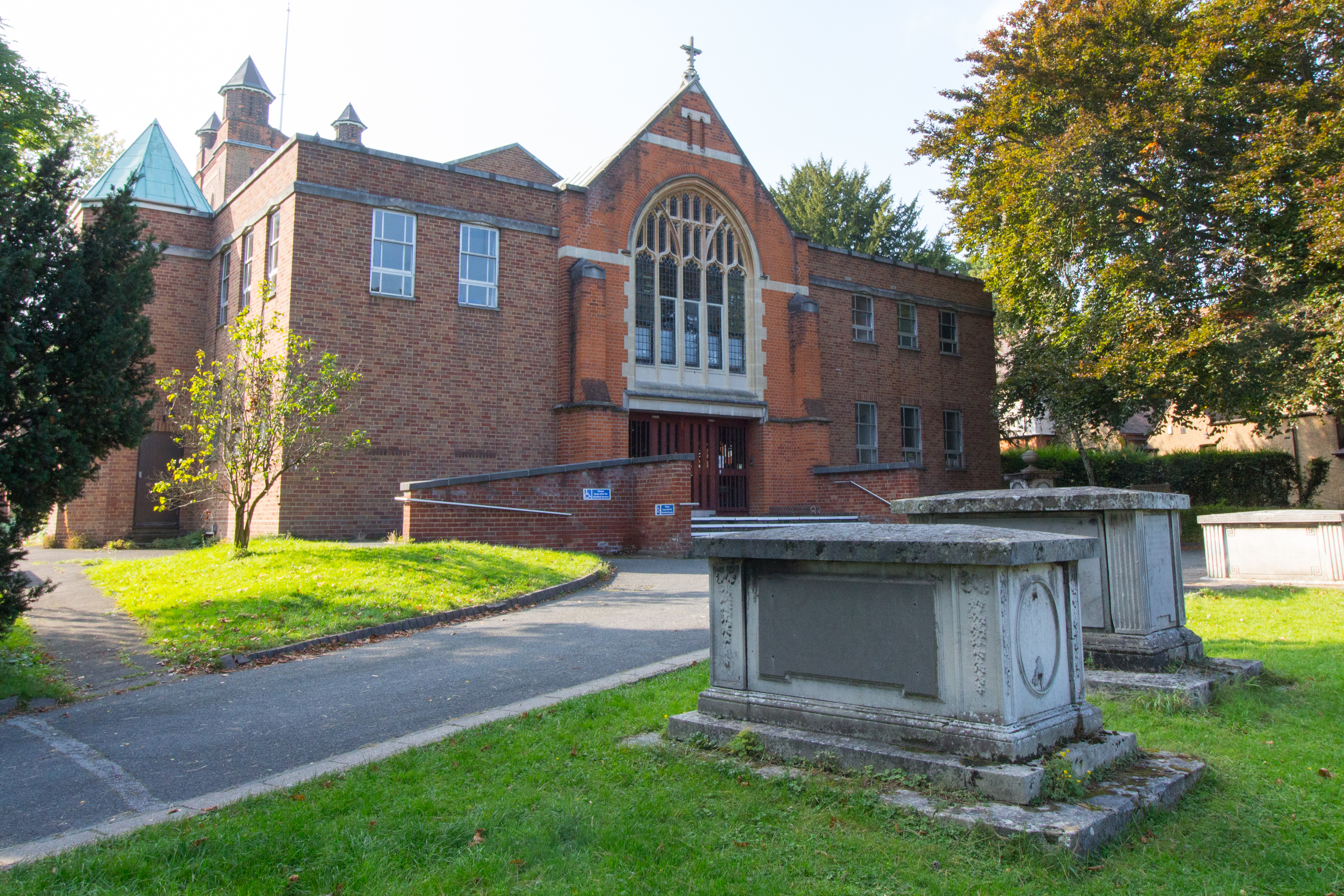
St Mary's Church, Woodford

St Mary's Church, Woodford is the ancient parish church for Woodford in the London Borough of Redbridge.

It is known to have existed by the 12th century. Its rector in the 1520s was John Larke. Its medieval west tower and spire were in dangerously poor repair by 1705 and in 1708 it was replaced with a brick tower The medieval church was substantially rebuilt in brick in the Gothic style in 1816. Population expansion led to the construction of the new churches of St Paul's in 1854 and All Saints in 1874, both within the parish.

The church was completely rebuilt in 1971-72., following an arson attack in 1969, so the interior is modern.

Before the fire, the interior contained several wall monuments and tombs, including the tomb of Bridget, widow of Alexander Staples and eldest daughter of Sir John Ernle, Chancellor of the Exchequer to Charles II and James II. The church is fitted with a 3-manual Grant, Degens and Bradbeer Organ which was built at a similar time to the organ of New College Oxford. The church was completely rebuilt in 1971-72.

The church has a ring of eight bells cast at the nearby Whitechapel Bell Foundry. The churchyard hosts one of the Great Trees of London, a Copper Beech.
