= Statue of Winston Churchill, Woodford =

Statue by David McFall in Woodford, London

Coordinates: 51.604°N 0.0192°E

Statue of Winston Churchill
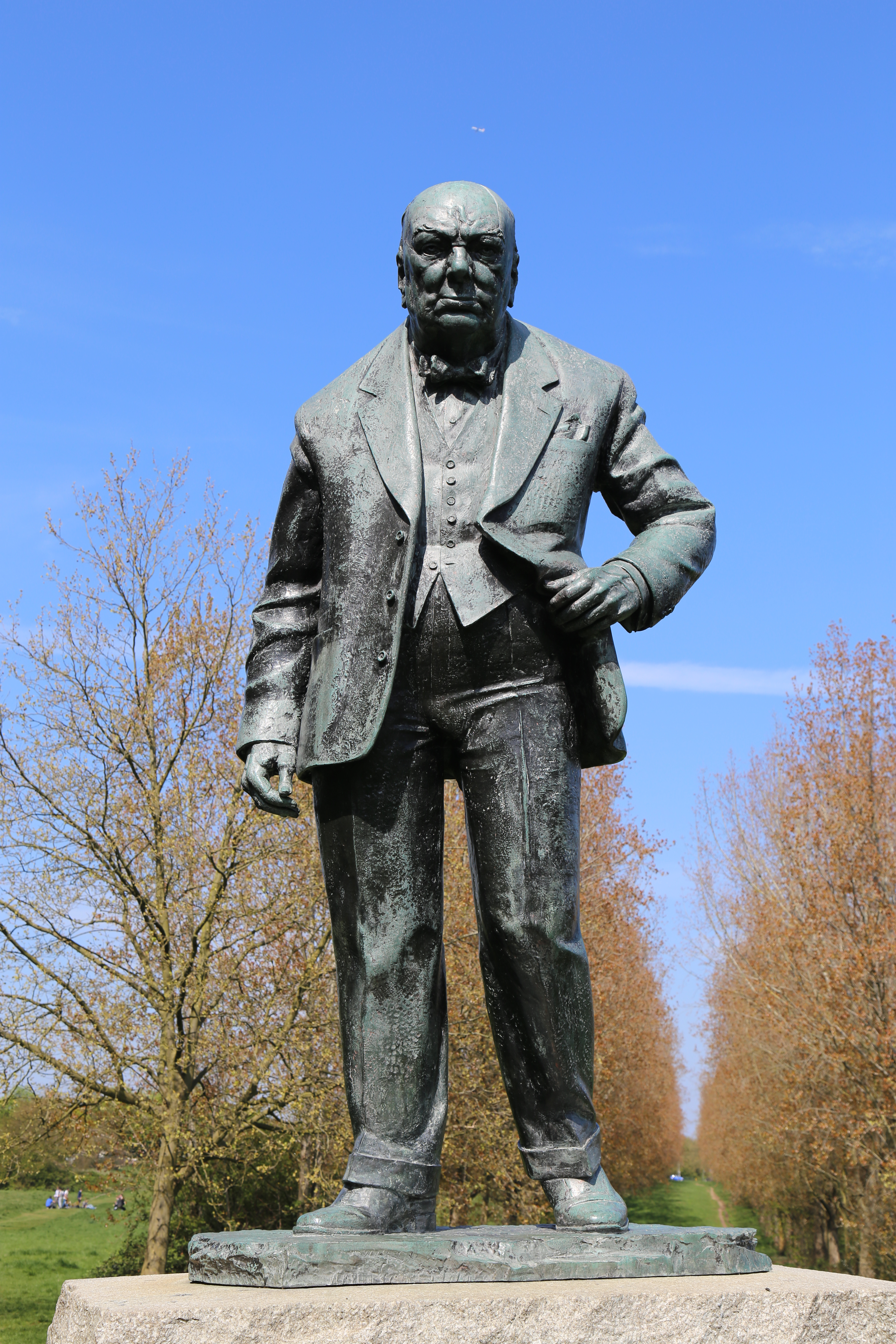
- “a sympathetic sculptural representation of Britain’s iconic war-time Prime Minister”
- Artist: David McFall
- Completion date: 1959
- Type: Statue
- Medium: Bronze
- Subject: Winston Churchill
- Dimensions: 2.7 m (9 ft)
- Location: Woodford; London; England; United Kingdom

Listed Building – Grade II
- Official name: Statue of Winston Churchill (and plinth)
- Designated: 19 January 2016
- Reference no.: 1430402

The statue of Winston Churchill in Woodford, London, is a bronze sculpture of the British statesman, created by David McFall in 1958–9. The statue commemorates Churchill's role as the member for the parliamentary constituency of Woodford. Churchill was elected to the Epping seat in 1924 and held it until 1945 when the new constituency of Woodford was created. Churchill then held this seat until his retirement in 1964. The statue is a Grade II listed structure.

== History ==
Winston Churchill's parliamentary career began at age 25, when he won the northern seat of Oldham as a Conservative candidate in the 1900 general election. It ended 64 years later in October 1964 at age 90, when he decided, at the instigation of family and friends, not to contest the 1964 general election, and ceased to be MP for Woodford. His parliamentary career was unconventional: elected a Tory in 1900, in May 1904 he crossed the floor to become a senior member of the Liberal Party. By 1924, he had left the Liberals, and in October he stood as an independent Constitutionalist, winning the seat of Epping, on the Essex/London border. Subsequently, re-joining the Tory Party, he held this seat until its abolition under parliamentary reorganisation in 1945, and then won the successor seat of Woodford, which he held until his final retirement in 1964.

In 1958, the Sir Winston Churchhill Commemoration Fund commissioned David McFall (1919–1988) to sculpt a statue of Churchill to be placed in the Woodford constituency. McFall had previously trained under Eric Gill and then collaborated with Jacob Epstein. McFall worked initially from photographs, before Churchill allowed a number of personal sittings at Chartwell, his country home in Kent. (Note: McFall also undertook a personal sitting at La Pasua, the villa in the South of France owned by Churchill’s friend Wendy Reves, when Churchill was visiting Reves in January 1958.) The sittings, after which McFall produced six busts of Churchill in addition to the Woodford statue, were the last Churchill ever permitted. The statue was unveiled by Field Marshal Bernard Montgomery, 1st Viscount Montgomery of Alamein, KG, GCB, DSO, PC, DL, on 30 October 1959. Churchill attended the ceremony and made a short speech focused on the gradual dissolution of the British Empire and on Britain's own future place in the world. (Note: Churchill's remarks included the following; "Former systems of government are being thrown aside, and new nations are rising. We wish them well. Our [own] future is one of high hope".) The statue was one of only two of Churchill completed and unveiled in his lifetime.

In the 21st century the statue has been the subject of occasional vandalism. In 2009 it was chosen as the symbol of the London Borough of Redbridge for the 2012 London Olympics.

=== Reception ===
"Presiding over your pictures at the Royal Academy is a very good bust of you in bronze by David McFall, the sculptor who did your statue for Woodford so badly at first, and deplorable photographs of which were published in all the newspapers – But now he has re-modelled the head of the statue and it is good – Monty is unveiling it on October the 3rd."

— Clementine Churchill to Churchill, 14 March 1959

Initial reactions to photographs of the work in progress were unfavourable, including those of members of Churchill's own family. Clementine Churchill, a fierce defender of her husband's reputation and public image, wrote to McFall suggesting that the face was "a caricature of Winston" and requesting changes. (Note: Lady Churchill had previously destroyed a portrait by Graham Sutherland which had been commissioned by the Houses of Parliament to celebrate Churchill's 80th birthday, but which both she and her husband intensely disliked.) McFall made alterations, and Lady Churchill adjusted her opinion (see box). The reaction at the unveiling, and subsequently, was more positive; Pathé News reported in its contemporary account that "the essence of Sir Winston is caught in the brilliant sculpture by David McFall". Churchill's own comment on the statue at the unveiling ceremony was, "very nice". Historic England describes the statue as a "highly regarded, purposeful, yet sympathetic sculptural representation of Britain's iconic war-time Prime Minister in his later years".

== Description ==
The statue is executed in bronze and is 2.74 metres (9.0 ft) high. It stands on a plinth of Cornish granite. Churchill is depicted in a three-piece suit, walking in the gardens at Chartwell. An inscription on the front of the plinth reads "WINSTON S. CHURCHILL", and another on the reverse reads "McFALL 1959". The sculpture is a Grade II listed structure.

== Sources ==
- Cherry, Bridget; O'Brien, Charles; Pevsner, Nikolaus (2005). London 5: East. Pevsner Buildings of England. New Haven, US and London: Yale University Press. ISBN 978-0-300-10701-2.
- Churchill, Randolph (1966). Youth: Winston S. Churchill 1874–1900. Authorised biography of Winston S. Churchill. Vol. I. London: Heinemann. OCLC 631249807.
- ——— (1967). Young Statesman: Winston S. Churchill 1901–1914. Authorised biography of Winston S. Churchill. Vol. II. London: Heinemann. OCLC 819765464.
- Churchill, Winston; Churchill, Clementine (1998). Soames, Mary (ed.). Speaking for Themselves: The Personal Letters of Winston and Clementine Churchill. London: Doubleday. ISBN 978-0-385-40691-8.
- Gilbert, Martin (1976). Prophet of Truth: Winston S. Churchill 1922–1939. Authorised biography of Winston S. Churchill. Vol. V. London: Heinemann. OCLC 715481469.
- ——— (1988). Never Despair: Winston S. Churchill 1945–1965. Authorised biography of Winston S. Churchill. Vol. VIII. London: Heinemann. ISBN 978-0-7737-2187-6.
