= South Woodford tube station =

London Underground station

South Woodford
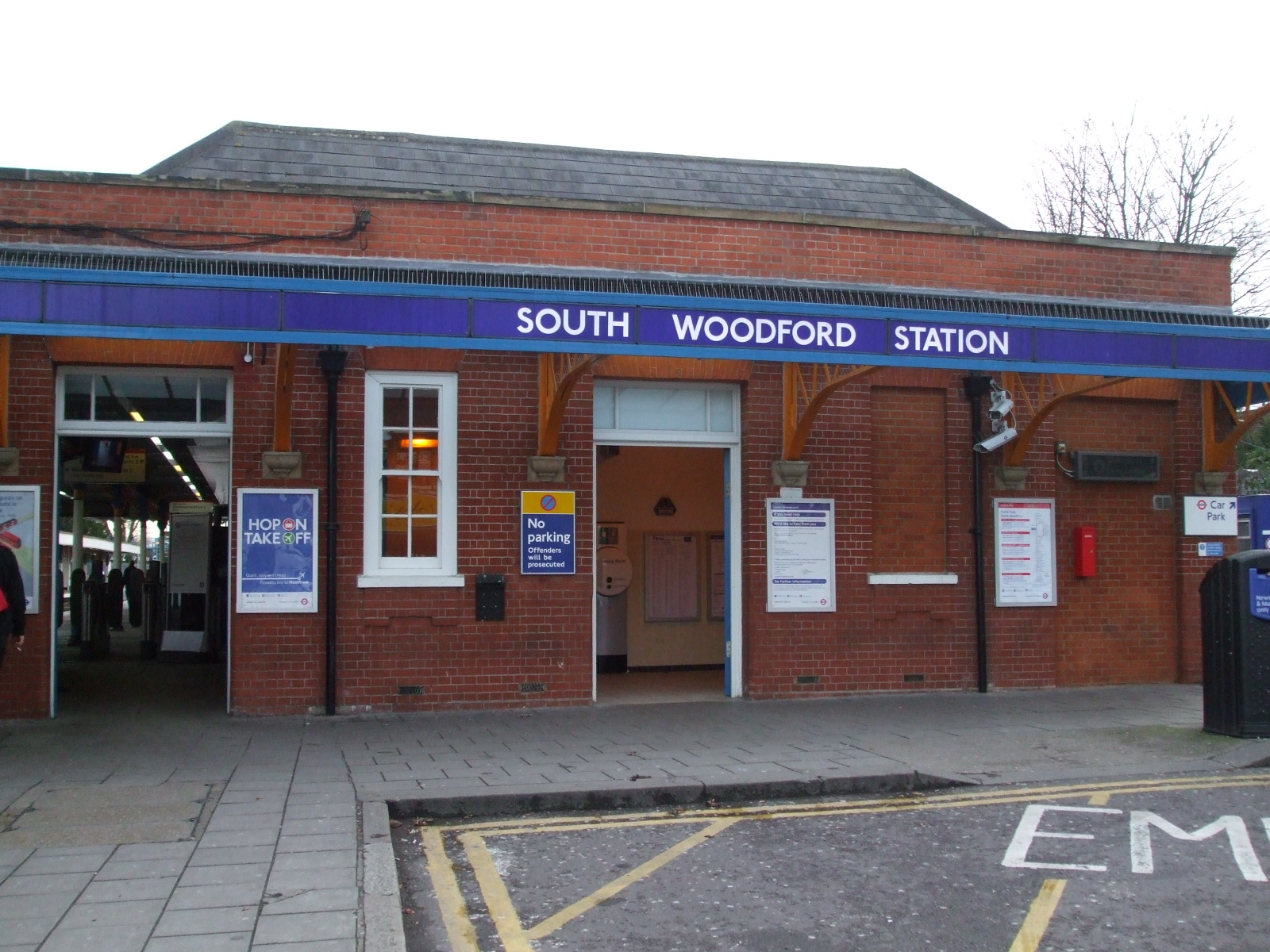
- Western entrance on George Lane
- Interactive map of South Woodford

General information
- Location: South Woodford
- Local authority: London Borough of Redbridge
- Managed by: London Underground
- Number of platforms: 2
- Accessible: Yes
- Fare zone: 4

London Underground annual entry and exit
- 2020: ▼2.31 million
- 2021: ▲2.38 million
- 2022: ▲3.79 million
- 2023: ▲4.05 million
- 2024: ▲4.15 million

Railway companies
- Original company: Eastern Counties Railway
- Pre-grouping: Great Eastern Railway
- Post-grouping: London and North Eastern Railway

Key dates
- 22 August 1856: Opened as George Lane
- 5 July 1937: Renamed South Woodford (George Lane)
- 14 December 1947: Central line service introduced; renamed South Woodford
- 1964: Goods yard closed

Other information
- External links: TfL station info page
- Coordinates: 51.5916°N 0.0275°E

South Woodford is a London Underground station in the suburb of South Woodford in east London. It is on the Central line, between Snaresbrook and Woodford stations. It is in London fare zone 4.

== History ==
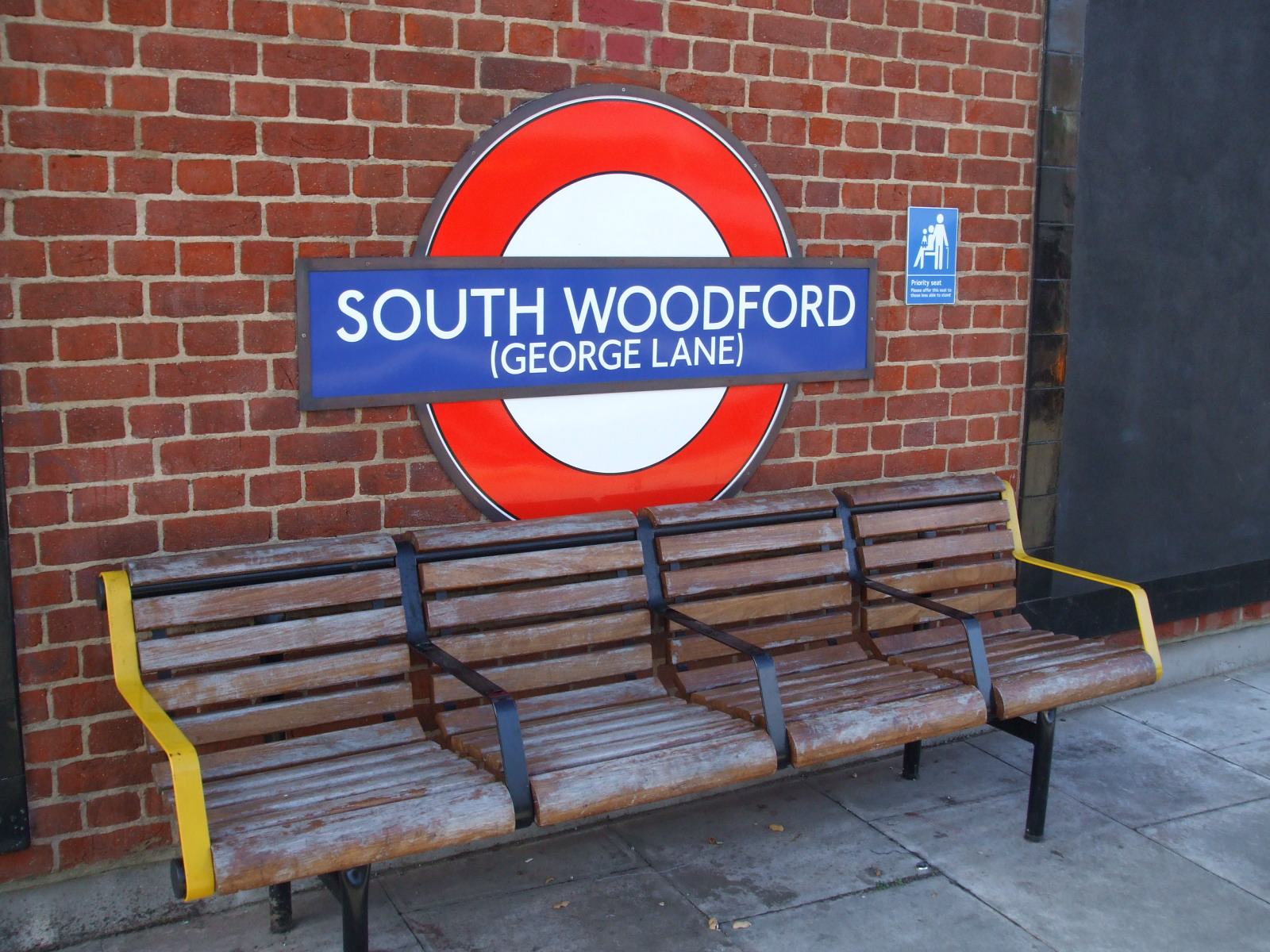
Station roundel on the eastbound platform, showing the old suffix.

The station opened on 22 August 1856 as part of the Eastern Counties Railway branch to Loughton which opened that day. Originally named George Lane, the station was renamed twice: South Woodford (George Lane) on 5 July 1937; and South Woodford on 14 December 1947. The station formed part of the Great Eastern Railway's system until that company amalgamated with other railways to create the London and North Eastern Railway (LNER) in 1923. On 5 July 1937 the station was renamed "South Woodford (George Lane)".

The station was subsequently transferred to form part of London Underground's Central line on 14 December 1947 when Central line services were extended from Leytonstone to Woodford. This formed a part of the long planned, and delayed, Eastern Extension of the Central line that was part of the London Passenger Transport Board's "New Works Programme" of 1935 – 1940. After transferring to London Underground the "(George Lane)" suffix fell out of use, though it remains on some roundel signs. (Note: "(George Lane)" appears on the 1949 tube map, but not on the 1951 map. Harris and Rose both indicate that the name change occurred in 1950.)

During the planning of the Victoria line, route options included a continuation of the line from Walthamstow Central to Woodford or South Woodford stations. However, in 1961, the decision was taken to build only as far as Walthamstow Central.

== The station today ==
The station has two entrances, one on each side of the line. George Lane originally crossed the railway tracks with a level crossing immediately to the north of the station, but this was closed and the road split into two when the line was electrified. The footbridge can be used without a ticket as, unusually for stations on the Epping branch, the footbridge is outside the ticket gateline. For some years the station had step-free access to and from the eastbound platform only. The ramp to the westbound platform was installed and opened in March 2019, making the station fully step-free.

== Station improvements ==
The station underwent considerable renovations in 2006, 150 years after it opened. Five new CCTV cameras were installed in the station underpass with the intention of improving security as, in addition to the multimillion-pound station refurbishment work being undertaken, crime statistics showed South Woodford station had the highest record of violent crime in Redbridge and the underpass was seen as a security risk, particularly after dark. The rebuilding of the section of westbound platform damaged by fire was also completed and the paint scheme was a mix of white, blue and orange. However, the footbridge over the tracks at the east end was not repainted.

== Services and connections ==
South Woodford station is on the Central line in London fare zone 4. It is between Snaresbrook to the west and Woodford to the east. Train frequencies vary throughout the day, but generally operate every 3–7 minutes between 07:03 and 22:39 eastbound and between 06:22 and 22:19 westbound.

London Bus routes 179, W12, W13 and W14, and night route N55 serve the station.

Preceding station	London Underground	Following station
Snaresbrook towards Ealing Broadway or West Ruislip	Central line	Woodford towards Epping
Historical railways
Snaresbrook; Line and station open	Great Eastern Railway; Eastern Counties Railway; Loughton branch	Woodford; Line and station open

== Notes and references ==
=== Bibliography ===
- Allen, Cecil J. (1956) [1955]. The Great Eastern Railway (2nd ed.). Hampton Court: Ian Allan.
- Butt, R.V.J. (1995). The Directory of Railway Stations. Yeovil: Patrick Stephens Ltd. ISBN 1-85260-508-1. R508.
- Leboff, David (1994). London Underground Stations. Ian Allan. ISBN 978-0-7110-2226-3.
