= Leytonstone tube station =

London Underground station

Leytonstone
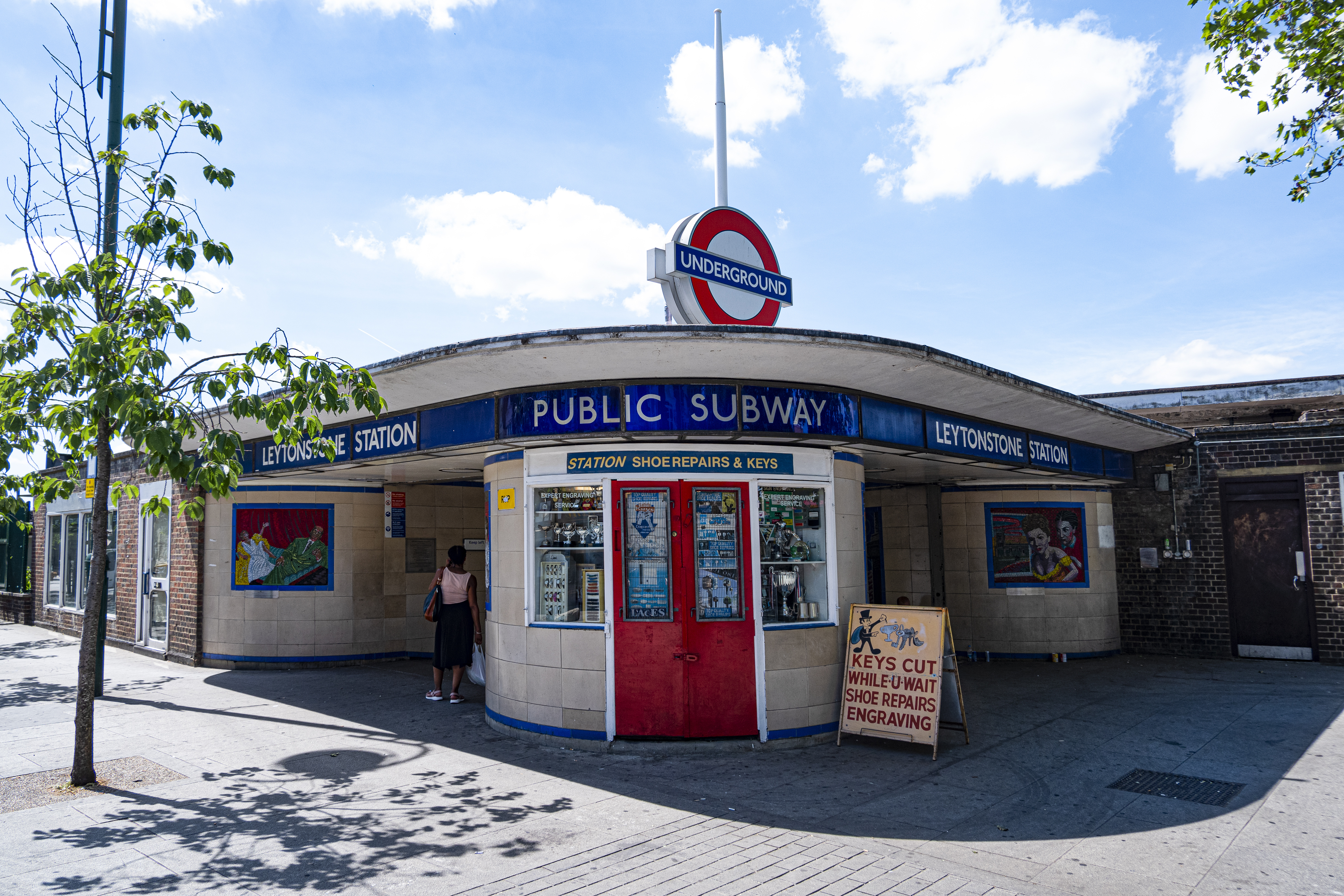
- Eastern entrance on Church Lane
- Interactive map of Leytonstone

General information
- Location: Leytonstone
- Local authority: London Borough of Waltham Forest
- Managed by: London Underground
- Number of platforms: 3
- Fare zone: 3 and 4
- OSI: Leytonstone High Road

London Underground annual entry and exit
- 2021: ▼4.26 million
- 2022: ▲6.70 million
- 2023: ▲6.96 million
- 2024: ▼6.85 million
- 2025: ▼6.65 million

Railway companies
- Original company: Eastern Counties Railway
- Pre-grouping: Great Eastern Railway
- Post-grouping: London and North Eastern Railway

Key dates
- 22 August 1856: Opened
- 5 May 1947: Central line service introduced
- 1 September 1955: Goods yard closed

Other information
- External links: TfL station info page
- Coordinates: 51.5683°N 0.0083°E

Leytonstone (/ˈleɪtənstoʊn/) is a London Underground station in Leytonstone, in the London Borough of Waltham Forest, east London. It is a stop on the Central line, between Leyton and Snaresbrook (on the direct route towards Epping) or Wanstead (on the Hainault loop towards Woodford) stations. The station is located at the boundary of London fare zone 3 and 4, close to Whipps Cross University Hospital. It is a terminus for some services and returns westbound.

== History ==
The railway line from Loughton Branch Junction (on the Lea Valley line between Stratford and Lea Bridge) to Loughton was built by the Eastern Counties Railway and opened on 22 August 1856. A station at Leytonstone was opened on the same day. In turn, from 1862, it became part of the Great Eastern Railway system and part of the London & North Eastern Railway in 1923; it was transferred to London Transport in 1947. This formed part of the New Works Programme (1935–1940) that was to see major changes at Leytonstone with the station becoming the junction of the existing Loughton-Epping-Ongar line, newly electrified, with the new tube tunnel running under Eastern Avenue towards Newbury Park. This work saw a complete reconstruction of the station along with the removal of the level crossing at Church Lane and its replacement by an underbridge. The work stopped in May 1940 due to wartime priorities; further delays were caused by the station buildings being hit by a German bomb in January 1944.

During the war, the new tunnels were used as an aircraft component factory; the part closest to Leytonstone was a public air-raid shelter.

The station was first served by the Central line on 5 May 1947, when it became the temporary terminus of the line, passengers changing to steam shuttle onwards to Epping. This ceased on 14 December 1947, with the extension of Underground services to Woodford and Newbury Park.

=== Notable events ===
- In honour of the centenary of the birth of film director Sir Alfred Hitchcock (born 13 August 1899 in Leytonstone), the London Borough of Waltham Forest commissioned the Greenwich Mural Workshop to create a series of mosaics of Hitchcock's life and works in the tube station. Work was started in June 2000 and the mosaics were unveiled on 3 May 2001.
- Three people were injured inside the station's ticket hall during the evening of 5 December 2015, with one suffering serious knife injuries. The Metropolitan Police arrested the attacker inside the station after using tasers against him. Video footage later emerged of the attacker repeatedly shouting "this is for Syria". A remark shouted at the attacker by a witness, "You ain’t no Muslim, bruv", resulted in considerable media comment and was subsequently praised by the then Prime Minister, David Cameron.

== Services ==
Leytonstone station is on the Central line in London fare zones 3 and 4. Train frequencies vary throughout the day, but generally operate every 5–10 minutes between 05:36 and 00:56 eastbound, and between 05:32 and 00:07 westbound.

== Connections ==
London Buses routes 66, 145, 257, 339, W13, W12, W15, W16, W19 and night route N8 serve the station and bus station.

| Preceding station | London Underground | Following station |
|---|---|---|
| Leyton towards Ealing Broadway or West Ruislip | Central line | Snaresbrook towards Epping |
| Leyton towards Ealing Broadway or West Ruislip | Central line | Wanstead towards Hainault or Woodford via Newbury Park |
Out of system interchange
| Preceding station | London Overground | Following station |
| Leyton Midland Road towards Gospel Oak | Suffragette line Gospel Oak to Barking line transfer at Leytonstone High Road | Wanstead Park towards Barking Riverside |
Historical railways
| Leyton; Line and station open | Great Eastern Railway; Eastern Counties Railway; Loughton branch | Snaresbrook; Line and station open |
