= List of schools in the London Borough of Redbridge =

This is the list of schools in the Redbridge Borough of London, England.

== State-funded schools ==
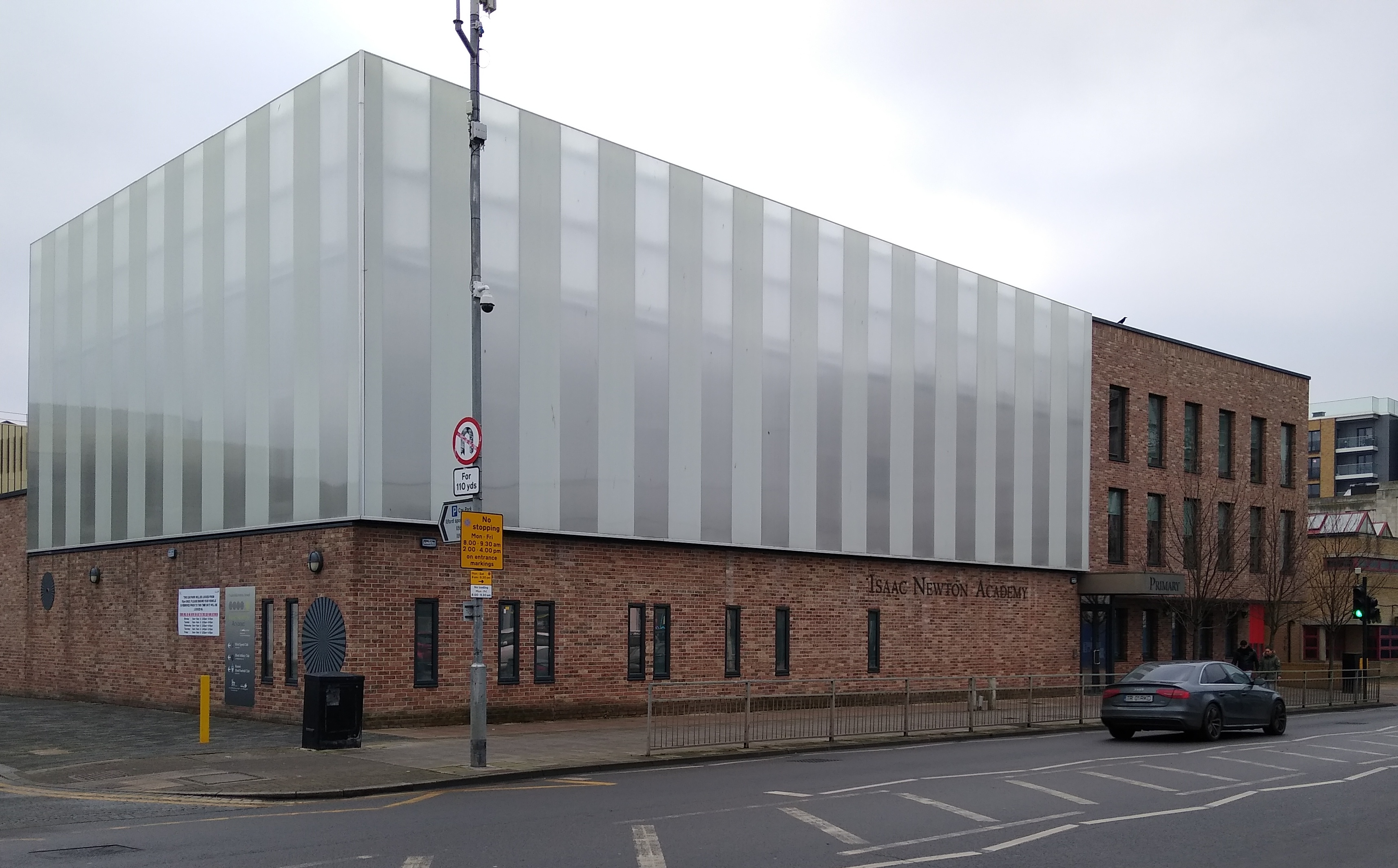
Isaac Newton Academy

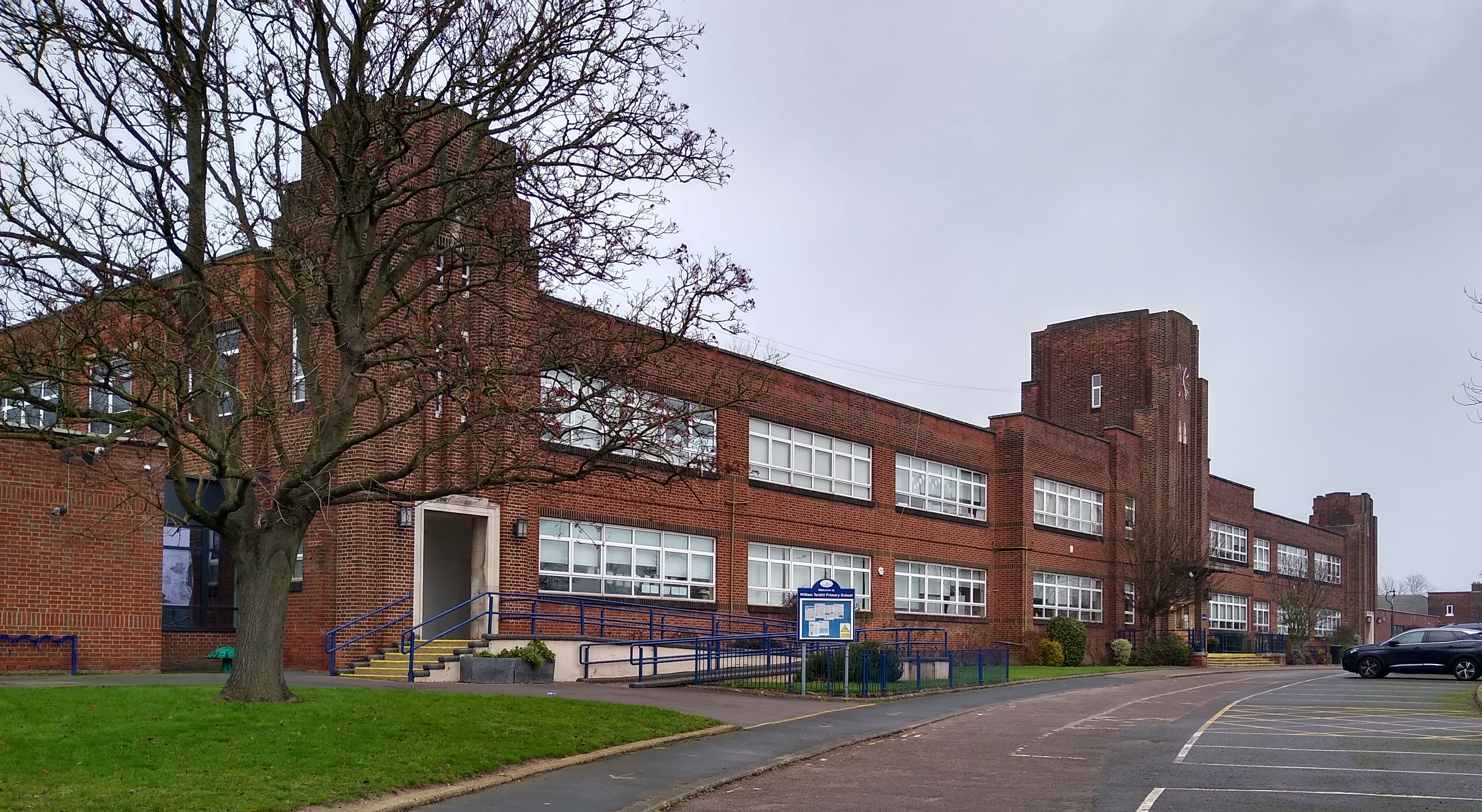
William Torbitt Primary School

=== Primary schools ===
- Aldborough Primary School
- Aldersbrook Primary School
- Al-Noor Muslim Primary School
- Avanti Court Primary School
- ARK Isaac Newton Academy
- ATAM Academy
- Barley Lane Primary School
- Chadwell Primary School
- Christchurch Primary School
- Churchfields Infants' School
- Churchfields Junior School
- Cleveland Road Primary School
- Clore Tikva School
- Coppice Primary School
- Cranbrook Primary School
- Downshall Primary School
- Fairlop Primary School
- Farnham Green Primary School
- Fullwood Primary School
- Gearies Primary School
- Gilbert Colvin Primary School
- Glade Primary School
- Goodmayes Primary School
- Gordon Primary School
- Grove Primary School
- Highlands Primary School
- John Bramston Primary School
- Loxford School
- Manford Primary School
- Mayespark Primary School
- Mossford Green Primary School
- Newbury Park Primary School
- Nightingale Primary School
- Oakdale Infants' School
- Oakdale Junior School
- Our Lady of Lourdes RC Primary School
- Parkhill Infants' School
- Parkhill Junior School
- Ray Lodge Primary School
- Redbridge Primary School
- Roding Primary School
- Seven Kings School
- St Aidan's RC Primary Academy
- St Antony's RC Primary School
- St Augustine's RC Primary School
- St Bede's RC Primary School
- SS Peter and Paul's RC Primary School
- Snaresbrook Primary School
- South Park Primary School
- Uphall Primary School
- Wanstead Church School
- Winston Way Academy
- William Torbitt Primary School
- Winston Way Academy
- Wohl Ilford Jewish Primary School
- Woodlands Primary School

=== Non-selective secondary schools ===
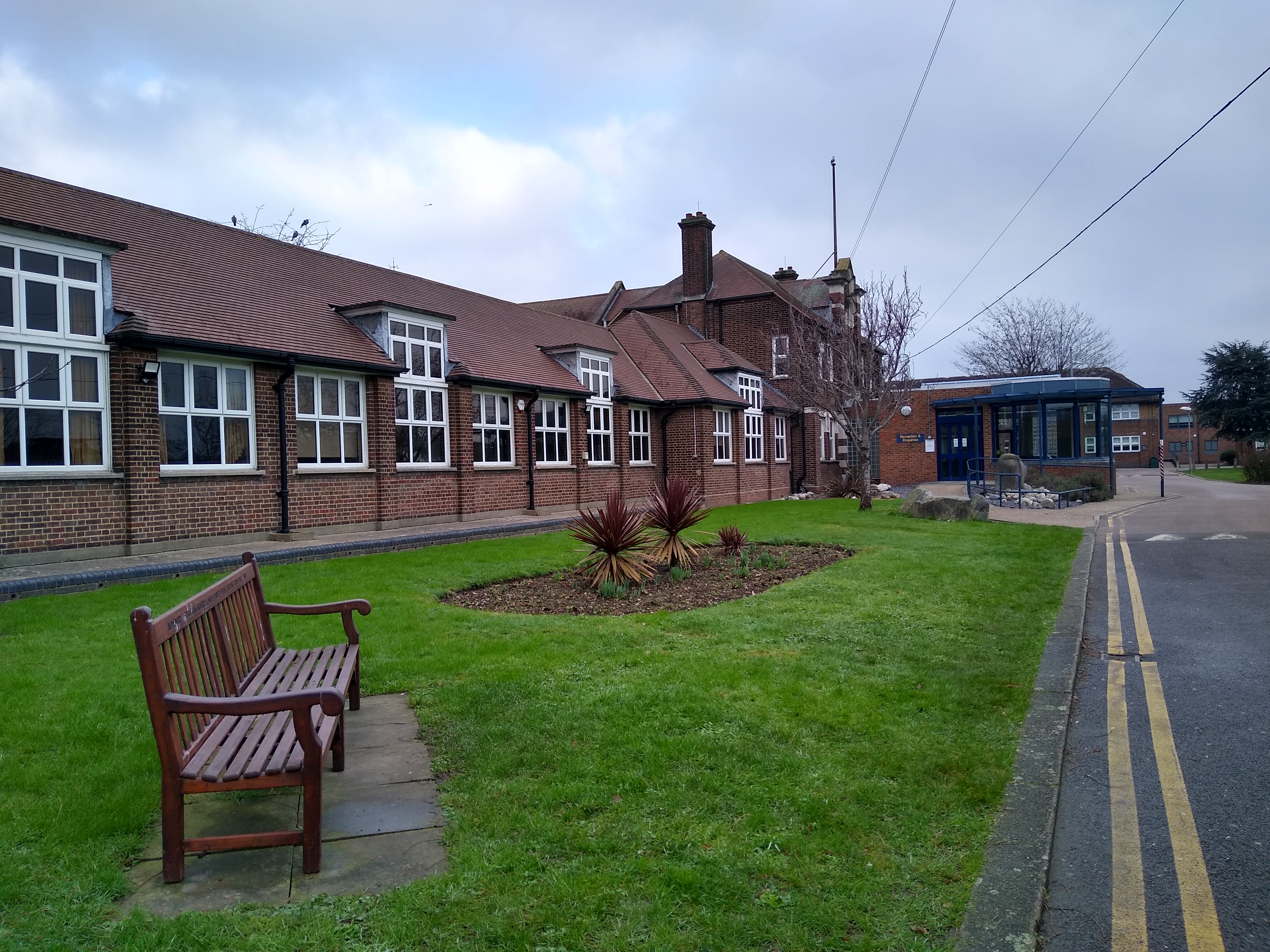
Seven Kings School

- ARK Isaac Newton Academy
- ATAM Academy
- Beal High School
- Caterham High School
- Chadwell Heath Academy
- The Forest Academy
- King Solomon High School
- Loxford School
- Mayfield School
- Oaks Park High School
- The Palmer Catholic Academy
- Seven Kings School
- Trinity Catholic High School
- Ursuline Academy Ilford
- Valentines High School
- Wanstead High School
- Woodbridge High School

=== Grammar schools ===
- Ilford County High School
- Woodford County High School For Girls

=== Special and alternative schools ===
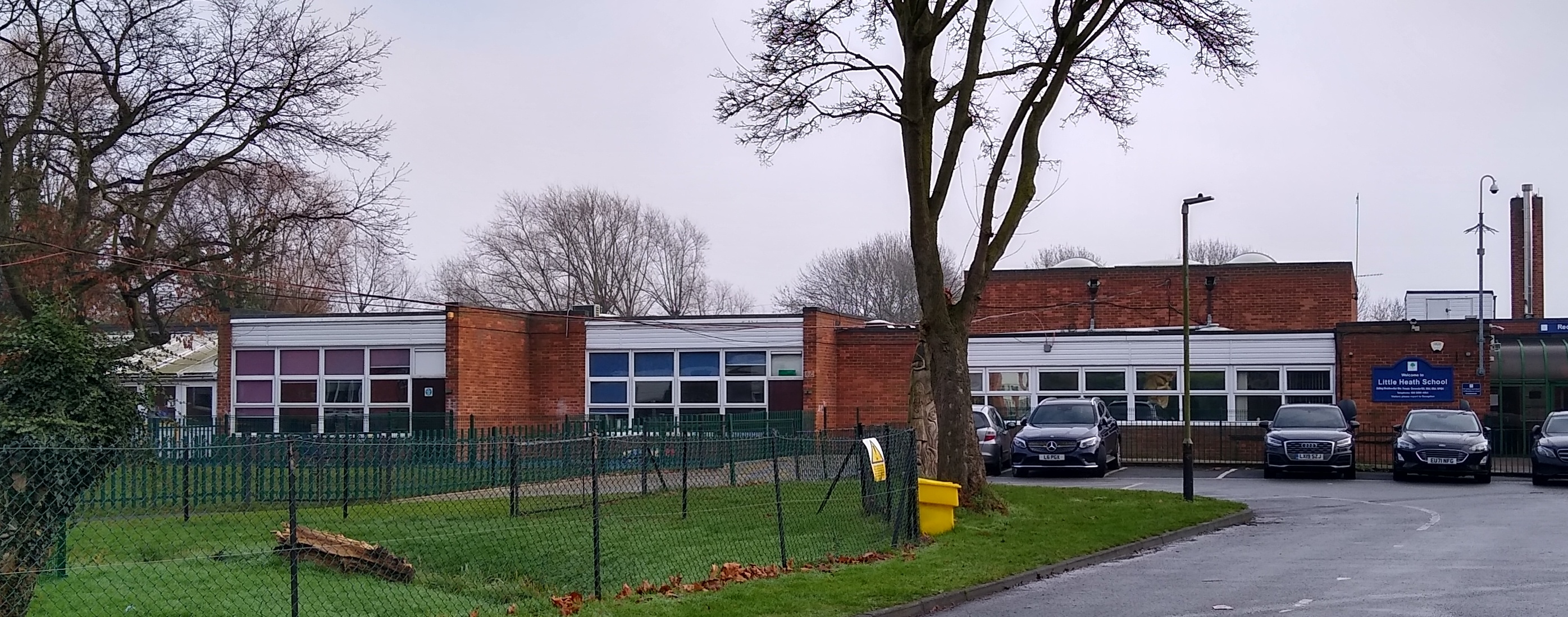
Little Heath School

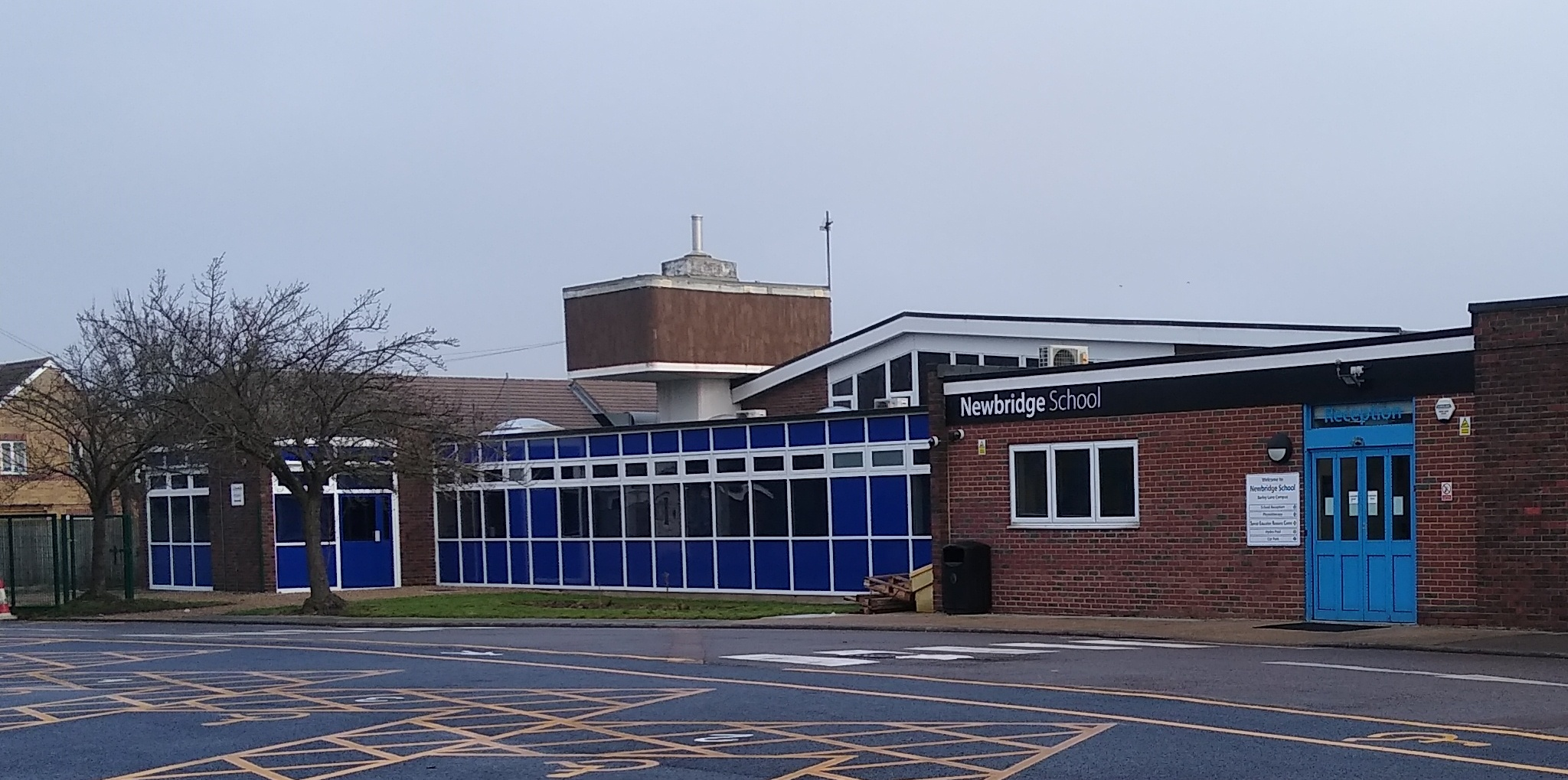
Newbridge School

- Beacon Business Innovation Hub
- The Constance Bridgeman Centre
- Hatchside School
- Hatton School
- Little Heath School
- New Rush Hall School
- Newbridge School
- Redbridge Alternative Provision

=== Further education ===
- Redbridge College
- Redbridge Institute of Adult Education

== Independent schools ==
=== Primary and preparatory schools ===
- Apex Primary School
- Avon House School (Closed July 2026)
- Beehive Preparatory School
- Eastcourt Independent School
- St Aubyn's School
- Snaresbrook Preparatory School
- The Ursuline Prep School Ilford
- Woodford Green Preparatory School

=== Senior and all-through schools ===
- Bancroft's School
- Read Academy Education

=== Special and alternative schools ===
- Endeavour House School
- Oak House School
- Stradbroke

=== Further education ===
- Mont Rose College of Management and Sciences
