= TPCA =

TPCA may refer to:

- The Palmer Catholic Academy, a school in Ilford, London, England
- The Primacy Collegiate Academy, a school in Taipei, Taiwan
- Toyota Peugeot Citroën Automobile Czech, an automobile manufacturing plant in Kolín, Czech Republic, since 2021 known as Toyota Motor Manufacturing Czech Republic
