= St Alban's Church, Ilford =

Church in London, England

Coordinates: 51.55662°N 0.07626°E

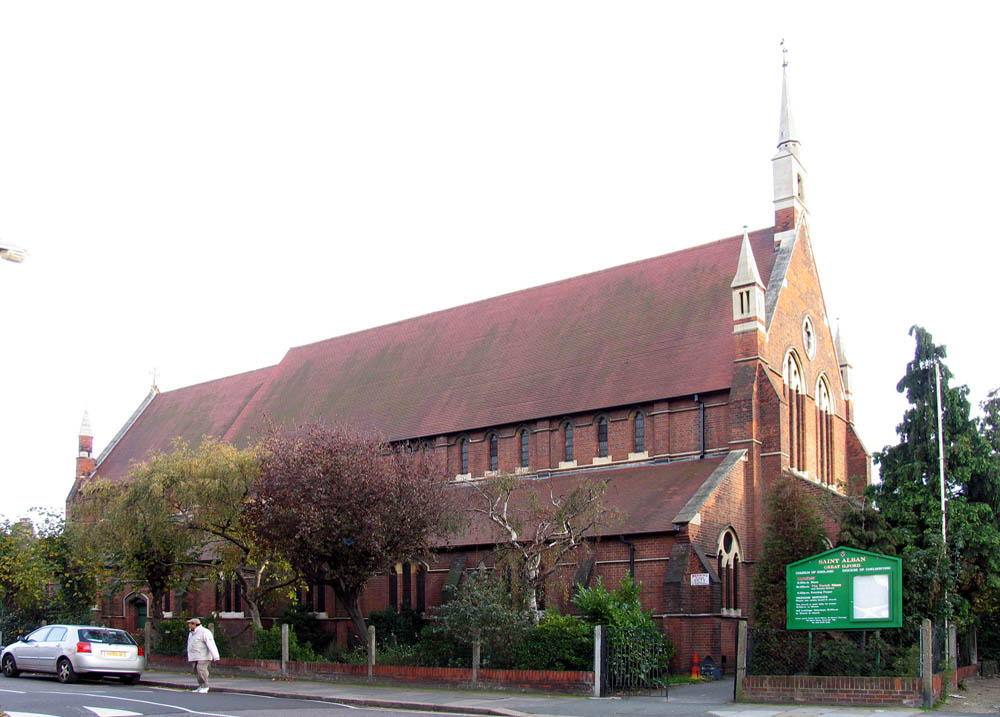
St Alban's Church, Ilford.

St Alban's Church, Ilford, is a Church of England church and parish in Ilford, part of the London Borough of Redbridge. It began as a temporary building, replaced by a permanent Neo-Gothic redbrick one on Albert Road built between 1900 and 1906. Both of these were chapels of ease to St Clement's Church, Ilford until the formation of a separate parish of St Alban's in 1958 It is now a Forward in Faith parish

St. Alban's Singers, a choir for mixed voices (SATB), is based in the church.
