= Eileen Ash =

English cricketer (1911–2021)

- Ash in 1936

Personal information
- Full name: Eileen May Ash (née Whelan)
- Born: 30 October 1911; Highbury, Middlesex, England
- Died: 3 December 2021 (aged 110 years, 34 days); Norwich, Norfolk, England
- Bowling: Right-arm medium
- Role: Bowler

International information
- National side: England (1937–1948/49)
- Test debut (cap 18): 12 June 1937 v Australia
- Last Test: 29 March 1949 v New Zealand

Domestic team information
- Years: Team
- 1949: Middlesex

Career statistics
Competition	WTest	WFC
Matches	7	22
Runs scored	38	180
Batting average	4.75	11.25
100s/50s	0/0	0/0
Top score	10	34*
Balls bowled	594	2,074
Wickets	10	32
Bowling average	23.00	20.50
5 wickets in innings	0	0
10 wickets in match	0	0
Best bowling	3/35	4/41
Catches/stumpings	3/–	13/–
- Source: CricketArchive, 26 January 2022

Eileen May Ash (née Whelan; 30 October 1911 – 3 December 2021) was an English cricketer and supercentenarian who played primarily as a right-arm medium bowler.

As Eileen Whelan, she appeared in seven Test matches for England between 1937 and 1948/49. Ash was the longest-lived international cricketer, living to the age of 110 years and 34 days.

== Early life and education ==
Eileen May Whelan was born in Highbury, Middlesex. She attended Ursuline Convent in Ilford, east London, where she captained the First XI hockey team, and also played tennis and netball.

== Cricket career ==
Ash played club cricket for the Ilford Wanderers and Wagtails teams, and top level domestic cricket for Civil Service, Middlesex, and South of England. She also played Test cricket both before and after World War II, making her debut against Australia at Northampton in June 1937, and playing her last Test against New Zealand in Auckland in March 1949. A specialist bowler, she took ten Test wickets at an average of 23.00.

Ash's best career performance came against a Victoria Country XI in a tour match in 1949 with an all-round display scoring an unbeaten century and taking five wickets in the match which also propelled England to a comfortable 170 run win. Also in 1949, she met Australian cricketer Don Bradman at a French restaurant in Sydney, and received a bat signed by him.

== Working life and retirement ==
Ash was employed by the Civil Service from the age of 18. She was seconded to MI6 during World War II, and went on to work with that organisation for eleven years. Ash and her husband eventually retired to Norwich. She took up golf in later life, only quitting aged 98.

== Centenarian ==
In 2011, Ash became the first female Test cricketer to live to 100 years old. She was made an honorary life member of the Marylebone Cricket Club (MCC) to mark the occasion. Writing for the BBC in February 2017, Heather Knight, England's captain, commented:

I had the absolute privilege of meeting Eileen Ash, the oldest living Test cricketer (male or female) for some filming before I left for Australia, and she is easily one of the most extraordinary ladies I've ever met. She's 105, does yoga every week and I've met teenagers who have a lot less energy than she does! It was amazing to hear some of her experiences of playing cricket for England, especially the boat trips they used to have to take to play in Australia, and she also took me through her yoga routine. My pride, and a number of my muscle groups, are still in tatters after being put to shame by a 105-year-old.

In July 2017, aged 105, Ash rang the bell at Lord's to signal the start of play at the 2017 Women's World Cup Final, which England won against India. She rang the bell for five minutes at Lord's in order to commemorate the 80th anniversary of her international debut. To mark her 106th birthday, she was taken for a flight in a Tiger Moth. In November 2018, she opened a sports hall named in her honour at The Hewett Academy in Norwich. In 2019, the MCC unveiled a portrait of her at Lord's.

In January 2021, aged 109, she became one of the oldest people in the UK to receive a COVID-19 vaccine. Ash celebrated her 110th birthday on 30 October 2021 at the Norwich care home in which she resided. She died just under five weeks later, on 3 December 2021.
