= South Park, Ilford =

Public park near London

South Park
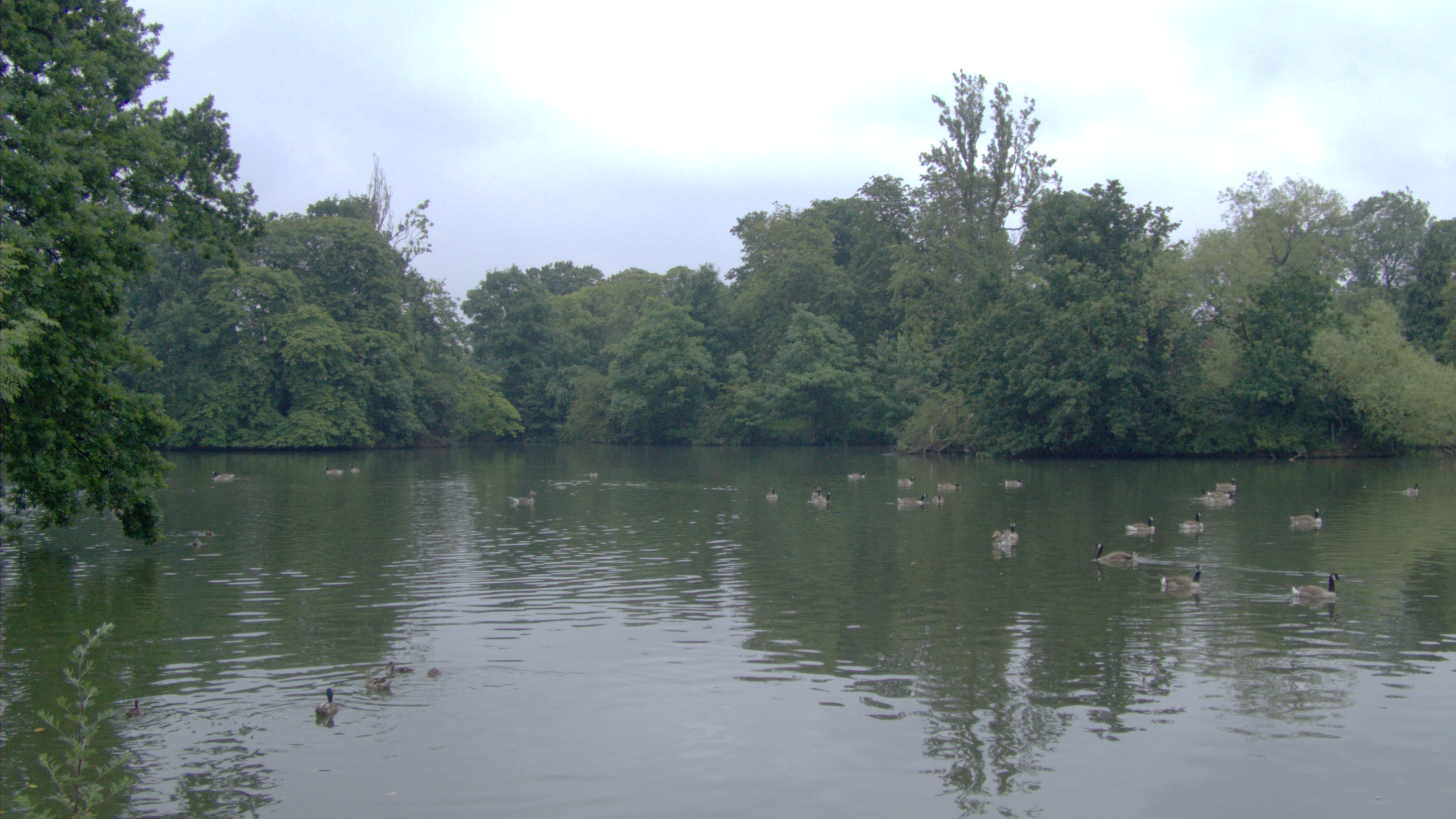
- South Park Lake
- Interactive map of South Park
- Type: Public park
- Location: Ilford, Greater London, UK
- Coordinates: 51°33′24″N 0°05′29″E
- Area: 13.5 ha
- Created: 1902
- Operator: London Borough of Redbridge
- Status: Open year round
- Website: South Park, Ilford

South Park is an Edwardian park to the south of Ilford, East London. It is one of the largest open spaces in the London Borough of Redbridge. It has recently been awarded Green Flag status.

== History ==
The park was formerly open fields. In the mid-nineteenth century, the barracks of the Second Essex Rifle Volunteers was located there. This was one of several Rifle Volunteer militias intended to combat a potential French invasion. A short lived football club (South Park FC) was founded in 1867 and was based at the park.

The land was sold to Ilford Council in 1899 for £11,200 (equivalent to £1,560,000 in 2024) by a farmer, Walter Mills. A further £19,000 (equivalent to £2,640,000 in 2024) was spent converting it into a park, which was opened 10 May 1902.

In the 1920s, the clock tower was moved from Ilford Broadway to the park entrance because it was in the way of road improvements. Th clock was destroyed in the Second World War by German bombers.

== Geography ==
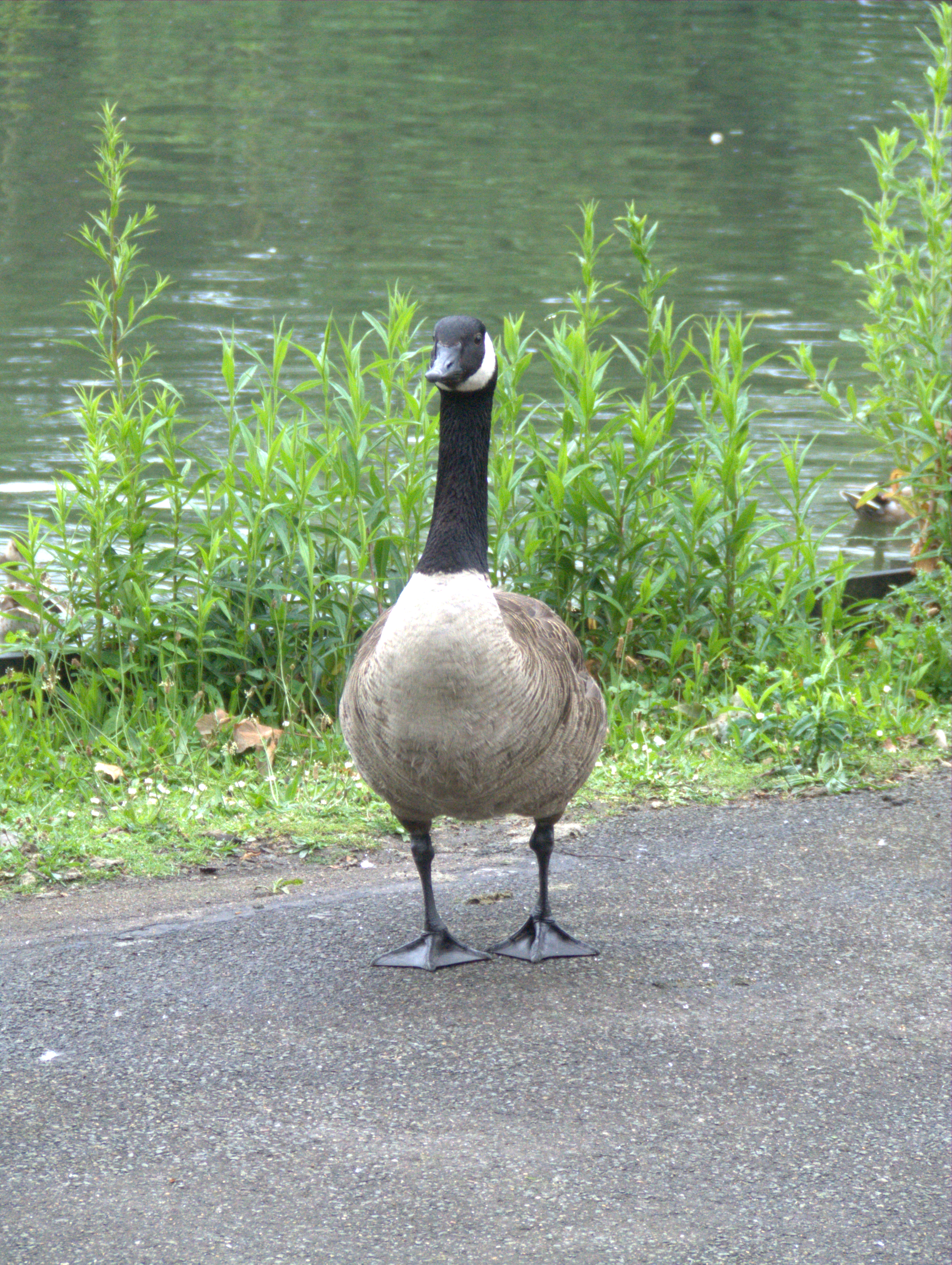
A Canada goose next to the lake in South Park

The park is 13.5 hectares (33 acres) located to the south of Green Lane (A 1083) and west of South Park Drive. The park opened to the public on 10 May 1902. It contains a number of large trees, a lake which is fed by Loxford Water and leisure facilities including Tennis courts and Football pitches.

== Wildlife ==
The park provides a home to a number of wildlife species, including mallard ducks, tufted ducks, pochard, Canada geese, Greylag geese, and Mute Swan. Great Cormorant, Grey Heron and Egyptian geese are also frequently seen.

In 2011, a new Wildlife Education & Information Centre was opened in the old boat house as a partnership between the London Borough of Redbridge and the South Park User Group.

The park is known as a haven for bats, and an annual bat-sighting walk is organised every September by the London Borough of Redbridge. There are three species which are commonly present, the Common pipistrelle, the Soprano pipistrelle, and the Common noctule. Daubenton's bat is less commonly sighted.

== Surrounding area ==
The area around the park has become known as South Park and the nearby primary school, the catchment area of which covers a large part of the south of Redbridge, is known as South Park Primary School. SS Peter and Paul also has catchment area in this area for catholic children

== Gallery ==
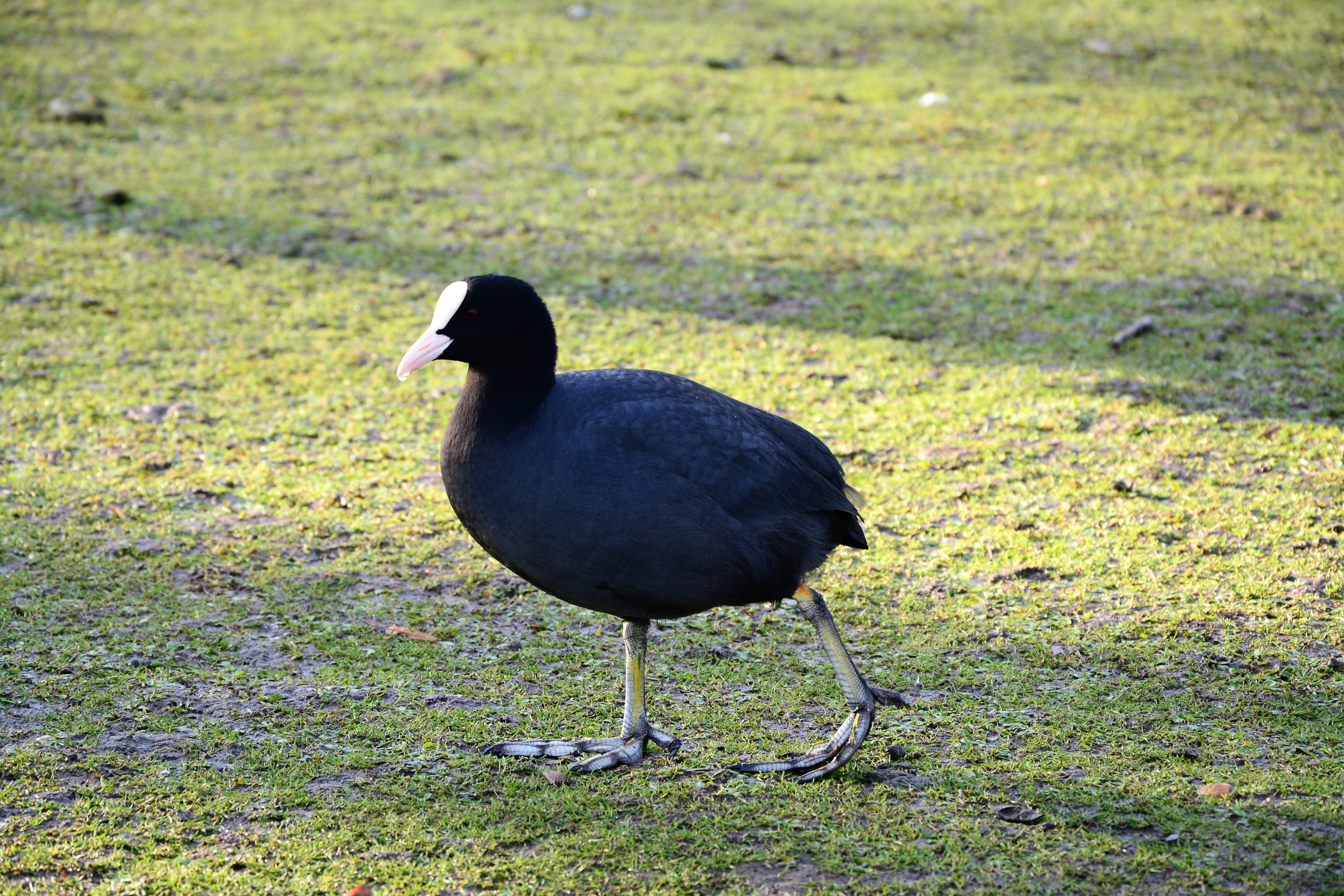
Coot in South Park

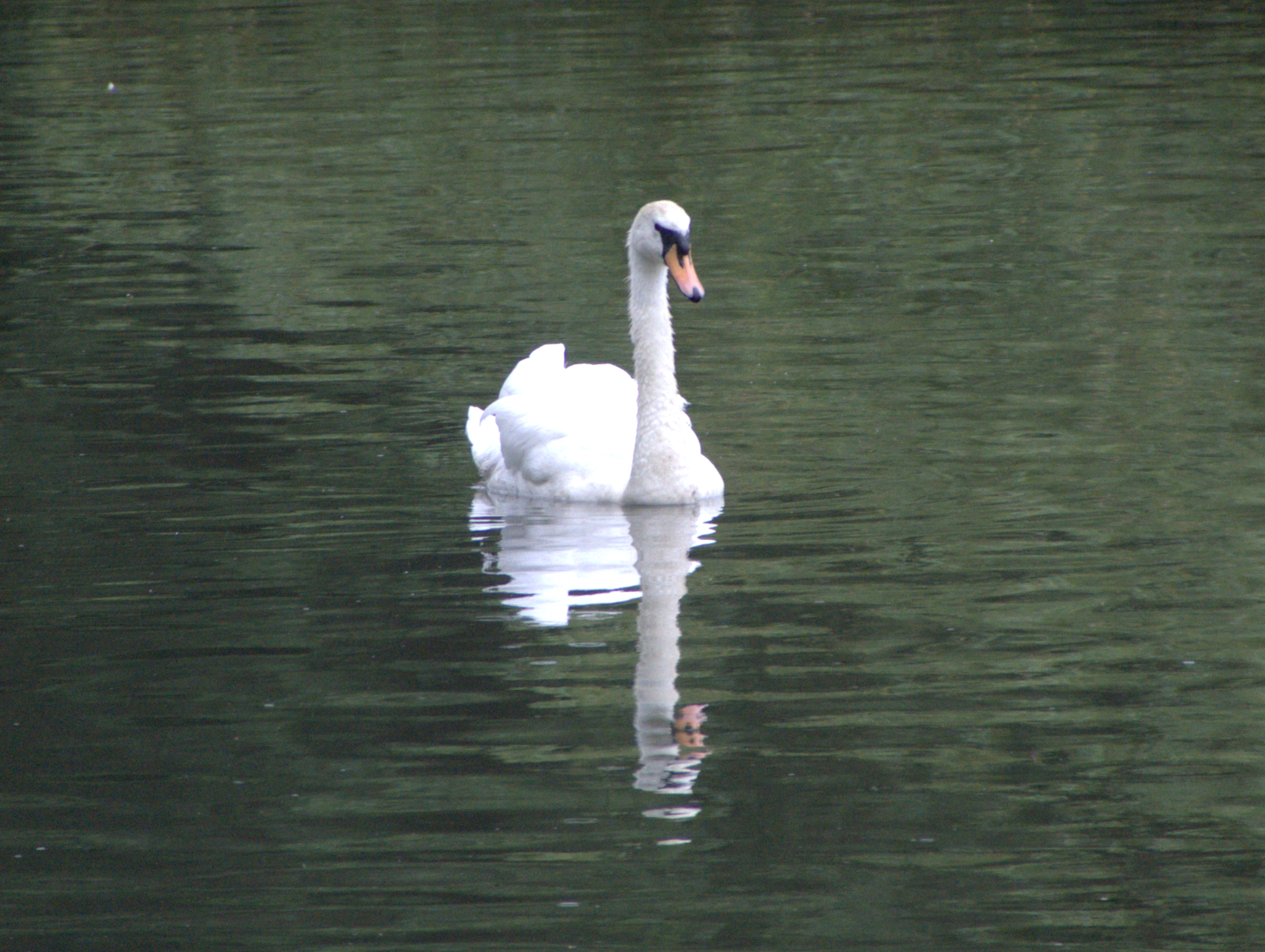
A mute swan in South Park

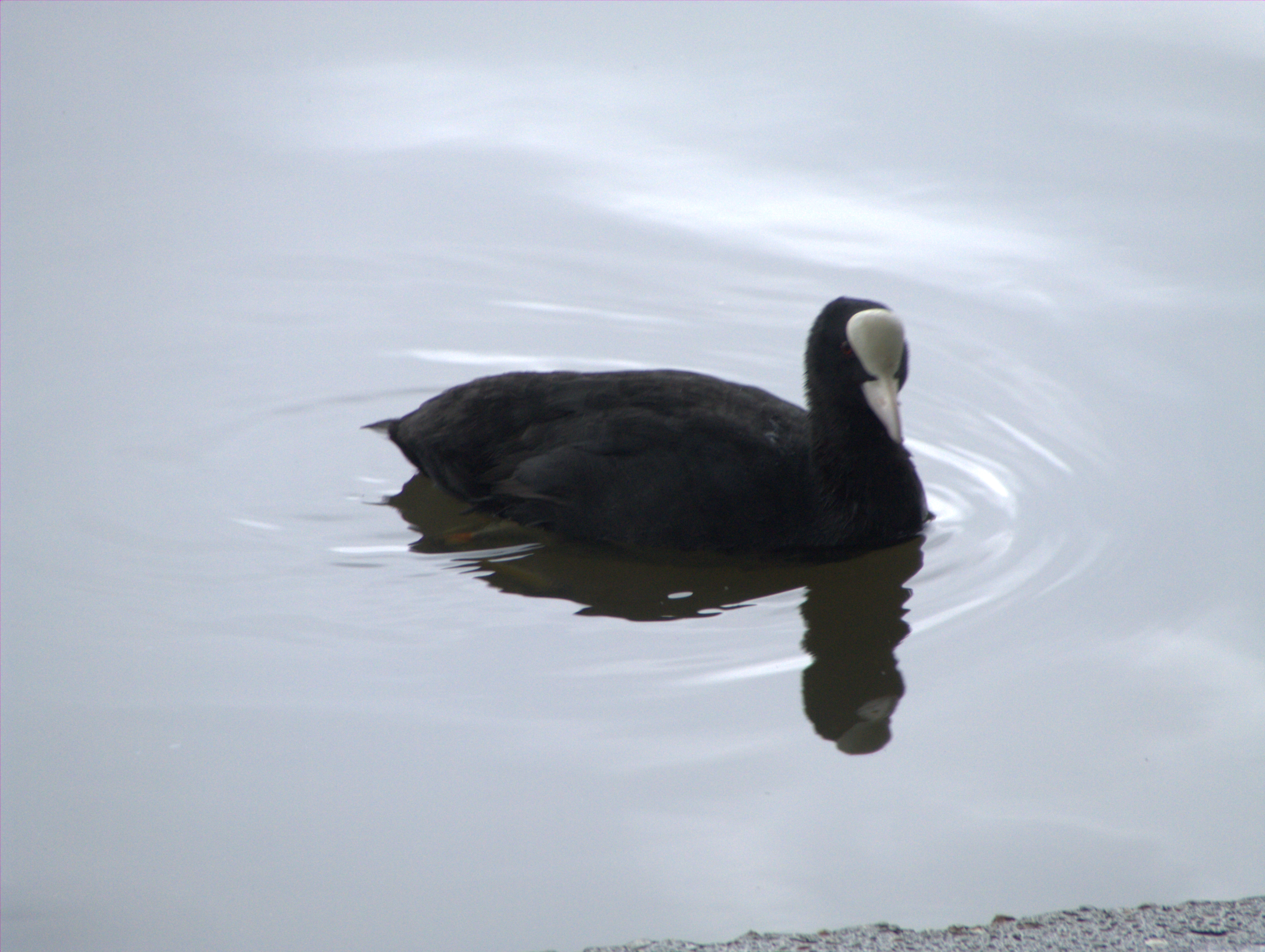
A coot in South Park

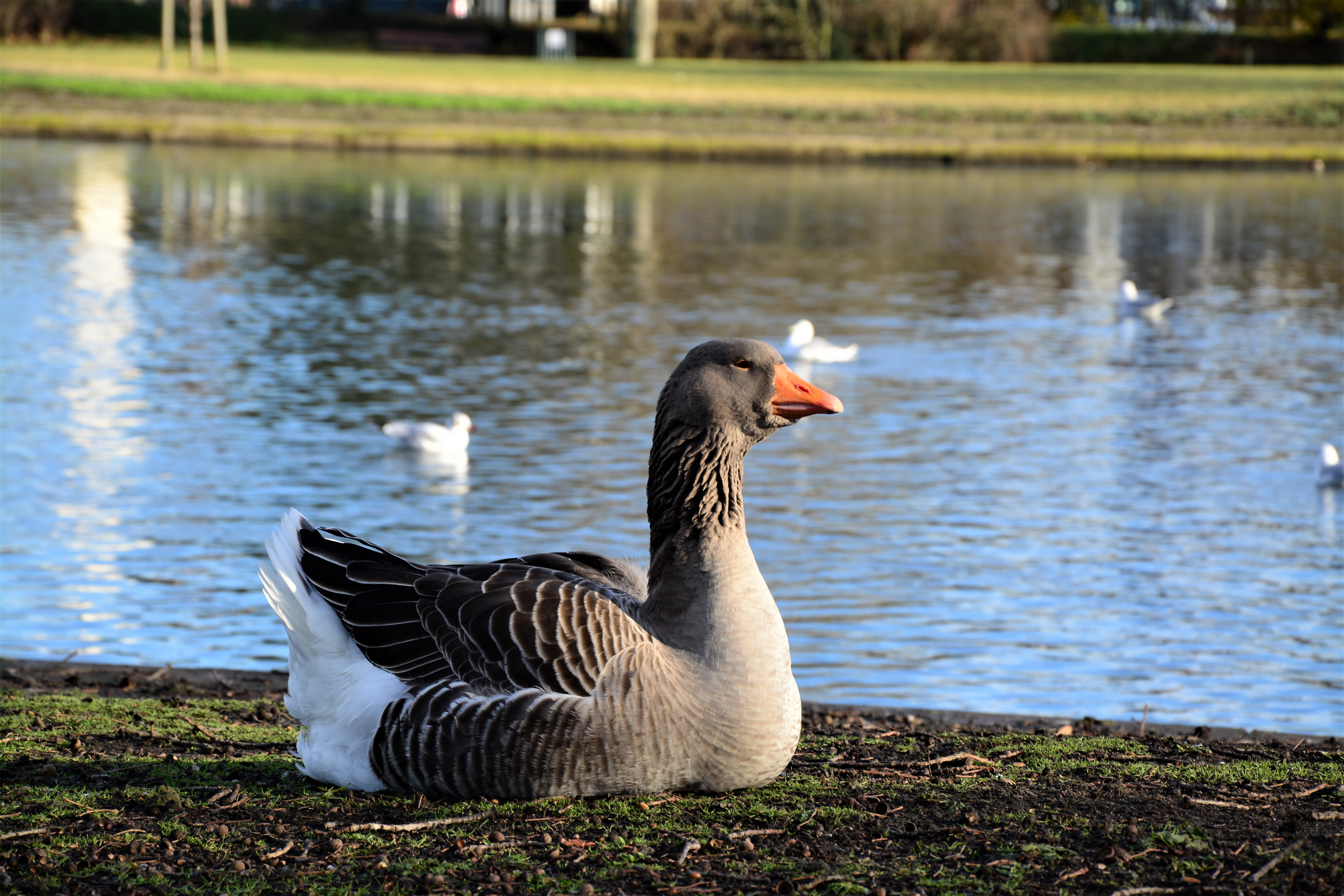
Toulouse Goose near the lake

== See also ==
- South Park Primary School
- Valentines Park, a nearby park
