= Little Heath School, Redbridge =

Coordinates: 51.584037°N 0.118699°E

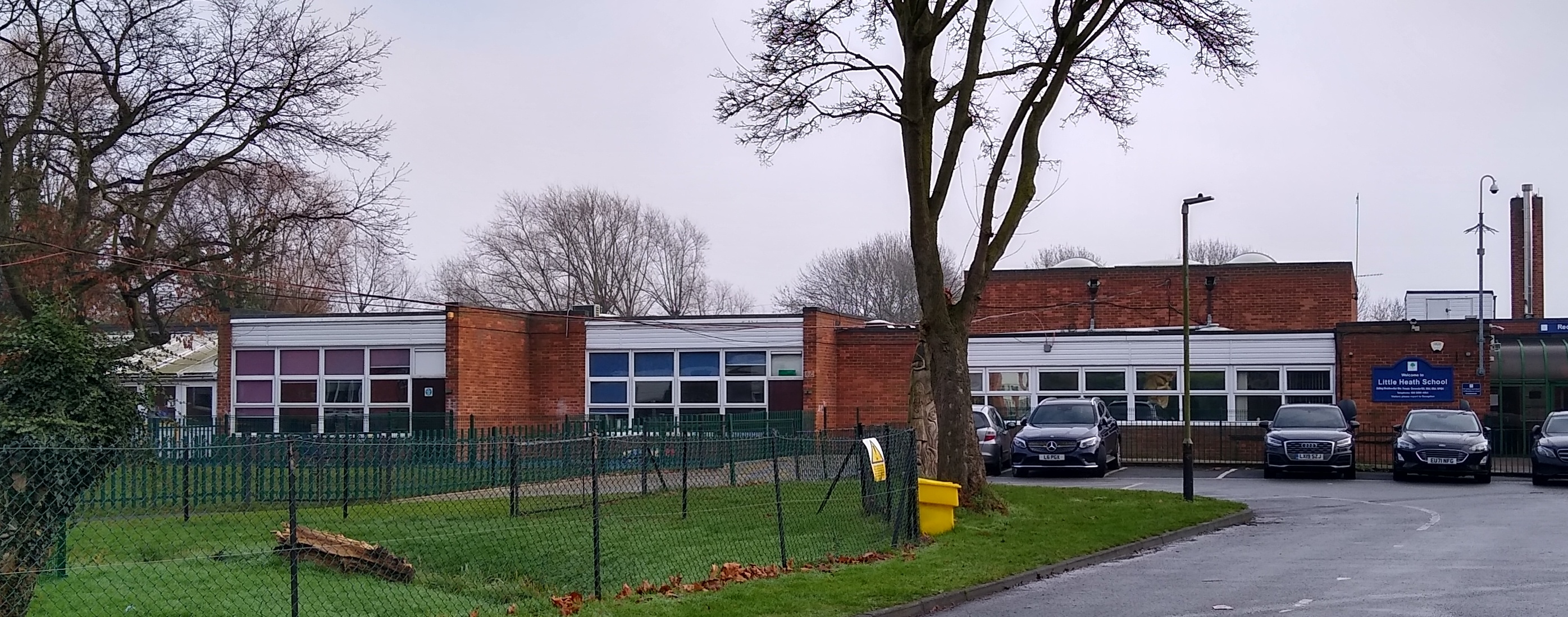

Location
- Hainault Road; Little Heath; Romford, Essex, RM6 5RX; England

Information
- Type: Secondary special school
- Local authority: London Borough of Redbridge
- Department for Education URN: 102878 Tables
- Ofsted: Reports
- Head teacher: Fawzia Govender
- Gender: Coeducational
- Age: 11 to 19
- Enrolment: 199
- Capacity: 195
- Website: www.lheath.net

Little Heath School is a secondary special school in the Little Heath, Ilford in the east of the London Borough of Redbridge, England. There are currently 142 pupils aged between 11 and 19 on roll. They all have a variety of special educational needs including general learning difficulties, language and communication difficulties, autism spectrum disorders and other more complex needs. The headteacher is Fawzia Govender.
