= Ilford =

Town in East London, England

Coordinates: 51°33′27″N 00°05′09″E

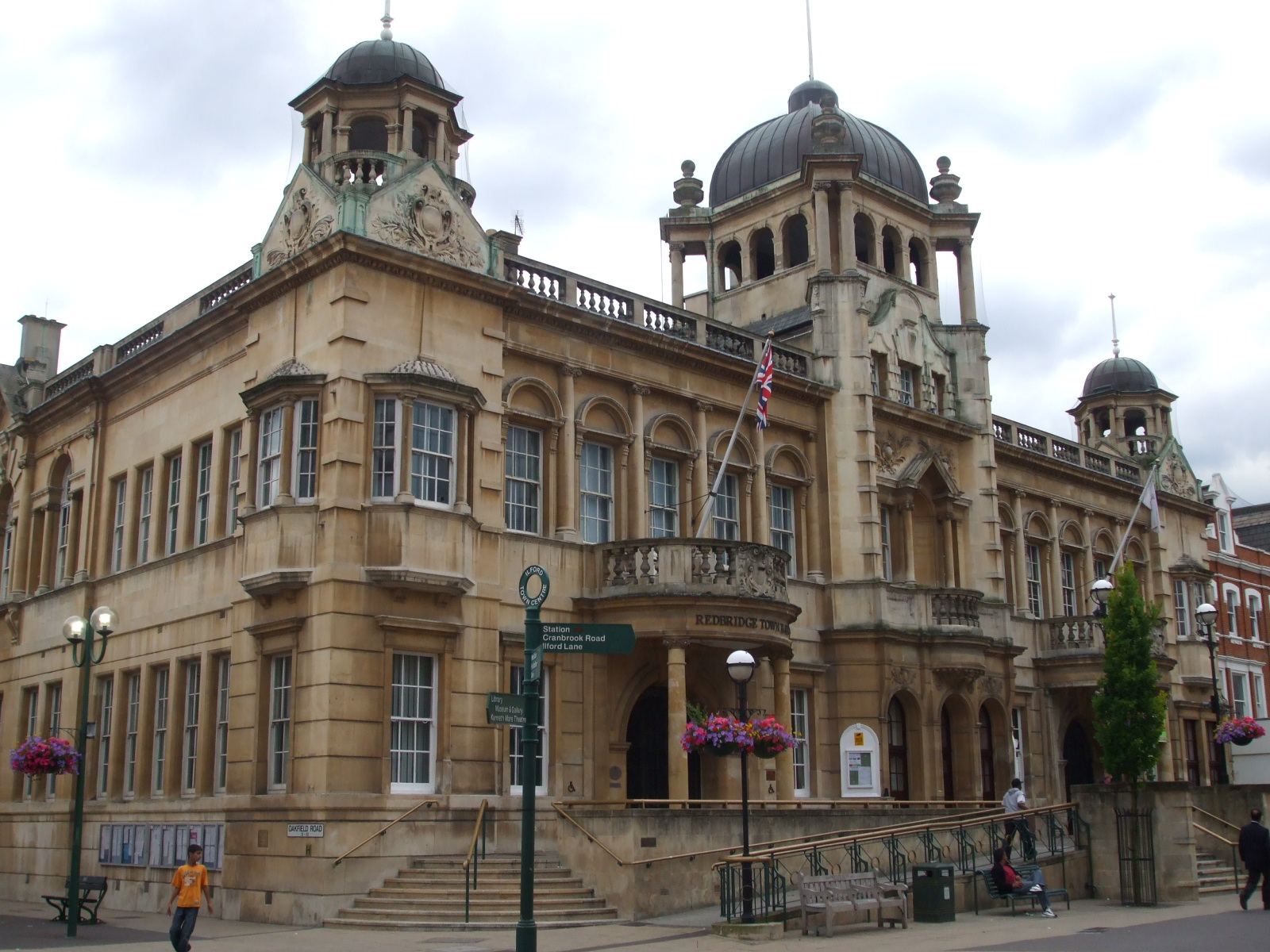
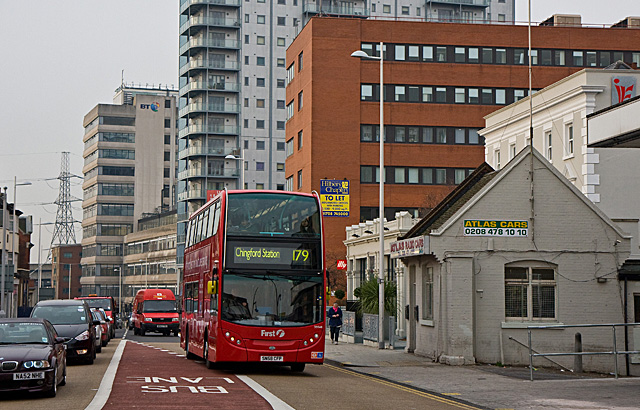
- From top to bottom: Redbridge Town Hall on Ilford High Road; Ilford Hill

- Location within Greater London
- Population: 168,168 (2011 Census)
- OS grid reference: TQ445865
  - Charing Cross: 9.0 mi (14.5 km) WSW
- London borough: Redbridge
- Ceremonial county: Greater London
- Region: London
- Country: England
- Sovereign state: United Kingdom
- Post town: ILFORD
- Postcode district: IG1-IG6
- Dialling code: 020
- Police: Metropolitan
- Fire: London
- Ambulance: London
- UK Parliament: Ilford North; Ilford South
- London Assembly: Havering and Redbridge

Ilford is a large town in East London, England, 9 miles (14 km) northeast of Charing Cross. Part of the London Borough of Redbridge, Ilford is within the ceremonial county of Greater London. It had a population of 168,168 in 2011, compared to 303,858 for the entire borough.

Identified as a metropolitan centre in the London Plan, Ilford's commercial and retail centre is surrounded by extensive residential development. The town is on the transport corridor between London and coastal Essex, with both the A12 and the central railway station linking the regions. In recent years, as a result of increased levels of immigration, Ilford has become one of the most multicultural towns in England.

Historically a small rural settlement in the ancient parish of Barking in the Becontree hundred of the historic county of Essex, its strategic position on the River Roding and the London to Colchester road made it a coaching town. The arrival of the railway in 1839 accelerated its growth, leading to the area becoming part of the conurbation with London. It split from the parish of Barking in 1888, and, in the 20th century, Ilford significantly expanded and increased in population, becoming a municipal borough in 1926. In 1965, it merged with Wanstead and Woodford, also incorporating parts of neighbouring districts, to form the London Borough of Redbridge, part of Greater London.

== Origins and administration ==
=== Toponymy ===
Ilford was historically known as Great Ilford to differentiate it from nearby Little Ilford. The name is first recorded in the Domesday Book of 1086 as Ilefort and means "ford over the Hyle". "Hyle" is an old Celtic name for the River Roding that means "trickling stream". Great and Little Ilford share the place name origin, but the Domesday reference is to the Little Ilford area.

Great and Little Ilford appear to have always been distinct areas separated by the Roding. The place names of Great and Little Ilford both appear to derive from the ford (and river), rather than deriving from the subdivision of a larger Ilford area.

=== Manor of Barking ===
Barking was a huge manor (landholding), first mentioned in a charter in 735 AD. The manor covered the areas now known as Barking, Dagenham and Ilford. The manor was held by the nunnery of Barking Abbey.

=== Ancient Parish of Barking ===
By the late 1100s (the parishes of England were, with a few exceptions, fixed for around 700 years from the late 12th century onwards) the huge manor of Barking was served by two ancient parishes, Barking (including Ilford) and Dagenham. This reversed the usual situation (for smaller, and even quite large manors) where a parish would serve one or more manors. As with other manors, the area held by the declined over time, but the parish boundaries based on its former extent remained constant.

A map showing the wards of Barking Parish in 1871. The Ancient Parish covered both Barking and Ilford.

The Parish of Barking, in the Becontree hundred of Essex, covered the areas now known as Barking and Ilford. Barking was a large ancient parish of 12,307 acres (49.80 km^{2}) in the Becontree hundred of Essex. It was divided into the wards of Chadwell, Great Ilford, Ripple and Town.

=== Ilford separates from Barking ===
The Barking parish authorities gradually lost responsibility for a variety of functions during the 19th century; from 1836, for the administration of poor relief, Ilford came within the Romford Poor Law Union and in 1840 the Metropolitan Police District was extended to cover the area. In 1875, the Romford rural sanitary district was created, covering a wide area including Ilford.

In 1888, Ilford and the neighbouring ward of Chadwell to its east were split from Barking and together formed a separate Ilford civil parish. In 1890, a local board of health was set up for the parish, replacing the rural sanitary authority, and in 1894 a reform of local government reconstituted it as an urban district. It formed part of the London Traffic Area from 1924 and the London Passenger Transport Area from 1933. It was incorporated as the Municipal Borough of Ilford in 1926.

The suburban expansion of London caused a significant increase in population and the borough became one of the largest in England not to gain county borough status.

=== London Borough of Redbridge ===
In 1965, the municipal borough was abolished and its former area was combined with that of Wanstead and Woodford, the northern extremity of Dagenham and a small part Chigwell Urban District (around Hainault), to form the new London Borough of Redbridge.

=== Representation ===
Two the UK Parliamentary constituencies are named after Ilford: Ilford North and Ilford South.The Member of Parliament (MP) for Ilford North is Wes Streeting of the Labour Party, who succeeded the previous MP Lee Scott of the Conservative Party in the 2015 general election. The MP for Ilford South from 2024 is Jas Athwal of the Labour Party. Redbridge forms part of the Havering and Redbridge London Assembly constituency.

== History ==
=== Prehistoric natural history ===
Cast of the mammoth skull found in Ilford

The only complete skull of a mammoth discovered in the United Kingdom was unearthed in 1864 close to where Uphall Road is today. The skull can now be seen in the Natural History Museum and a cast of the skull and other prehistoric animal remains can be seen at Redbridge Museum, Central Library, Ilford.

=== Iron Age ===
Redevelopment has destroyed much of the evidence for early Ilford, but the oldest evidence for human occupation is the first- and second-century BC Iron Age earthwork known as Uphall Camp. This was situated between the Roding and Ilford Lane and is recorded in 18th-century plans. Roman finds have also been made in the vicinity.

=== Lavender Mount ===
A nearby mound called Lavender Mount existed into the 1960s, when it was removed during building work at Howards chemical works. Excavation has shown that Lavender Mount may have been a 16th-century 'beacon-mound'. Archaeological discoveries are displayed at Redbridge Museum.

=== Economic development ===
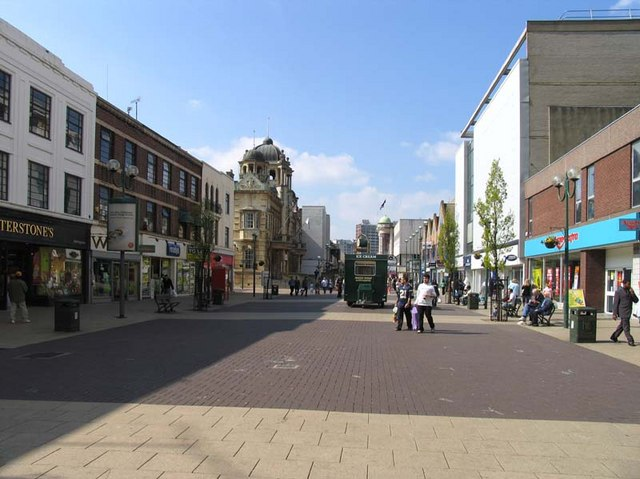
High Road Ilford with Waterstones bookshop in the foreground on the left and the town hall in the background

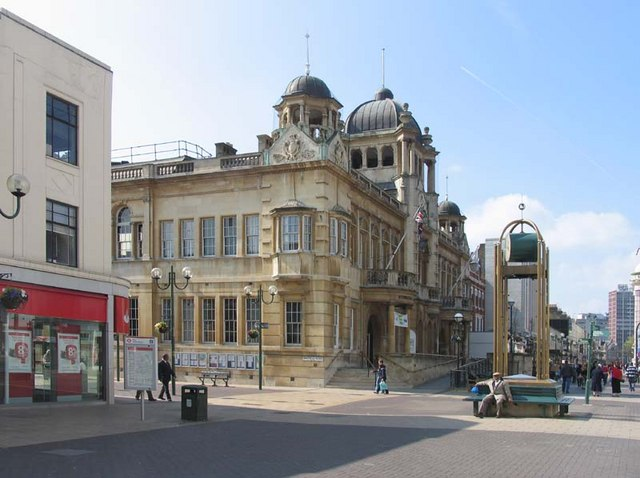
Redbridge Town Hall, High Road, Ilford

Ilford straddled the important road from London to Colchester. The Middlesex and Essex Turnpike Trust controlled and maintained the road from 1721. The River Roding was made navigable for barges as far as Ilford Bridge from 1737. Ilford remained largely rural until its expansion in the 19th century. This brought about brickworks, cement works and coal yards to service the new buildings, largely centred on the River Roding. In 1839, a railway station was opened on the line from Romford to Mile End. The early businesses gave way to new industries, such as paper making and services such as steam laundries and collar making, to provide for the new commuting class created by the railway.

A number of major businesses have been founded in the town, including the eponymous photographic film and chemicals manufacturer Ilford Photo. This was founded in 1879 by Alfred H. Harman, a photographer from Peckham, who established the business in a house in Cranbrook Road making gelatino-bromide 'dry' plates. The business soon outgrew these premises, and its headquarters moved to a site at Roden Street until 1976 when the factory was closed. Many Ilford Limited products are displayed at Redbridge Museum.

The radio, electronics and telecommunications company Plessey, founded in 1917 in Marylebone, moved to Cottenham Road in Ilford early in 1919 and then to Vicarage Lane where it became one of the largest manufacturers in its field. During World War II, the factory was heavily damaged by bombing and the company carried out much of its manufacture, with 2,000 workers servicing a production line, located in the underground railway tunnel between Wanstead and Gants Hill. In 1955 the company employed 15,000 workers, in sites throughout Ilford and neighbouring areas, with an extensive research department. BAL-AMi Jukeboxes were manufactured at 290–296 High Road, Ilford, during the 1950s, which also served as the headquarters of the Balfour (Marine) Engineering company. The Exchange is the main shopping centre.

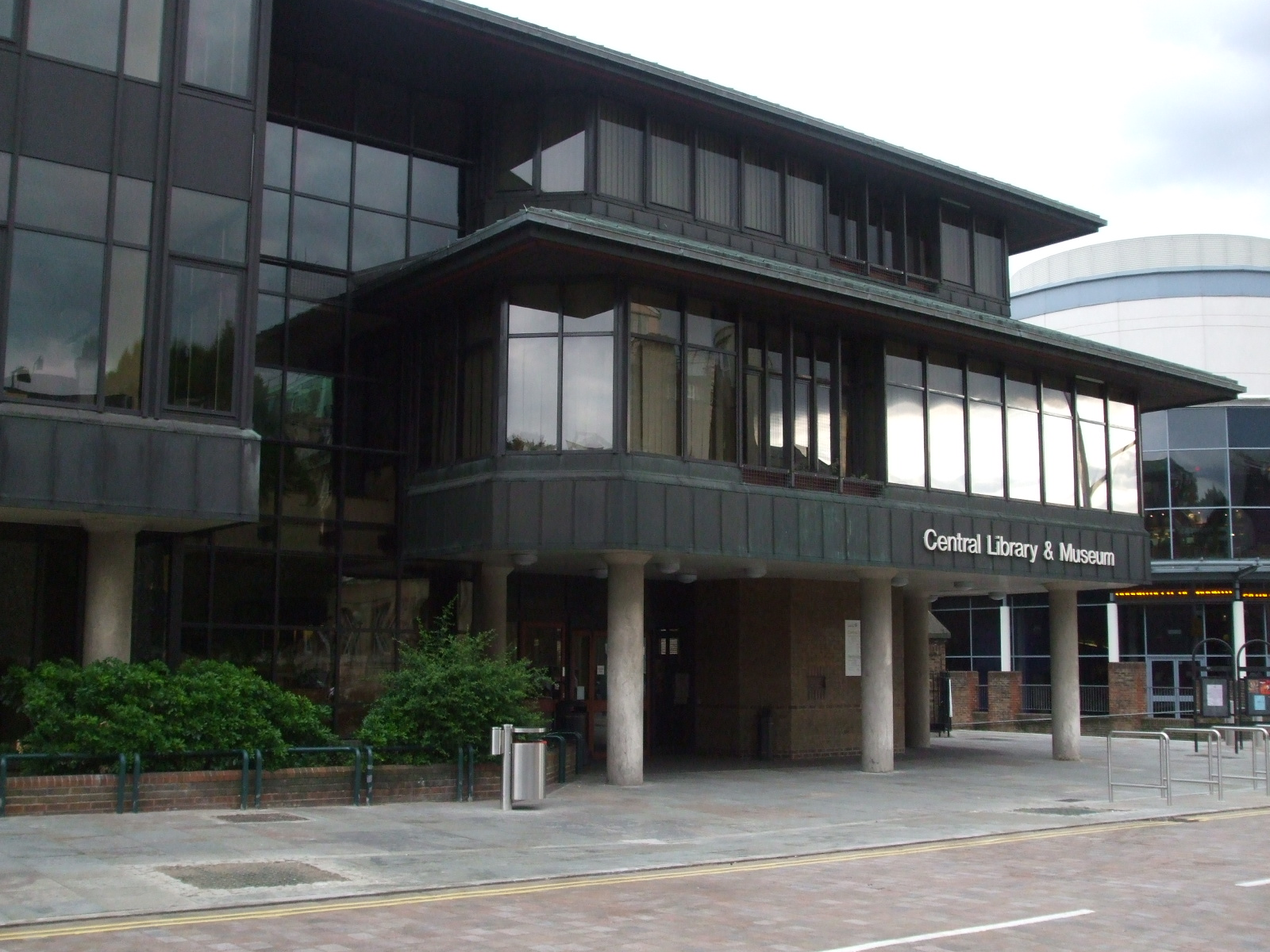
Central Library and Museum, Clements Road, Ilford

=== Suburban expansion ===
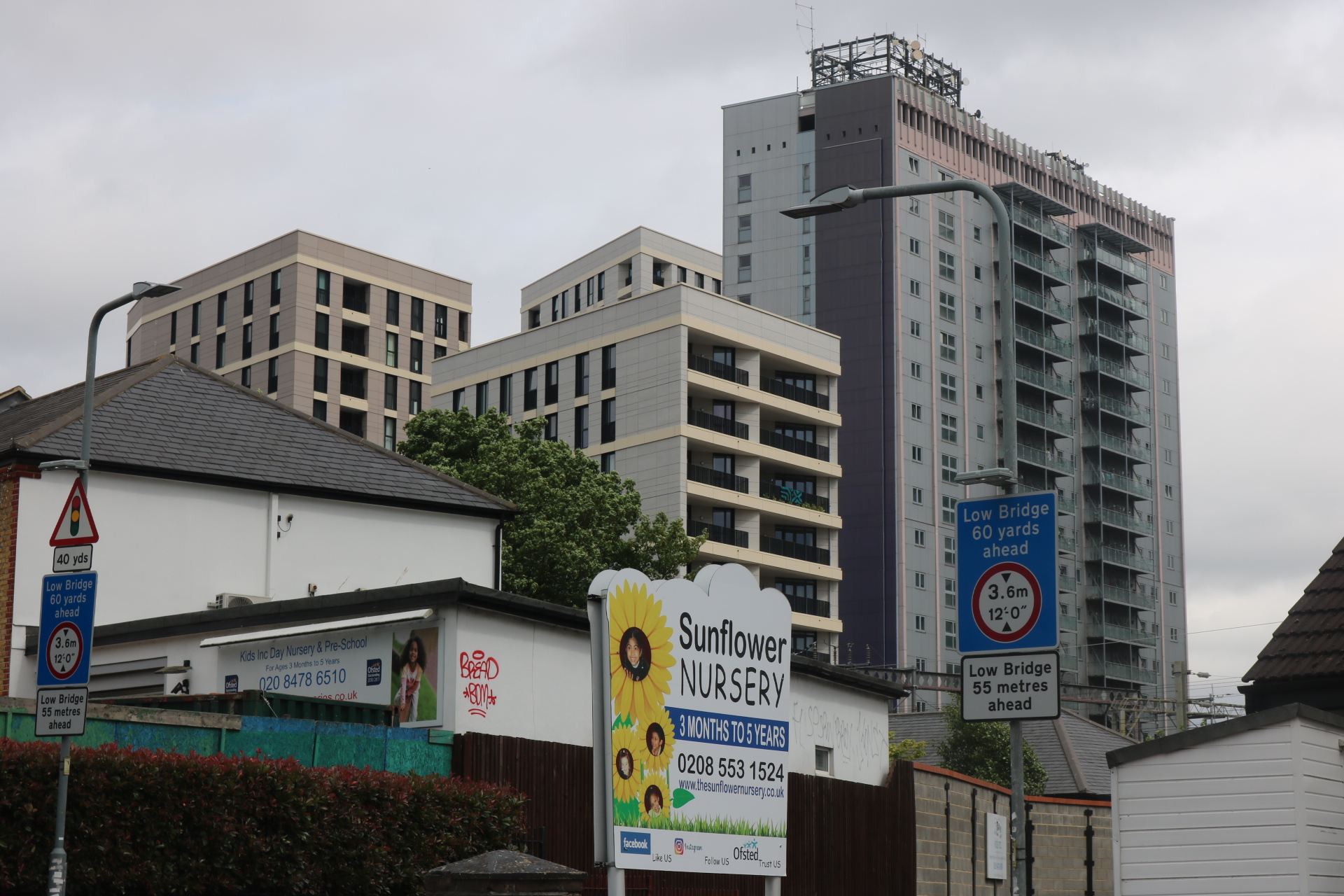
High buildings in central Ilford

By 1653, Ilford was a compact village of 50 houses, mostly sited north and south of the current Broadway and the area was distinctly rural. In 1801 the population of Ilford was 1,724 and by 1841 it had grown to 3,742. It had a population of 41,244 in 1901 and occupied an area of 8,496 acres (34 km^{2}). 2,500 houses of the vast Becontree Estate, built by the London County Council from 1921, were within the boundaries of Ilford; the addition caused a rise in population of 11,600 by 1926.

The Central line service of the London Underground to new and former main-line stations in the area began in 1947 and the population of the Municipal Borough of Ilford peaked in 1951 at 184,706, declining to 178,024 in 1961 before being absorbed into Redbridge and Greater London in 1965. At the 2001 Census the combined populations of the Ilford North and Ilford South constituencies was 196,414.

=== Notable events ===
John Logie Baird, who invented the television, moved to Ilford in the mid to late 1920s to work on his new invention. He worked in a workshop on the roof of the Plessey premises in Ley Street, which has long since been demolished to make way for new housing.

In 1922, Ilford became notorious for being the site of the Thompson-Bywaters case, a cause célèbre in the United Kingdom that later influenced the debate around capital punishment in the UK.

Ilford was also the birthplace of the actor Maggie Smith who left for Oxford at the age of four.

During World War II an Ilford man lost his life when his Royal Air Force training aircraft crashed in the United States. Local residents living near the site, in the State of Oklahoma, erected a monument in 2000 honouring the lives of all four RAF fliers who perished. The event was attended by the Mayor of Redbridge and his mace-bearer, to much local acclaim. The residents, who include Choctaw Indians and the Choctaw Nation government, continue honouring the lives of all four on each anniversary of the crashes, which took place in February 1943.

=== Olympics ===
Its proximity to the Olympic Park in Stratford meant that in 2011, Ilford was the fastest-growing tourist destination in Europe due to the London 2012 Summer Olympics.

== Economy ==
In 2005, Ilford was ranked sixth in the Retail Footprint ranking for Greater London, behind London's West End, Croydon, Kingston upon Thames, Bromley and Brent Cross Shopping Centre. It ranked just above Romford and central London's Kensington. As of 2020, Ilford has 145,860 square metres (1,570,000 sq ft) of total town centre floorspace, the tenth highest in Greater London and noticeably lower compared to Stratford and Romford.

== Geography ==
The town is bounded in the west by the North Circular Road, Manor Park and the River Roding, with Chadwell Heath and Romford to the east and Barking to the South. The Alders Brook is a tributary of the Roding that marks the boundary between Newham and Redbridge. Climate data for Ilford is taken from the nearest weather station at Greenwich, around 6 miles (9.7 km) south south west of the railway station:

Climate data for Greenwich Park, elevation: 47 m (154 ft), 1991–2020 normals, extremes 1948–2004
Month	Jan	Feb	Mar	Apr	May	Jun	Jul	Aug	Sep	Oct	Nov	Dec	Year
Record high °C (°F)	16.8 (62.2)	19.7 (67.5)	23.3 (73.9)	25.3 (77.5)	29.0 (84.2)	34.5 (94.1)	35.3 (95.5)	37.5 (99.5)	30.2 (86.4)	26.1 (79.0)	18.9 (66.0)	16.4 (61.5)	37.5 (99.5)
Mean daily maximum °C (°F)	8.5 (47.3)	9.2 (48.6)	12.1 (53.8)	15.4 (59.7)	18.6 (65.5)	21.4 (70.5)	23.8 (74.8)	23.3 (73.9)	20.3 (68.5)	15.8 (60.4)	11.6 (52.9)	8.9 (48.0)	15.8 (60.4)
Daily mean °C (°F)	5.9 (42.6)	6.2 (43.2)	8.4 (47.1)	10.7 (51.3)	13.8 (56.8)	16.7 (62.1)	18.8 (65.8)	18.7 (65.7)	15.9 (60.6)	12.4 (54.3)	8.8 (47.8)	6.3 (43.3)	11.9 (53.4)
Mean daily minimum °C (°F)	3.4 (38.1)	3.2 (37.8)	4.7 (40.5)	6.0 (42.8)	9.1 (48.4)	12.0 (53.6)	13.9 (57.0)	14.1 (57.4)	11.6 (52.9)	9.0 (48.2)	6.1 (43.0)	3.8 (38.8)	8.1 (46.6)
Record low °C (°F)	−12.7 (9.1)	−9.4 (15.1)	−6.7 (19.9)	−4.8 (23.4)	−1.0 (30.2)	1.1 (34.0)	5.0 (41.0)	5.3 (41.5)	1.1 (34.0)	−2.1 (28.2)	−8.0 (17.6)	−10.5 (13.1)	−12.7 (9.1)
Average precipitation mm (inches)	43.9 (1.73)	39.9 (1.57)	36.5 (1.44)	38.6 (1.52)	44.0 (1.73)	49.3 (1.94)	36.3 (1.43)	53.0 (2.09)	52.4 (2.06)	58.3 (2.30)	59.9 (2.36)	50.7 (2.00)	562.9 (22.16)
Average precipitation days (≥ 1.0 mm)	10.5	9.2	7.9	8.1	7.9	7.8	7.1	8.2	7.9	10.3	10.6	10.2	105.6
Mean monthly sunshine hours	44.4	66.1	109.7	152.9	198.7	198.6	209.2	198.0	140.6	99.7	58.5	50.1	1,526.4
Source 1: Met Office
Source 2: Starlings Roost Weather

== Demography ==
=== Historic population statistics ===
Ilford (parish) population
1891	10,913
1901	41,234
1911	78,188
1921	85,194
1931	131,061
1941	#
1951	184,706
1961	178,024
# no census was held due to war
source: UK census

=== Population ===
The entire town of Ilford is also made up of its neighbourhoods Aldborough Hatch, Barkingside, Clayhall, Cranbrook, Fairlop, Fullwell Cross, Loxford, Gants Hill, Goodmayes, Newbury Park, Redbridge, Hainault, Little Heath and Seven Kings. It approximates to 11 electoral wards, and the total population counted 168,168 people in the 2011 census, compared to 303,858 for the borough of Redbridge as a whole.

=== Ethnicity ===
Ilford has a very large ethnic-minority population, and is one of the most diverse towns in the country.

Ilford North had the fourth-highest Jewish proportion of residents in the 2001 census. The Hindu, Muslim and Sikh population number some 30,000. The large South Asian community in Ilford speak a variety of languages, including Bengali, Gujarati, Hindi, Punjabi, Tamil, Telugu and Urdu.

According to the 2001 census, the parliamentary constituencies of Ilford North and Ilford South consisted of the following demographs:

	Ilford North	Ilford South
Total Population	89,806	106,608
White	75.6%	45.1%
Black	5.2%	11.4%
Asian	15.5%	39.3%
Mixed	2.2%	2.8%
Other	1.5%	1.4%

	Ilford North	Ilford South
Christian	55.1%	42.5%
Hindu	6.7%	10.5%
Jewish	10.3%	7.9%
Muslim	6.4%	19.6%
Sikh	2.7%	9.4%

At the 2011 census, the Clementswood ward's population with a BAME (Black, Asian and minority ethnic) background was 84.2%, one of the highest in Greater London. Most of Ilford's other wards have figures above 70%. The lowest BAME ward in Ilford was Fairlop, 34.9%.

=== Housing ===
House prices in Ilford are generally far lower than the average for Greater London. The median house price in 2014 in Ilford's Loxford ward was £193,000, which was the sixth lowest out of the 628 wards of Greater London.

In most wards, a majority of houses are owned by the households. The exceptions are in Clementswood, Loxford, and Valentines.

The table below shows housing type data for Ilford's wards at the 2011 census (but altered to match new ward boundaries in 2015).

2011 Census homes %
Ward	Detached	Semi-detached	Terraced	Flats and apartments
Aldborough	4.9%	25.1%	43.5%	26.6%
Barkingside	4.2%	31.5%	40.2%	24.1%
Clayhall	7.2%	48.7%	30.4%	13.6%
Clementswood	7.7%	12.4%	45.0%	34.9%
Cranbrook	3.5%	27.8%	39.7%	28.9%
Fairlop	7.4%	28.8%	37.7%	26.2%
Fullwell	7.6%	43.7%	21.9%	26.8%
Goodmayes	6.3%	22.1%	42.2%	29.3%
Loxford	2.9%	12.2%	42.8%	36.0%
Mayfield	10.8%	26.6%	47.3%	15.3%
Newbury	4.5%	17.8%	48.2%	29.3%
Seven Kings	6.1%	20.4%	42.9%	30.5%
Valentines	4.7%	13.1%	31.6%	50.5%

=== Other ===
The male life expectancy was 76.4 years in Loxford, and 84.5 years in Barkingside. The female expectancy was highest in Barkingside, 87.5 years, and lowest in Loxford, 81.7 years.

== Transport ==
=== Rail and tube ===
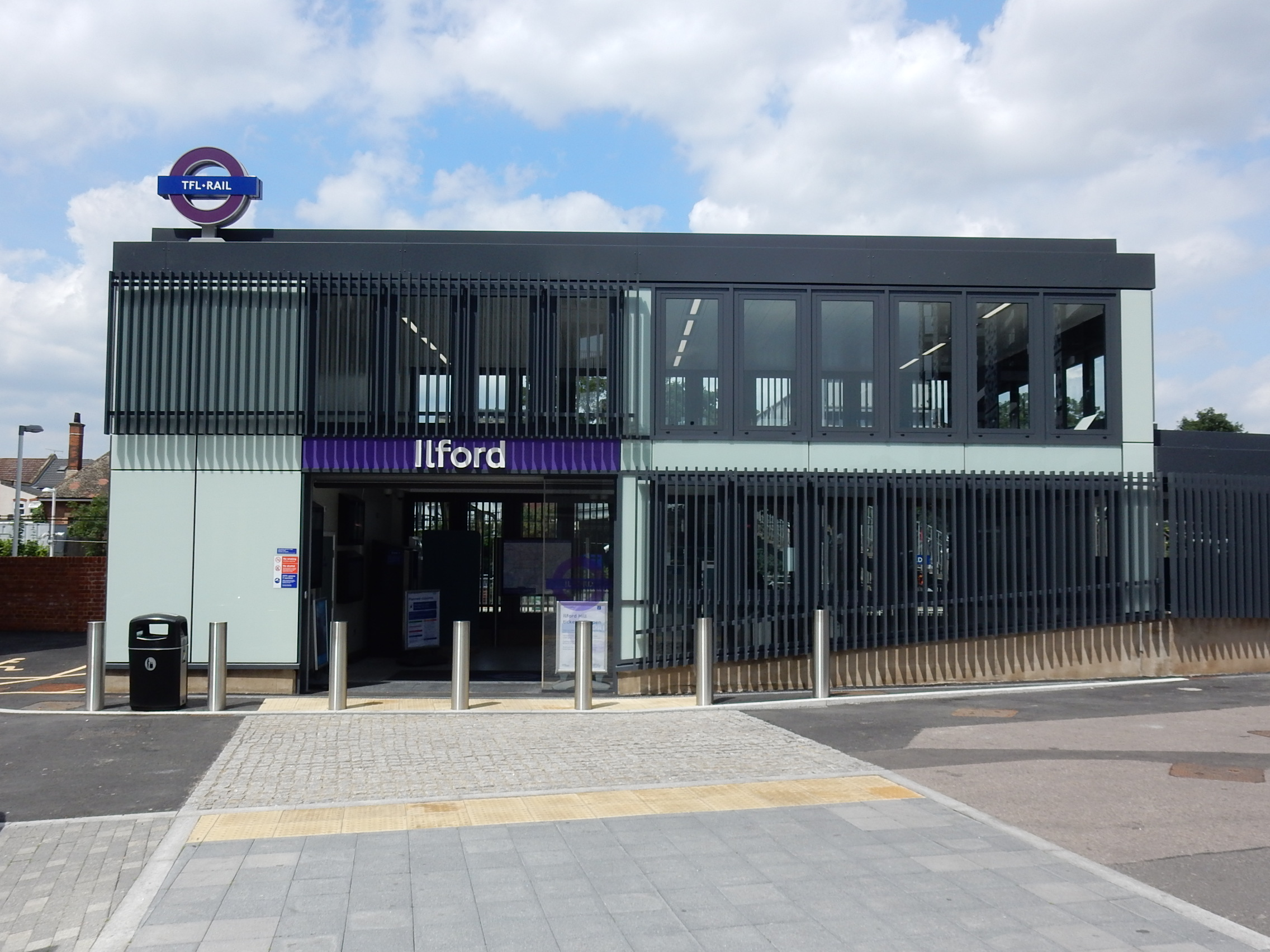
Ilford railway station

Ilford station is in London fare zone 4.

Ilford railway station is on the Great Eastern Main Line. It is served by Elizabeth line trains which also call at the nearby Seven Kings and Goodmayes stations.

The station was the scene of two fatal rail crashes in 1915 and 1944. A traction maintenance depot for electric multiple units is situated in Ilford, which maintains many National Rail and London Overground trains.

London Underground's Central line is to the north of Ilford, with Redbridge, Gants Hill, Newbury Park, Barkingside and Fairlop nearby. The stations are on the Hainault loop branch of the Central line, with direct connections to Stratford, the City, the West End and West London.

=== Buses ===
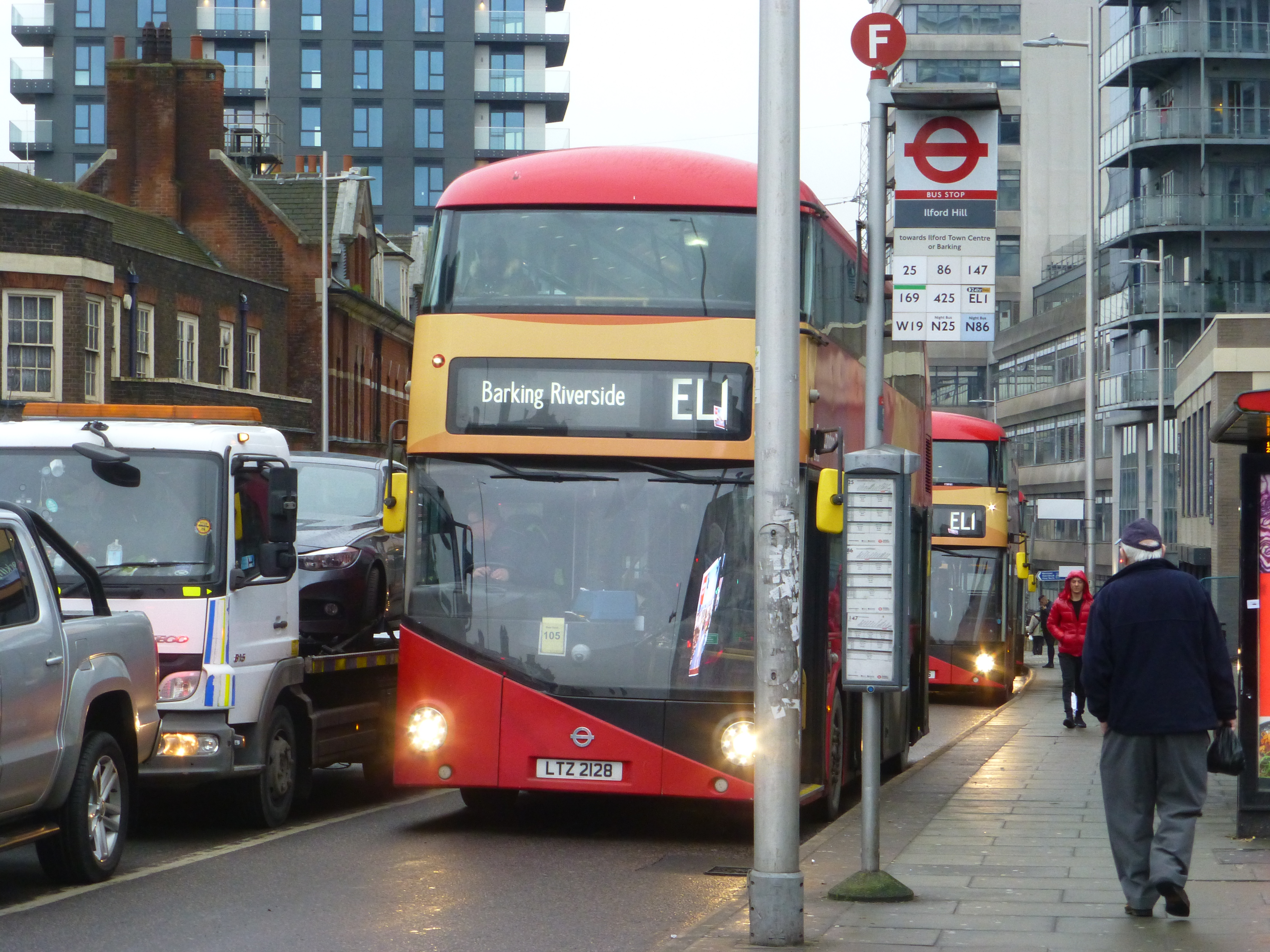
A New Routemaster on an EL1 service in Ilford

London Buses link Ilford to other districts in east and central London.

Routes include 25, 86, 123, 128, 145, 147, 150, 167, 169, 179, 296, 364, 366, 396, 425, 462, SL2 and W19. Night buses N25 and N86 additionally serve the town overnight.

East London Transit route EL1 begins in Ilford; it links up with routes EL2 and EL3 at Barking, with onward connections to Chadwell Heath, Becontree and Dagenham.

=== Road ===
Ilford is a primary route destination in east London, and main roads link the town to key destinations throughout the capital and the East of England.

The A118 runs east-west through Ilford, linking the town with Stratford and the A11 westbound, and Romford eastbound. The A123 runs north-south through the town, with direct connections to Gants Hill and Chigwell northbound, and Barking southbound.

The A406 North Circular Road links the town directly with north and west London destinations, such as Wood Green and Brent Cross. It carries traffic northbound to the M11 for Stansted Airport and Cambridge. Southbound, the route runs to Beckton, the Woolwich Ferry, and the A13 for Isle of Dogs, Dagenham and Tilbury.

North of Ilford, the A12 links the town directly to the M25, Chelmsford and Ipswich. Southbound traffic runs past Stratford, through the Blackwall Tunnel and onto the A2 for Dartford and destinations in Kent.

=== Cycle ===
There is an intermittent cycle lane between Stratford, Ilford, Romford and Harold Wood along the A118. The lane is part of the former London Cycle Network, as signposted route number 12.

At Stratford, Cycle Superhighway 2 begins and runs through Mile End and Whitechapel to the City. The route is mostly segregated from other road traffic.

Cycleway 16 passes to the north of Ilford, providing a direct cycle connection between the Queen Elizabeth Olympic Park at Stratford and Barkingside.

The Roding Valley Way is a shared-use route running alongside the River Roding. It begins in Ilford and runs unbroken to Roding Valley tube station near Buckhurst Hill, Essex.

== Landmarks ==
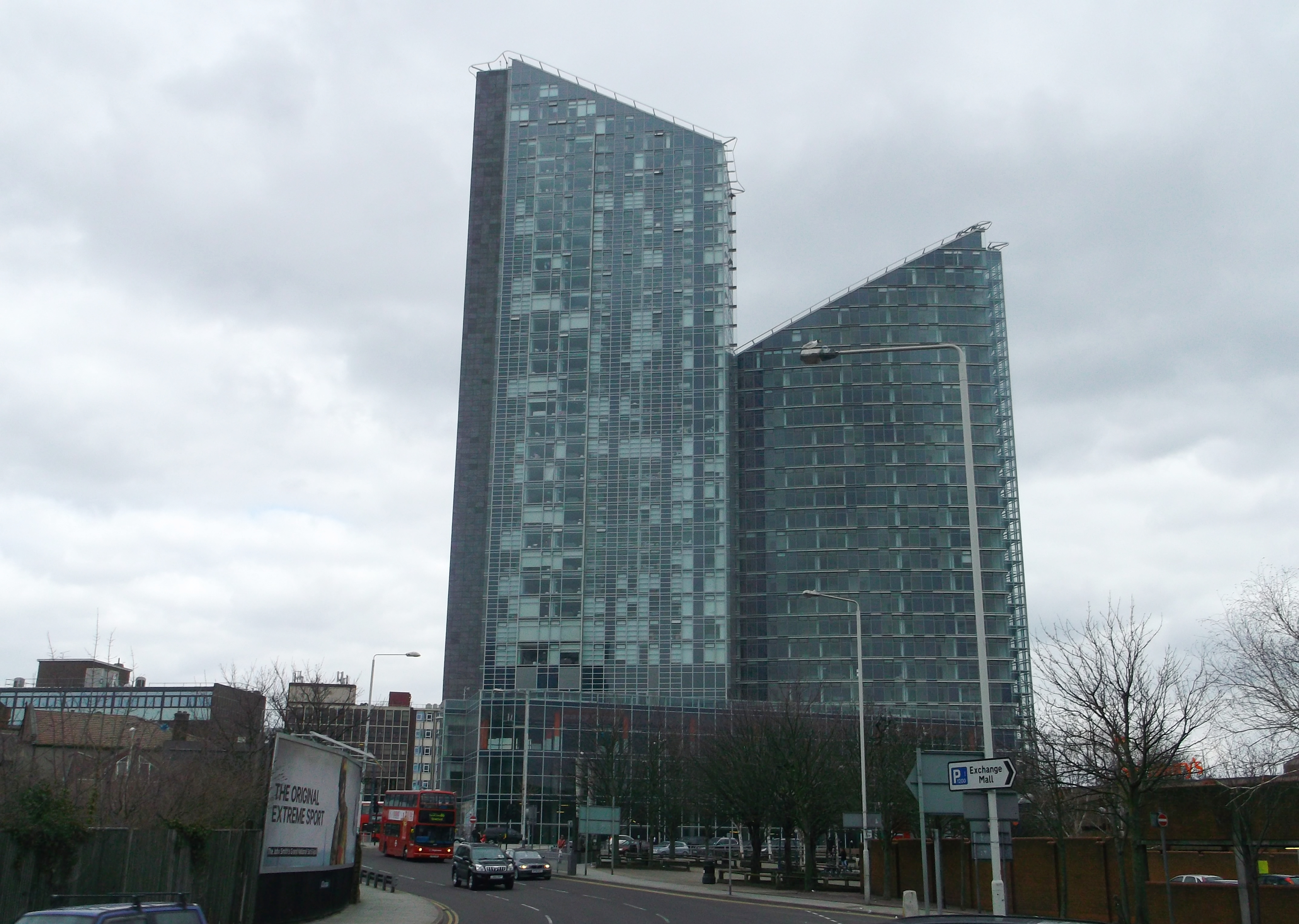
Pioneer Point

Valentines Mansion was built in 1696 and was used as council offices until 1994. It gives its name to Valentines Park, the largest green space in the borough.

Pioneer Point consists of two buildings: Pioneer Point North is 105 m tall with 33 floors and Pioneer Point South is 82 m tall with 25 floors.

Raphael House is 99m tall and Lynton House is 93m tall; they were completed in 1969.

== Religious buildings ==
St Mary's Church is the original parish church, but for much of the 20th century St Clement's Church was the main Anglican church until it was demolished in 1977. St Alban's Church is a redbrick Neo-Gothic building on Albert Road. Ilford Hospital Chapel is the oldest building in Redbridge, dating back to c. 1140. St Luke's Church is occupied by the Mar Thoma Syrian Church.

Another building in Illford is St. Augustine's Catholic Church. There are also a number of Muslim, Hindu and Sikh buildings.

Ilford Islamic Centre is a purpose built Mosque on Albert Road completed in 1997.

== Education ==
Loxford School in Loxford has over 3000 students from 11 to 18, Seven Kings School is half that size. The Palmer Catholic Academy is a Catholic secondary school and Ursuline Academy Ilford is a Catholic school for girls. Cranbrook School was an independent school that closed in 2016. Valentines High School is another secondary school in Ilford closer to Gants Hill Station. Uphall Primary School is in Loxford near the North Circular.

== Culture ==
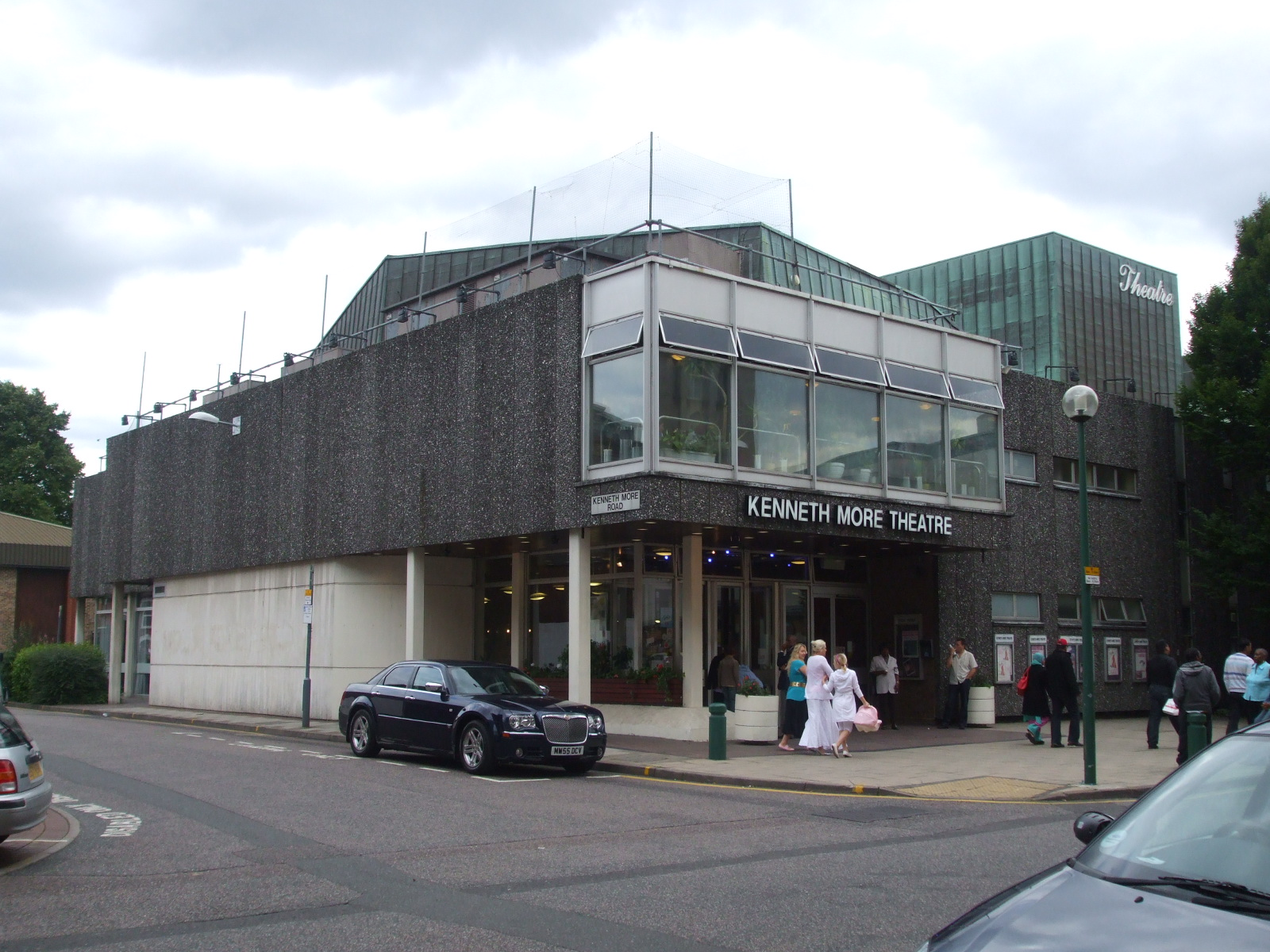
Ilford Kenneth More Theatre

=== Art, theatre and media ===
The local newspaper, covering the town and the borough, is the Ilford Recorder.

The poets Kathleen Raine (1908–2003) and Denise Levertov (1923–1997) were both born and spent their early years in Ilford. Levertov's Russian father, born a Hassidic Jew but converted to Christianity as a student, settled in Ilford as an Anglican minister. There is a tablet memorialising Levertov's father in Ilford's Hospital Chapel. Whilst Levertov wrote lyrically about Ilford, and in particular Valentines Park, in later life, Raine described it as a "suburban Hades".

The Kenneth More Theatre was officially opened in January 1975. It places emphasis on serving the local community, and stages a mix of professional and amateur productions. Its programme is varied, and runs throughout the year with productions generally changing on a weekly basis. It is well known within the local area for its annual pantomime, which normally runs from mid-December to mid-January.

St. Alban's Singers is a mixed voice choir for men and women based in St. Alban's Church in Albert Road, Ilford. The choir meets to rehearse at the church each Tuesday evening during term-time and aims to give three concerts per year.

Space Gallery Ilford opened in 2019.

Kathy Kirby was born in Ilford.

Dame Maggie Smith Actress was born in Ilford.

Louise Lombard Actress lived in Barkingside, Ilford in childhood. Attended St. Augustine's Primary School.

Tamzin Outhwaite Actress lived in Redbridge, Ilford in childhood. Attended St. Augustine's Primary School.

William Morris 1834-1896. Socialist, Interior Designer, Artist, Poet, Craftsman. Lived at 18 Coventry Road, Ilford briefly in 1848.

John Logie Baird 1888-1946. A Scottish inventor who pioneered television technology. Lived at 32 Coventry Road

Anna Karen of On the Buses fame lived at 131 Windsor Road, Illford.

=== Sport ===
An unspecified venue in Ilford was used for a cricket match in August 1737 between Essex and London. It is the earliest known organised match definitely played in Essex.

Ilford Cricket Club plays home games at Valentines Park. This ground was opened in 1897. It was used regularly by Essex County Cricket Club, but inadequate maintenance meant that the county stopped playing there after 2001.

Two Non-League football clubs play at the Cricklefield Stadium, Ilford F.C. of the Essex Senior League and Barkingside F.C. of the Eastern Counties League Division One South. Waltham Forest F.C. (now Walthamstow F.C.) played at the Cricklefield from 2008 to 2013.

South Park is one of the largest open spaces in the London Borough of Redbridge and has been awarded Green Flag status. The Redbridge Parks Police patrolled the parks until they were disbanded in 2011.

Nigel Benn a World Champion boxer was born in Ilford.

== Notable people ==
- Eva Hart (1905-1996), one of the last passengers to remember the sinking of the Titanic

== See also ==
- List of people from Redbridge
- List of schools in Redbridge
- Ilford pet cemetery is also the final resting place for Simon, able sea cat, only cat to earn the PDSA Dickens medal.

== Bibliography ==
- Buckley, G. B. (1935). Fresh Light on 18th Century Cricket. Cotterell.
- Ian Dowling Valentines Park, Ilford: A Century of History (1999) OCLC 43337735
- J E Oxley Barking and Ilford: An Extract from the Victoria History of the County of Essex vol 5 (1987)
- James Thorne (1876), "Great Ilford", Handbook to the Environs of London, London: John Murray, hdl:2027/mdp.39015063815669
- Edward Walford (1883), "Ilford", Greater London, London: Cassell & Co., OCLC 3009761
