= BAL-AMi Jukeboxes =

Series of jukeboxes

BAL-AMi Jukeboxes were manufactured in the UK from 1953 to 1962, by the Balfour (Marine) Engineering Company, mostly being derivatives of those made by the American AMi (Automatic Musical Instrument) jukebox company.

== History ==
In the years following World War II, import restrictions were in place in the UK thus preventing many types of goods from being sold unless they had a certain percentage of locally manufactured content. One such example was the record playing jukebox, which were almost exclusively made in the United States at that time.

In order for any of these jukeboxes to be allowed to be sold in the UK, at least 53% of their content had to be manufactured locally. Recognising an opportunity, a London-based businessman, Sam Norman, engaged with John Haddock of the AMi jukebox corporation. An agreement was reached in 1953 for Norman's company, Balfour (Marine) Engineering, to manufacture AMi jukeboxes at the Balfour factory in Ilford, Essex, under licence from AMi.

During the following ten years Balfour produced jukeboxes which were mostly identical to their AMi counterparts, aside from their internal electrical systems and amplifiers. The electrics were to UK specifications, and the amplifiers were generally provided by Beam-Echo. From 1955 onwards, these jukeboxes were distributed under the name of BAL-AMi.

To address the needs of some smaller venues such as coffee bars, BAL-AMi also manufactured some machines unique to the UK and holding just twenty records (giving forty selections allowing for two sides per disc).

== Models ==
Model	Year of Introduction	Notes
D and E	1953	Badged as AMi with some UK made parts
F	1954	Mostly badged as AMi
G	1955	First jukeboxes with the BAL-AMi badge
Junior	1956	First jukebox unique to BAL-AMi, made for smaller locations
Super 40	1957	Designed and manufactured exclusively by BAL-AMi for smaller coffee bar locations
I	1958	Mostly the I200M (manual select) variant
Super 40 Deluxe	1959	Designed and manufactured exclusively by BAL-AMi for smaller coffee bar locations
J	1959	Identical to USA AMi model J with UK-spec electrics and amplifier
K	1960	Identical to USA AMi model K with UK-spec electrics and amplifier
Super 100	1960	Designed and manufactured exclusively by BAL-AMi using some parts from the AMi model H
New Yorker	1962	Designed and manufactured exclusively by BAL-AMi using some parts from the AMi model K

== End of Jukebox Production ==
Sam Norman died of leukaemia in 1962, at the age of 47. BAL-AMi made their final model, the New Yorker, that same year. The Balfour company continued operations in other areas such as aircraft parts for the rest of the 1960s.
