= Stephen Gray (cricketer) =

English cricketer (born 1988)

Personal information
- Full name: Stephen Kevin Gray
- Born: 6 July 1988 (age 38); Barking, Essex, England
- Batting: Right-handed
- Role: Wicket-keeper

Domestic team information
- Years: Team
- 2007–2014: Norfolk
- 2008–2010: Cambridge UCCE/MCCU

Career statistics
Competition	First-class
Matches	8
Runs scored	190
Batting average	21.11
100s/50s	–/–
Top score	35*
Catches/stumpings	12/1
- Source: Cricinfo, 13 July 2019

Stephen Kevin Gray (born 6 July 1988) is an English former first-class cricketer.

Gray was born at Barking and was educated at Canon Palmer School, before going up to Anglia Ruskin University. While studying at Anglia Ruskin, he made his debut in first-class cricket for Cambridge UCCE against Somerset at Fenner's in 2008. He played first-class cricket for Cambridge UCCE (later MCCU) until 2010, making eight appearances. He scored 190 runs in his eight matches, at an average of 21.11 and a high score of 35 not out. In addition to playing first-class cricket, Gray also played minor counties cricket for Norfolk from 2007–14, making 23 appearances in the Minor Counties Championship and 29 appearances in the MCCA Knockout Trophy.
