= St Mary's Church, Ilford =

- St Mary's Church, Great Ilford
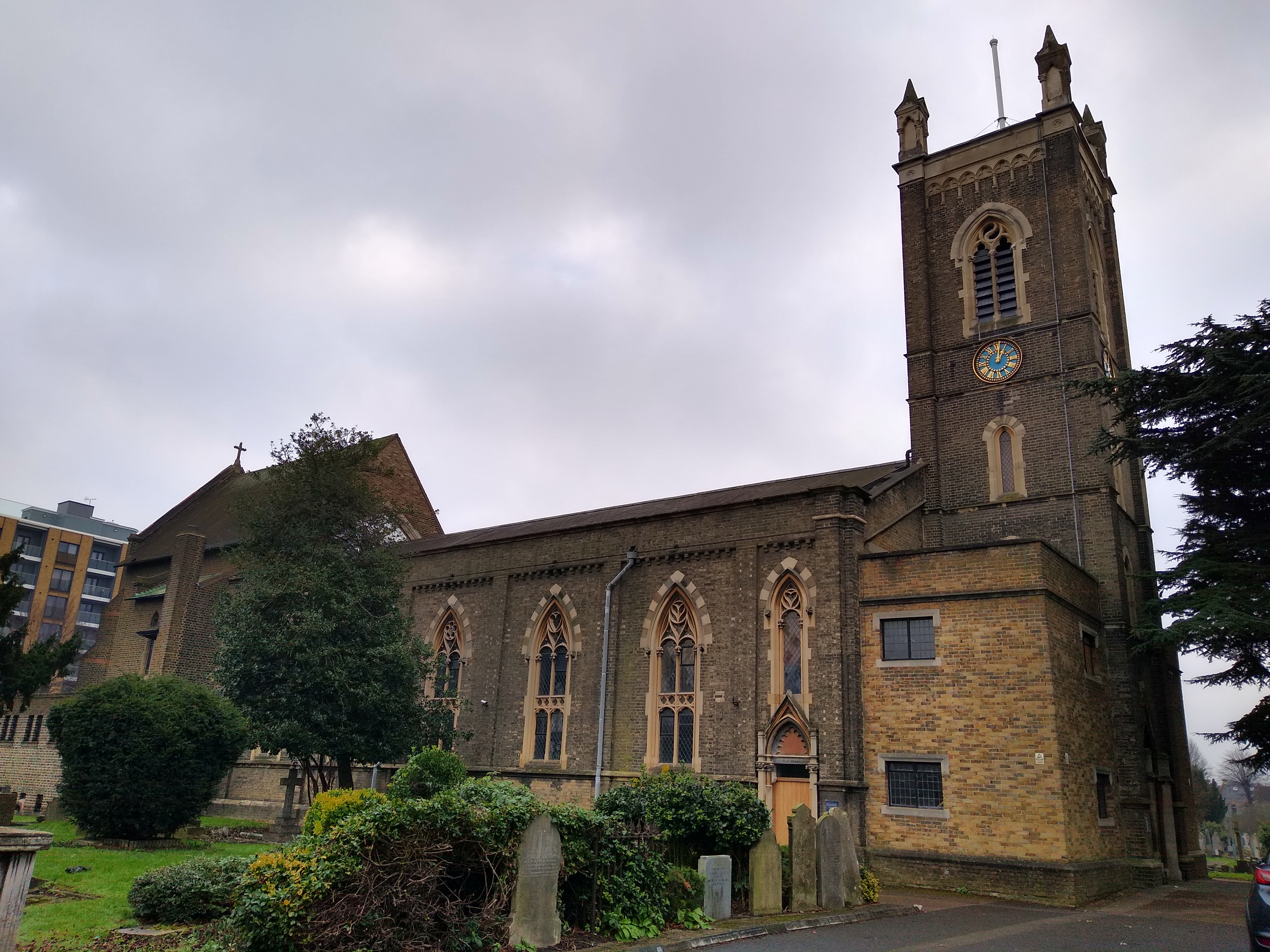
- St Mary's Church, Ilford
- 51.5616°N 0.088°E
- Country: England
- Denomination: Church of England
- Churchmanship: Anglo-Catholic
- Website: stmarysilford.org.uk

History
- Consecrated: 1831

Administration
- Diocese: Diocese of Chelmsford
- Archdeaconry: Archdeaconry of West Ham

Clergy
- Vicar: Fr Gareth Jones

St Mary's Church, Ilford or St Mary's Church, Great Ilford is a Church of England parish church in Ilford, located in the London Borough of Redbridge.

== History ==
A new ecclesiastical parish for Great Ilford was split off from that of Barking in 1830 and its church building completed the following year. The church's principal benefactor was Robert Westley Hall-Dare, M.P. His daughter, Mary Hall-Dare (d. April 1908), laid the foundation stone and the church was opened on June 9, 1831, by Charles James Blomfield, Bishop of London, “and the day was spent in general festivity from the highest to the lowest classes”. Its first vicar was appointed in 1837 - its advowson was initially vested in All Souls College, Oxford. A tower was added in 1866 and a chancel, lady chapel and vestries in 1920. St Clement's Church was completed as a chapel of ease for it in 1896, before becoming the parish's main church in 1902.

A complete set of fourteen "Stations of the Cross" was painted for the Revd. Hubert Valentine Eardley-Wilmot in 1916 by the artist Edward Arthur Fellowes Prynne. One of the stations was dedicated to the Vicar's younger brother, Gerald Eardley-Wilmot, who died of wounds fighting in France that year. Three years later, in 1919, Prynne also painted three altar panels for the Church.

== Gallery ==
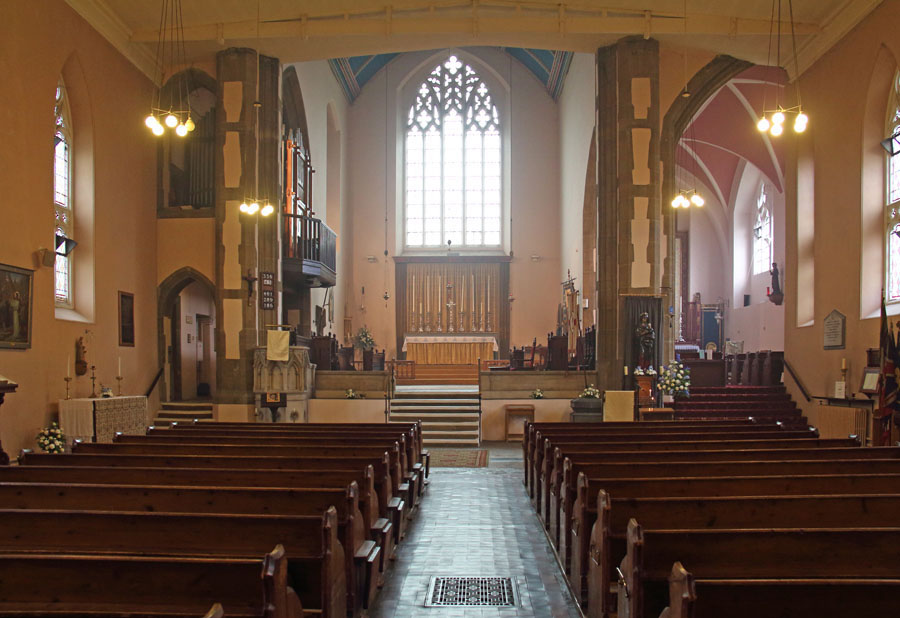
Interior of St Mary's Church, Ilford

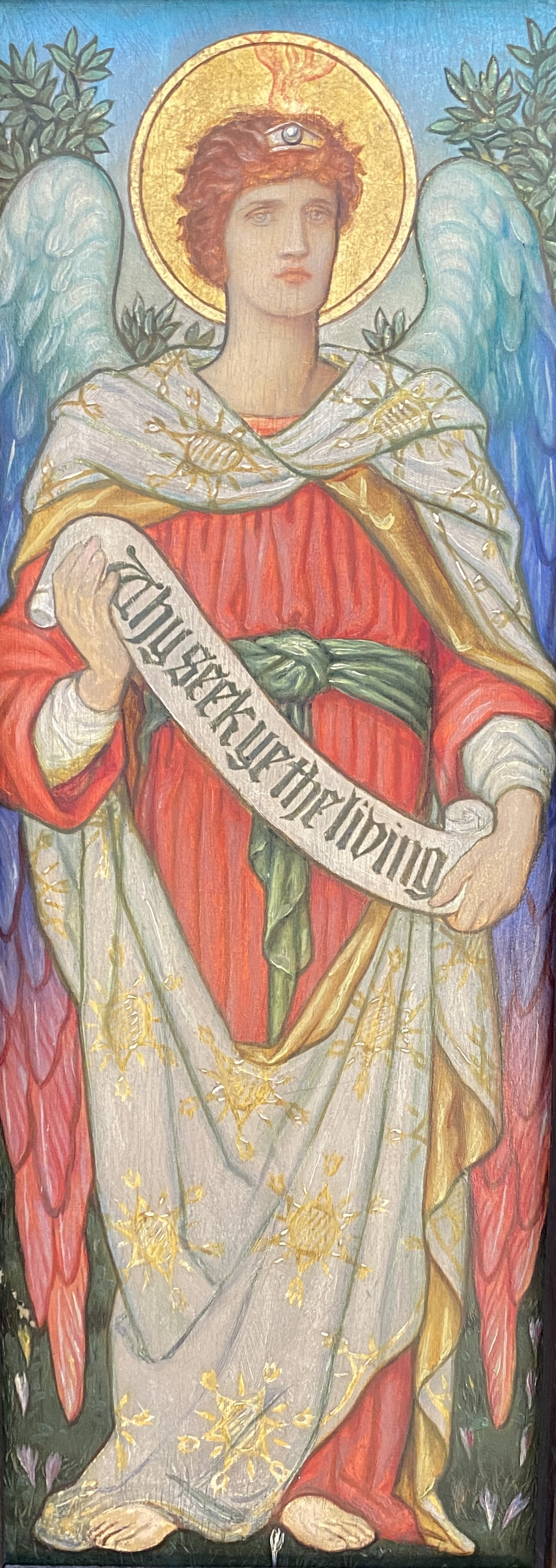
Edward Arthur Fellowes Prynne's painted angel altar panel

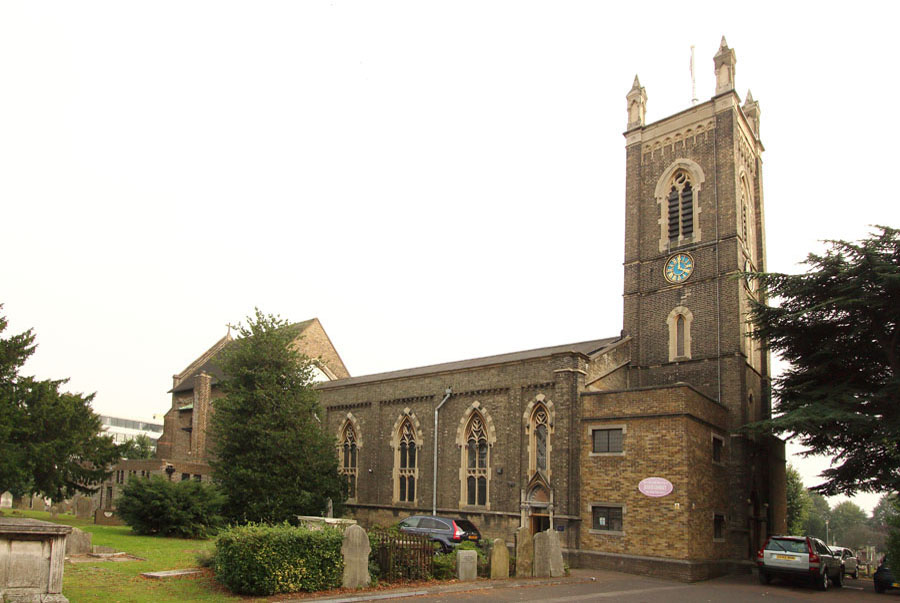
North side of St Mary's Church

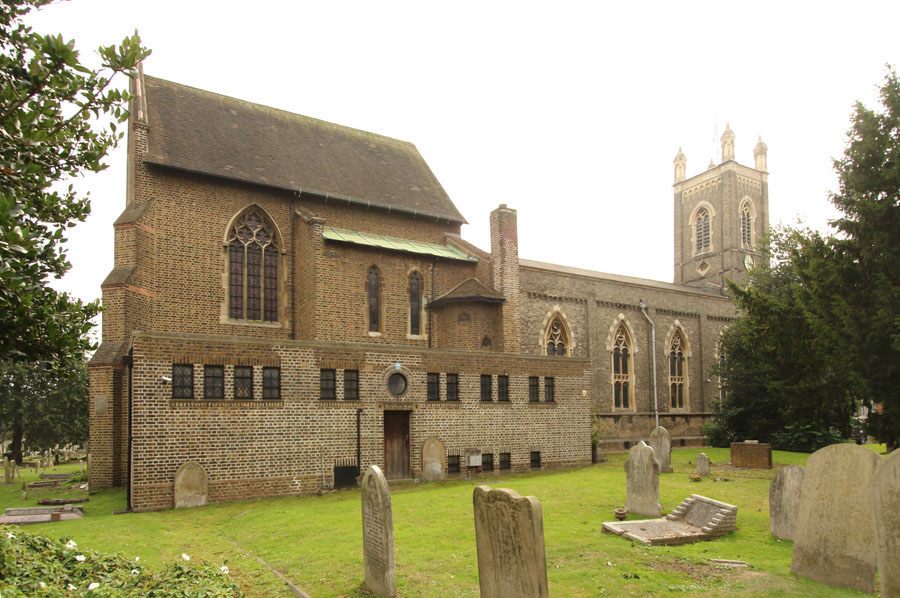
South side of St Mary's Church
