= Little Heath, London =

Coordinates: 51.584323°N 0.117610°E

Little Heath
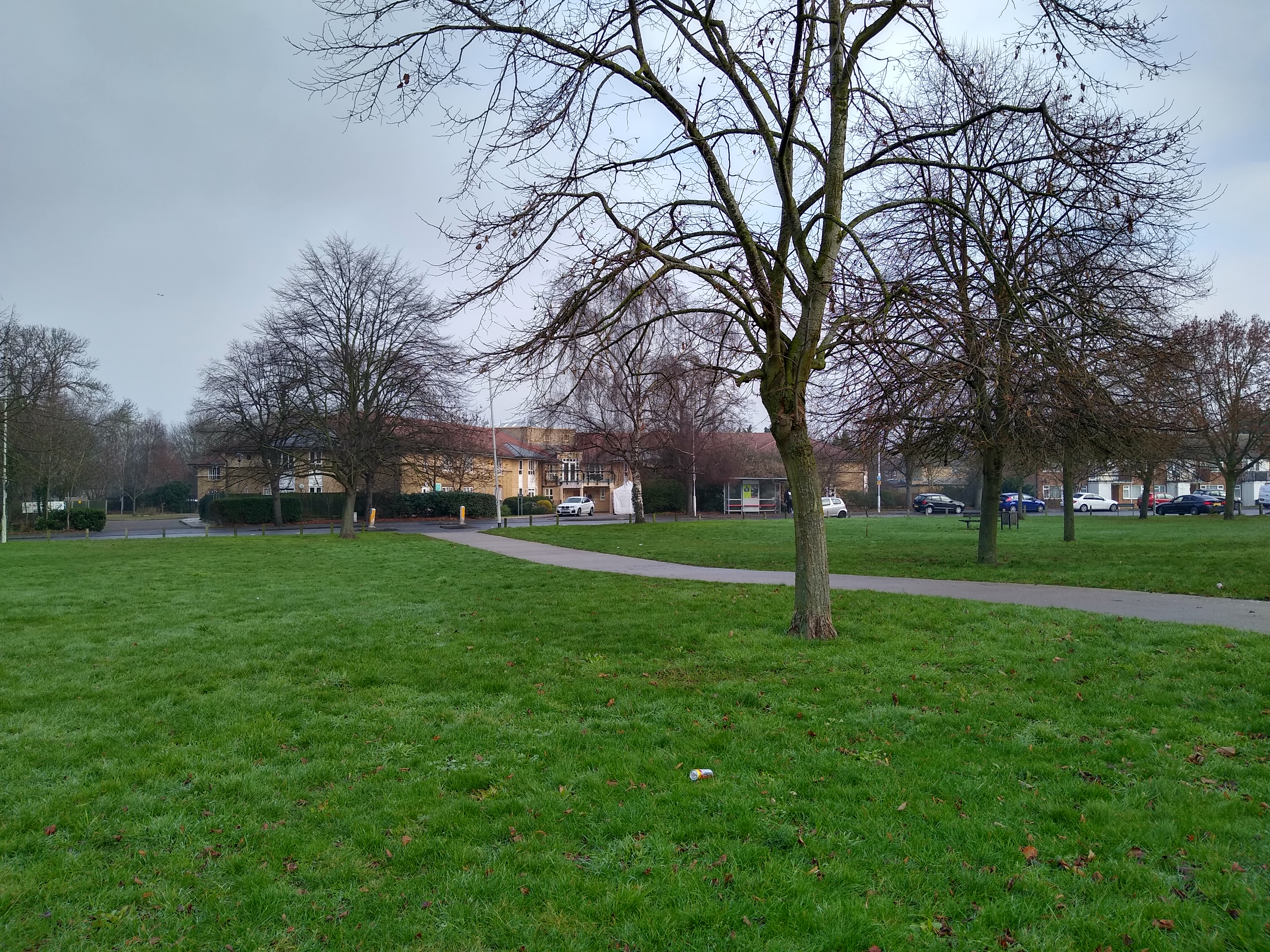

- Location within Greater London
- London borough: Redbridge
- Ceremonial county: Greater London
- Region: London
- Country: England
- Sovereign state: United Kingdom
- Post town: ROMFORD
- Postcode district: RM6
- Dialling code: 020
- Police: Metropolitan
- Fire: London
- Ambulance: London
- London Assembly: Havering and Redbridge

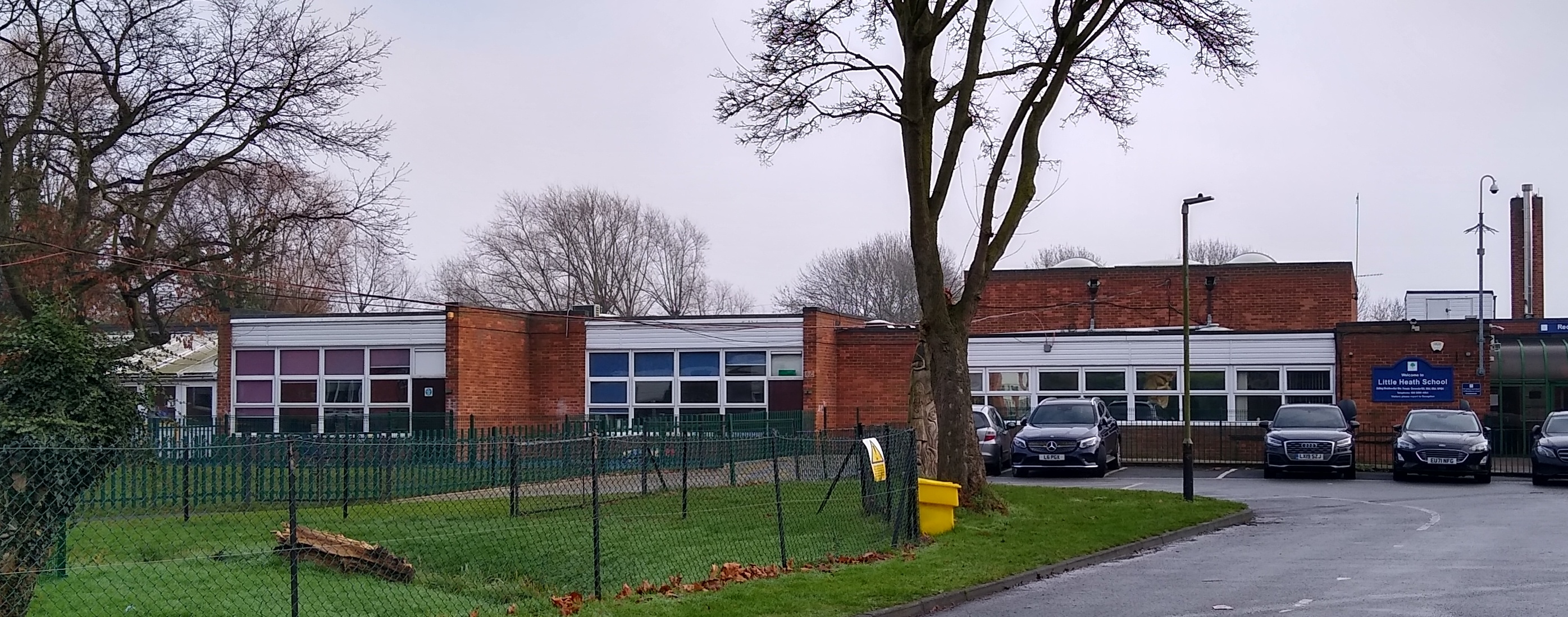
Little Heath School

Little Heath is a locality in the London Borough of Redbridge. To the east is Chadwell Heath in the London Borough of Barking and Dagenham, after which it was modelled. The postcode for the area is RM6. Little Heath School is based in the area. East London Transit route EL3 terminates at Little Heath.

== History ==
=== Toponymy ===
The name is recorded in 1369 as Lytel Ylleford heth, meaning 'little Ilford heath'. It had become shortened to Litelheth by 1456. It is formed from the Middle English words litel and hethe.
