= Ursuline Academy Ilford =

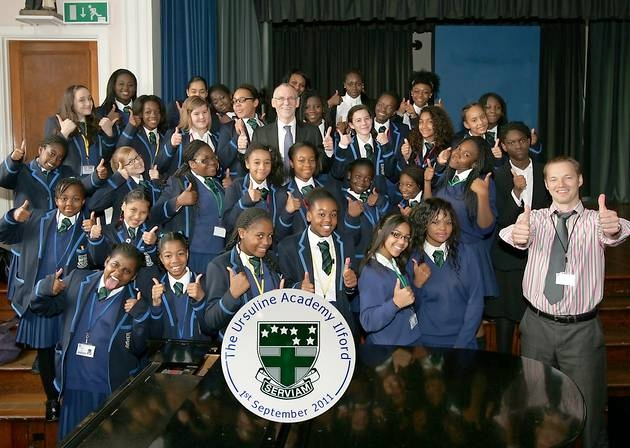
- Ursuline celebrates academy status

Location
- Morland Road; Ilford, Greater London, IG1 4JU; England; 51°33′45″N 0°04′10″E

Information
- Type: Academy
- Religious affiliation: Roman Catholic
- Established: 1903; 123 years ago
- Department for Education URN: 137418 Tables
- Ofsted: Reports
- Head teacher: Fiona A Stone
- Gender: Girls
- Age: 11 to 18
- Enrolment: 974 (January 2015)
- Website: www.uai.org.uk

Ursuline Academy Ilford is a Roman Catholic secondary school and sixth form for girls in Ilford, London, England.

The school was established by the Ursulines as Ilford Ursuline High School in 1903. It converted to academy status in 2011 and is administered by the Roman Catholic Diocese of Brentwood.

== Notable former pupils ==
- Eileen Ash (née Whelan), Test cricketer
- Celia Green, philosopher and author.
- Kathy Kirby singer.
- Charlotte Lamb author.
