= Uphall Primary School =

Location
- Uphall Road; Ilford; London, IG1 2JD; England
- Coordinates: 51.54752°N 0.07225°E

Information
- Type: Community school
- Local authority: Redbridge
- Department for Education URN: 102819 Tables
- Ofsted: Reports
- Gender: Co-educational
- Age: 3 to 11
- Website: uphallprimary.co.uk

Uphall Primary School is a primary school in the London Borough of Redbridge whose former domestic science block is grade II listed by Historic England.

== Organisation ==
The school has five classes in each year group from Reception to Year 6. It also has two nursery classes. The school follows the National Curriculum for all year groups.
