= St Clement's Church, Ilford =

England in Ilford, London, England

Coordinates: 51.56465°N 0.06984°E

St Clement's Church, Ilford was a Church of England church on Park Avenue in Ilford in the London Borough of Redbridge. It was built between 1889 and 1896. The land for the building was donated by Mrs Clement Ingleby of Valentines and the building designed by Cutts Brothers. Initially a chapel of ease to St Mary's Church, Ilford, it replaced it as the parish's main church in 1902. Its vicar was appointed by All Souls College, Oxford. It was demolished in 1977.

For four and a half years from 1912, the church's curate was William Henry Jackson, who went on to be a missionary in Burma (now Myanmar) and invented Burmese Braille.
