= The Palmer Catholic Academy =

Coordinates: 51°33′54″N 0°05′33″E

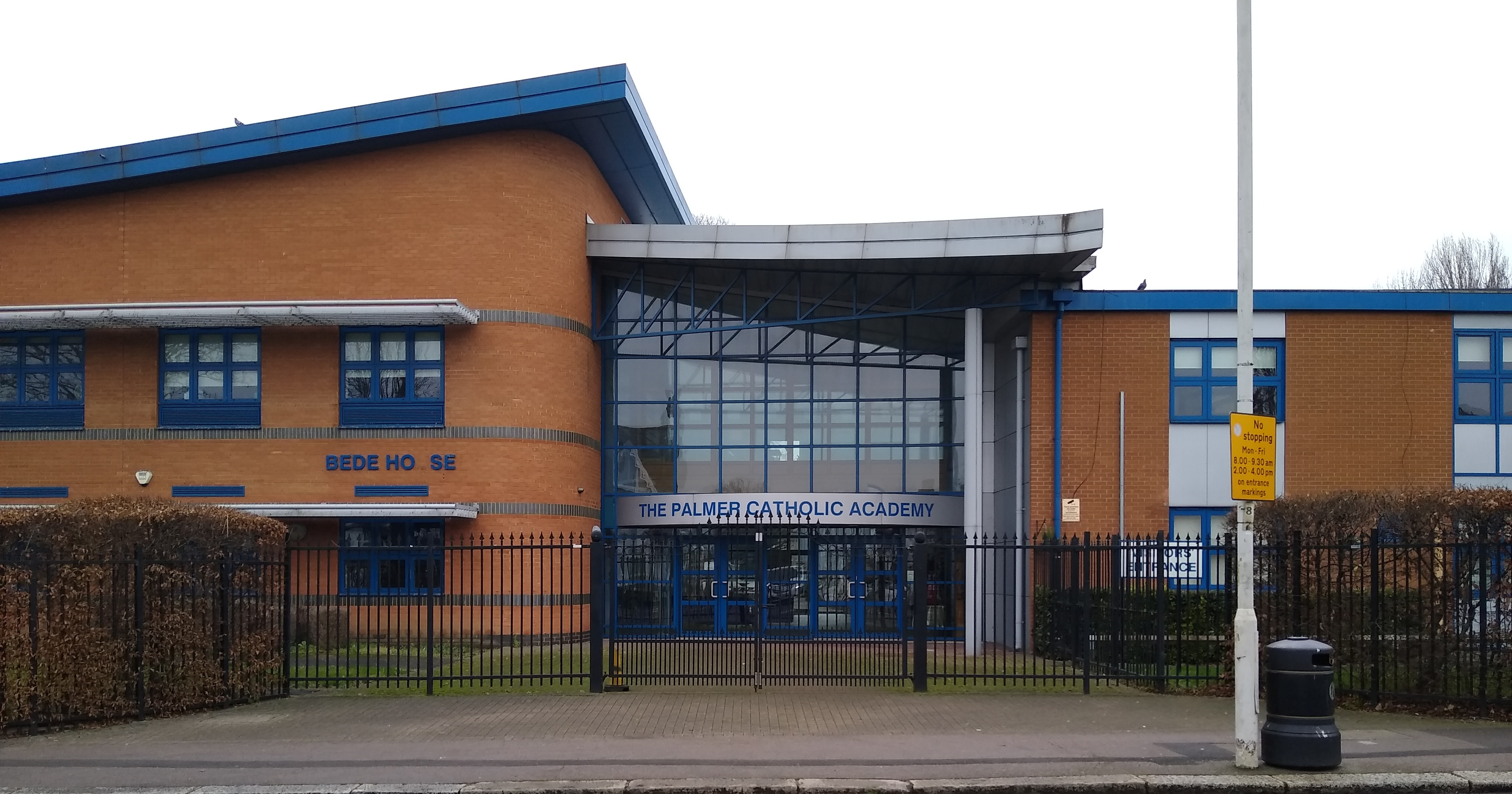

Location
- Aldborough Road South; Ilford, London, IG3 8EU; England

Information
- Type: Academy
- Motto: Latin: Ad Gloriam Dei Et Servitium Omnium
- Religious affiliation: Roman Catholic
- Established: 1961
- Department for Education URN: 137088 Tables
- Ofsted: Reports
- Headteacher: Paul Downey
- Gender: Coeducational
- Age: 11 to 18
- Houses: Palmer House, Kolbe House, Heenan House, Mother Teresa House, Bede House
- Colours: Navy; Red; Gold
- Former pupils: Old Palmerians
- Website: http://tpc.academy/

The Palmer Catholic Academy (TPCA), previously known as Canon Palmer Catholic School, is a Roman Catholic secondary Academy school in Ilford, located in the London Borough of Redbridge, England that was the first of its type in the area.

The school consists of 5 buildings, each named after a notable Catholic figure. Palmer House, named after the school's founder, Canon Patrick Palmer; Heenan House; Kolbe House, named after Maximilian Kolbe; Mother Teresa House; and Bede House. The school is a specialist science mathematics and computing college. The school became an Academy and changed its name to "The Palmer Catholic Academy".

The Palmer Catholic Academy is an independent voluntarily funded academy for boys and girls from 11 to 18. Founded as Canon Palmer Catholic School in 1961 with 300 students, it has grown greatly in numbers and stature now having over 1200 pupils as of 2019. The Palmer Catholic Academy also has a sixth form. It has had numerous headteachers over the course of its life, including Allison Moise Dixon the first female headteacher. Its current headteacher is Paul Downey.

The school predominantly promotes Catholic/Christian values but welcomes students of all faiths.

The school is a physical education, Drama, and maths specialist school. It has gained regional sporting achievements. In 2006, more than 60% of its pupils gained 5+ GCSEs.

== Notable pupils ==
- Stephen Gray (born 1988), cricketer
- Robert Gilchrist (born 1990), basketballer
- Shea Lolin Musician, (born 1983)
- Folarin Balogun footballer, (born 2001)
