= Ilford Hospital Chapel =

Hospital chapel in Ilford, London, England

Coordinates: 51.5579°N 0.0689°E

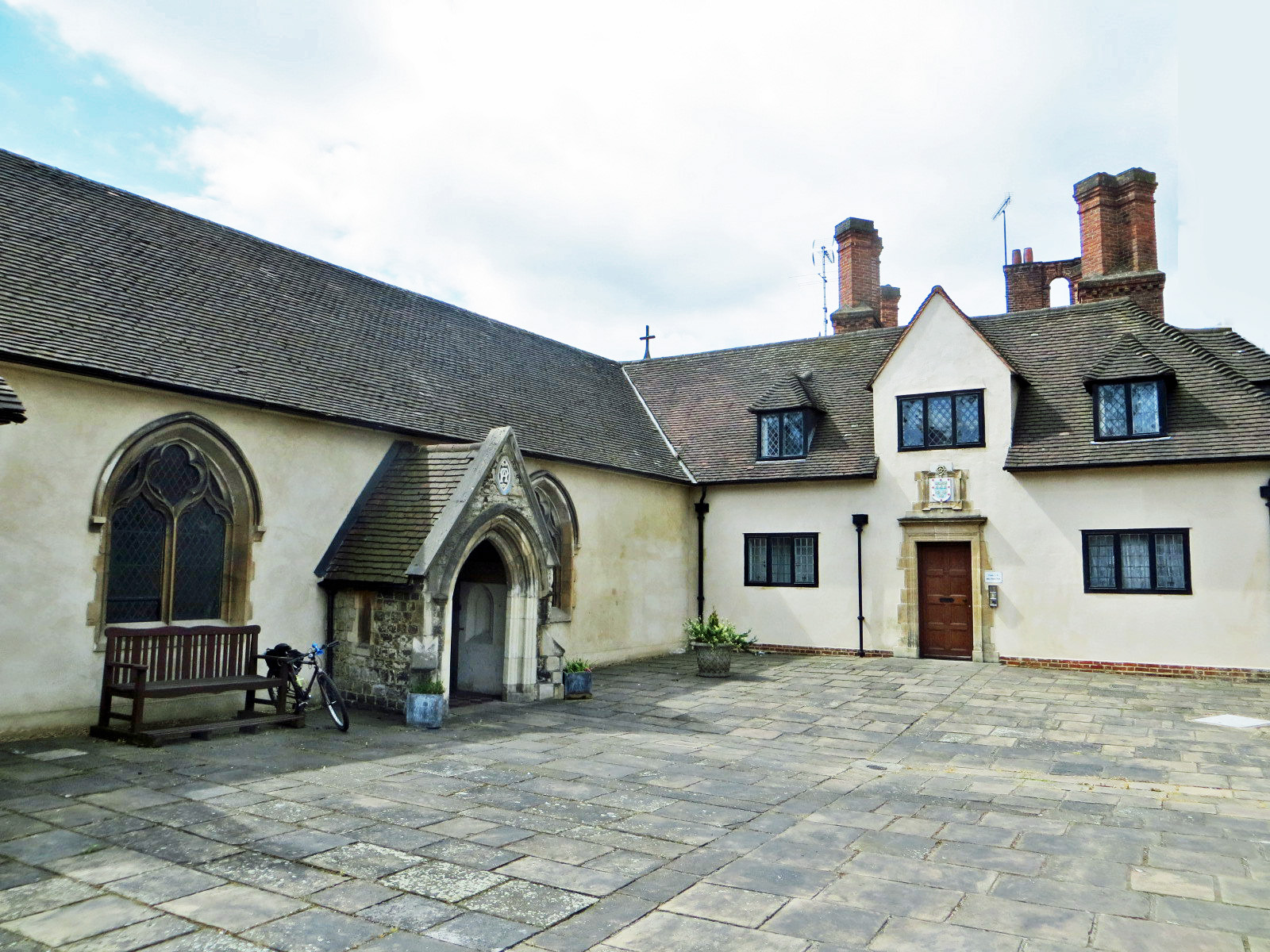
Exterior from north

The Hospital Chapel of St Mary the Virgin and St Thomas of Canterbury, Ilford, also known as Ilford Hospital Chapel, is on Ilford Hill in Ilford. It is an ancient charitable foundation dating from about 1130, and is the oldest building in the London Borough of Redbridge. Since 1954 it has been protected as a Grade II* listed building under UK legislation.

== History ==
The hospital was built on the south side of Ilford Hill on land owned by the Benedictine Abbey of Barking. It was founded in the reign of King Stephen, by the Abbess Adelicia (or Adeliza), as a hospice for thirteen residents. Historians differ on whether the hospital was for old and infirm men or for lepers. Adelicia endowed the foundation generously, with 120 acres of assart land in Estholt, two hides of land in Upminster and Aveley, a mill in Ilford, half the income of the parish church at Barking, and the tithe of all her mills in the parish. The hospital was governed by a Prior, a Master or Warden, and there were two chaplains.

In 1173 Mary Becket was appointed Abbess. She was the sister of Thomas Becket, and under her abbacy the chapel was enlarged and the name of her murdered brother was added to its title. The Abbey of Barking was dissolved by Henry VIII in 1539, but the hospital survived, and was taken over by the Crown. The charitable trust that now manages the property believes that this survival was probably due to the function of the chapel as a place of public worship as well as part of the hospice. At the time of the dissolution, the hospital's revenues were valued at £16.1s.6½d.

In 1572 Elizabeth I granted the ownership of the foundation to Thomas Fanshawe, who was obliged to provide "a Master, a Chaplain and support for six poor men". Under the Commonwealth the Fanshawes' lands were confiscated, and though they regained possession after the Restoration they relinquished the ownership, which passed to the Gascoyne family in about 1727, and then, through marriage, into the possession of the Marquesses of Salisbury in 1821. The latter remained owners until 1982, when the sixth Marquess handed over the foundation to the Diocese of Chelmsford, which set up the Abbess Adelicia Charity that now manages the site. Since 1954 the hospital has been a listed building; it has Grade II* status, the second most important category.

Chaplains of the hospital have included the writer Bennet Allen in the 1780s; the orientalist James Reynolds from 1837 to 1866; the future Bishop of Durham, Hensley Henson from 1895 to 1900; and W J Sparrow Simpson, librettist of John Stainer's The Crucifixion, who held the post from 1904 to 1952.

== Structure ==
The complex consists of the chapel itself with almshouses on each side which were the quarters of the poor brethren and the chaplains. Under the Abbess Adelicia Charity the almshouses have been converted internally into modern flats.

The chapel has rubble walls covered with cement; the roofs are tiled. The nave and chancel are believed to have been rebuilt during the 14th century. The building underwent drastic Victorian attempts at restoration in 1889–90 when the north porch, organ chamber, south aisle, chapel and vestry were added and in the view of English Heritage, the nave was probably extended westwards.

The chancel, 6.4 metres (21 ft) by 5 metres (16 ft), has an early 15th-century east window of three cinque-foiled lights all heavily restored. At the east end there are late 14th or early 15th century windows in the north and south walls. The remaining details are from the 19th century or later. The only ancient details of the six-bay nave, 19.8 metres (65 ft), by 5 metres (16 ft) are two heavily restored windows, probably early 14th-century, and two trefoiled lights with tracery in a two-centred head. The reredos in the Lady Chapel is by Ninian Comper. The rose window over the west door is attributed to Henry Holiday, and the west aisle window is by Edward Burne-Jones. The organ was installed in the early 20th century. The chaplain's house and almshouses were rebuilt in 1927.

== Public access ==
There is a midday Communion service every Thursday. The chapel has an open day on the second Saturday of each month from March to November inclusive, and takes part in the annual London Open House weekend in September.

== Gallery ==
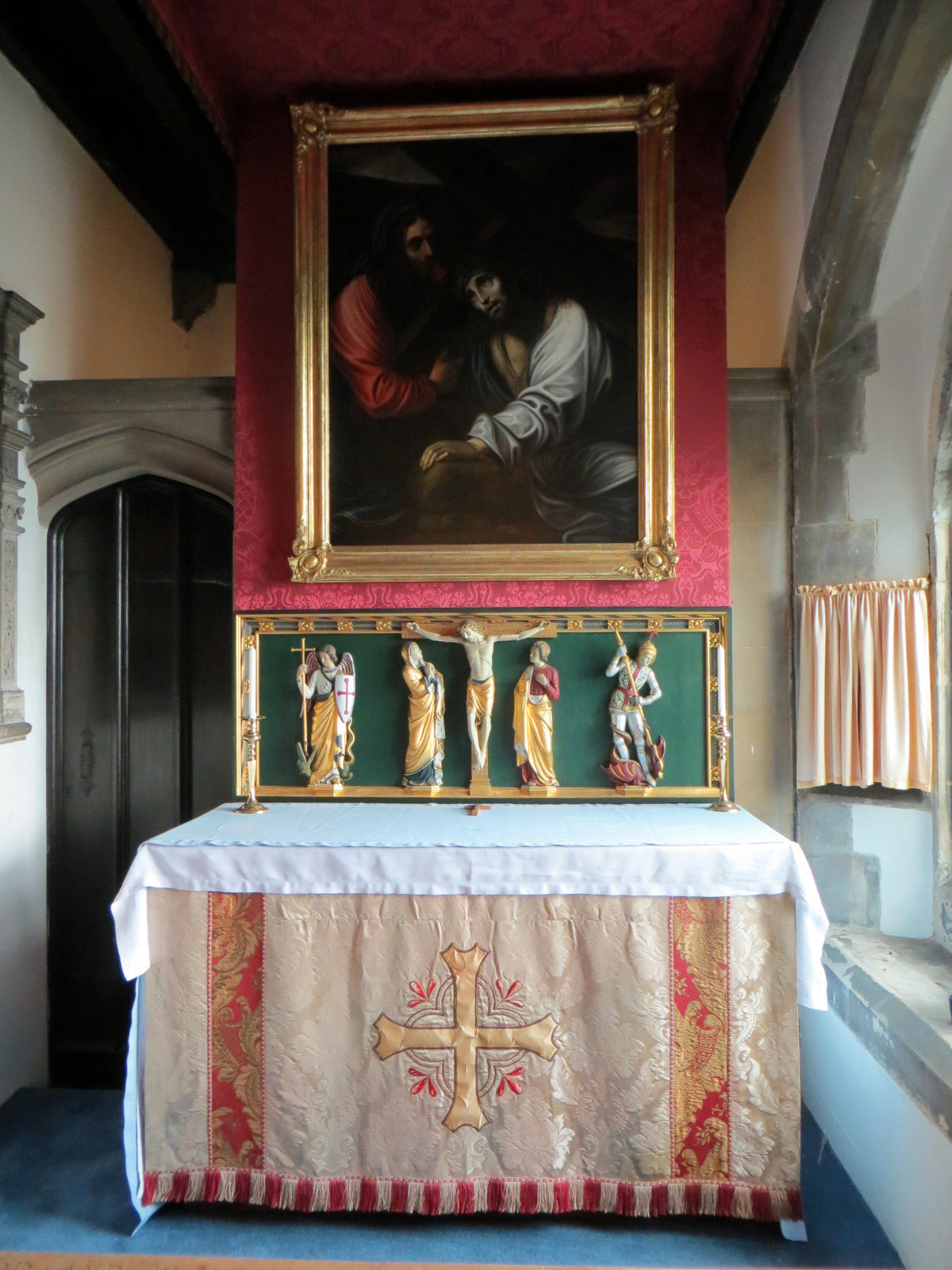
Lady Chapel

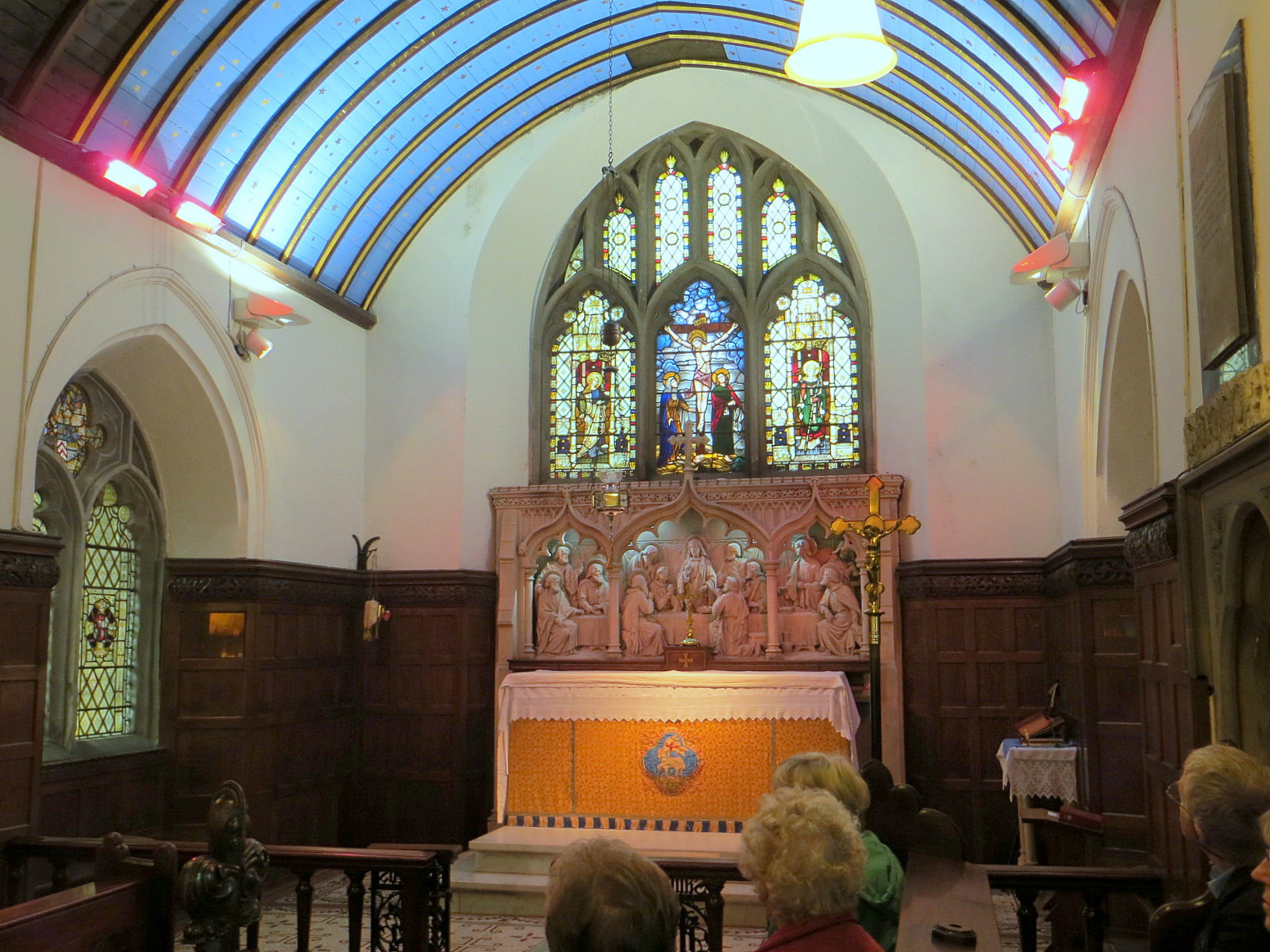
Reredos
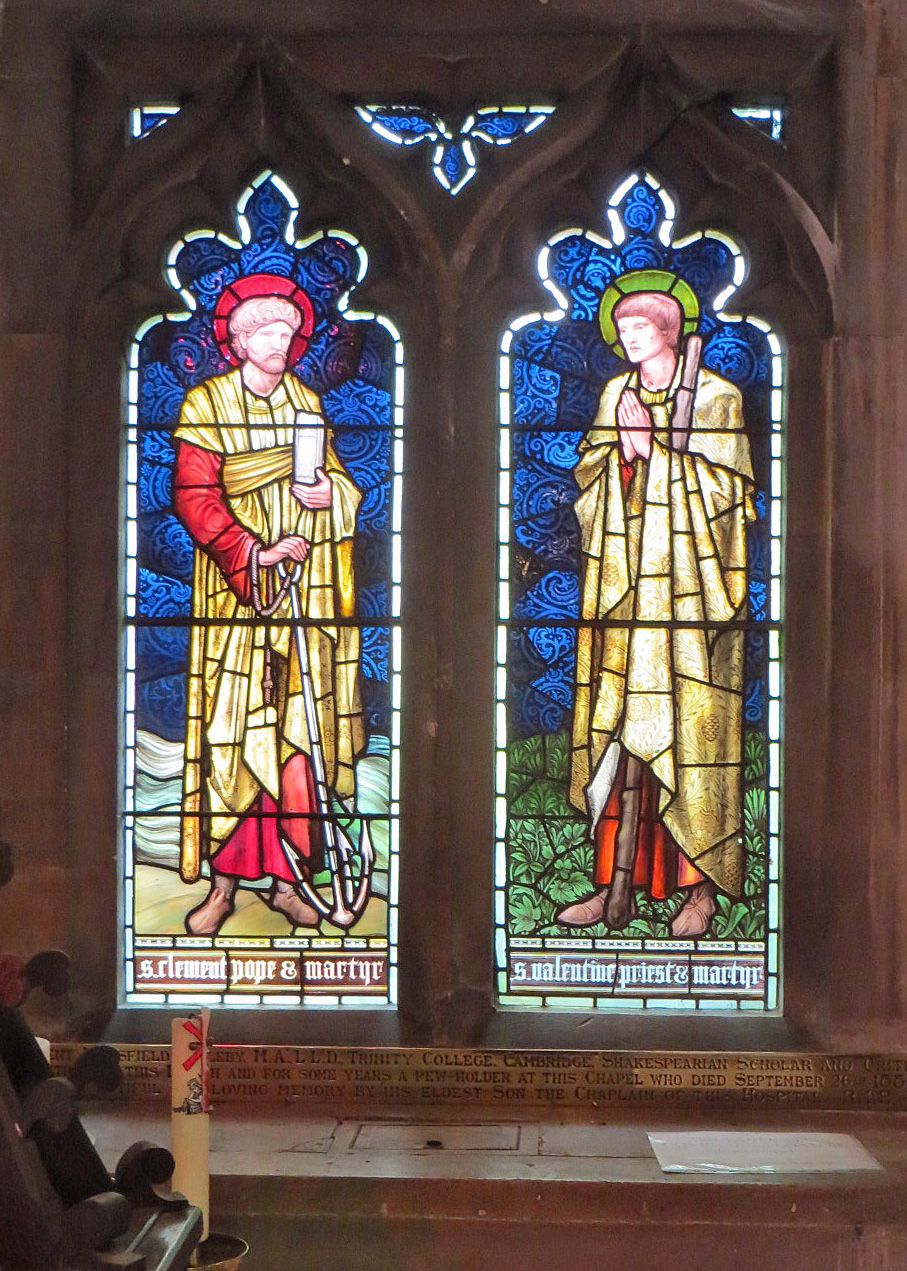
Window, south aisle
