= Church of St Peter, Holton-le-Clay =

Church in Holton-le-Clay, Lincolnshire, England

Coordinates: 53°30′22″N 0°03′42″W

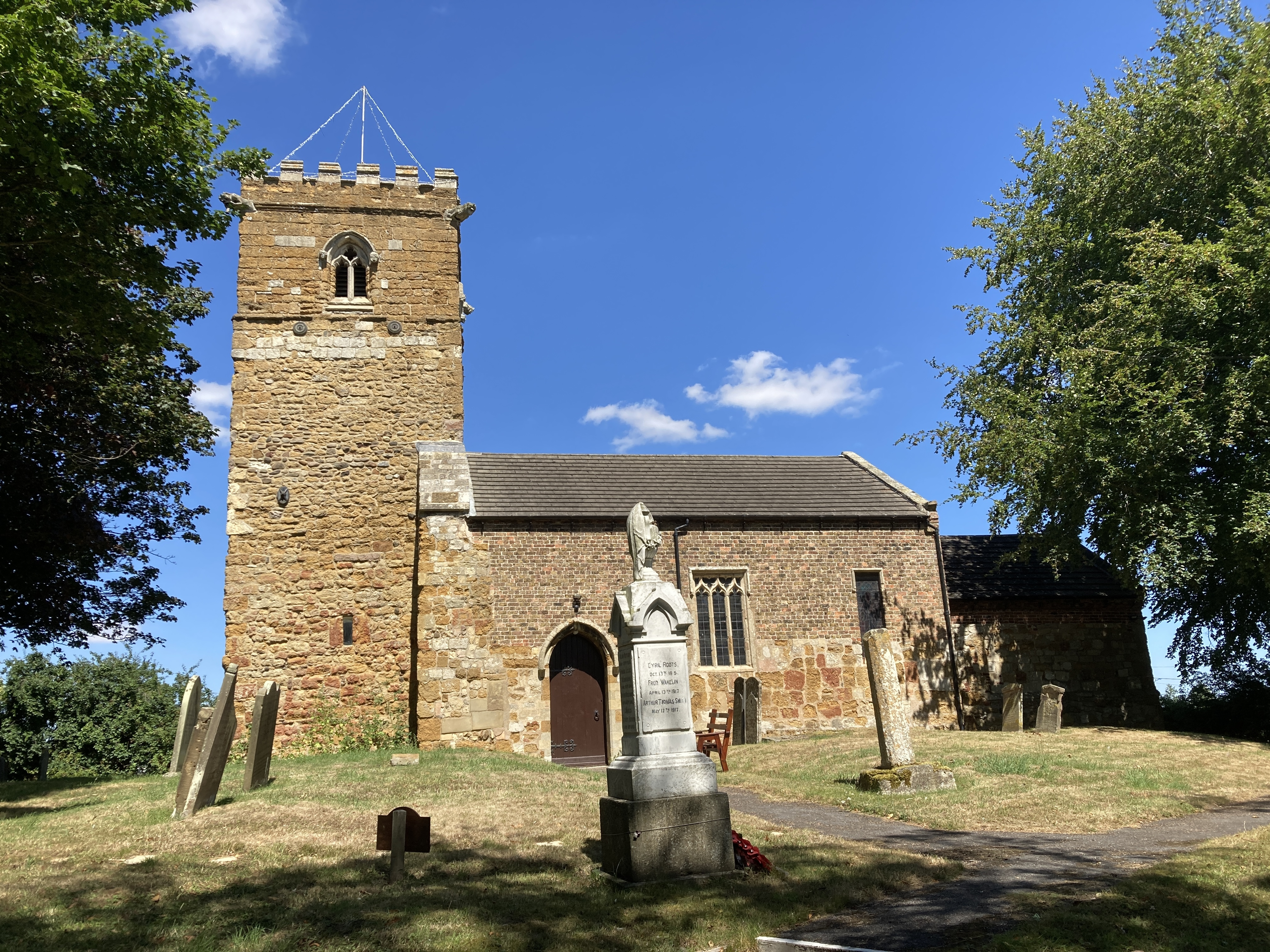
Church of St Peter in Holton-le-Clay (2022)

The Church of St Peter is the Grade II* listed Anglican parish church for the village of Holton-le-Clay in Lincolnshire. It is dedicated to St Peter and consists of chancel, nave, and an embattled tower with three bells. It is built of coursed and squared ironstone and limestone rubble with red and brown brick with plain grey concrete tiled roofs. St Peter's forms part of a united benefice with the churches of St. Nicholas in North Cotes and St. Peter and St. Paul in Tetney.

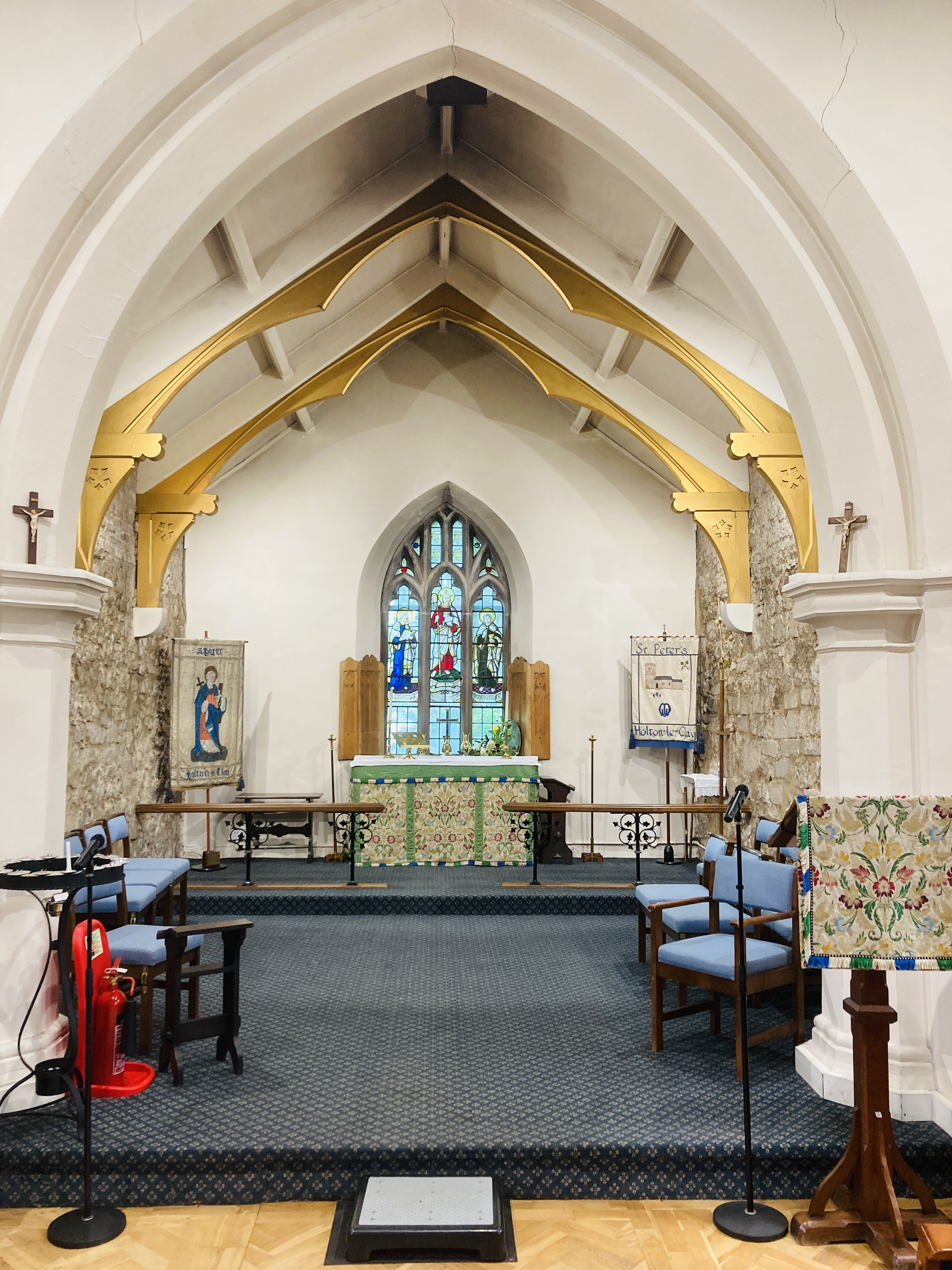
The chancel

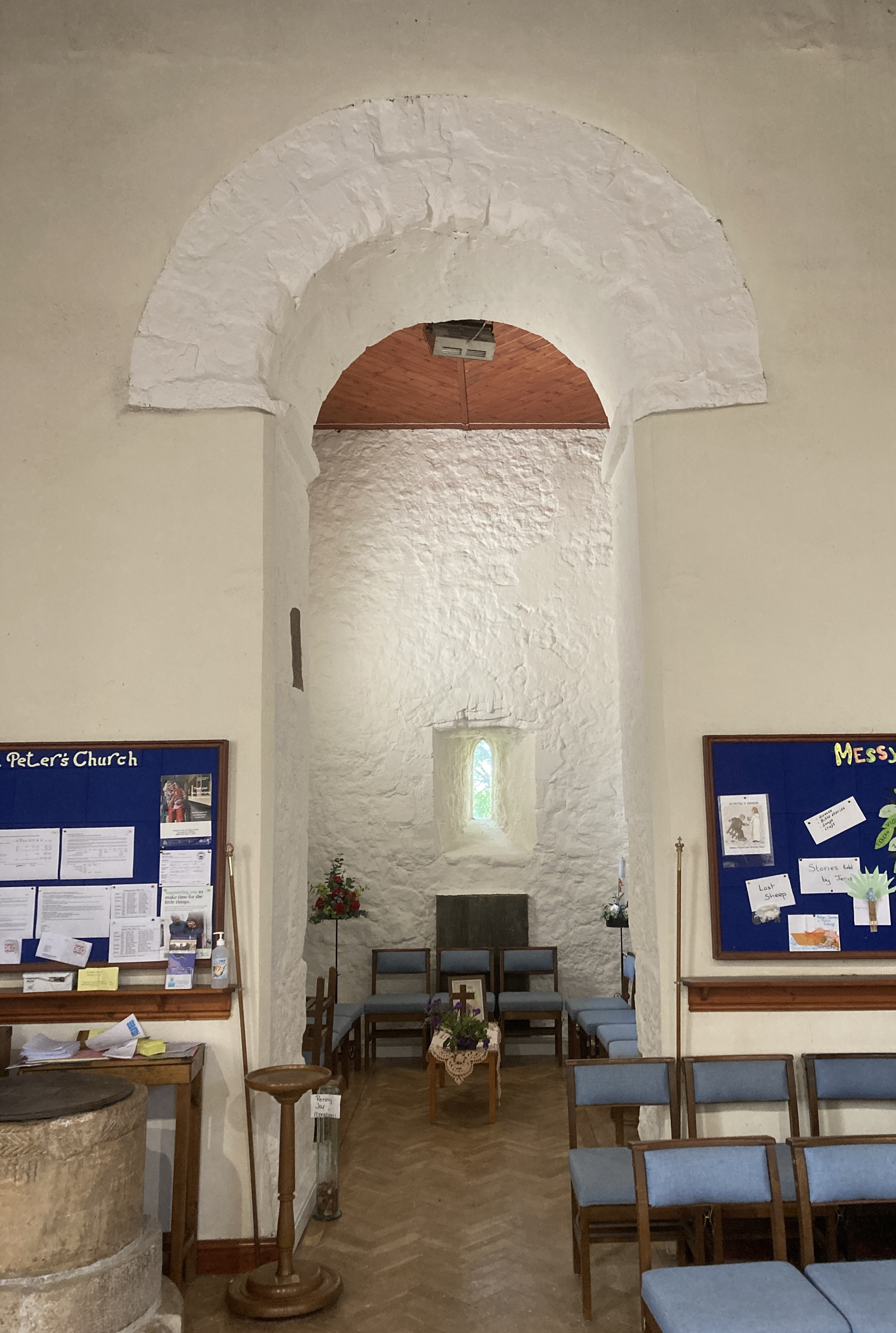
The tall and thin tower arch dates to the 11th-century

The square unbuttressed tower, chancel and nave arch are of Saxon or of very early Norman date of the 11th-century. The tower arch also dates from the 11th-century and is tall and narrow with a rounded head. In the west wall can be seen traces of a blocked door with a rounded head and in the blocking a 13th-century lancet window. The nave is partly built of massive square stones and in the north wall can be seen a blocked 16th-century four-centred arched doorway and a 14th-century three light window with ogee heads to the lights. The upper part of the chancel and the east wall of the nave were replaced with red brick during the restoration of 1850. The east window three lights and the double chamfered chancel arch are 19th-century. imposts. The south reveal is a reused piece of 10th-century sculpture with two panels of interlace. In the east wall of the nave can be found a piscina, probably reset in the 19th-century with a reset 13th-century cusped head. On the altar rail can be found a small carved mouse, the trademark of Robert 'Mouseman' Thompson.

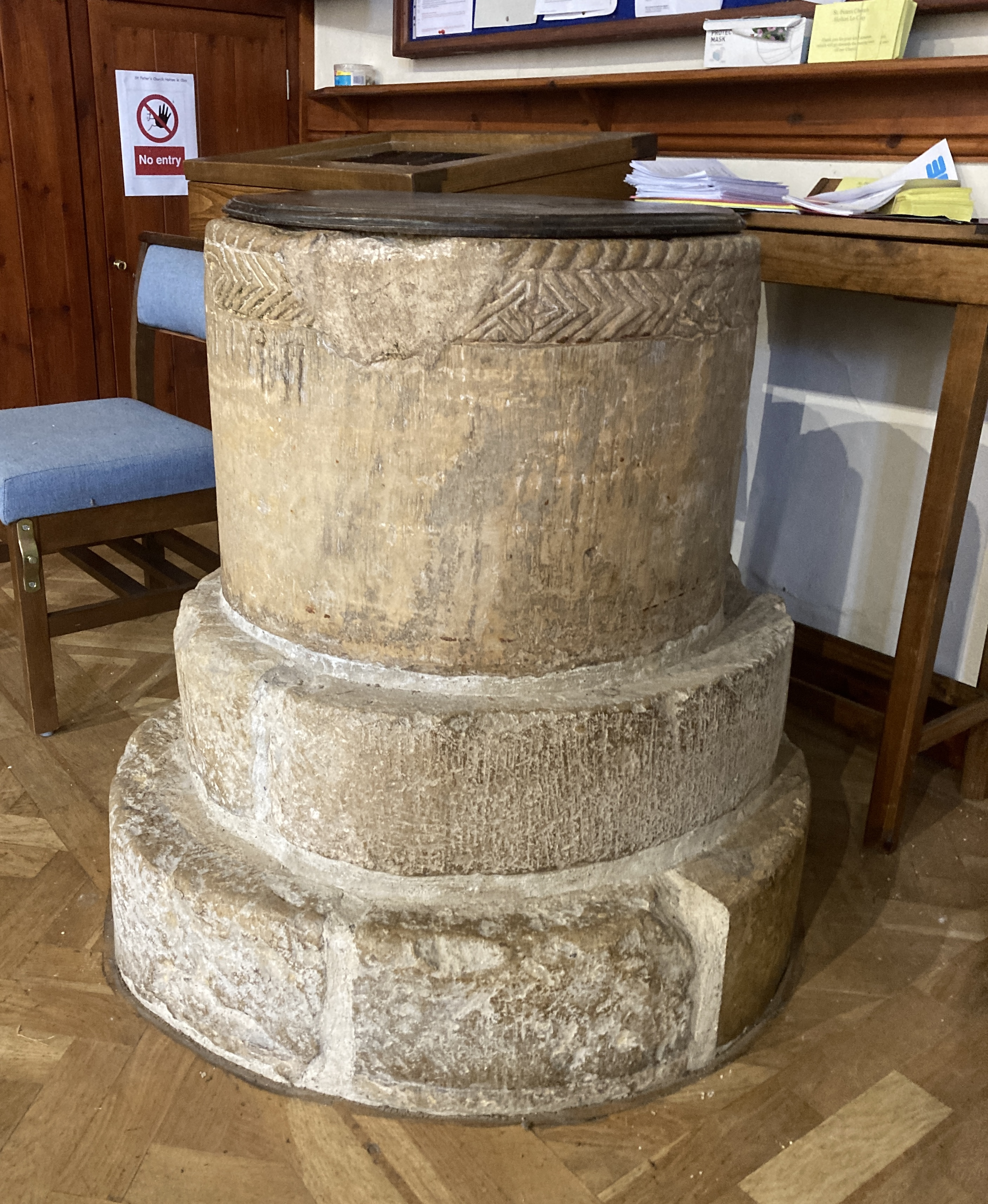
The tub font dates to the 12th-century

The church underwent rebuilding in the 13th, 14th and 16th-centuries and was repaired and partly rebuilt in 1850 by William Hay, and restored and repaired in 1868. Cox noted that it was "nearly rebuilt in brick in 1850, but the tower is one of the many Lincolnshire instances of late Saxon architecture", and in 1964 Pevsner described it as "A rough and, at the time of writing, neglected church", with an 11th-century tower and west window, Decorated bell-openings, a Norman 12th-century tub font with cable moulding around its rim and a panel of chevrons. The church has a 1636 Paten cover. Within the churchyard to the south east of the south door are the remains of a 14th-century standing stone cross. All that remains is the stone ashlar socket base, now partly buried, and the limestone shaft. The cross is a Grade II scheduled monument.

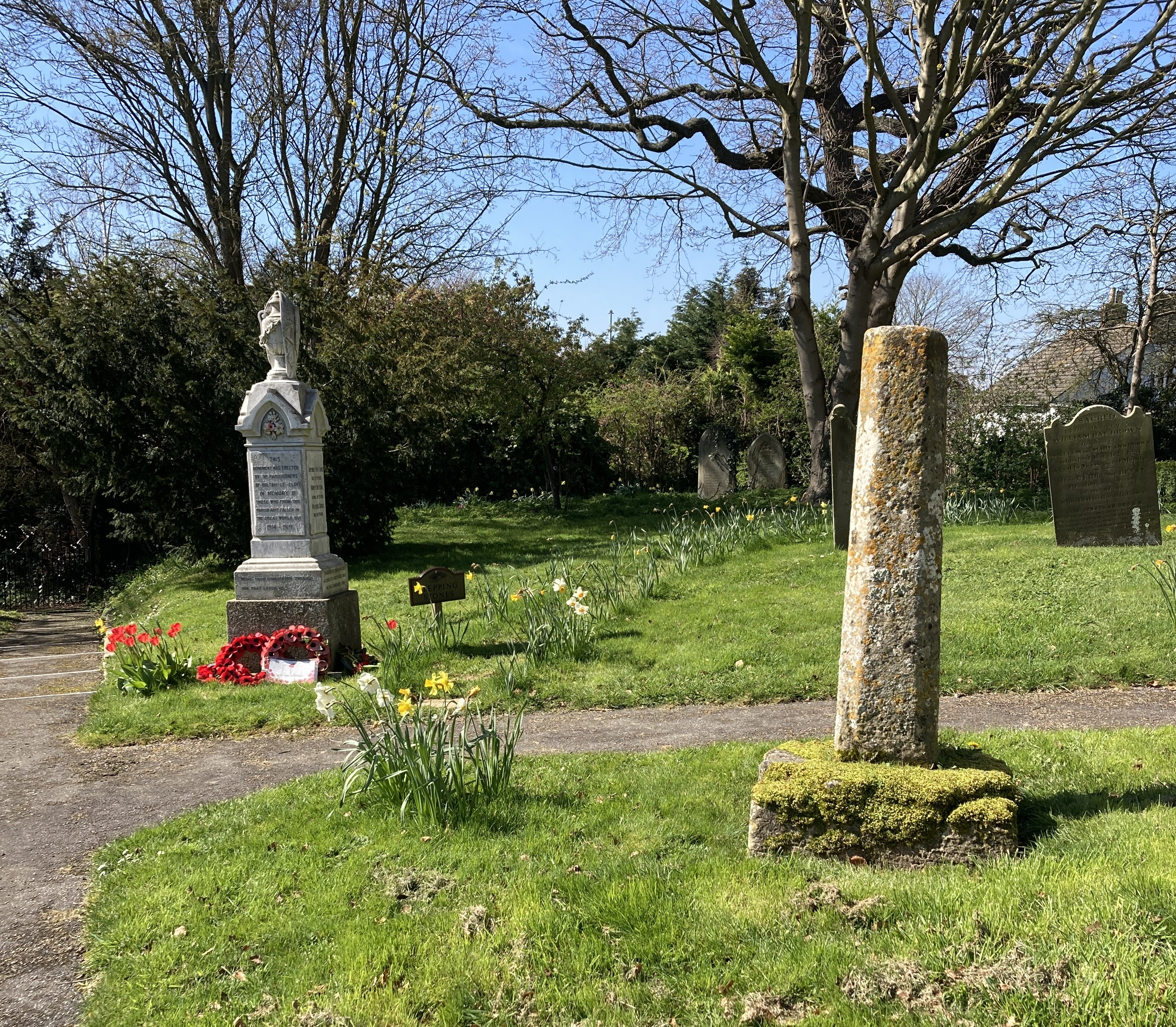
The remains of the medieval standing cross, and behind it the village war memorial

Near to the remains of the standing cross can be found the village war memorial, paid for by public subscription and unveiled in 1919. This is a marble square pillar standing on a concrete base. Featured at the top of the pillar is a decorative marble urn which is half-covered with marble carved to resemble flowing cloth. On the pillar in lead lettering are the names of the six men of the village who died during World War I. Names of the four locals who died in World War II were added after that conflict.
