= John Henry Maunder =

English composer and organist

- Born: 21 February 1858; Chelsea, England
- Died: 21 January 1920 (aged 61)
- Occupations: Composer; Organist

John Henry Maunder (21 February 1858 – 21 January 1920) was an English composer and organist best known for his popular Passion cantata Olivet to Calvary, composed in 1904.

== Life ==
John Henry Maunder was born in Chelsea and studied at the Royal Academy of Music in London. He was organist at St Matthew's, Sydenham 1876–77, and St Paul's, Forest Hill 1878–79, neither of which now exists, as well as churches in Blackheath and Sutton, and accompanied concerts in the Royal Albert Hall. He was conductor of the Civil Service Vocal Union from 1881, and also trained the choir for Henry Irving's original production of Faust at the Lyceum Theatre in 1887.

== Compositions ==
Like the music of his close contemporary Caleb Simper, Maunder's music goes unmentioned in Grove's Dictionary of Music, probably because he did not emerge from the cathedral tradition. His works are characteristic expressions of the Victorian era – a style replaced by the music of Charles Villiers Stanford, Hubert Parry and Charles Wood among others.

Maunder's many church cantatas were widely performed and admired, but have gone out of fashion. However, there is a revival of interest in his music, notably in The Netherlands, and in parts of the United Kingdom. Many choirs used to (and occasionally still) sing Maunder's Olivet to Calvary (words by Shapcott Wensley – pseudonym for H S Bunce) regularly, often in alternate years with John Stainer's Crucifixion. Other once popular but now seldom performed cantatas include Bethlehem, Penitence, Pardon and Peace, Song of Thanksgiving, and one called The Martyrs initially written for men's voices. The Martyrs, first performed in Oxford on 25 May 1894, became "a perennial favourite".

The harvest anthem Praise the Lord, O Jerusalem (1897), perhaps one of his finest, is a typical multi-sectional work of 150 measures (bars). Maunder wrote a number of part-songs, including a piece called Thor’s War Song (from Longfellow's Tales of a Wayside Inn), and a musical setting of the Border Ballad by Sir Walter Scott.

Maunder also wrote operettas. His Daisy Dingle received its first performance in Forest Hill in 1885. Another, a comic opera entitled The Superior Sex, was performed at the Empire Theatre, Southend, in March 1909, and again at the Cripplegate Theatre, London, in February 1910. Set in 2005 A.D., it takes a humorous look at female emancipation by setting an inept army regiment (the 125th Indefencibles) against legendary female-warriors, the Amazons. The balance of power then shifts from one side to the other, and receives much comment, before reverting in a dramatic final scene.

== Critical opinion ==
In his A Short History of English Church Music, Erik Routley traced John Stainer's The Crucifixion (1887) as the archetypal choral work deliberately written for amateur choirs that others imitated, and often diluted.

"Much of [Stainer's] music and the whole of [his] libretto where it is not quoting scripture, is a caricature of the sensational triviality which, no matter how great the efforts of their latter day defenders, we are bound to attribute to the Victorians. From The Crucifixion you go down into the underworld of Michael Costa, Caleb Simper and John Henry Maunder (the last two of whom prompted Vaughan Williams once to enliven one of his pugnacious comments about all this with the phrase 'composers with ridiculous names': their names are about the one thing these composers couldn't help; other aspects of their activities are less innocent)."

However, in 1922, an American reviewer for The New Music Review wrote the following concerning Maunder's work:

"An enthusiastic choirmaster once declared that the organists and choristers of the English-speaking world should unite to raise a monument to J. H. Maunder as a great benefactor of the human race in general and of church musicians in particular, because he combined in his voluminous writings for the church two factors which are both most highly to be commended and yet which are seldom found in the same composer, i.e., a good musical style and great technical facility. The music of Maunder is always well-written and thoroughly musical and devotional in feeling, and yet it is always easy to sing. Any amateur parish choir can attempt it, and yet it is worth the attention of even the best choral organizations. There is always a fresh and apparently inexhaustible flow of melodic ideas and the harmonic fabric is always full of interest and color and yet never unduly complicated. These remarks apply to all his writings, and may be made of the service [i.e. The Service in G] suggested for this day."

Percy Scholes damnned him with faint praise, writing that his 'seemingly inexhaustible cantatas, Penitence, Pardon and Peace, and From Olivet to Calvary long enjoyed popularity, and still aid the devotions of undemanding congregations in less sophisticated areas.' In 1966, Basil Ramsey wrote in the Musical Times of the LP recording of Olivet to Calvary by Barry Rose and the Guildford Cathedral Choir: "Here is a perplexing problem. Does this work warrant the preparation that has resulted in such an irresistible performance? Sweeping transformations can be made to music, however questionable its worth; and even poor words take on a superior air in such circumstances. The delusion will work for some and not others." According to Robert Young, author of The Anthem in England and America (1970), Maunder's music was probably more esteemed by volunteer church choir singers than his peers.

Phillip Tolley, in the website of British Choirs on the Net, wrote:

Olivet to Calvary is a fine example of music written for the late Victorian/early Edwardian Anglican church. Considered by some to be over sentimental by modern tastes, it contains a sincerity and dedication which, despite being a definite product of its time, has carried the piece through to the modern era. Its popularity is in part due to its simplicity, needing only organ, choir, bass and tenor soloists (some editions include Soprano solo for the final aria), it is a work which can be performed by the smallest choirs. Described as a sacred cantata, Olivet to Calvary recalls the scenes which mark the last few days of Christ's passion. Part 1 starts with Christ's jubilant journey to Jerusalem and ends with the scene on the Mount of Olives. Part 2 begins with the Feast of Passover with Christ's commandment to his disciples to 'Love one Another' and ends with the Crucifixion at Calvary. It is interspersed with congregational hymns which reflect on the scenes.

== List of works ==
=== Anthems ===
- Blessed be the Name of the Lord. Anthem (1896)
- Christ is risen. Anthem for Easter (1892)
- Christians, awake, salute the happy Morn. Anthem for Christmas (1895)
- Conquering Kings their Titles take. Hymn-Anthem, words from Nevers Breviary, tr. John Chandler (1899)
- It is a thing most wonderful. Hymn-Anthem, words by W. W. How (1900)
- Lord, Thy Children guide and keep. Hymn-Anthem, words by W. W. How (1913)
- O how amiable are Thy Dwellings. Anthem for treble voices (1906)
- O how amiable are Thy Dwellings. Anthem for four voices (1910)
- O worship the King. Anthem for congregation and choir (1898)

- Rongyao da jun wang ge = O worship the King : anthem for congregation and choir / William Croft; arr. J.H. Maunder; [words by] Robert Grant (1898)

- Praise the Lord, O Jerusalem. Anthem for Harvest (1897)

- Praise the Lord, O Jerusalem. Abridged Edition, arr. by Rob Roy Peery (1957)

- Sing, O Heavens. Anthem for Christmas and Epiphany (1907)
- Sing to the Lord of Harvest. Anthem for Harvest, words by Dr. Monsell (1893)
- Sing unto the Lord. Anthem (1895)

- Sing unto the Lord. – Abridged Edition. – Anthem (1896)

- This is the Day. Anthem for Easter, (1914)
- To Thee, Our God, We Fly. A Prayer for our Native Land. Words by W.Walsham How
- We declare unto you glad Tidings. Anthem (1897)
- While the Earth remaineth. Anthem for Harvest (1895)

=== Cantatas ===
- Bethlehem. A Sacred Cantata for four solo voices and chorus, interspersed with Hymns to be sung by the congregation. The words written and arranged by E. C. Nunn (1910)
- The Martyrs. Cantata for male voices – with soli – and orchestra, libretto by R. H. W. Bloor (1894)

- The Martyrs. Cantata for Soli, Chorus and Orchestra ... Mixed voice edition (1908)

- Olivet to Calvary. A sacred cantata for two solo voices (tenor and baritone) and chorus, words by Shapcott Wensley (1904)

- Olivet to Calvary. [Orchestral parts.] (1905)

- Penitence, Pardon and Peace. A short Lenten Cantata for Soprano or Tenor and Baritone Soli and Chorus. The words by W. J. Bettison (1898)

- Penitence, Pardon and Peace. [Band parts available from Goodwin and Tabb Ltd. (now part of the Music Sales Group)] (1901)

- Song of Thanksgiving. A Cantata for Harvest for Soprano, Tenor and Bass – or Contralto – Soli and Chorus, with Hymns to the sung by the congregation, the words written and arranged by Shapcott Wensley (1905)

- Song of Thanksgiving. [Orchestral parts.] (1905/06)

- William Tell. A Dramatic Cantata for schools, written by J. E. Parrott (1894)

=== Carols ===
- Once in Bethlehem of Judah. Christmas Carol, words by C. F. Alexander (1888) [No. 434 in Hutchins (ed.), Carols Old & Carols New (Boston: Parish Choir, 1916)]
- Two Carols for Christmas. 1. All this night bright Angels sing, words by W. Austin. 2. Angels from the realms of glory, words by J. Montgomery (1895)

=== Hymns ===
- Bread of heaven on thee we feed, words by Josiah Conder (1905) [part of the Office of Communion in F]
- By day and night in secret [A Harvest Hymn of Praise], words by W. H. Draper (1904)
- Come forth, ye rich and poor [The Joy of Harvest. A Hymn of Thanksgiving], words by W. H. Draper (1901)
- Creator God and Lord [*Novello's Music for Sunday School Festivals]
- Dear motherland of England, to the tune Albion, words by W. C. Braithwaite (1906), appearing in the Fellowship Hymnbook (1908)
- Father, Hear Thy Little Children, adapted from the tune Rothbury, words by Alice Jackson (1929)
- Flowers from His Own gardens, to the tune Excelsior, words by W. St. Hill Bourne [1900]
- For ever and for ever [*Novello's Music for Sunday School Festivals]
- Forward! be our watchword, to the tune Excelsior, words by H. Alford (c.1897)
- God Almighty, in thy temple, to the tune Parry, words by Rev. R. H. Baynes (1894)
- God bless our Native Land, to the tune Fatherland, words by W. E. Hickson (1903)
- God of our Fatherland. Hymn for Coronation, words by A. W. Letts (1911)
- Great King of Kings, to Thee we Pray, to the tune Martham, words by Rev. H. D. Rawnsley (1897)
- I hear Ten Thousand Voices Singing, to the tune Jubilee/Maunder, words by H. W. Fox (1894) [available via Cyber Hymnal]
- I love to hear the story, to the tune Kilverstone, words by E. H. Miller [1900]
- Jesus Friend of Little Children, to the tune Rothbury, words by Walter J. Mathams (1892)
- Just as I am, words by C. Elliott. (1904) [No. 1 of Three Hymns from Olivet to Calvary] [available via CPDL]
- Long Ago sweet voices calling [*Novello's Music for Sunday School Festivals]
- Lord of the Sabbath, to the tune Martham, words by P. Doddridge, T. Cotterill et al. (1897)
- Now let us join with hearts and tongues, to the tune Martham, words by John Newton (1897)
- O God, in whose almighty hand, words by Rev Canon Rawnsley (1911)
- Pass the word along the line, to the tune Dunbar, words by H. O Knowlton (1892)
- Raise the Song, ye loyal Voices. Hymn for Coronation, words by The Rt. Rev. The Bishop of Durham (1902)
- Rock of Ages, words by A. M. Toplady, etc. (1904) [No. 3 of Three Hymns from Olivet to Calvary] [available via CPDL]
- This Day at Thy Creating Word, to the tune Martham, words by W. W. How (1897)
- The Whole Wide World for Jesus, words by Catherine Johnson (1894) [or with words by J. Dempster Hammond (1880), available via Cyber Hymnal]
- Thy Will be done, words by S. Wensley (1904) [No. 2 of Three Hymns from Olivet to Calvary] [available via CPDL]
- What can I do for England, to the tune Albion, words by W. H. Draper (1909)

=== Services and Canticles ===
- A short setting of the Office of Holy Communion in G (1891)
- A simple setting of the Office of Holy Communion in F (1904)
- Amen in G (1894) [included in the Service in G, part of the Office for Holy Communion]
- Benedicite, omnia opera. Set to chants. (1885)
- Benedicite, omnia opera. No. 2, in G, (1889)
- Magnificat & Nunc Dimittis in C (1890)
- Magnificat & Nunc Dimittis in D (No. 2) (1892)
- Magnificat & Nunc Dimittis in G (1896) [included in the Service in G]
- Office of Holy Communion in D (1914)
- Te Deum Laudamus in B♭ (1891)
- The Morning and Evening Service together with the Office for Holy Communion in Chant Form (Service No. 1) (1906)
- The Morning and Evening Service together with the Office for Holy Communion in G (1906)

=== Songs, Ballads, and Part-songs ===
- America, to Thee. A Song of allegiance for secular and sacred use (1943)
- Border Ballad. For Male Voice Chorus, words by Sir W. Scott (1912)

- Border Ballad. For Mixed Voice Chorus, words by Sir W. Scott (1912)

- Grandmother dear. Song, words by C. Bingham (1903)
- Lead kindly Light. Sacred Song with Organ and Chorus ad lib. Words by A. Russan (1896)
- Lil' brack Sheep. A Negro Version of The Ninety and nine. Sacred Song (1906)

- Lil Brack Sheep. Negro Spiritual, freely arr. Leslie Woodgate. (No.1) in E♭ = Low Voice & piano. (1945)
- Lil brack Sheep. Negro Spiritual. Melody by J. H. Maunder. Freely arranged for Mixed Voices by Leslie Woodgate (1947)

- O lovely Flowers. Sacred Song. Arranged and adapted by the Composer [in A and G] (1909)
- Ocean charms. Part song for male voices, words by G. Wells (1885)
- Our Motherland. Unison Chorus, words by E. Moynihan (1916)
- Shadow and Sunlight. Song, words by A. Valdemar. [In D and F.] (1897)
- Song of the Northmen. Chorus for T. T. B. B., words by R. H. U. Bloor (1899)
- Thor's War Song. Chorus for male voices, words by Longfellow (1880)
- The Song of Thor. [Chorus for mixed voices.] (1907)

- The Song of Thor, for SATB & piano (G major version) (1911)
- The Song of Thor. [Orchestral parts.] (1908)

- Sweet Content. Part-Song for S. A. T. B., words by T. Dekker (1910)
- To Arms. Part-Song for male voices, T. T. B. B., words by E. Newman (1910)

=== Instrumental ===
- Caprice, in A, for Violin and Pianoforte (1907)
- The Caravan of the Magi. March for Organ, arr. by E. C. Nunn, from the Cantata Bethlehem (1913)
- Chanson Pathétique, for Violin with Pianoforte accompaniment (1909)
- Espagnola. Solo for violin or flute or violoncello with pianoforte accompaniment (1883)

- Espagnola. Caprice for the Pianoforte (1885)

- Romance, in B♭ for Violoncello and Pianoforte (1907)
- Voix Séraphique, for the Mustel Organ with celesta (1896)

=== Operettas ===
- The Superior Sex. A Comic Opera in Three Acts, libretto by H. D. Banning (1910)
- Daisy Dingle (unpublished). Private performance, Grosvenor Hall, 1879; Benefit Concert, The Forester's Hall, Forest Hill, 1885.

=== Other ===
- The passion of Jesus: a metrical litany for Holy Week or Lent, for choir and congregation, words by S.C. Lowry (1909)
- A dramatization of J. H. Maunder's Bethlehem: a Christmas cantata, done in the manner of the medieval miracle play; written by Catharine Morgan (c.1939)
