= Caleb Simper =

English composer and church organist

- Born: 12 September 1856; Barford St Martin, Wiltshire, England
- Died: 28 August 1942 (aged 85)
- Other name: Edwyn A. Clare
- Occupations: Organist; Composer; Choirmaster

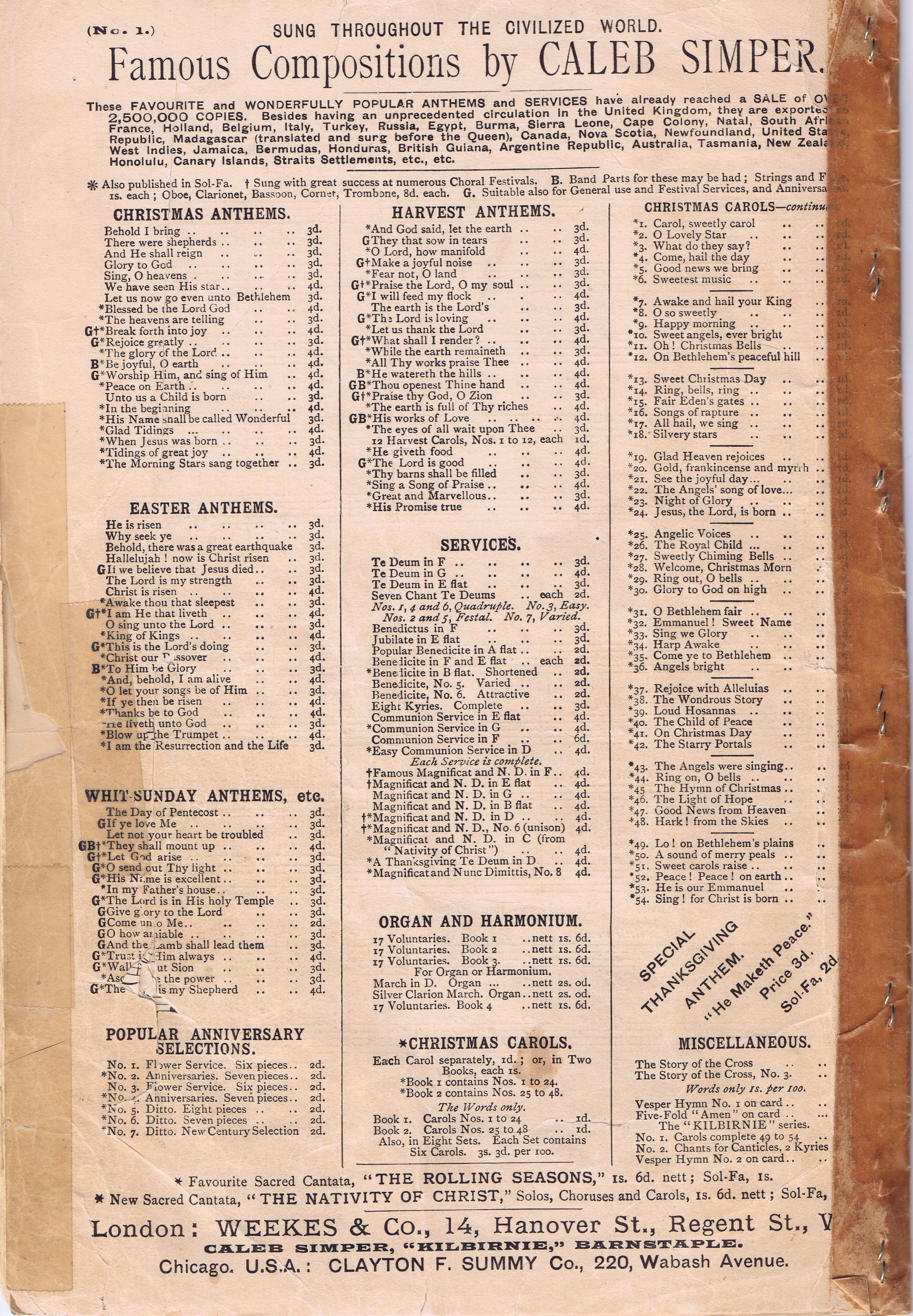
Break Forth into Joy back cover, note this cover states that over 2.5 million copies had been sold

Caleb Simper (12 September 1856 – 28 August 1942) was an English composer and church organist. He also published his compositions under the pseudonym Edwyn A. Clare.

He gained fame for his prolific output of choral cantatas, anthems and organ works, which were widely performed and sold in their millions. His straightforward, sometimes simplistic and over sentimental style was written with amateur performance in mind, and can be compared to that of his close contemporary, John Henry Maunder.

== Career ==
Simper was born in the village of Barford St Martin, Wiltshire, the son of a shoemaker. After a period in Worcester, where he worked in a music shop that was owned by the Elgar family. He moved in the 1890s to Barnstaple where he spent the remainder of his active life working as a composer, and as choirmaster and organist at St Mary Magdalene's Church.

He produced a prodigious amount of Anglican church music and organ pieces, written in an unsophisticated, popular style and aimed at small parish choirs and unskilled organists. Although ignored if not derided by critics, his anthems in particular became widely popular and were sold by his publisher under the slogan "Sung throughout the civilized world". He composed over 160 anthems under his own name and many others under the pseudonym of Edwyn A Clare. Over five million copies had been sold by the 1920s and a few works remain in print today, though Simper's musical style has long since fallen from fashion.

Amongst Simper's larger works are the cantatas, The Rolling Seasons (1897) and The Nativity of Christ (1898). He also wrote somewhere in the region of 200 pieces of organ music and several miscellaneous works such as The Silver Clarion, a march which exists in a version for organ and a version for pianoforte.

His publisher was A. Weekes and Co. Ltd, whose catalogue was eventually acquired by Stainer & Bell.

Some works were published in tonic sol-fa notation. His organ voluntaries were written as practical music for organists of limited technical ability, easy to play and laid out on two staves.

== Legacy ==
There is still some demand for simple, practical church music. However, history has not been kind to the efforts of a group of Victorian musicians who produced many oratorios and cantatas in this category. In his A Short History of English Church Music, Erik Routley traced John Stainer's The Crucifixion (1887) as the archetypal work that others imitated, and often diluted.

"Much of the rest of [Stainer's] music and the whole of [his] libretto where it is not quoting scripture, is a caricature of the sensational triviality which, no matter how great the efforts of their latter day defenders, we are bound to attribute to the Victorians. From The Crucifixion you go down into the underworld of Michael Costa, Caleb Simper and J.H. Maunder (the last two of whom prompted Vaughan Williams once to enliven one of his pugnacious comments about all this with the phrase 'composers with ridiculous names': their names are about the one thing these composers couldn't help; other aspects of their activities are less innocent)."

== Personal life ==
During the 1880s Simper was living at 9 Taw Vale Parade in Barnstaple. By 1897 his address was "Kilbirnie, Barnstaple". As of 2019, the house, at 34 Ashleigh Road, is extant.

Simper married his first wife, the Australian Emily Yates, in 1879. Their son, Roland Chalmers Simper, was also an organist (at Newport Church in Barnstaple) and music teacher. A Private in the British Army's Hertfordshire Regiment, Roland pre-deceased his father in 1917.

He remarried shortly after Emily's death in 1916 to Katherine Pearce, the daughter of a local baker. He was aged 60 and she was 32. Despite his popularity during his lifetime, Simper was mostly ignored by the musical establishment and his death at the age of 86 went unmarked by the press in 1942.
