= Kate Emma Boundy =

Kate Emma Boundy (1863–1913) was an English musician, considered by her contemporaries a gifted composer, many of whose small-scale works achieved considerable success in her lifetime.

== Life ==
Kate Boundy was born in Exeter, the eldest daughter of Mr. G.L. Boundy of Southcroft, Heavitree Road, Exeter.

She was a student at London's Royal College of Music, from where she obtained the associate diploma (ARCM).

In her later years ill health meant she was unable to walk and she made use of a wheelchair. She died while visiting her brother's house in Abergavenny, Wales. She was buried in the Higher Cemetery, Exeter.

== Works ==
=== Music for schools ===
- 1895: Good-night and good-morning. Kindergarten song. Words anon.
- 1896: Down in a green and shady bed. Two-part canon.
- 1896: The Ducking. Junior unison song. Words by E. Capern.
- 1896: Good-night and good-morning. Kindergarten Action Song.
- 1896: The Mill, the Rill, and the Bee. Junior unison song. Words by E. Capern.
- 1896: The Snowflakes. Junior unison song. Words by S.J. Mulford.
- 1897: The Nestlings. Kindergarten Song. Words by L.F. Pollard.
- 1901:"The Rival Flowers : an operetta for schools and classes. Words by Shapcott Wensley.
- 1903: The Fairy Ship. Junior unison song with ad lib. actions. Words by Mary Adamson. (Seriess: Novello School Songs).
- 1903: Patriotic Posies. An action piece. words by Mary Adamson.
- 1903: The Song of the Kettle. Junior unison song ad lib. Words by Mary Adamson.

=== Organ ===
- 1897: Andante grazioso ('The Village Organist', vol. 1).
- 1898: Even Song ('The Village Organist', vol. 2).
- 1898: Andante Patetico ('The Village Organist'. vol 5).

=== Sacred Music ===
- 1875: O Lord of Hosts: anthem for eight voices.

=== Songs ===
- 1886: My Gauntlet's down. Words by J. Kennedy.
- 1888: A Book of Four Songs
