= All for Jesus, All for Jesus =

Christian hymn

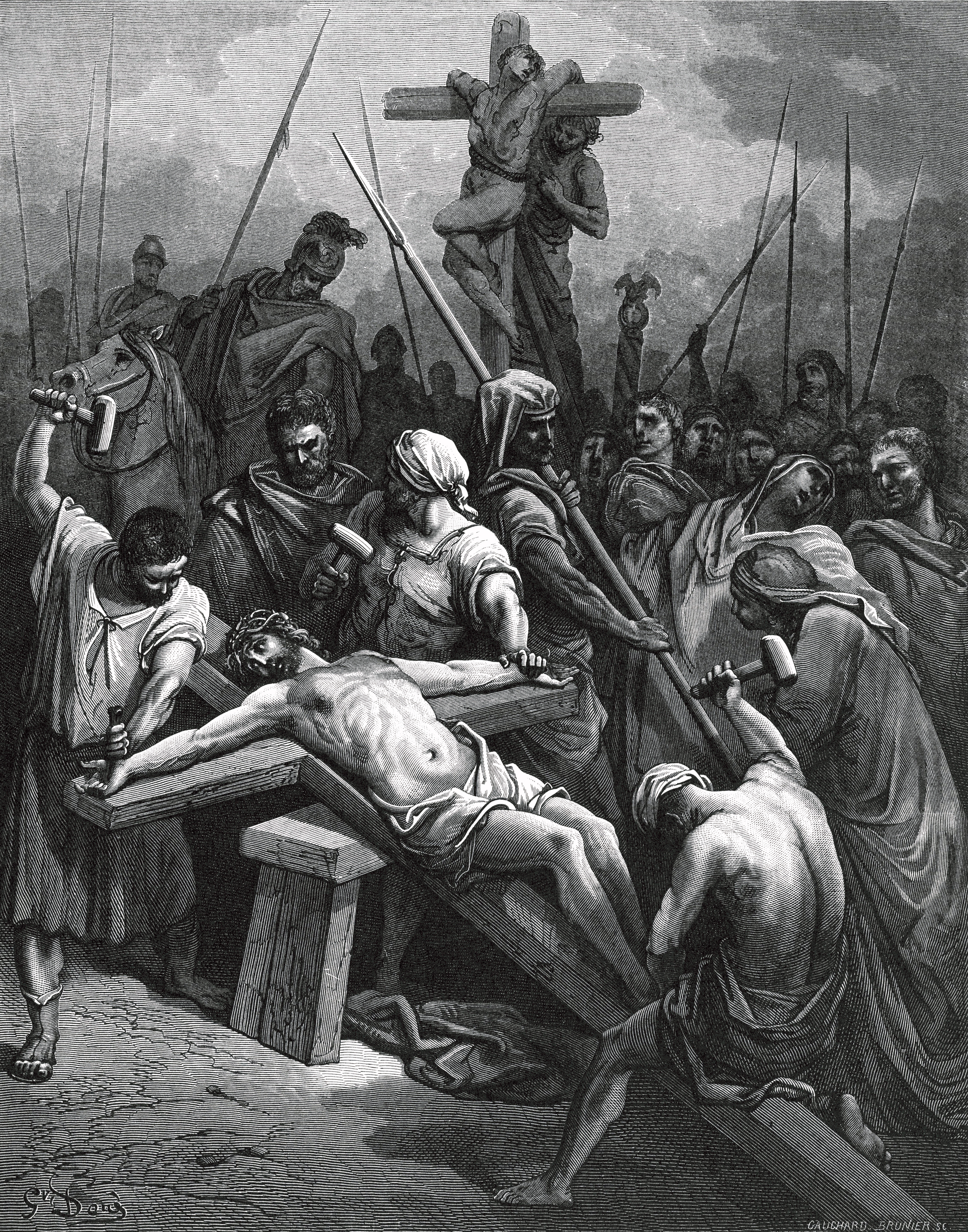
- "Crucifixion of Jesus" by Gustave Doré (1866)
- Genre: Hymn
- Written: 1887
- Text: W J Sparrow Simpson
- Based on: Matthew 22:37
- Meter: 8.7.8.7

"All for Jesus, All for Jesus", also titled as "All for Jesus! All for Jesus!" and originally titled "For the Love of Jesus", is an English Christian hymn. It was written in 1887 by W J Sparrow Simpson intended as the closing chorus of John Stainer's The Crucifixion oratorio. It started to be published as a separate hymn later in 1901.

== History ==
In 1887, Sparrow Simpson was the Church of England curate of Christ Church in Marylebone, London. He wrote "All for Jesus, All for Jesus" for The Crucifixion, where he had initially titled it "For the Love of Jesus". It was written as a "meditation on the Passion of the Holy Redeemer" with scriptural references from the New Testament. The music for the hymn was written by Stainer, with the piece being titled "All for Jesus". The hymn was intended as a closing chorus and, according to Reynolds, also to be a part of The Crucifixion set aside for congregational singing. The hymn was first performed in public at St Marylebone Parish Church on Ash Wednesday in 1887. After its first performance, "The Crucifixion" was praised in The Churchman as being "...a first and a very successful attempt to supply an easy and short form of Passion music suitable for use in ordinary parish churches," though Stainer had previously described it as "rubbish".

For several years, "All for Jesus, All for Jesus" was performed only as part of The Crucifixion. It was first published as a stand-alone hymn in 1969 in the Methodist hymnal Hymns and Songs. Since then it has been published as an independent hymn across Christian denominations. In Roman Catholic hymnals, an additional verse is included supporting the Catholic doctrine of transubstantiation despite Simpson being a member of the Church of England, which rejected that doctrine in the Thirty-Nine Articles.

== Scripture ==
"All for Jesus, All for Jesus" Matthew 19:21, Matthew 22:37, John 8:36, Romans 8:38–39, Romans 12:1, 1 Corinthians 2:2 and Ephesians 5:2.
