= W. J. Sparrow Simpson =

English Anglican cleric (1859–1952)

- Chaplain of Ilford Hospital Chapel
- Church: Church of England
- Province: Canterbury
- Diocese: Chelmsford
- In office: 1904–1952

Orders
- Ordination: 1882 (deacon); 1883 (priest)

Personal details
- Born: 2 June 1859 London, UK
- Died: 13 February 1952 (aged 92) Ilford, UK

William John Sparrow Simpson (20 June 1859 – 13 February 1952) was an English Anglican priest and writer. He wrote the libretto for John Stainer's oratorio The Crucifixion (1887), several hymns, and more than fifty books. He was chaplain of Ilford Hospital Chapel from 1904 until his death.

== Life ==
Sparrow Simpson was born in London, the son of the Rev William Sparrow Simpson, a minor canon of St Paul's and rector of St Vedast, Foster Lane. He was educated at St Paul's School, London and, from 1878, Trinity College, Cambridge. As an undergraduate he was awarded the Chancellor's Gold Medal for English verse in a competition judged by Robert Browning; he graduated with a first class degree in theology in 1882. In the same year he was ordained deacon, and went to Christ Church, Albany Street in Marylebone, London as curate. In the following year, in which he was ordained priest, he wrote the first of two libretti for choral works by John Stainer. These were the cantata St Mary Magdalen (1883) and the oratorio The Crucifixion (1887).

Sparrow Simpson was vicar of St Mark's, Regent's Park, 1888–1904, and moved to Ilford in 1904 as chaplain to the ancient almshouse foundation, the Ilford Hospital Chapel. He retained the post until his death at the age of 92. He became a Doctor of Divinity in 1911 and an honorary canon of Chelmsford in 1919. At Ilford, he housed and trained ordinands, known to the congregation as "the Doctor's boys". To finance the training he sold the Chancellor's Medal he had won at Cambridge.

The Ilford post was not onerous, and gave him ample time for research and writing. He became an authority on the life and doctrines of St Augustine of Hippo. In the view of The Times the most important of his more than fifty books was The Resurrection and Modern Thought (1911). He published several hymns, originally part of his libretto for Stainer, "All For Jesus, All For Jesus", "Jesus, the Crucified, prays for me", "Cross of Jesus, cross of sorrow", "Holy Jesu, by thy passion" and "I adore thee, I adore thee" He was a strong proponent of Anglo-Catholicism and was editor of the high-church English Church Review in the years before the First World War.

Sparrow Simpson died in Ilford at the age of 92.

== Books ==
The books Sparrow Simpson chose to mention in his Who's Who article were:

- The Catholic Conception of the Church, 1914
- Reconciliation and Atonement, 1916
- Reconciliation between God and Man, 1917
- The Prayer of Consecration, 1917
- French Catholics in the Nineteenth Century, 1918
- Broad Church Theology, 1919
- South Indian Schemes, 1930
- The History of the Anglo-Catholic Revival from 1845 to 1932
- Dispensations, 1936.
  Source: Who's Who
