= Shapcott Wensley =

Shapcott Wensley was the pseudonym of the English author and poet Henry Shapcott Bunce (1854 – 1 June 1917).

== Life ==
He was born in Bristol in the summer of 1854. He died in Bristol on 1 June 1917. He married a singer, Alice Mary Wensley, and they had one daughter, Gertrude. By profession he was a clerk in a soap works. As a poet he adopted the combined names of his mother and his wife as his pseudonym, Shapcott Wensley. He wrote lyrics for songs and librettos for cantatas. Among the composers he worked for were Edward Elgar and John Henry Maunder. Many of his texts were written on commission of the publishing house Novello.

== Works ==
- Summer on the River: a cantata for female voices, music by F. H. Cowen (1893)
- A Sea Dream: a cantata for female voices, music by Walter Battison Haynes (1893)
- The Banner of St. George: a ballad for chorus and orchestra, music by Edward Elgar (1896)
- The Gate of Life: a dramatic cantata, music by Franco Leoni (1898)
- The Story of Bethlehem: a short cantata, music by John E. West (1899)
- The Lark and the Nightingale: part-song for SATB, music by Reginald Somerville (1900)
- The Rival Flower: an operetta for schools and classes. Music by Kate Boundy.
- Olivet to Calvary: a sacred cantata, music by J. H. Maunder (1904)
- Song of Thanksgiving: a sacred cantata, music by J. H. Maunder (1905)
- Lo! Christ the Lord is born: a Christmas carol, music by Edward Elgar (1909)
- The Call of England: song, music by Albert Ham (1917)
- Our Soldiers, Welcome Home: song, music by Joseph L. Roeckel (1918)
- The Song of the Gale: part-song for SATB, music by Myles B. Foster (1924)
- While the Earth remaineth: cantata for SATB, organ, music by J. H. Maunder (?)
