= Battison Haynes =

English pianist, organist and composer

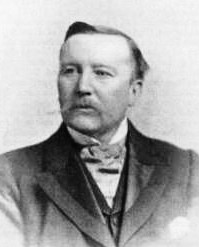
Battison Haynes

Walter Battison Haynes (21 November 1859 – 16 February 1900) was an English pianist, organist and composer.

== Biography ==
Haynes was born in Kempsey near Worcester. He received his earliest musical education from his uncle William Haynes, who was an organist at Great Malvern Priory Church between 1850 and 1893. Battison Haynes was a chorister at the church and deputized for his uncle on the organ. He went on to study with Franklin Taylor (piano) and Ebenezer Prout (harmony) at Oscar Beringer's Academy for the Higher Development of Pianoforte Playing, which had been founded in 1873. But in May 1878 Haynes enrolled at the Conservatory of Leipzig to study with Carl Reinecke and Salomon Jadassohn. While there he performed piano concertos by Beethoven, Moscheles and Mendelssohn at Conservatorium concerts. He returned to London in 1883 after six months living in Boulogne, where he occasionally played the organ at Boulogne Cathedral.

In 1884, Haynes was appointed organist at the then new St Philip Neri Church in Upper Sydenham. In 1890, he became Professor of Harmony and Composition at the Royal Academy of Music (at the time located at Tenterden Street, Hanover Square) where his best known students were Charles Macpherson and Harry Farjeon. In 1891, he also took on the post of organist and director of the choir at the Chapel Royal, Savoy, succeeding Henry Frost. For a while, Haynes was also director of music at Borough Polytechnic. As a composer, he was encouraged by Henry Littleton, the proprietor of music publishers Novello and Company from 1866 to 1888, and by his son and successor Alfred Littleton. Novello became his primary publisher. Haynes was also friendly with Sir Alexander Mackenzie, and transcribed a number of his works. At the time of his death in February 1900, aged just 40, Haynes was living in London at 5 Portman Street, Portman Square.

== Composition ==
While at Leipzig, Haynes composed a Violin Sonata, Piano Trio, Concert Overture, a Symphony in Bb, the Prelude and Fugue for Two Pianos (published as op 6 in 1882) and some songs. The most notable work during this period was his substantial, four movement Organ Sonata in D minor, which likely influenced the symphonic dimensions of Elgar’s Organ Sonata of 1895. The Vier Lieder, setting German texts in the lieder tradition, were composed just after his Leipzig period in 1885. They were recorded by Mark Wilde and David Owen Norris in 2019.

Haynes wrote vocal music for the church, for amateur and educational music making, and for the popular singers of the era. His services include three settings of the Magnificat and Nunc dimittis. Anthems include The Sun is Careering in Glory and Might (words by Mary Russell Mitford) and Awake up, My Glory (1891). There are two cantatas for female voices and recitation, tapping into demand from amateur ladies choirs: Fairies’ Isle (text by Edward Oxenford, 1888) and A Sea Dream (text by Shapcott Wensley, 1893). He continued to compose art songs, such as the Nine Elizabethan Lyrics (including No 4, Now is my Chloris which he also adapted as a part-song in 1898). But his rousing Irish Republican settings and folk song adaptions in ballad style were the most popular during his lifetime, and afterwards. Off to Philadelphia (1895, arranged for and sung by Harry Plunket Greene) and The Ould Plaid Shawl (1896) both became staples at the Henry Wood Proms in the decade following the composer’s death, and the tenor John McCormack famously revived Off to Philadelphia for a recording as late as 1941.

Other works include an Idyll for violin and orchestra (revived in 1985 by the Ulster Orchestra and broadcast by the BBC), and the Westwood orchestral gavotte (named after Henry Littleton’s palatial house in Sydenham). Haynes also made extended orchestral arrangements of Handel and Mozart. His chamber music includes the 12 Sketches for violin or cello and Three Dances (in canon throughout) for two violins and piano. Haynes also followed up his ambitious Organ Sonata with more works for organ, such as the Two Andantes, op 14, the Meditation in G (1897) and the Introduction and Variations on a Ground Bass.
