= The Village Organist =

Series of organ compositions by Novello and Co

"The Village Organist: a series of pieces for church and general use" was a sequence of books of organ music published by Novello and Co between 1870 and 1907.

== First series ==
The first series comprised two books. The first was published by Novello in 1870, described as:

[...] short easy voluntaries by eminent composers [...] edited by T. Richard Matthews B.A. Rector of St Nicholas church, North Coates, Great Grimsby [1826–1910] [...] Here are voluntaries by Professors Bennett and Ousley, Drs. Dykes, Stainer, Elvey, Chipp and Monk and Messrs Henry Smart, G. A. Macfarren, J. Barnby, E. H. Thorne and J. B. Calkin".

Apart from its thirty-nine voluntaries the first edition of the book also contained psalm chants and hymn tunes. (Later editions did not contain the psalm chants, which had been separately published by Novello as The Village Chant Book.)

A second "and concluding volume", also edited by T. R. Matthews, was published by Novello in 1872, issued in aid of the St Nicholas North Coates church organ fund. It claimed to contain works that were "all expressly composed for it and not published in any other work". It was favourably reviewed in The Musical Times of 1 August 1872 as a collection that "pleasantly exemplifies the present state of musicianship in England, and will be found valuable for practical use where short voluntaries are needed, in towns as much as in villages".

As recorded by a reviewer in The Musical Times of 1 August 1872, this volume contains works by:

- Dr Arnold
- Joseph Barnby
- J. P. Barnett
- Julius Benedict
- W. H. Calcott
- W. G. Cusins
- M. Delaborde
- Henry Farmer
- R. Forsey Brion
- Dr Gauntlett
- Mrs Mouncy Bartholomew
- F. E. Gladstone
- C. Goodban
- John Hullah
- H. S. Irons
- G. A. Macfarren
- Dr E. G. Monk
- Franz Nava (Pseudonym of E F Rimbault)]
- S. Reay
- Dr Rimbault
- E. Silva
- Henry Smart
- Stainer
- E. H. Turpin
- C. G. Verrinder
- Dr Wesley
- extracts of work by Beethoven, Mozart and Onslow

From 1877 both books were available combined into a "New edition, complete in One Volume, 142 pages".

== Second series ==
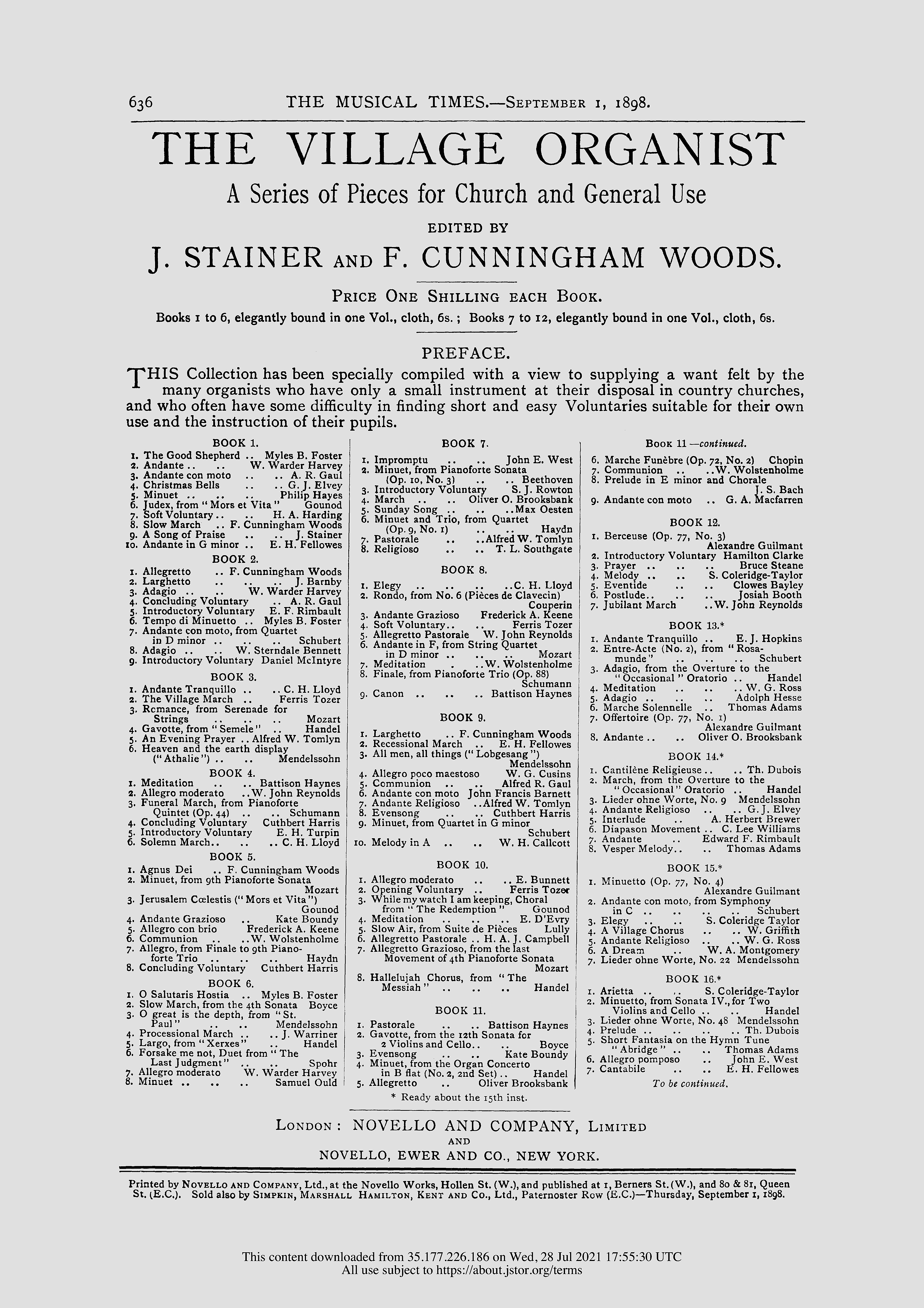
A 'highlights' contents list for 'The Village Organist' Volumes 1-16

The Musical Times of 1 March 1897 advertised the first six volumes of a new series of organ music, also called The Village Organist and also published by Novello. The editors were John Stainer and F. Cunnigham Woods, who noted that they "have eneavoured to bring together a collection of pieces ... simple, without being uninteresting and effective where the instrumental resources are limited". Each volume was priced at one shilling.

Following Stainer's death in 1901 the series was edited by Cunningham Woods alone, starting with the March 1903 publication and covering books 32–43. Editorship was then taken up by John E. West starting with the February 1907 publication and covering books 44–48.

- Books 1, 2, 3, 4, 5 and 6 were advertised in The Musical Times of 1 March 1897.
- Books 7, 8, and 9 were advertised in The Musical Times of 1 September 1897.
- Books 10, 11, and 12 were advertised in The Musical Times of 1 February 1898
- Books 13, 14, 15, 16 were advertised in The Musical Times of 1 September 1898.
- Books 17 (Wedding Music) and 18 (Funeral Music) were advertised in The Musical Times of 1 April 1899
- Books 19, 20, and 21 were advertised in The Musical Times of 1 January 1900.
- Books 22, 23 and 24 were advertised in The Musical Times of 1 July 1900.
- Books 25, 26, 27, 28, 29 and 30 were reviewed in The Musical Times of 1 March 1902.
- Book 31 (Coronation Number) was advertised in The Musical Times of 1 April 1902.
- Books 32, 33 and 34 were advertised in The Musical Times of 1 March 1903.
- Books 35 and 36 were advertised in The Musical Times of 1 November 1903.
- Books 37 (Funeral Music), 38 and 39 were advertised in The Musical Times of 1 September 1905.
- Book 40 was advertised in The Musical Times of 1 January 1906,
- Books 41 and 42 were advertised in The Musical Times of 1 March 1906.
- Book 43 (Harvest Festivals) was advertised in The Musical Times of 1 September 1906.
- Book 44 (Lent and Holy Week) was advertised in The Musical Times of 1 February 1907.
- Book 45
- Book 46 (Various seasons of the church) was advertised in The Musical Times of 1 October 1907.
- Books 47 (Special Occasions) and 48 (Christmas) were advertised in The Musical Times of 1 December 1907.

The separate books were subsequently collected into a series of volumes:

- Volume I: books 1–6
- Volume II: books 7–12
- Volume III: books 13-18
- Volume IV:: books 19–24
- Volume V: books 25–30
- Volume VI: books 31–36
- Volume VII: books 37–42
- Volume VIII: books 43–48
