= The Crucifixion (Stainer) =

1887 oratorio by John Stainer

- Oratorio by John Stainer
- Cover of the 1951 Novello Edition
- Text: W J Sparrow Simpson
- Composed: 1887
- Movements: 20
- Vocal: SATB choir and solo

Premiere
- Date: 24 February 1887

The Crucifixion: A Meditation on the Sacred Passion of the Holy Redeemer is an oratorio for a SATB choir and organ composed by John Stainer in 1887, with text by W J Sparrow Simpson. The piece relates the Biblical narrative of the Passion and Crucifixion of Jesus. It is particularly noted for the Christian hymn “All for Jesus, All for Jesus".

== Composition ==
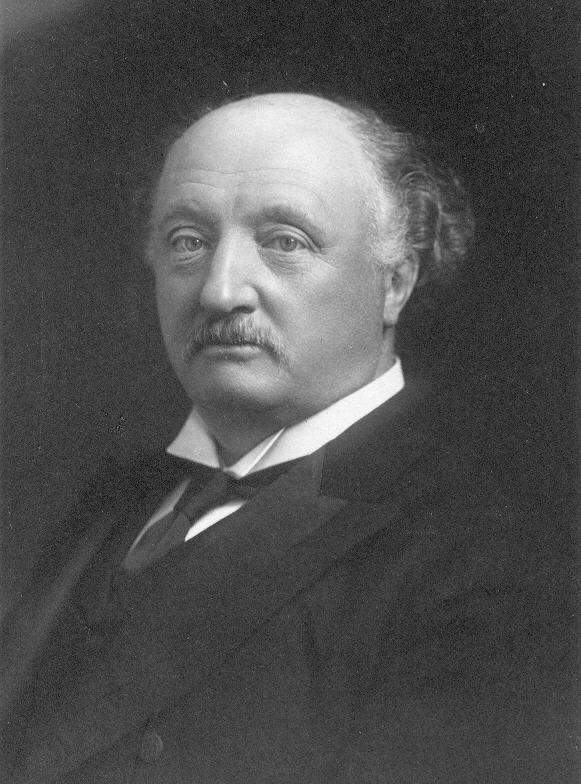
Composer Sir John Stainer

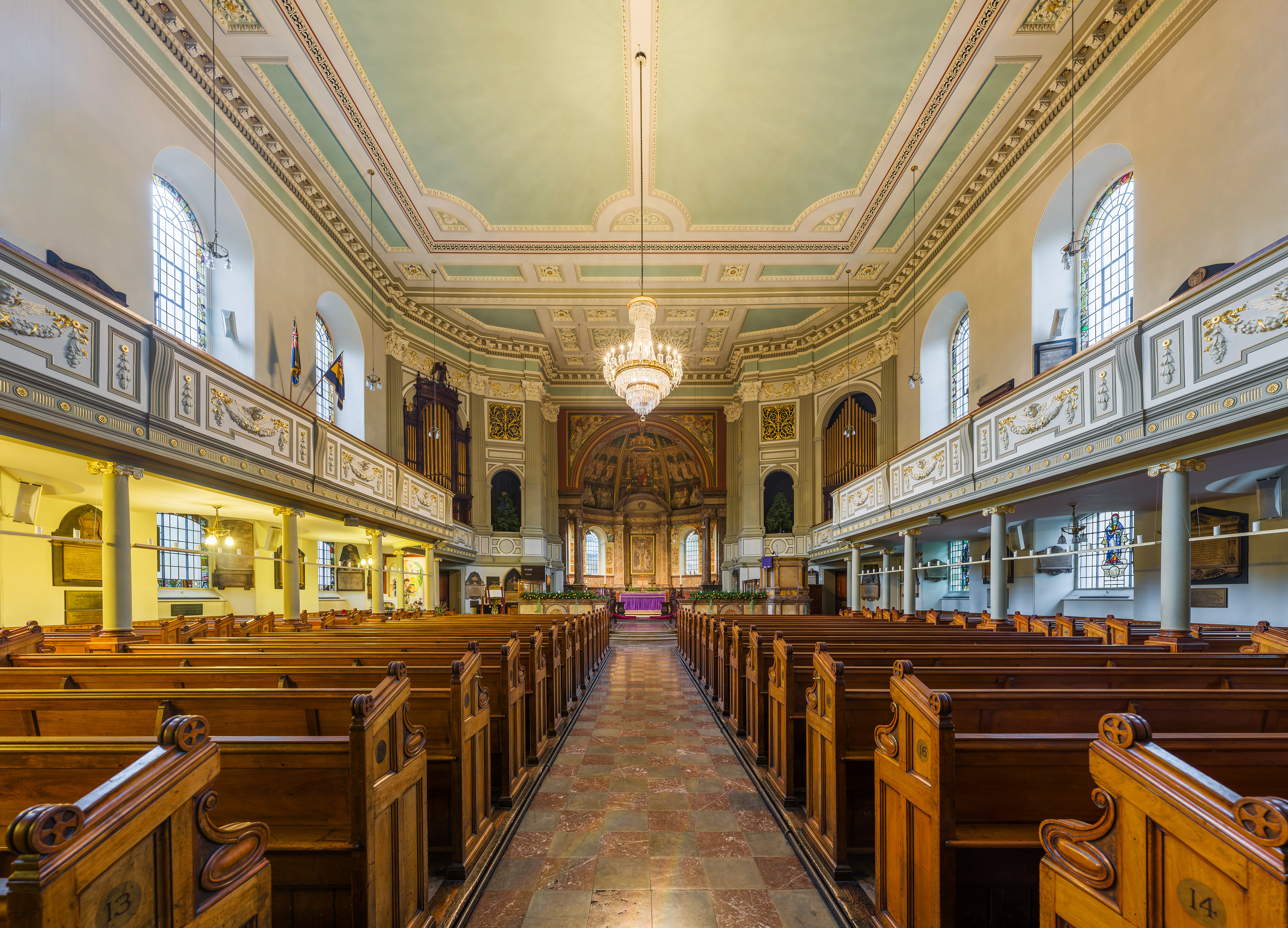
The Crucifixion was first performed in St Marylebone Parish Church in London

The Crucifixion is scored for a SATB choir and organ, and features solos for bass (or baritone) and tenor. Structurally, it is based on the traditional format of the Passions by Johann Sebastian Bach, with a Biblical narrative interspersed with choruses, solos and hymns reflecting on the Passion story. Stainer intended the piece to be within the scope of most parish church choirs; it includes five hymns for congregational participation.

The text consists of extracts from the King James Bible with poetic material written by W. J. Sparrow Simpson, the librettist of Stainer's earlier cantata Mary Magdalene. The work is dedicated "to my pupil and friend W. Hodge and the choir of Marylebone Church", who first performed it on 24 February 1887, the day after Ash Wednesday. There have been performances in Marylebone Church annually since then.

The work premiered on 24 February 1887 and continues to be performed today.

== Structure ==
Chorus: God so loved the world
The chorus, God so loved the world, which is often sung as a stand-alone anthem

Hymn: All for Jesus
The final hymn of the work, All for Jesus

The oratorio consists of the following movements:

1. And They Came to a Place Named Gethsemane (tenor recitative) – text from Mark 14:32
2. The Agony (tenor and bass solo and chorus) – including text from Mark 14:46, 53, 60, 61–64, 15:1, 15–16
3. Processional to Calvary (organ solo) and "Fling Wide the Gates" (chorus and tenor solo)
4. And When They Were Come (bass recitative) – text from Luke 23:33
5. The Mystery of the Divine Humiliation (hymn)
6. He Made Himself of No Reputation (bass recitative) – text from Philippians 2:7–8
7. The Majesty of the Divine Humiliation tenor solo
8. And As Moses Lifted Up the Serpent (bass recitative) – text from John 3:14–15
9. God So Loved the World (chorus or quartet a cappella) – text from John 3:16–17
10. Litany of the Passion (hymn)
11. Jesus Said, 'Father, Forgive Them' (tenor and male chorus recitative) – text from Luke 23:34
12. So Thou Liftest Thy Divine Petition (tenor and bass solo duet)
13. The Mystery of the Intercession (hymn)
14. And One of the Malefactors (bass solo and male chorus) – text from Luke 23:39–43
15. The Adoration of the Crucified (hymn)
16. When Jesus Therefore, Saw His Mother (tenor solo and male chorus) – text from John 19:26–27, Matthew 27:45, Mark 15:34
17. Is It Nothing to You? (bass solo) – text from Lamentations 1:12
18. The Appeal of the Crucified (chorus)
19. After This, Jesus Knowing That All Things Were Now Accomplished (tenor and male chorus recitative) – text from John 19:28, 30, Luke 23:46
20. For the Love of Jesus (hymn)

== Critical opinion ==
Several critics have expressed unfavourable opinions of Stainer's Crucifixion. The composer Ernest Walker dismissed the work, writing in 1924 that "Musicians today have no use for The Crucifixion". Edmund Fellowes said: "It suffers primarily from the extreme poverty, not to say triviality, of the musical ideas dealing with a subject which should make the highest demand for dignity of treatment". Kenneth Long said that Stainer had a libretto "which for sheer banality and naïveté would be hard to beat". Stainer himself characterised his work as "rubbish". In his A Short History of English Church Music, Erik Routley traced The Crucifixion as the archetypal work that others imitated, and often diluted.

"Much of the rest of [Stainer's] music and the whole of [his] libretto where it is not quoting scripture, is a caricature of the sensational triviality which, no matter how great the efforts of their latter day defenders, we are bound to attribute to the Victorians. From The Crucifixion you go down into the underworld of Michael Costa, Caleb Simper and J.H. Maunder (the last two of whom prompted Vaughan Williams once to enliven one of his pugnacious comments about all this with the phrase 'composers with ridiculous names': their names are about the one thing these composers couldn't help; other aspects of their activities are less innocent)."

Other critics have viewed Stainer's work more sympathetically. Theologian Louise Joy Lawrence argues that, once the listener has set aside relative cultural views of Victorian "vulgarity", The Crucifixion serves well as a spiritual vehicle for conveying "theology and scripture at its most profound", and the melodies "as tools of glorification for God".

Howard E. Smither describes the piece as "the most important English work on the Passion". He observes that structurally the work owes much to J.S. Bach's repertoire of Passions, and also notes its popularity for Passiontide church performances throughout the English-speaking world.

Reviewing a recording of The Crucifixion in Gramophone, musicologist Jeremy Dibble referred to the piece's "rich, chromatic harmony", asserting that any accusations of "saccharine sentimentality" could be allayed by a sincere performance. He singled out the series of hymns for particular praise:

"Much of the mystical spirit of The Crucifixion is derived from its Tractarian heritage and, more to the point, from the treasure-trove of the mid-Victorian hymn repertoire, so characteristic for its colourful, devotional harmonic language. Stainer’s hymns – all winners – are full of such vibrant artistry."

== Contribution to hymnody ==
Stainer's Crucifixion has contributed two popular hymn tunes to the repertoire of Christian hymnody: "Cross of Jesus, Cross of Sorrow" appears in hymnals and the tune is used as the setting for the hymns "Come, Thou Long Expected Jesus" and "There's a Wideness in God's Mercy". The final hymn in The Crucifixion, "For the Love of Jesus" also appears in modern hymnals; the hymn and its tune are both known by the first line, "All for Jesus, All for Jesus".

== Recordings ==
The oratorio has been recorded several times; the first complete and best-known recording of The Crucifixion was issued by RCA Victor in 1930 and features the Trinity Choir with Richard Crooks (tenor), Lawrence Tibbett (baritone) and Mark Andrews (organ)

Other notable recordings include:

- Music for Pleasure, 1968
  Guildford Cathedral Choir with David Hughes (tenor), John Lawrenson (bass) and Gavin Williams (organ), conducted by Barry Rose
- Herald, 2016
  the Choir of St. Marylebone Parish Church with Mark Wilde (tenor), Graham Trew (baritone), Thomas Allery (organ), conducted by Gavin Roberts
- Signum, 2010
  Huddersfield Choral Society with Andrew Kennedy (tenor), Neal Davies (bass) and Darius Battiwalla (organ), conducted by Joseph Cullen
- Delphian Records, 2024
  The Choir of St Mary's Cathedral, Edinburgh (Episcopal) with Liam Bonthrone (tenor), Arthur Bruce (baritone) and Imogen Morgan (organ), conducted by Duncan Ferguson
