= North Cotes =

Village and civil parish in the East Lindsey district of Lincolnshire, England

Coordinates: 53.480780°N 0.029749°E

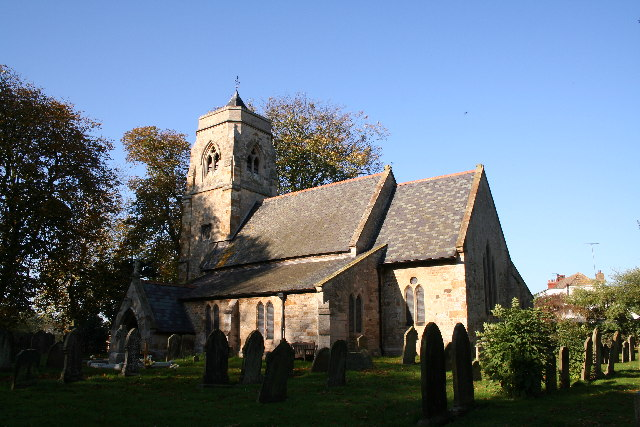
- St Nicholas' Church, North Coates

- Location within Lincolnshire
- Population: 724 (2011)
- OS grid reference: TA347001
  - London: 135 mi (217 km) S
- Civil parish: North Cotes
- District: East Lindsey
- Shire county: Lincolnshire
- Region: East Midlands
- Country: England
- Sovereign state: United Kingdom
- Post town: Grimsby
- Postcode district: DN36
- Police: Lincolnshire
- Fire: Lincolnshire
- Ambulance: East Midlands
- UK Parliament: Louth and Horncastle

North Cotes or North Coates is a village and civil parish in the East Lindsey district of Lincolnshire, England. It is situated close to the coast, 4 miles (6 km) to the east, and 10 miles (16 km) north-east from the town of Louth. In 2011 the parish had a population of 724.

== Notable buildings ==
=== St Nicholas church ===
The Grade II* listed church is dedicated to Saint Nicholas and is built of limestone, dating from the thirteenth century, although mostly rebuilt in 1865 by James Fowler of Louth. The upper part of the font is twelfth-century and the lower part nineteenth-century. There is a medieval scheduled standing cross with square base in St Nicholas churchyard, believed to be in its original position.

=== Ivy Cottage ===
Ivy Cottage, in the village, is a Grade II* listed building dating from the early eighteenth century which is unaltered and in its original condition.

=== RAF North Coates ===
RAF North Coates was opened during the First World War, and closed in June 1919. It reopened in 1927 as an Armament Practice Camp, and during the Second World War was operated by Coastal Command. After the war it was home to several maintenance units, but in 1963 it to become Britain's first Bloodhound surface-to-air missile site. It was closed in 1990. From 1992 various sections of the airfield and buildings were sold off. It is now home to the North Coates Flying Club.

== Notable residents ==
Rev. Timothy Richard Matthews (1826–1910) was North Cotes' curate-in-charge from 1859, and rector from 1869 to 1907. He was an enthusiastic amateur musician with a keen interest in composing church music. He published many hymn tunes, including the tunes "North Coates" and "Ludborough". He compiled The North Coates Supplemental Tune Book (1883, rev. 1899). He commissioned two volumes of newly composed organ music called The Village Organist (1870, 1872) that were sold to raise funds for the North Coates organ fund.
