= John Stainer =

English composer (1840–1901)

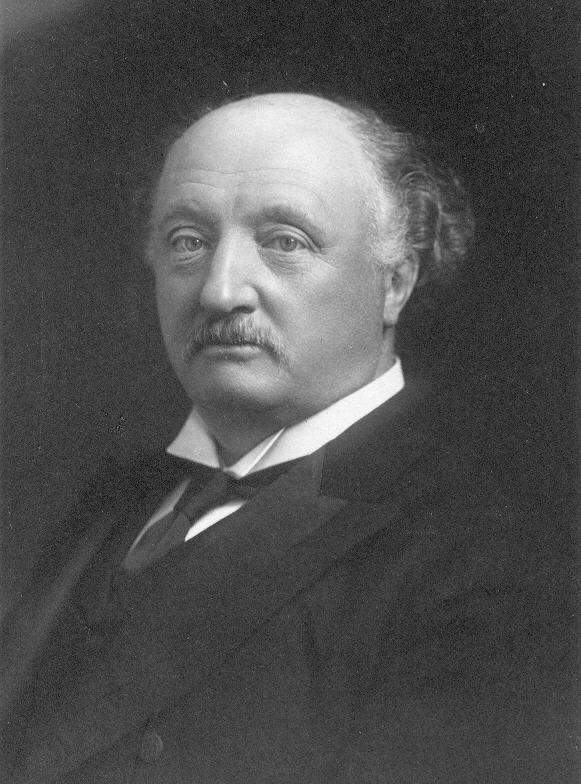
Sir John Stainer

Sir John Stainer (6 June 1840 – 31 March 1901) was an English composer and organist whose music, though seldom performed today (with the exception of The Crucifixion, still heard at Passiontide in some Anglican churches), was very popular during his lifetime. His work as choir trainer and organist set standards for Anglican church music that are still influential. He was also active as an academic, becoming Heather Professor of Music at Oxford.

Stainer was born in Southwark, London, in 1840, the son of a schoolmaster. He became a chorister at St Paul's Cathedral when aged ten and was appointed to the position of organist at St Michael's College, Tenbury, at the age of sixteen. He later became organist at Magdalen College, Oxford, and subsequently organist at St Paul's Cathedral. When he retired owing to his poor eyesight and deteriorating health, he returned to Oxford to become Professor of Music at the university. He died unexpectedly while on holiday in Italy in 1901.

== Early years ==
John Stainer was the eighth of nine children born to William Stainer and his wife Ann (née Collier) on 6 June 1840. At least three of the children died in infancy, and John was much younger than his brother, William, and his three sisters, Ann, Sarah, and Mary. The family lived in Southwark, London, where his father joined his brother in his cabinet making business, later becoming a vestry clerk and registrar of births, and a parish schoolmaster. He was also an untaught musician and player of the piano, violin, and flute. He built a small chamber organ at home on which the precocious John used to accompany him when he played hymn tunes on the violin. His sister Ann also used it – she was the regular organist at Magdalen Hospital, Streatham. It was a happy family, and young John seems to have been spoiled by his elders. He could play Bach's Fugue in E major at the age of seven.

In 1849, after a year's probation, young Stainer became a chorister at St Paul's Cathedral. He was already an accomplished player on keyboard instruments and possessed perfect pitch and a fine treble voice, and soon became the choir's principal soloist.

In 1854, he was invited to sing in the first English performance of Bach's St Matthew Passion under William Sterndale Bennett at the Hanover Square Rooms. He travelled each day between his home in Streatham and the cathedral by steamboat. The choristers were required to sing for services at 9:30 a.m. and 3:15 p.m. In between these times, the choristers were instructed in Latin, arithmetic, writing and other subjects, and Stainer probably received a much better education there than he would have done had he been educated at the local elementary school. A house in the cathedral's present choir school has since been named after him. He received organ lessons at St Sepulchre's Church, Holborn from George Cooper, assistant organist at St Paul's Cathedral under John Goss. At this time, he might have met future composer Arthur Sullivan, his junior by two years. Certainly, the two young men later became friends and undertook activities together on half-holidays.

In 1855, he was offered a six-month contract as organist at St Benet's, Paul's Wharf. He proved successful, and his contract was renewed several times for further six-month terms. As he was still a minor, his salary of £30 per year was paid to his father. During this period, he sometimes deputised for the regular organists, Goss and Cooper, at services in St Paul's Cathedral.

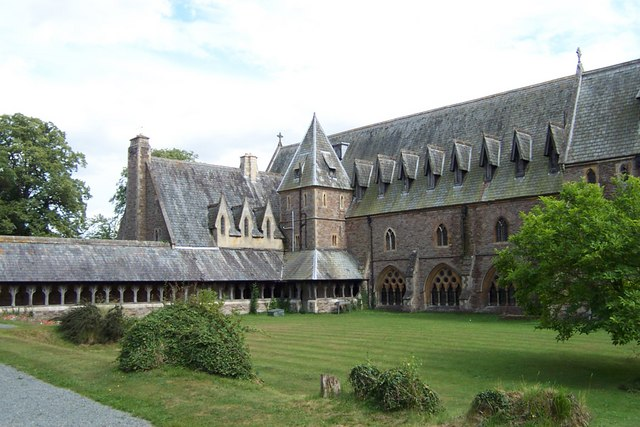
St Michael's College, Tenbury

At the age of sixteen, Stainer was appointed by Sir Frederick Ouseley to the post of organist at the newly founded St Michael's College, Tenbury. Ouseley was Heather Professor of Music at Oxford University and had recently become vicar of St Michael's College on the outskirts of Tenbury Wells, a choir school with a church that he had founded and endowed and which was intended to serve as a model for Anglican church music. Although Stainer was not much older than the choristers were, Stainer was put in charge of them. One of his duties was to give piano lessons to the boys for two hours a day.

Ouseley was an antiquarian and had an extensive library. He was very interested in the history of music and acted as Stainer's mentor. Under his guidance, Stainer became the youngest ever successful candidate for the Bachelor of Music degree at Oxford. For this, Stainer wrote a cantata, Praise the Lord, O my soul, with text from Psalm 103. Its traditional style was designed to appeal to the examining board and sounds stilted when set against his later works. About this time, he wrote several anthems, the most successful of which was I saw the Lord, a bolder and more original work in a more contemporary idiom.

== Magdalen College ==
In 1860, he became organist at Magdalen College, Oxford, initially for a period of six months, at a salary of £120 per year. His duties included playing for services, training the choir, and leading them on Fridays, a day on which the organ was not used. A new organ had been installed five years earlier that was ideal for developing his talent. He proved satisfactory in the post, and his contract was made permanent. He was permitted to study for a degree as long as it did not interfere with his duties, and he chose to do so in the expectation that it would raise his social status and studied at St Edmund Hall. He gained his BA in 1864 and his MA two years later and was keen to proceed to his Mus Doc, which would raise his standing within the university.

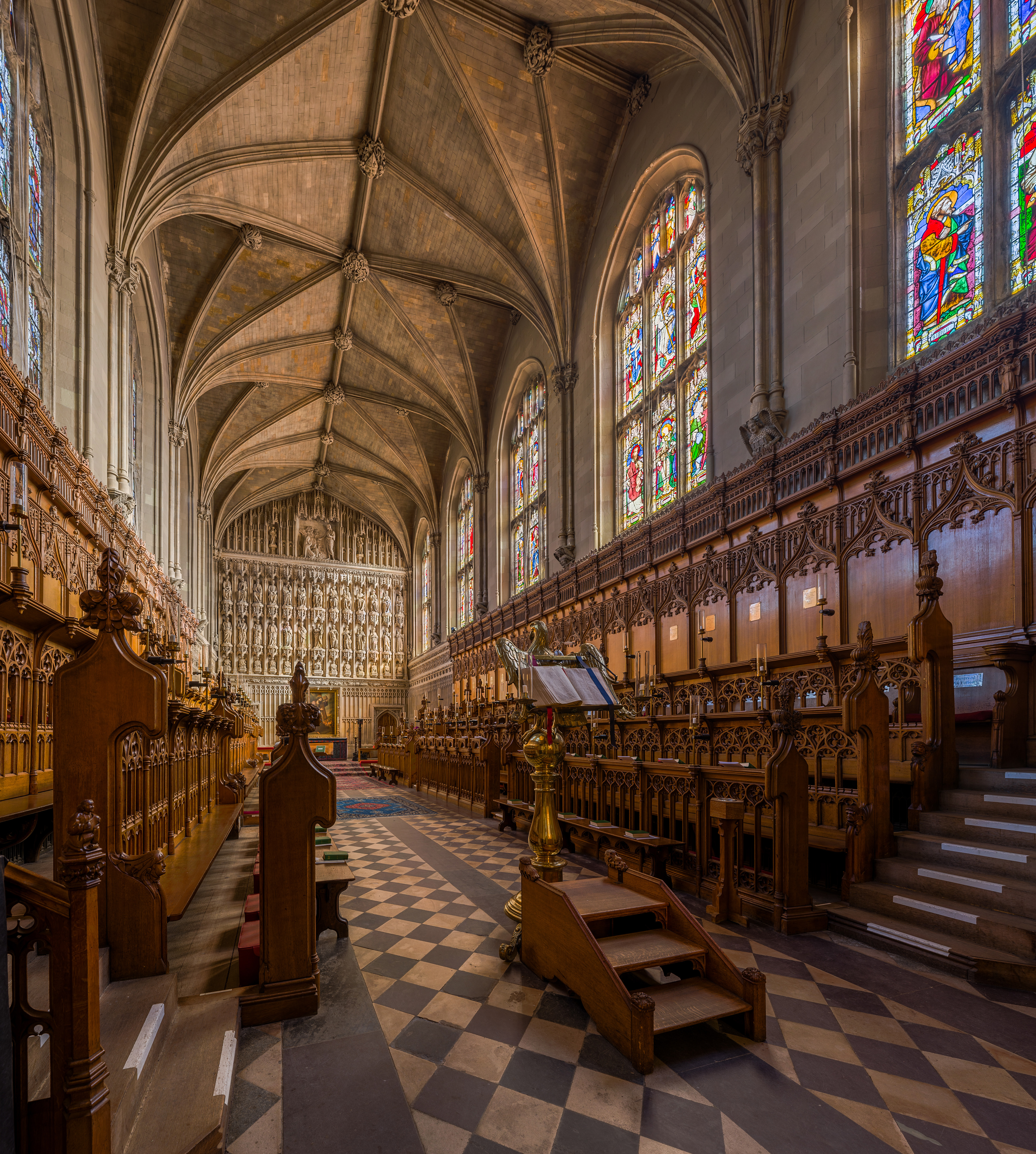
Interior of Magdalen College Chapel

Unfailingly conscientious as a choirmaster, Stainer introduced new anthems and service music, bringing the choir to a higher level of attainment than it had previously seen. It had been the custom for the adult choir members, the lay clerks, not to attend practice at all, but Stainer had a magnetic personality and persuaded them to come. Their more regular attendance enabled the repertoire to be enlarged. Stainer's skill on the organ was much respected, and he was regarded as "the finest organist Oxford had seen in many generations". The vice chancellor, Francis Jeune, was an admirer and in 1861 appointed Stainer to the prestigious post of University Organist at the University Church of St Mary the Virgin. Here he was expected to play for a service every Sunday (at a later time in the morning than the Magdalen service).

At this time, he was composing liturgical music and developing his musical style. There were several anthems and two more technically assured multi-sectioned verse anthems, "Drop down, ye heavens from above" and "They were lovely and pleasant in their lives". His routine included two services daily, rehearsals, lectures, tutorials, attendance at Ouseley's lectures, and visits home to Southwark in the vacations. He must have performed his duties with diligence as his salary was raised by £10 a year and, after 1862, he received an allowance towards his rent.

Stainer was also conductor of the Magdalen Madrigal Society, which gave concerts in the College Hall, and the Magdalen Vagabonds, which performed during vacations. The latter gave concerts in various towns and cities and raised money for church restoration. He wrote some madrigals himself, which were published by Novello, a company with which he was to do much future business. He also wrote an oratorio, Gideon, as the exercise for his doctorate and it was performed in November 1865. It was well received on the day and was sufficient to gain him his doctorate, but has not been performed since.

After Stainer had obtained his doctorate, Ouseley enrolled him as an examiner for Oxford musical degrees. In this capacity, Stainer met and later became friends with Hubert Parry. Attending at evensong at Magdalen College in 1866, Parry wrote in his diary "Stainer played the last 3 movements of the Sonata in B♭ (Mendelssohn) afterwards most gloriously". He examined William Pole and Frederick Bridge and became involved in organ and music tuition and wider musical activities. He had considerable influence on sacred music in Oxford, and his reputation spread beyond the confines of the city. He was employed to play solo organ works at weekly concerts at Crystal Palace and took part regularly in the Three Choirs Festival.

Stainer was interested in the history of music and traditional folk songs. He encouraged contralto, composer, and festival organizer Mary Augusta Wakefield, who shared this interest. There was a revived interest in carols at the time, and he rediscovered old carols, provided new settings for others, and introduced contemporary works. Many of his harmonisations are still in use today. He published a volume Christmas Carols New and Old which was a considerable success, with thousands of copies sold. He followed this up with another edition the following year to which he persuaded Arthur Sullivan to contribute. He also composed several hymn tunes, and some of these are still to be found in Anglican hymnals, with "Love divine, all loves excelling" being popular at wedding services. Other parish music followed with a congregational Te Deum in C which was regularly sung at Magdalen on Sundays and a verse anthem "Sing a song of praise". Two more substantial anthems, intended for use in cathedrals, were "Lead kindly light" composed in 1868, followed by "Awake, awake, put on thy strength" in 1871. He also produced two evening canticles and a comprehensive set of music for morning, communion, and evening services. He had also been working for a long time on his first theoretical work, A Theory of Harmony Founded on the Tempered Scale, published by Novello in 1871.

== St Paul's Cathedral ==
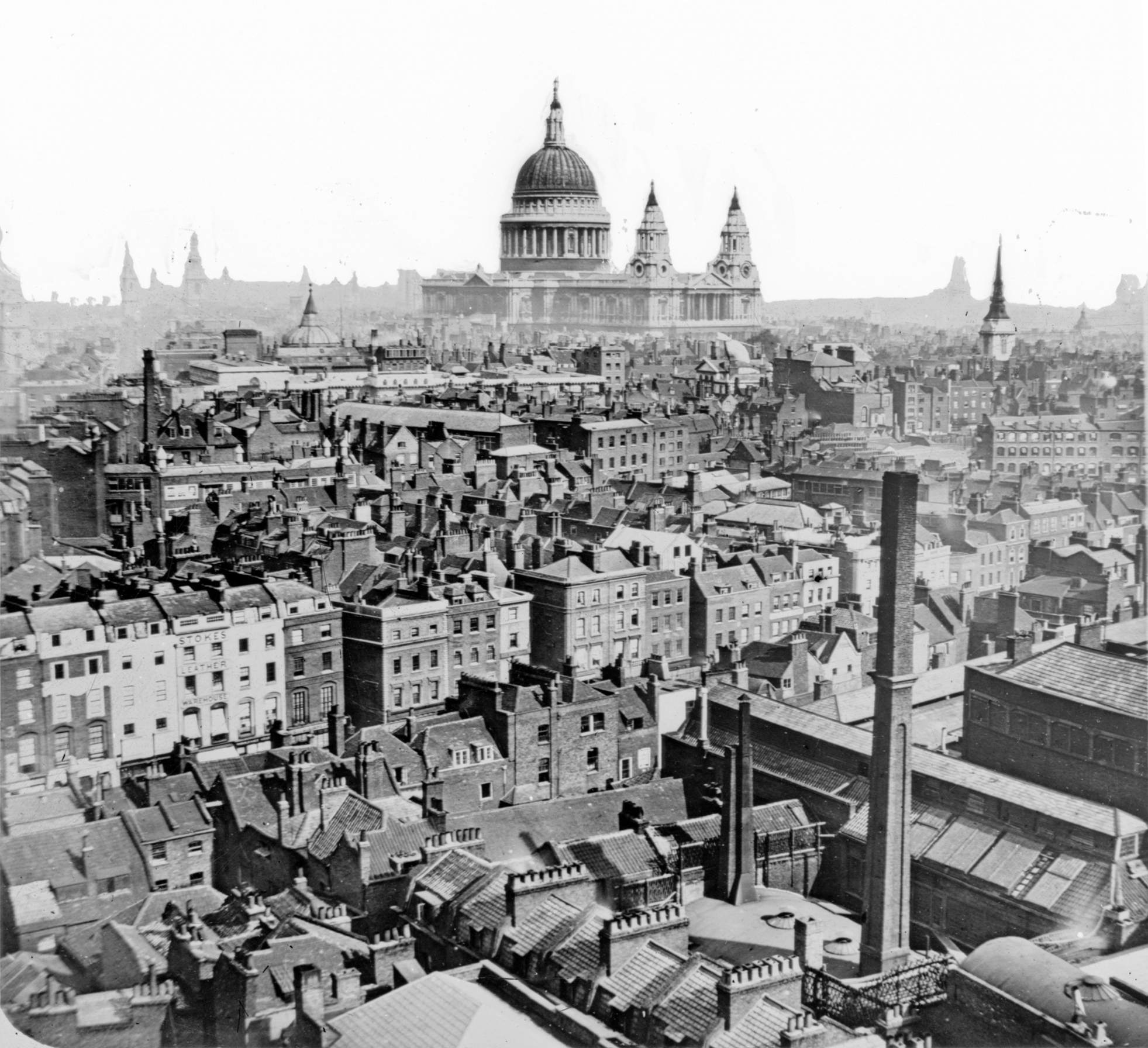
St Paul's Cathedral at about the time Stainer was organist

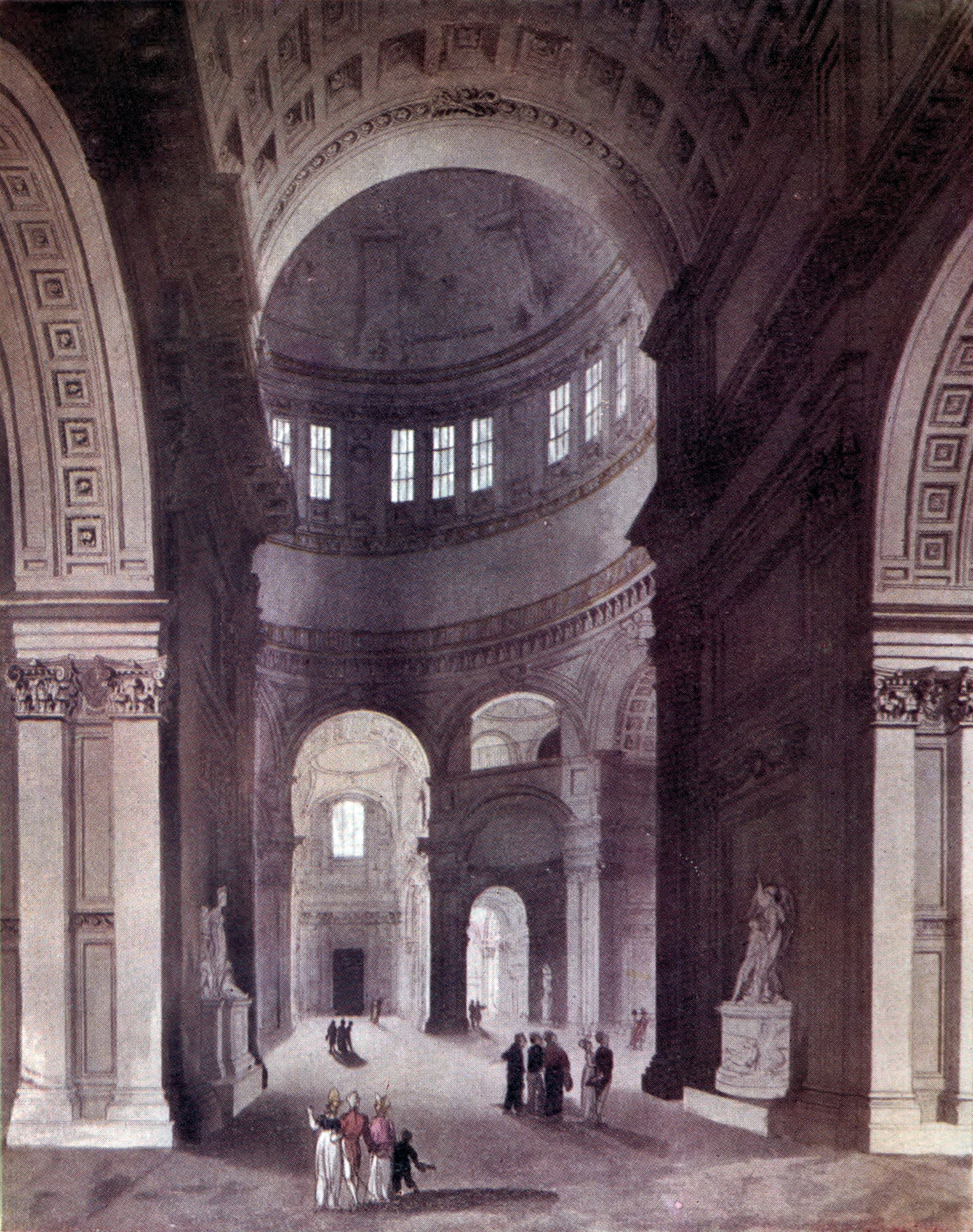
Engraving of the interior of St Paul's Cathedral

In 1871, Goss resigned as organist of St Paul's Cathedral, and Stainer was appointed to the position early in 1872 at a salary of £400 per annum. By this time, he had been married for seven years and had five children with another due shortly. The organ was in the process of being rebuilt, by the organ builder Henry Willis to Stainer's design, with portions on either side of the entrance to the choir stalls. Around this time he was asked to help revise Hymns Ancient and Modern, a task he did with enthusiasm. At St Paul's, he soon set about reinvigorating the choir. The appointment of vicars choral was for life, and the tenor and bass voices saw no need for rehearsal, meaning that the repertoire was static. Stainer was able to change their attitude, and new anthems and liturgies were introduced, a choir school was built, and the number of choristers increased from twelve to thirty-five. When William Sparrow Simpson was appointed Succentor, the raising of standards continued, and St Paul's Cathedral became the focus of religious ceremony in the capital, including state occasions, ceremonial events, memorial services, and the funerals of the great and famous. A peal of twelve bells was installed in 1878.

Further appointments followed. Stainer became an honorary fellow of the Royal Academy of Music in 1877 and an examiner for the Doctor of Music degree at Cambridge and London Universities. He accepted the post of musical director of the Madrigal Society of London. He was particularly honoured to be asked to be a juror at the French Exhibition in Paris in 1878 and in 1880 was an adjudicator at the Welsh Eisteddfod at Caernarvon. He was made Chevalier of the Legion of Honour in 1879.

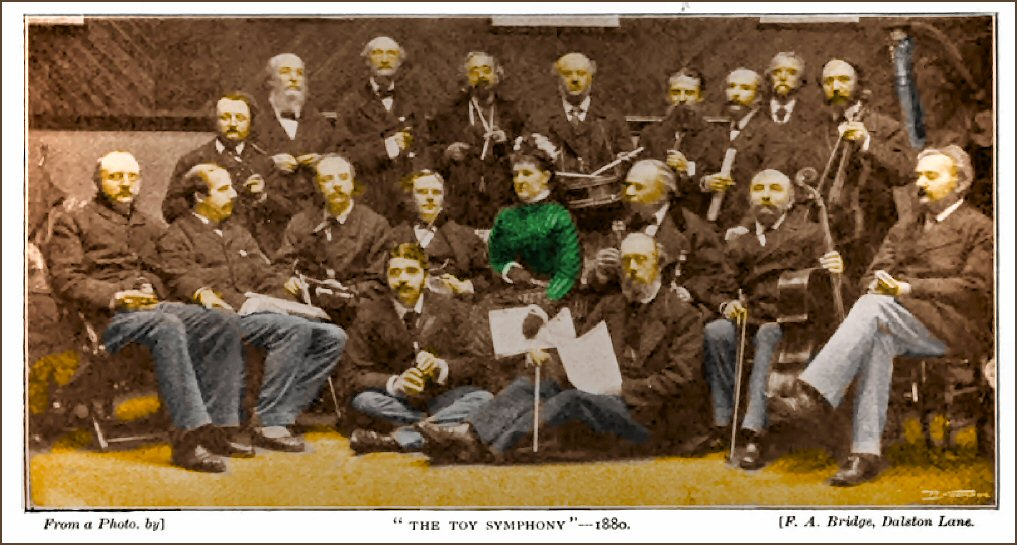
Group of musicians (including John Stainer) that performed Haydn's Toy Symphony at St James Hall, on behalf of a charity, 1880 - Sir Arthur Sullivan is on the first row sitting on the floor.

In 1882, Stainer was offered the post of Inspector of Music in Schools and Colleges, a position he took with great seriousness and which he occupied for six years. His assistant was William Gray McNaught. Together they worked towards raising standards in music teaching and toured the country, visiting schools and colleges and examining candidates. Stainer advocated the use of musical notation and tonic sol-fa rather than the learning-by-ear method previously used. He was by now treated with the greatest respect in musical circles, but his many activities diminished the time available for composition. The flow of new anthems and service music slowed down, but in 1883, he completed his oratorio Mary Magdalen. This was followed in 1887 by The Crucifixion, the work for which he is most remembered.

In 1885, he was awarded an honorary degree by Durham University, and he became Heather Professor at Oxford in 1889 following the death of Ouseley. He conducted pioneering research into early music, notably the output of Netherlandish Renaissance composer Guillaume Du Fay and Gilles Binchois, then scarcely known even among experts. He also contributed a small treatise, Harmony, and another, Composition, to the famous series of Novello musical primers. For budding organists, he wrote a primer called, simply, The Organ, which continues to have a following. In recognition of his services to British music, he received a knighthood from Queen Victoria in 1888.

== Retirement ==
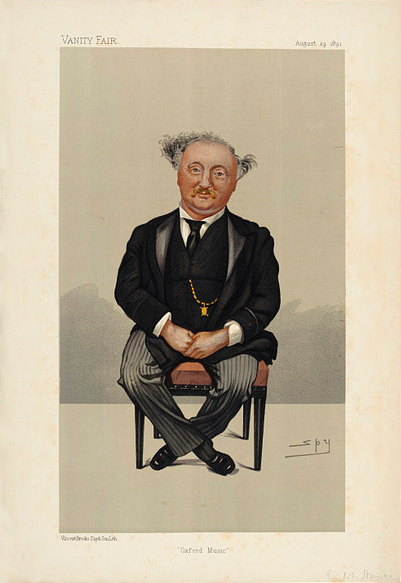
Caricature published in Vanity Fair in 1891

Following a childhood accident, Stainer had lost the use of one eye. There is some confusion about this, and he may merely have had a lazy eye, but for a brief period in 1875, he feared he was losing the sight of the other eye. This proved not to be the case, but he suffered from eye strain and impairment to his vision for much of his life. This was a major reason for his decision to retire from St Paul's Cathedral in 1888, while still in his forties. As Bumpus was to write, "Such honours as are at the disposal of his fellow musicians have been freely showered upon him, for he is universally beloved and esteemed, but his many onerous duties, his organistship of this, his presidency of that, and his incessant hard work as an examiner, have all involved responsibility and constant application, and the result is that his sight and general health have given way under the severe strain of sheer hard work."

In later life, he and his wife took to travelling to the Riviera, Florence or Mentone each year for him to relax and recuperate. It was on such a visit to Verona, Italy, that on Palm Sunday, 31 March 1901, he felt unwell and retired to his room. Later that afternoon, he died of a heart attack. He was sixty. His body was taken back to England, and his funeral service was held on 6 April at St Cross Church, Oxford with a large number of friends and colleagues present, followed by burial in adjacent Holywell Cemetery.

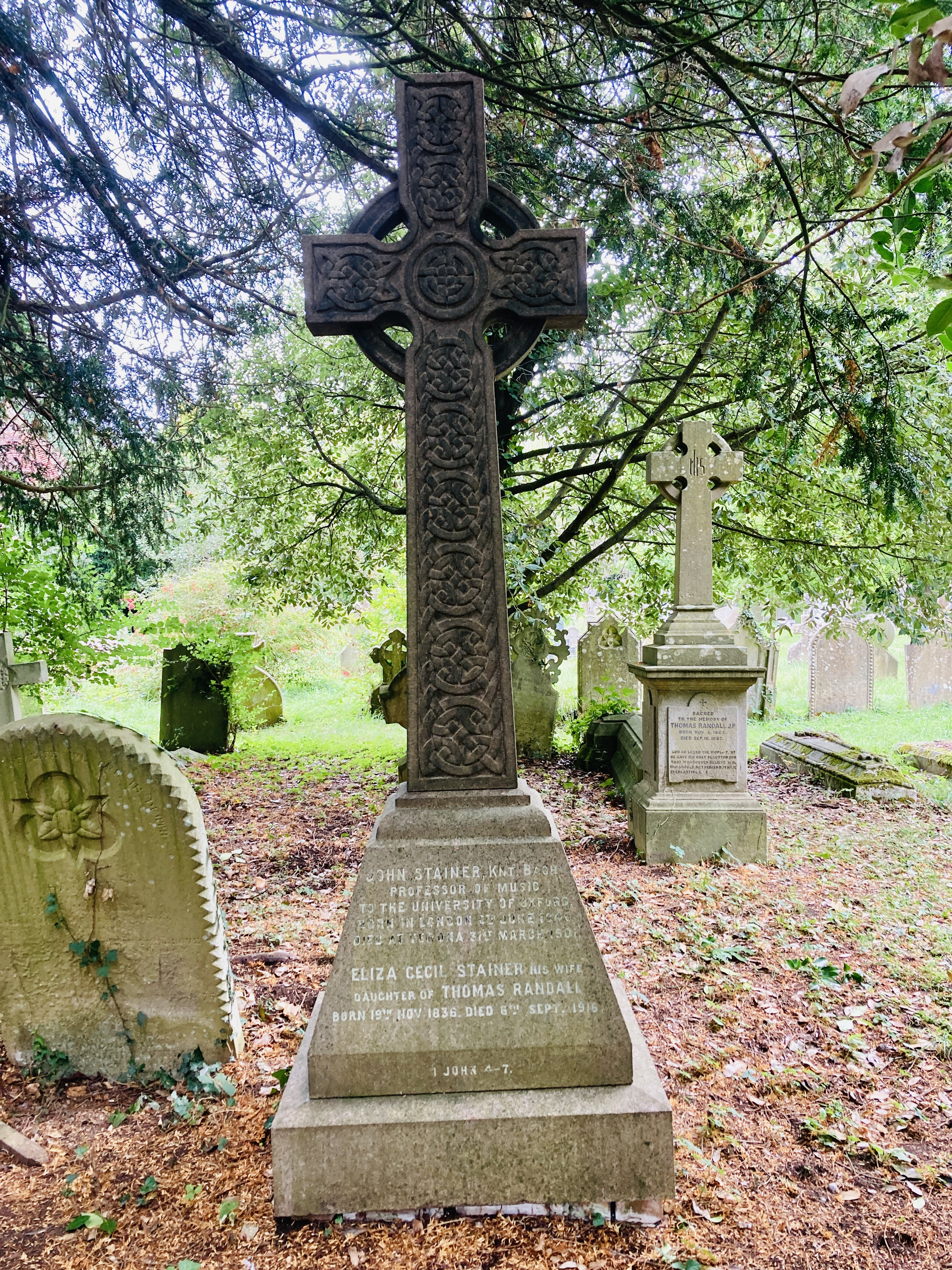
The grave of Sir John Stainer in Holywell Cemetery in Oxford in 2024

Lady Stainer was devastated by his death and went into mourning for a year, but as she confided to a friend, the pianist Francesco Berger, "I am thankful he has been spared long illness and the weariness of old age, which he always dreaded". She gave a memorial stained glass window to St Cross Church and arranged for a monument to be erected at Magdalen College. Her husband's valuable library of antiquarian music books passed to his elder son, J F R Stainer, who allowed its use for study and research purposes. The collection was sold to an American collector in 1932 who, on his death in 1973, had it bequeathed to the Bodleian Library, where it remains. Lady Stainer died in 1916 leaving six children. She is buried in Holywell Cemetery, Oxford, beside her husband.

== Legacy ==
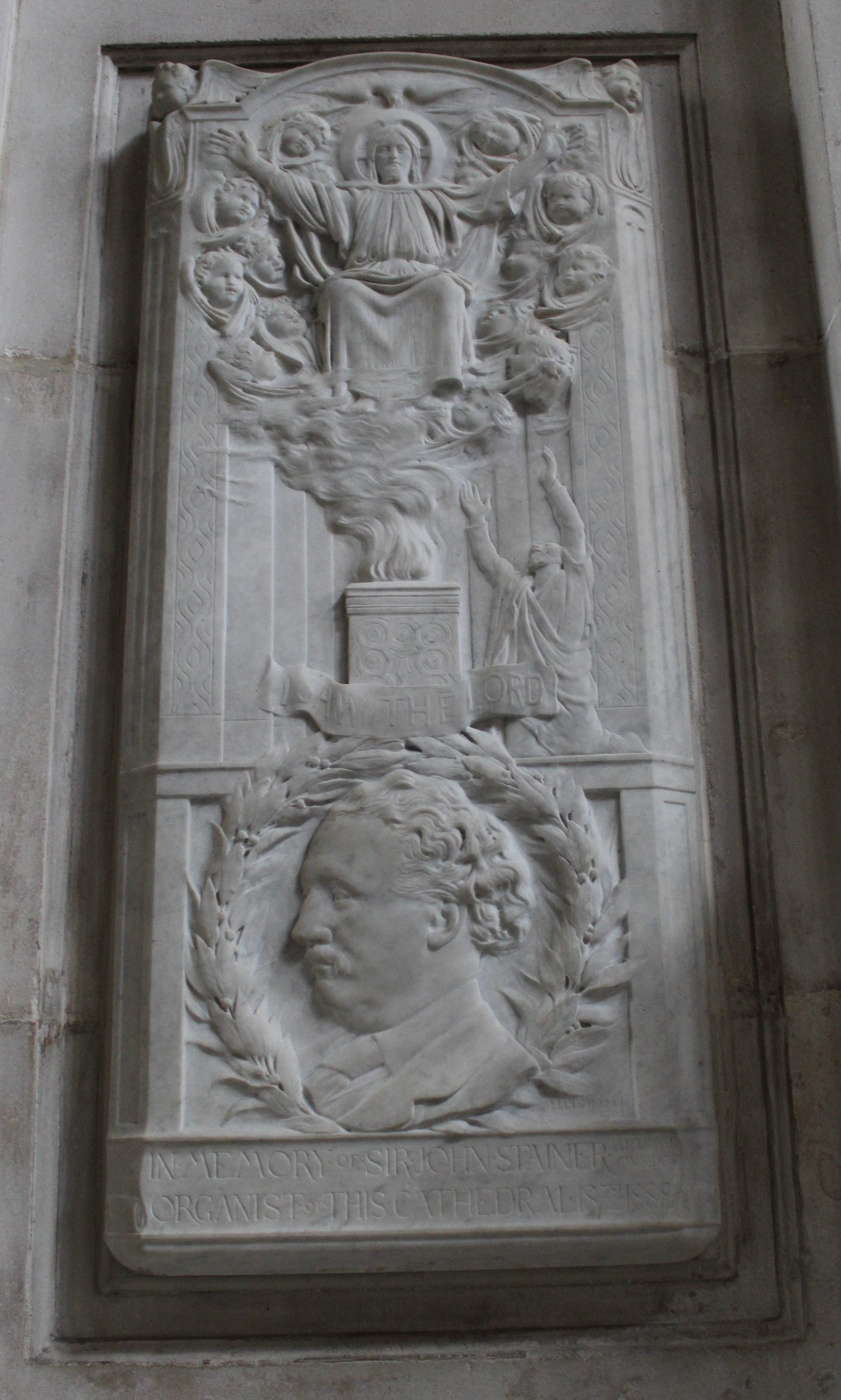
Stainer's memorial in St Paul's Cathedral by Henry Alfred Pegram

Stainer's output of sacred music was extensive, including the Passion cantata or oratorio The Crucifixion (1887), the Sevenfold Amen (this latter piece was especially admired by the lexicographer Sir George Grove), and numerous hymn tunes, including "Cross of Jesus", "All for Jesus" (both from The Crucifixion), and "Love Divine". His settings for the Gloria and Sanctus were sung at the coronation of Edward VII in 1902.

His work as a composer was much esteemed during his lifetime but is not well known today - and Stainer himself was dismissive of his own work, telling Edmund Fellowes that "he regretted ever having published most of his compositions". The Crucifixion is one of the few major works of his that is still regularly performed. It is often given in Anglican churches during Holy Week and forms part of the repertoire of numerous choirs. He also made a lasting contribution to the music of Christmas in his Christmas Carols New and Old (1871), produced in collaboration with the Revd. H. R. Bramley, which marked an important stage in the revival of the Christmas carol. The book includes Stainer's arrangements of what were to become the standard versions of "What Child Is This", "God Rest Ye Merry Gentlemen", "Good King Wenceslas", "The First Nowell", and "I Saw Three Ships", among others. He was a skilled musician and accompanist and Walter Galpin Alcock, who was taught composition by Arthur Sullivan at the National Training School of Music, recalls Sullivan saying "I was at St Paul's yesterday, listening to Dr Stainer extemporising. My dear young friends, he is a genius, and I hope you will miss no chance of hearing him." John Stainer was also a close friend of Edmund Hart Turpin, the later Hon. Secr. of the Royal College of Organists for more than fifty years.

Stainer's portrait is included in William Holman Hunt's 1890 Pre-Raphaelite painting May Morning on Magdalen Tower.

== Selected list of works ==
A list of Stainer's more prominent works is provided below.

=== Anthems ===
- Awake, awake, put on thy strength, O Zion
- Blessed is the man that endureth temptation
- Drop down, ye heavens, from above
- God so loved the world (chorus from The Crucifixion)
- Grieve not the Holy Spirit of God
- Hail, Gladdening Light, of His pure glory poured
- Holy Father, God Almighty
- How beautiful upon the mountains
- I could not do without thee
- I desired wisdom
- In the cross of christ I glory
- I saw the Lord
- Jesus, tender shepherd, hear me
- Lead kindly light
- Leave us not, neither forsake us
- Lift up your heads, rejoice
- Lord Jesus, think on me
- O dayspring
- O Zion, that bringest good tidings
- We sing the glorious conquest
- What are these that are arrayed in white robes

=== Services ===
- Full services in E♭, D/A, B♭ and D
- Communion services in A, F and C

=== Hymn tunes ===
- Sebaste ("Hail Gladdening Light") (1875)
- Wycliff ("All for Jesus") (1887)
- Cross of Jesus (1887)
- Love Divine (1889)
- St Paul's to the hymn 'Lord Jesus, think on me' (New English Hymnal #70b)

=== Oratorios ===
Stainer wrote four oratorios:

- Gideon (1865)
- The Daughter of Jairus (1878)
- St Mary Magdalen (1883) Written, by request, for a performance at the Triennial Music Festival of 1883
- The Crucifixion (1887)

=== Books with carols and hymns ===
- Christmas Carols, New and Old with Henry Ramsden Bramley (London: Novello, Ewer & Co., 1878)
- A choirbook of the office of holy communion from the Cathedral Prayer Book (London: Novello & Co., 1883)
- The Hymnal Companion to the Book of Common Prayer with accompanying tunes with Edward Henry Bickersteth, Charles Vincent, D.J. Word and John Stainer (1890)
- Church Hymnary, John Stainer (ed.), 1902

=== Organ music ===
- The Village Organist, John Stainer (ed.), 1893
- Twelve Pieces for Organ, London (Novello) 1897/1900

=== Books on musical theory, history and instruments ===
- A Theory of Harmony founded on the tempered scale, with questions and exercises for the use of students (1871)
- A theory of harmony founded on the tempered scale with questions and exercises for the use of students John Stainer (1872)
- Composition (1877?)
- The Music of the Bible: with an account of the development of modern musical instruments from ancient types (London, Novello, Ewer & Co., 1879)
- A Treatise on harmony and the classification of chords with questions and exercises for the use of students' John Stainer (1880)
- The Present State of Music in England: An Inaugural Lecture delivered in the Sheldonian Theatre, Oxford, November 13, 1889 (Oxford, England: Horace Hart, 1889)
- A Dictionary of Musical Terms ed. John Stainer and W.A. Barrett (1889)
- Catalogue of English song books forming a portion of the library of Sir John Stainer, with appendices of foreign song books, collections of carols, books on bells John Stainer (1891)
- Music in Relation to the Intellect and Emotions (1892)
- Harmony with an appendix containing one hundred graduated exercises (London: Novello, Ewer & Co.,1893)
- The Organ (1909)

Church of England titles
Preceded by John Goss	Organist and Master of the Choristers of St Paul's Cathedral; 1872–1888	Succeeded by George Martin
