= Oak Park =

Oak Park or Oaks Park is the name of several places, including:

== Australia ==
- Oak Park, Victoria, a suburb of Melbourne
  - Oak Park railway station, Melbourne

== Ireland ==
- Oak Park, County Carlow, a country estate turned park

== United States ==
- Oak Park, California (Ventura County), an unincorporated community in Ventura County
- Oak Park, San Diego, California, a neighborhood
- Oak Park, Sacramento, California, a neighborhood
- Oak Park, Tampa, Florida, a neighborhood
- Oak Park, Georgia
- Oak Park, Illinois
  - Oak Park Township, Cook County, Illinois
- Oak Park, Indiana
- Oak Park, Michigan
- Oak Park, Minnesota
- Oak Park, Minot, North Dakota
- Oaks Amusement Park in Portland, Oregon
- Oaks Park (stadium), a baseball stadium in Emeryville, California, just outside Oakland, California
- Oak Park Mall in Overland Park, Kansas

== See also ==
- Oak Park station (disambiguation)
- Oakes Park (disambiguation)
- Oaks Park (London), a public park in London, UK
- Oaks Park High School (disambiguation)
