= OPHS =

OPHS may refer to:

- Oak Park High School (disambiguation)
- Oaks Park High School (disambiguation)
- Office of Public Health and Science, an agency of the United States Department of Health and Human Services
- Orange Park High School, Orange Park, Florida, United States
