= Oaks Park High School =

Oaks Park High School can refer to either of the following:

- Oaks Park High School, Carshalton
- Oaks Park High School, Ilford

== See also ==
- Oak Park High School (disambiguation)
