= Newbury Park, London =

Coordinates: 51.5767°N 0.0862°E

Newbury Park
- Location within Greater London
- OS grid reference: TQ445885
- London borough: Redbridge
- Ceremonial county: Greater London
- Region: London
- Country: England
- Sovereign state: United Kingdom
- Post town: ILFORD
- Postcode district: IG2
- Dialling code: 020
- Police: Metropolitan
- Fire: London
- Ambulance: London
- UK Parliament: Ilford South
- London Assembly: Havering and Redbridge

Newbury Park is an area of Ilford in east London situated in the London Borough of Redbridge east of Gants Hill. The main road is the Eastern Avenue (A12), which until the 1920s was a country lane called Hatch Lane. The main landmark in this area is the tube station whose post-war bus shelter received a Festival of Britain award in 1951. The shelter was designed by architect Oliver Hill in 1937.

== History ==
The name Newbury was first recorded in 1348. The area, along with the rest of Ilford, was part of the county of Essex until 1965, when the new borough became a part of Greater London.

The station was originally opened by the Great Eastern Railway in 1903 on the Fairlop Loop, before being transferred to the London Underground in 1947, and partially rebuilt, but the planned complete re-building has been suspended to this day. Steam services southward to Ilford railway station ceased at this time, the track being lifted by 1956. Central line tube services now burrow underground and swing sharply west towards Gants Hill, Leytonstone and central London.

At one time, it had two hospitals: the King George V and Ilford Maternity Hospital. They have both been demolished and replaced by blocks of flats, while a new hospital called King George V has been built further east in Little Heath.

== Religion ==
According to the 2021 Census data for Newbury Park (Lower Layer Super Output Area E02000767), the religious composition of the area is as follows: Christian: 2,399 individuals (approximately 27.8%), Muslim: 2,229 individuals (approximately 25.8%), Hindu: 2,091 individuals (approximately 24.2%), Sikh: 341 individuals (approximately 4.0%), Jewish: 296 individuals (approximately 3.4%), No religion: 600 individuals (approximately 7.0%), Other religions: 125 individuals (approximately 1.4%), Religion not stated: 496 individuals (approximately 5.7%)

The area has two synagogues: a constituent of the United Synagogue (orthodox), and the South West Essex Reform Jewish synagogue. A third synagogue, the Barkingside Progressive Synagogue, is, despite its name, also in Newbury Park. The area also has a number of Churches such as the Catholic Church St. Teresa's near the station. Newbury Park is also home to the Newbury Park Mosque, located on Oaks Lane. The mosque serves the local Muslim community and can accommodate up to 400 worshippers. It offers regular daily prayers, Friday congregational prayers, and educational classes for both children and adults.

== Transport ==
The nearest London Underground station is Newbury Park on the Central line.

== Geography ==
Nearby places are Aldborough Hatch, Barkingside, Gants Hill, Goodmayes, Seven Kings and Ilford's town centre. The A12 road runs through Newbury Park and a shopping complex lies near the Eastern Avenue / Horns Road junction. Stores include Aldi, Pets at Home, B&Q and a Lidl.

== Education ==
Nearby schools include Valentines High School and recently opened Seven Kings Primary attached to Seven Kings High School. Newbury Park Primary School is on Perrymans Farm Road, opening in 1904 as the Horns Elementary School. William Torbitt Primary is on Eastern Avenue. The Oaks Park High School, at the eastern end of Perrymans Farm Road, opened in 2001.
