= Listed buildings in Ripple, Kent =

Historic structures in Kent, England

Ripple is a village and civil parish in the Dover District of Kent, England. It contains 19 listed buildings that are recorded in the National Heritage List for England. Of these three are grade I and 16 are grade II.

This list is based on the information retrieved online from Historic England.

== Key ==
| Grade | Criteria |
|---|---|
| I | Buildings that are of exceptional interest |
| II* | Particularly important buildings of more than special interest |
| II | Buildings that are of special interest |

== Listing ==
| Name | Grade | Location | Type | Completed (Note: The date given is the date used by Historic England as significant for the initial building or that of an important part in the structure's description.) | Date designated | Grid ref. (Note: The grid reference is based on the British national grid reference system, sometimes known as OSGB36, used by the Ordnance Survey.) Geo-coordinates | Notes | Entry number (Note: The "List Entry Number" is a unique number assigned to each listed building and scheduled monument by Historic England.) | Image | Wikidata |
|---|---|---|---|---|---|---|---|---|---|---|
| Barn About 30 Metres South of Ripple Farmhouse | II | Chapel Lane, Ripple Farm | | | 13 October 1952 | TR3500049445; 51°11′45″N 1°21′44″E | | 1237411 | Upload Photo | Q26530557 |
| Ripple Farmhouse | II | Chapel Lane | | | 13 October 1952 | TR3499849485; 51°11′46″N 1°21′44″E | | 1237013 | Upload Photo | Q26530200 |
| Ripple Vale House | II | Chapel Lane, School | | | 13 October 1952 | TR3511249733; 51°11′54″N 1°21′50″E | | 1237408 | Upload Photo | Q26530554 |
| The Cottage | II | Chapel Lane | | | 24 March 1987 | TR3503349779; 51°11′56″N 1°21′46″E | | 1264329 | Upload Photo | Q26555034 |
| Church Farmhouse | II | Church Lane | | | 24 March 1987 | TR3511550324; 51°12′13″N 1°21′52″E | | 1237016 | Upload Photo | Q26530203 |
| Church of St Mary the Virgin | II* | Church Lane | church building | | 24 March 1987 | TR3503150208; 51°12′10″N 1°21′47″E | | 1264330 | Church of St Mary the Virgin More images | Q17557828 |
| Group of 3 Headstones About 12 Metres North West of Church of St Mary | II | Church Lane | | | 24 March 1987 | TR3501650216; 51°12′10″N 1°21′46″E | | 1237478 | Upload Photo | Q26530621 |
| Ripple House | II | Church Lane | | | 11 October 1963 | TR3508050265; 51°12′12″N 1°21′50″E | | 1237015 | Upload Photo | Q26530202 |
| Row of 7 Headstones About 2 Metres East of Church of St Mary | II | Church Lane | | | 24 March 1987 | TR3504550209; 51°12′10″N 1°21′48″E | | 1237014 | Upload Photo | Q26530201 |
| Stable Block About 15 Metres North East of Ripple House | II | Church Lane | | | 24 March 1987 | TR3510250274; 51°12′12″N 1°21′51″E | | 1237494 | Upload Photo | Q26530636 |
| Stanley Cottage | II | Church Lane | | | 24 March 1987 | TR3485949992; 51°12′03″N 1°21′38″E | | 1264332 | Upload Photo | Q26555036 |
| The Old Rectory | II | Church Lane | | | 24 March 1987 | TR3504950245; 51°12′11″N 1°21′48″E | | 1264331 | Upload Photo | Q26555035 |
| Two Headstones About 10 Metres South East of Church of St Mary | II | Church Lane | | | 24 March 1987 | TR3504750198; 51°12′09″N 1°21′48″E | | 1237442 | Upload Photo | Q26530586 |
| Ripple Windmill | II | Dover Road | smock mill | | 11 October 1963 | TR3617649033; 51°11′30″N 1°22′43″E | | 1237017 | Ripple Windmill More images | Q7335720 |
| Barn and Farmyard Buildings About 10 to 25 Metres South East of Ripple Court | II | Ripple Court | | | 24 March 1987 | TR3496348753; 51°11′23″N 1°21′40″E | | 1237012 | Upload Photo | Q26530199 |
| Old Farm House | II | Ripple Court | | | 11 October 1963 | TR3500248763; 51°11′23″N 1°21′42″E | | 1237381 | Upload Photo | Q26530530 |
| Ripple Court and Outhouses in Rear Courtyard | II* | Ripple Court | | | 11 October 1963 | TR3493048811; 51°11′25″N 1°21′39″E | | 1237011 | Upload Photo | Q17557769 |
| Terrace Wall and Walled Garden Adjacent to Winklandoaks Farmhouse | II | Sutton, Winkoaklands | | | 24 March 1987 | TR3397448412; 51°11′13″N 1°20′49″E | | 1237018 | Upload Photo | Q26530205 |
| Winklandoaks Farmhouse | II* | Sutton, Winklandoaks Farm | farmhouse | | 11 October 1963 | TR3399348423; 51°11′14″N 1°20′50″E | | 1264333 | Winklandoaks Farmhouse More images | Q17557834 |

== See also ==
- Grade I listed buildings in Kent
- Grade II* listed buildings in Kent

== Sources ==
- Newman, John (2013) [1969], Kent: North-East and East, The Buildings of England, New Haven and London: Yale University Press, ISBN 978-0-300-18506-5
