= St John's Blackheath =

- St John the Evangelist's Church
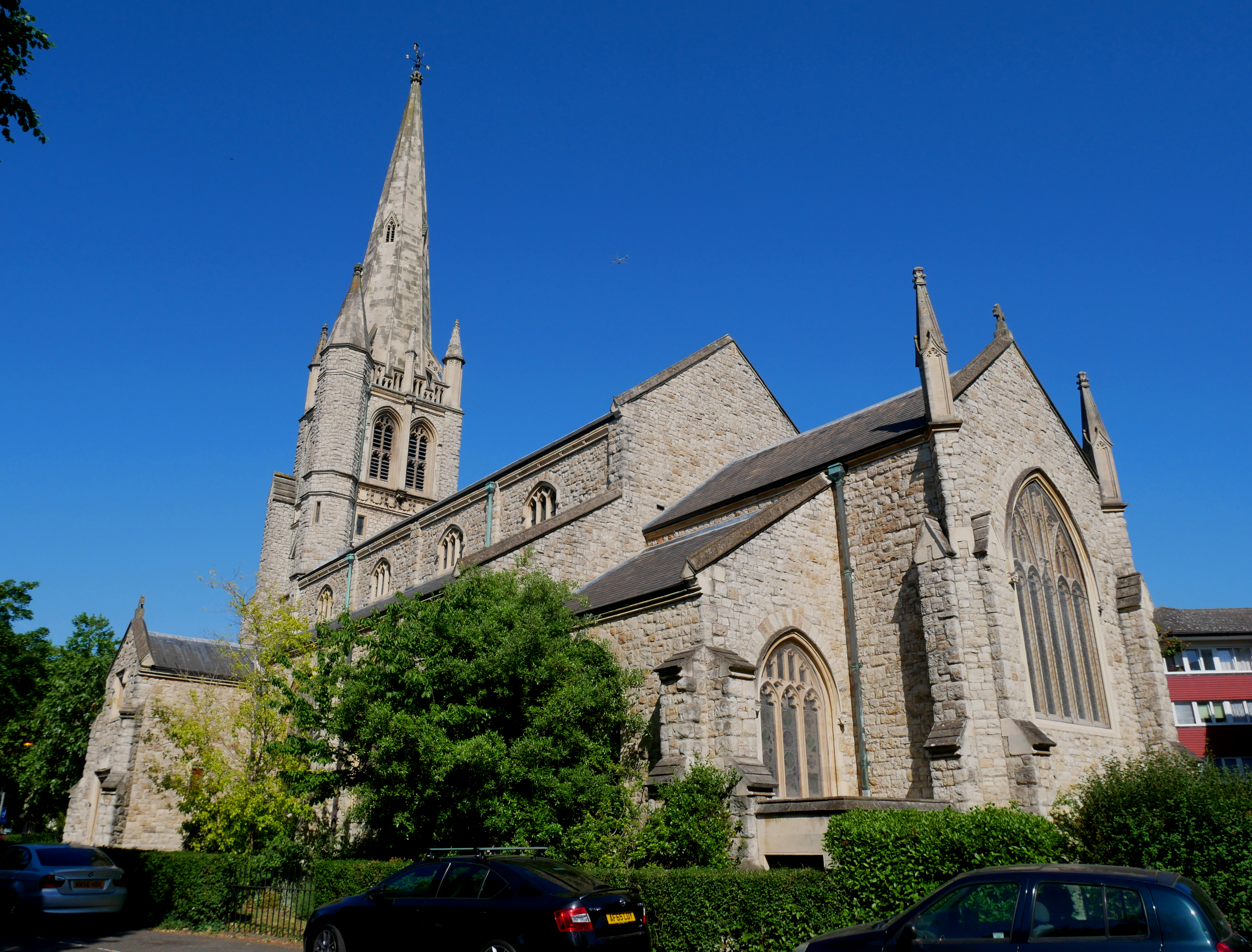
- The church from the southeast
- St John's Blackheath
- 51.4758°N 0.0187°E
- OS grid reference: TQ 40294 77135
- Location: Stratheden Road, Blackheath, London SE3 7TH
- Country: England
- Denomination: Anglican
- Churchmanship: Evangelical
- Website: www.stjohnsblackheath.org.uk

History
- Status: Parish church

Architecture
- Functional status: Active
- Heritage designation: Grade II
- Designated: 8 June 1973
- Architect: Arthur Ashpitel
- Style: Perpendicular Gothic Revival
- Completed: 1853

Administration
- Diocese: Southwark
- Archdeaconry: Lewisham and Greenwich
- Deanery: Charlton
- Parish: Blackheath, St John the Evangelist

Clergy
- Vicar: Eddie Scrase-Field

St John's Blackheath (formally known as St John the Evangelist's Church) is an all age Anglican church in the Vanbrugh Park area of Blackheath, part of the Royal Borough of Greenwich in southeast London, England. Built in the 1850s to the design of architect Arthur Ashpitel, it provided "an important visual and spiritual focus" to a rapidly growing high-class residential area. The church has an Evangelical character. There are two services on a Sunday. St John's Blackheath has thriving children's groups and youth groups.

== History ==
The residential area now known as Vanbrugh Park, east of Greenwich Park and north of the present A2 road, was laid out in the early part of the Victorian era. Architect Arthur Ashpitel from Hackney was commissioned to design a new church for this district, which at the time (prior to the Local Government Act 1888) was in the county of Kent. It was his only new church in Kent, although he restored the medieval building at Ripple. Work began in 1852 and the church was completed in 1853.

Some stained glass windows in the north aisle were destroyed during World War II and were subsequently replaced. The interior was altered in 1999; some of the space at the west end was taken up by new facilities such as offices and a kitchen.

The church was listed at Grade II on 8 June 1973. English Heritage defines Grade II-listed buildings as "nationally important" and of "special interest". The war memorial outside the church, designed by J.B.L. Tolhurst and unveiled on 11 November 1922, was separately listed at Grade II on 19 May 2016.

== Architecture ==
St John the Evangelist's Church is "a local landmark" and "a focal point" in a prominent position: it stands on an island surrounded by roads and housing, and is clearly visible in the streetscape especially from the west. It is built of Kentish Ragstone, a local material, and has a roof of Welsh slate. The plan consists of a nave with aisles on both sides, an aisled chancel with a lower roofline and flanked by a vestry and an organ chamber, porches on two sides, and a tower and the west end. This is topped with a "good" tall spire whose lowest stage is concealed by a parapet. The tower is buttressed at each corner and has windows with decorative tracery, clock faces, a pinnacled upper stage and a stair turret in one corner. The architectural style is largely Perpendicular Gothic Revival, which was out of fashion by the 1850s, although there are some Decorated Gothic Revival elements. The architect Arthur Ashpitel, who worked extensively in Kent, was associated with Anglican evangelicalism; this may have led him to use the Perpendicular style, which was popular with that movement.

Inside, the fittings date mostly from the late 19th century and include a rood screen and reredos by H.S. Rogers. The west-end gallery installed by D. Drury in 1898 was removed during the 1999 reordering. The firm of Heaton, Butler and Bayne designed many of the stained-glass windows.

== Services and administration ==
There are two Sunday services, 10.15am and 6.00pm including a morning Eucharistic service at 8.00am on the 2nd Sunday of the month, using the Book of Common Prayer.

The Church Pastoral Aid Society holds the patronage of St John the Evangelist's Church. The population of the parish was estimated at 4,962 in 2001. It is within the Deanery of Charlton and the Archdeaconry of Lewisham in the Anglican Diocese of Southwark.

== Gallery ==
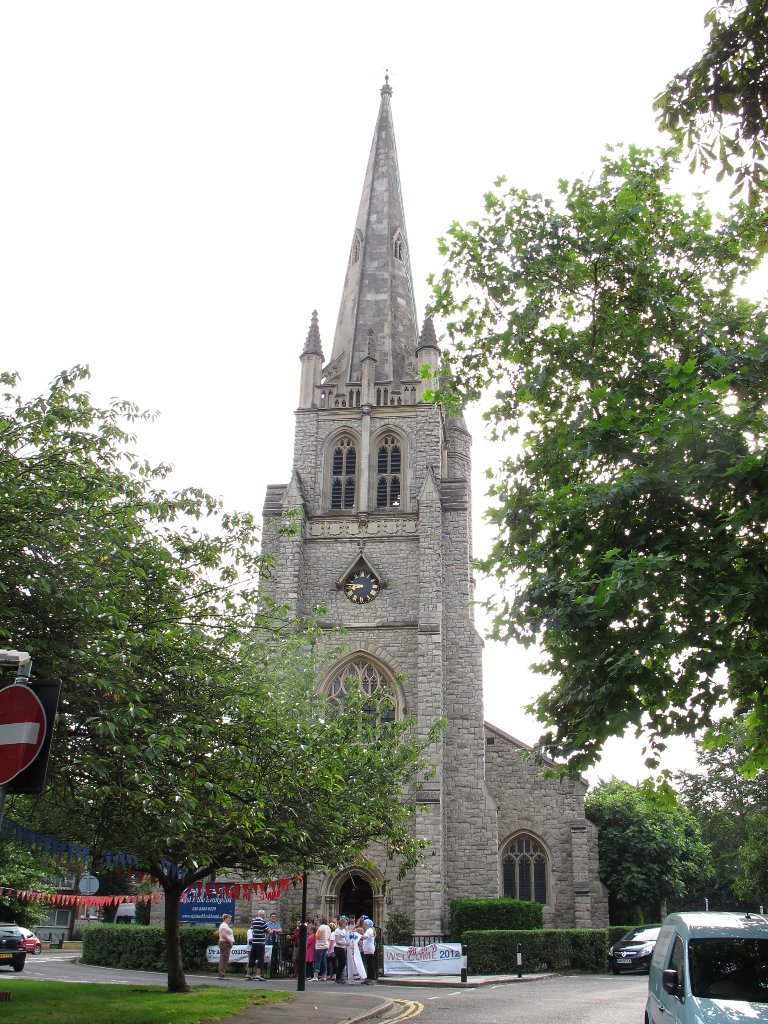
Tower

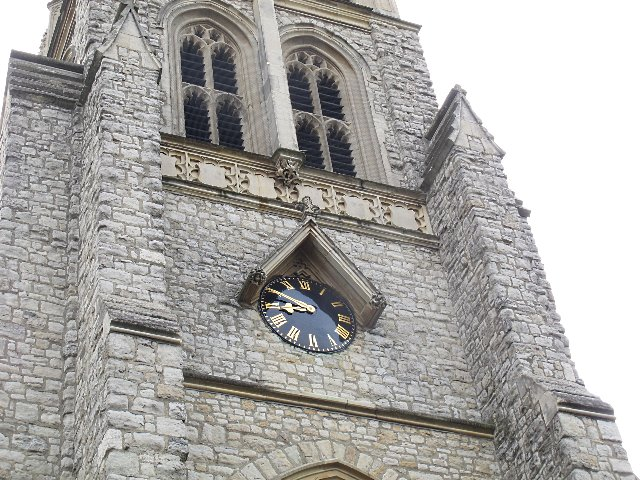
Clock

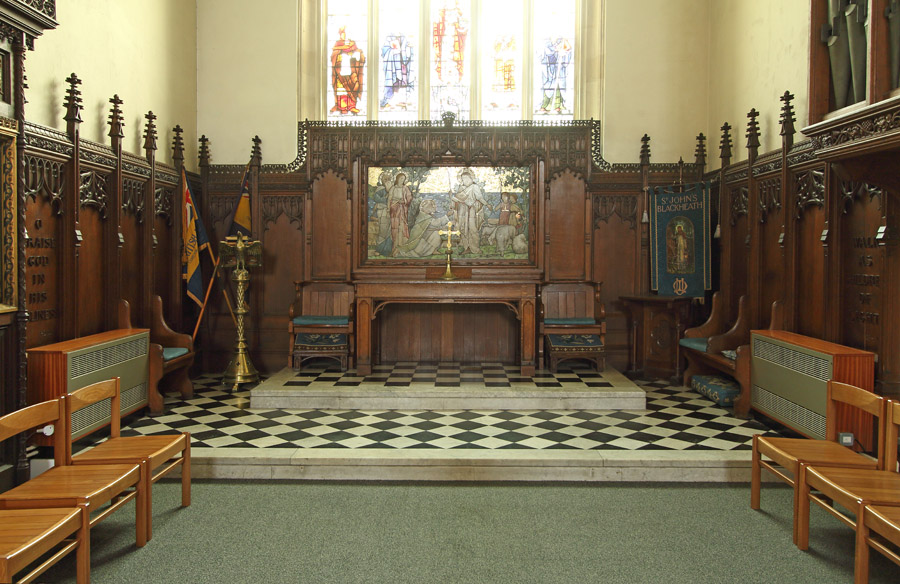
Altar and chancel

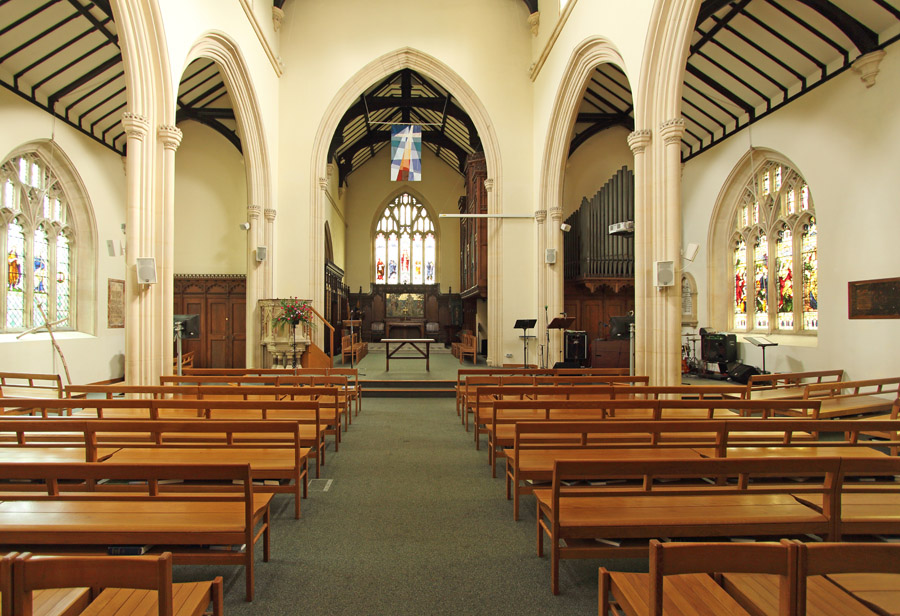
Nave

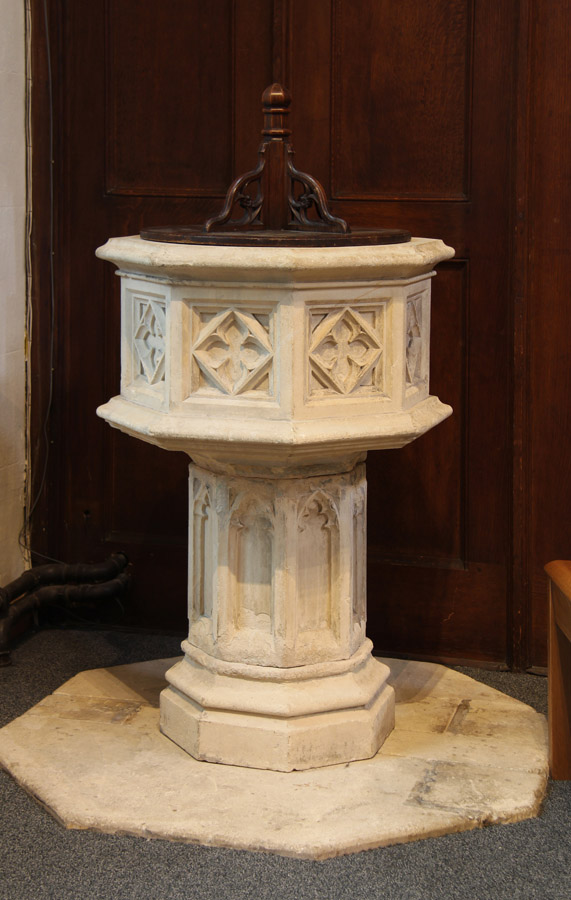
Font

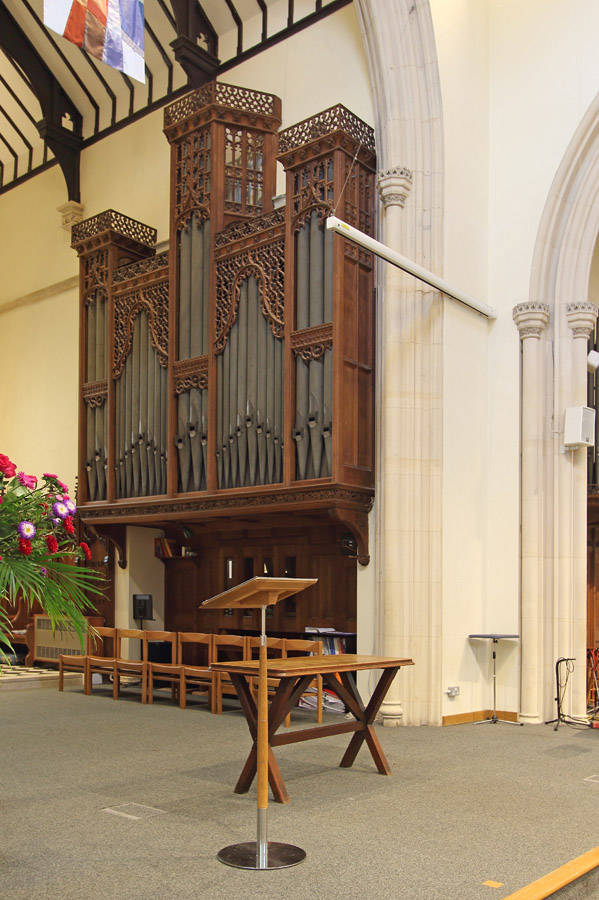
Organ

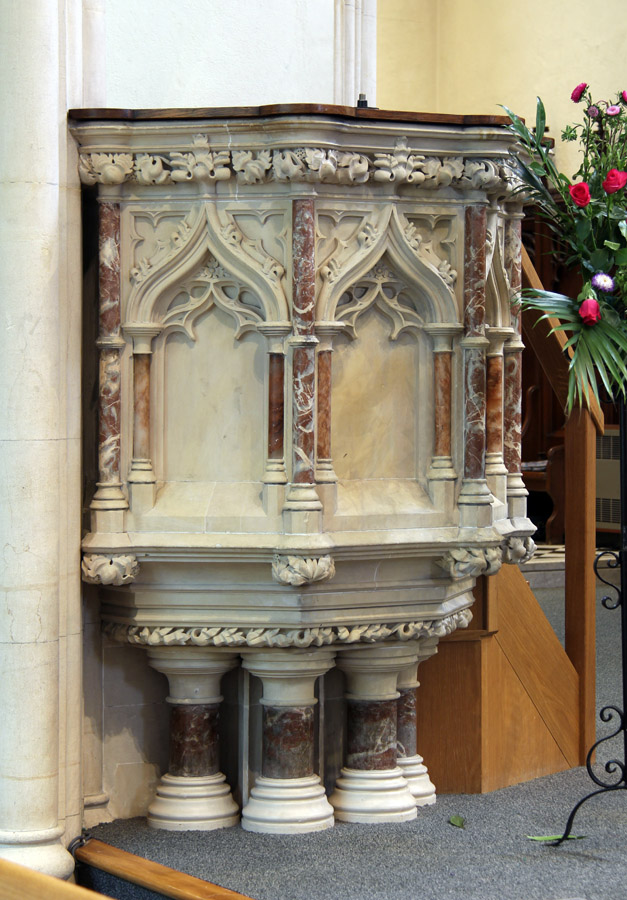
Pulpit

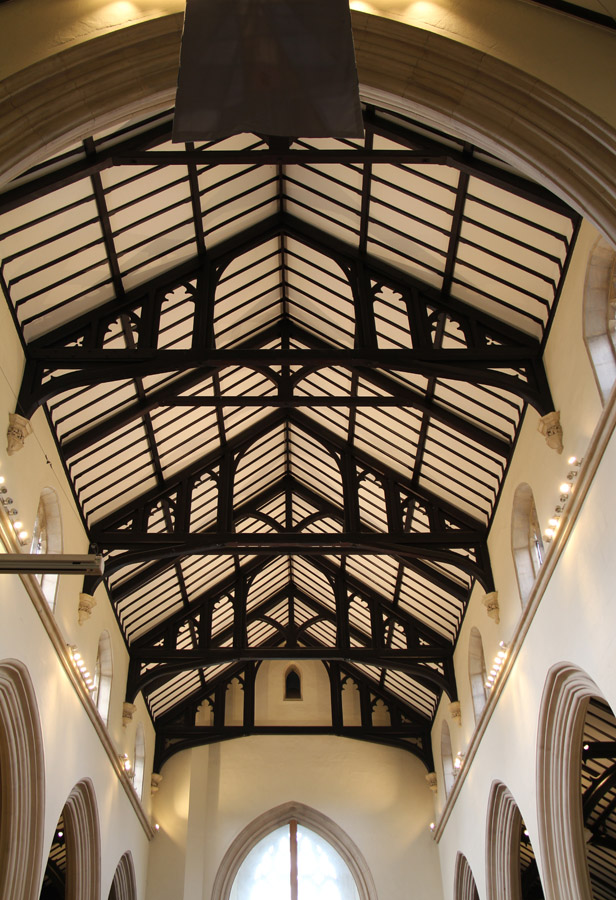
Ceiling

== See also ==
- Diocese of Southwark
- Blackheath

== Bibliography ==
- Cherry, Bridget; Pevsner, Nikolaus (2002) [1983]. London 2: South. The Buildings of England (2nd ed.). London: Yale University Press. ISBN 0-300-09651-8.
- Homan, Roger (1984). The Victorian Churches of Kent. Chichester: Phillimore & Co. Ltd. ISBN 0-85033-466-7.
