= Newbury Park =

Newbury Park can refer to:

- Newbury Park, California
  - Newbury Park High School
- Newbury Park, London
  - Newbury Park tube station
