= SKHS =

SKHS may refer to:

- Norwegian National Academy of Craft and Art Industry (Norwegian: Statens håndverks- og kunstindustriskole), Oslo, Norway
- Seven Kings High School, Ilford, Essex, England
- South Kingstown High School, Wakefield, Rhode Island, United States
- South Kitsap High School, Port Orchard, Washington, United States
