= Stanley High School =

Stanley High School may refer to:

- Stanley High School (Southport), a school in Merseyside, England
- Stanley High School (New Brunswick), a school in Stanley, New Brunswick, Canada

== See also ==
- Stanley Park High School, a school in Carshalton, Surrey, England
- Stanley Technical High School, former name of Harris Academy South Norwood, a school in London, England
