= Aldborough Hatch =

Area of Ilford, London, England

Coordinates: 51.583°N 0.101°E

- Area
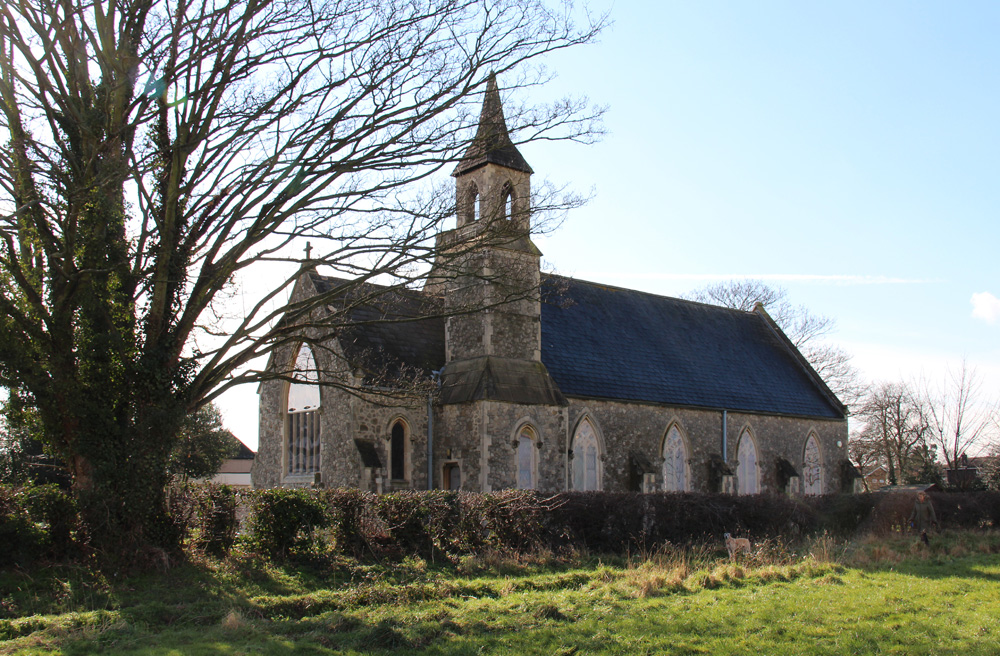
- St Peter's church

- Location within Greater London
- Population: 14,544
- OS grid reference: TQ455895
- London borough: Redbridge
- Ceremonial county: Greater London
- Region: London
- Country: England
- Sovereign state: United Kingdom
- Post town: ILFORD
- Postcode district: IG2
- Dialling code: 020
- Police: Metropolitan
- Fire: London
- Ambulance: London
- UK Parliament: Ilford North
- London Assembly: Havering and Redbridge

Aldborough Hatch is an area in Ilford in east London, England, within the London Borough of Redbridge. It is located 11.1 miles (18 km) east-northeast of Charing Cross. It is a semi-rural locality situated to the east of Barkingside and Newbury Park.

Aldborough is a ward in the London Borough of Redbridge. The population at the 2011 Census was 14,544.

== Toponymy and history ==
The name probably derives from the Alborgh or Albourgh family who occupied the manor in the Middle Ages and mentioned in 14th and 15th-century records. 'Hatch' derives from the Old English word hæcc ('a hatch gate'), which originally gave access to Hainault Forest when it stood here. It is marked as Aldborough Hatch on the 1883 Ordnance Survey map. (Note: Name, p 1 - 2)

Hainault Forest used to be some 3,000 acres and was a royal hunting forest providing venison for the King's table. Parliament considered it to be a waste and in 1819 passed a bill for the disafforestation of Hainault Forest which got thrown out by the House of Lords. In 1851, ignoring public opinion, Parliament pushed through the Hainault Forest Inclosure Act 1851 (14 & 15 Vict. c. 43), enabling the area to be converted to agricultural use. 24,714 oak trees, 3,377 oak pollards, and 86,679 Hornbeam pollards (over 90% of the forest) were grubbed out, some of which were transported to be used to build ships for the Royal Navy. Straight roads such as Hainault Road and Painters Road were built to allow access to the new farms. It was found that the land was marginal and some has since been built on. (Note: Hainault Forest, p 3 - 5)

== Listed buildings ==
=== Statutory listed ===
The buildings below are statutory listed buildings.

- St. Peter's Church, Aldborough Road North, Grade II, listed 22.2.79, built 1862
- Barn at Aldborough House Farm, Oaks Lane, formerly Chapel, Grade II, listed 22.2.79, built 1730
- Newbury Park Station Bus Shelter, Eastern Avenue, Grade II, listed 19.3.81, built 1949

=== Locally listed ===
The buildings below are locally listed buildings.

- Gazebo and walling to public house, circa 18th century, Aldborough Road North, south of Dick Turpin Inn
- Former school adjacent to St. Peter's Church, Aldborough Road North
- Surviving north and west walls of kitchen garden enclosure, circa 1800, r/o Nos. 211–233, Oaks Lane
- Large timber barn, circa 18th century, Aldborough Hatch Farm, Oaks Lane
- Barn B, circa 1850, typically built machine-sawn softwood building, Aldborough Hatch Farm, Oaks Lane
- Garden wall at the rear of 1-2 Lake Cottages, Oaks Lane
- Whites Farm, circa 1860, Oaks Lane
- Hainault Farm, Hainault Road (West Side), built in 1855
- Farm buildings, Nos. 1-4 (consec) adjacent to Hainault Works, Hainault Road (east side)

== Places of worship ==
=== St. Peter's Church ===
Under the Hainault Forest Inclosure Act (1851) land was set aside for the erection of a church for the new population expected in the district. In 1861 the Commissioners of Woods and Forests agreed to give £1,000 for a building that would take the place of the chapel at Aldborough Hatch, and promised that they would continue the annual payment of £20 towards the salary of the incumbent. Local inhabitants also contributed to the building fund including Mrs. Verbeke, who lived at Aldborough Grange. In 1861/62 a church was built, and a district chapelry, taken from the parish of Holy Trinity, Barkingside, was formed. The church of St. Peter, Aldborough Hatch, was designed by Arthur Ashpitel in a 13th-century style. The builders also had the contract to demolish Westminster Bridge, which was built of Portland stone. Rather than use bricks from the brickfields of Ilford, it was cheaper to transport the stone by barge and horse and cart. (Note: The New Chapel at Aldborough Hatch, p 20 - 21) The church was consecrated on 6 May 1862. (Note: The New Chapel at Aldborough Hatch, p 22)

==== Organ ====
The organ at St. Peter's was built by Gray and Davison for the London Exhibition in 1862 held in the Royal Horticultural Society gardens. The Science Museum now stands on the site. It is said that the organ was then installed in a public house in the East End of London before being acquired by Charles and Bessie Painter of Aldborough Hall, who presented it to St. Peter's in 1898 in memory of their son, Charles Alec, who died on 11 February 1893 aged six months. Herbert Freshwater was appointed organ blower at £1 10s per annum in 1898, for the organ was hand pumped until 1951. The organ was rebuilt and enlarged by Gray and Davison in 1958. Restoration in 1994 cost £17,500 and in 1999 two stops were installed coupling the big pedal to the great and swell manuals. (Note: The Organ at St. Peter's, p 46 - 47) The public house, where the organ is said to have been installed, was most likely the Ship and Turtle in Leadenhall Street, London which was owned by Mr George Painter of Aldborough Hall.

==== Church school and halls ====
Aldborough Hatch Church of England School was built in 1867. The architect was G. R. Clarke. There is an engraved stone beneath the eaves that reads "Her Majesty Queen Victoria granted this site and £200 towards the building of this school erected to the Glory of God and to the use of the poor of Aldborough Hatch". It was built to accommodate 160 boys and girls. In 1895 the average attendance was 135. The school was closed in 1912 when the building was adapted for use as St. Peter's Church halls. In 1948 the site of the church halls was purchased from the Crown Land Commissioners for £50. The halls were extended in 1958 at a cost of £4,714.14s.5d, when two flat roofed structures were added. One is a large hall that fronts onto Aldborough Road North, the other a Vestry room on the north west corner. The headquarters of the 1st Aldborough Hatch (St. Peter's) Scout Group was added and opened on 3 February 1979. (Note: Aldborough Church School and Church Halls, p 44 - 45)

==== Vicarage ====
The first vicarage was built around 1879 adjacent to the south-west corner of the churchyard. It had an extensive garden to the south, a large field to the west, known as the meadow, and a lake to the south of that. The meadow was used for fêtes and garden parties, and by the Scouts and Guides who camped there. When he was living there it was common for Revd. Pickles to swim in the lake and undertake gardening naked. The vicarage was demolished in 1965 when the Revd. Jack Hesketh, who, as incumbent, held the title deeds of the vicarage and associated land, and with agreement from the Crown Land Commissioners sold them to a builder for housing for £82,500. The sum was invested for the benefit of the vicar which meant that his stipend was one of the greatest in the diocese and said to be greater than that of the bishop. The Revd. Hesketh died suddenly at the end of 1965, only had the benefit of this stipend for a few months and never occupied the new vicarage which was erected as part of the deal with the builders. When church law changed in the 1970s the stipend reverted to be the same as that for other clergy, and the Diocese probably put the balance in their general funds. Therefore, except for a short time, neither subsequent vicars, nor the parish benefited financially from the sale of the land (the proceeds of which would be worth in excess of £1 million today), despite assurances given to the Parochial Church Council at the time. The new vicarage was built close to the site of the old one and has an attached parish office with its own external entrance. The assorted housing that was built now forms St Peters Close. (Note: St. Peter's Vicarage, p 31 - 36)

=== South West Essex and Settlement Reform Synagogue ===
South West Essex and Settlement Reform Synagogue is in Oaks Lane and was founded in 1956. (Note: South West Essex and Settlement Reform Synagogue, p 91)

=== East London Christian Fellowship Centre ===
The centre is in Whites farm in Oaks Lane and is an evangelical Christian church. It conducts services in English and Chinese (Cantonese and Mandarin). (Note: East London Christian Fellowship Centre, p 91)

=== Mata Sahib Kaur Sikh Academy ===
The academy was founded early this century and closed on Sunday 21 August 2016. It was in what used to be the Methodist church in Oaks Lane that was built in 1934. (Note: Mata Sahib Kaur Sikh Academy, p 91)

=== Newbury Park Islamic Cultural Centre ===
The centre is located in Oaks Lane, close to Whites farm. There is a main prayer hall with a capacity for up to 75 worshippers, and a basement prayer hall and lecture room with capacity for 75 worshippers. A single storey mosque was completed in early 2017. (Note: Single storey mosque, p 91)

== Education ==
=== William Torbitt Primary School ===
William Torbitt Primary School is on the A12 road, (Eastern Avenue,). The school was named after William Stansfield Torbitt who was Director of Education for the Municipal Borough of Ilford from 1903 to 1938. The official opening of the school was held on 9 September 1937. The ceremony was performed by the Mayor of Ilford, Alderman H. Billington J.P., with Mr. William Torbitt in attendance.

=== Oaks Park High School ===
Oaks Park High School in Oaks Lane opened on Friday 7 September 2001 and is a 10-19 mixed comprehensive with 1,260 students in the main school. The sixth form has grown rapidly since it opened in September 2006 and offers wide range of courses to students, both from Oaks Park and other schools. It has nearly 600 students. Oaks Park became a specialist music college in September 2006.

=== Newbury Park Islamic Cultural Centre ===
The centre provides education in the religion of Islam.

== Transport ==
=== Trains ===
Newbury Park Underground station on the Central line is on the western edge of Aldborough Hatch. (Note: Newbury Park Station, p 102 - 103)

=== Buses ===
All the bus routes travel along the A12 road that runs through the area.

Route Number	Route	Via	Operator
66	Leytonstone to Romford Station	Redbridge Gants Hill Newbury Park	Arriva London
296	Roden Street to Romford Station	Ilford Gants Hill Newbury Park Marks Gate Community Centre	Stagecoach
396	Roden Street to King George Hospital	Ilford Gants Hill Newbury Park	Stagecoach

A former London Transport route 139 used to run along the A12 road. The Eastern National 251 bus used to run along the A12 road.

== Aldborough Grange and Estate ==
Aldborough Grange was a mansion which stood on the south corner where Applegarth Drive meets Aldborough Road North, opposite St. Peter's Church. In 1836 William Pearce JP of Aldborough Grange (Great Ilford) wrote a letter to the finance committee, suggesting that the cost of feeding prisoners awaiting examination by a magistrate should be paid from the county rate, as this could no longer be paid from the poor rate.

The mansion was demolished and houses were built in the 1930s forming the Aldborough Grange Estate. A leaflet produced by Suburban Developments (London) Limited advertised their "Type C Improved" houses: "Come and live here! You'll be happy and house-proud. The Aldborough Grange Estate is 30 minutes from London by London North Eastern Railway (LNER) to Newbury Park Station. Get out at Newbury Park and the Estate is a few minutes' walk along the Ilford to Southend Road. Open country right at the doors; the seaside less than an hour by coach; Ilford's great shopping centres close by. Everything for everybody!" Centre houses were priced from £695 and with a brick built garage the price went up to £780. "£35 deposit and you take possession!" said the leaflet, adding that: "There's nothing shoddy about these houses - everything is modern and of the best". (Note: Aldborough Grange and the Grange Estate, p 99 - 100)

== Aldborough Hall and Equestrian Centre ==
Aldborough Hall was built in the 1830s at the north-west corner of what is now the junction of Aldborough Road North and Painters Road. The Painter family owned the hall from the 1850s to the early part of the 20th century, when it was purchased by a member of the McAdam family, known for its macadam road building technology. The hall was used as an Officers' Mess during World War II by the nearby Fairlop Airfield. Bob and Mary Garrett undertook major renovation and rebuilding after the war, as the hall was in disrepair. Outbuildings were saved and incorporated into the building of the Aldborough Hall Equestrian Centre, founded in 1956. (Note: Aldborough Hall, p 74 - 75)

=== Police box ===
Police box J47 stood at the entrance to Aldborough Hall on the north corner of the junction of Painters Road and Aldborough Road from 6 January 1936 to 17 August 1959.

== Farms ==
The farms below are in the area.

=== Aldborough House Farm ===
Aldborough House farmhouse was built in Oaks Lane in 1856. A barn on the farm is a listed building. (Note: Aldborough House Farm, p 83 - 85)

=== Aldborough Hatch Farm ===
Aldborough Hatch farmhouse, also in Oaks Lane, was built in 1854. It was amalgamated with Aldborough House farm when the Oaks Lane estate was built and land was lost. (Note: Aldborough Hatch Farm, p 86 - 87)

=== Aldborough Hall Farm ===
Aldborough Hall farmhouse in Aldborough Road North was built around 1855. It expanded into pick-your-own fruit and vegetables and opened a farm shop in the mid-1960s. Working with the RSPCA, the farm rescued animals and allowed the public to view them. Redbridge Council reclaimed the land in 2004 for gravel extraction. The pick-your-own and farm shop closed, and the animals were rehomed. The farm was closed to the public in 2006. (Note: Aldborough Hall Farm, p 88)

=== Willow Farm ===
Willow Farm farmhouse, in Billet Road, was built in the late 1800s. The London Borough of Redbridge local plan (page 29) includes the building of 1,100 new homes on the farm. (Note: Willow Farm, p 90)

=== Whites Farm ===
Whites Farm farmhouse in Oaks Lane was built in 1860 and has an ironwork veranda. It is a locally listed building. The farm was associated with the family of John Le White in 1285. The East London Christian Fellowship Centre is based here. (Note: Whites Farm, p 91)

=== Hainault Farm ===
Hainault Farm farmhouse and buildings were constructed in 1855. They are locally listed. The farm is on the eastern edge of what became RAF Fairlop. (Note: Hainault Farm, p 93)

== RAF Fairlop ==
There was an airfield on Fairlop plain during World War I flying Sopwith Camels. The hangars for them opposite Hainault Farm were used during World War II and exist today. The airfield reverted to agriculture after the war. In the late 1930s, it was purchased by the City of London Corporation with the intention of upgrading it to a major airport, but the Munich crisis in 1938 caused the project to be shelved. In September 1940 it was requisitioned by the Ministry of Defence and became operational on 10 September 1941, after the Battle of Britain. The last operational flights took place in March 1944. During the Second World War over 1,000 personnel were stationed there. Spitfires and Typhoons were amongst the aircraft that flew from Fairlop. The station closed in August 1946. It was briefly considered again as a site for a new London airport, but in 1950 the government decided it should remain as an open space and Heathrow was developed instead. (Note: Fairlop Airfield, p 94 - 95)

== Fairlop Waters ==
Fairlop Waters on Fairlop Plain is on the northern tip of Aldborough Hatch. The main entrance is in Forest Road close to Fairlop station. Tfl bus route 462 also provides a service. Part of it was Fairlop Airfield during the two world wars. Formerly crown land it was then owned by London County Council and now by Redbridge Council. Sand and gravel extraction started in the 1950s and continues today. The extracted areas were infilled and form the park and leisure centre. In addition to the flora and fauna, there is a 38-acre lake for canoeing, sailing and windsurfing, which has two islands, the largest of which is a habitat for wild birds. There are 9 and 18 hole golf courses, and a specimen lake for anglers. There is also a function hall/meeting room, bar and restaurant. The area was the subject of an objection to the plans for an all-weather racecourse, which were overturned in 2002 by the Deputy Prime Minister John Prescott. (Note: Fairlop Waters, p 96 - 98)

== Chase Lane ==
The London Gazette of 13 January 1863, whilst reporting on the creation of the chapelry of St. Peter at Aldborough Hatch and the Parish boundaries, states, "at a point in the middle of Oaks-Lane, opposite to the middle of the south-eastern end of a certain lane leading to Lover's-walk." It is unclear exactly where Lover's walk was, but it is possibly what is now known as Chase Lane (footpath 97) which runs from Oaks Lane, across the London Underground line from Newbury Park station, and on to Perkins Road. (Note: Chase Lane, p 25, 92)

== Scouting ==
The area has various links to Scouting from the 1930s to the present day.

=== Chief Scout ===
The earliest link to Scouting, albeit quirky, was in the 1930s when new houses to the south were built by the Rowallan family. Lord Rowallan was Chief Scout at the time.

=== 1st Aldborough Hatch (St. Peter's) Scout Group ===
The Group was formed in the early 1930s, but in 1939, when many young men went to war, it closed. In 1946, Archie Titmarsh (known to all as Mr T), a lay Reader in St. Peter's Church, called the choir boys together and asked them if they wanted to be Scouts or Boys' Brigade. They opted to be Scouts and the 1st Aldborough Hatch (St. Peter's) Scout Group was reformed.

=== 2nd Aldborough Hatch Scout Group ===
The Scout Group was formed in the mid-20th century and existed for several years. They met in the 'white hut' that was on the corner of Oaks Lane where Chase Lane starts. The hut later became the headquarters of the local Salvation Army. The site is now the location of the Newbury Park Islamic Cultural Centre and mosque. (Note: 2nd Aldborough Hatch Scout Group, p 91)

=== General Editor of the Scout Association ===
Ron Jeffries was born in 1933 in King George Hospital, and spent virtually all of his life in Aldborough Hatch. He became Cub Scout Leader in 1956 and then Scout leader in 1963 of the 1st Aldborough Hatch (St. Peter's) Scout Group. He took up the post of Assistant District Commissioner for Leader Training in 1967. In 1968, with Rex Hazlewood due to retire, he was appointed as General Editor of the Scout Association, a position he held until 1979. The Scout magazine had ceased publication in 1966 and in 1971 he changed the name of The Scouter magazine to Scouting to give it a wider appeal. In April 1979, during his final year as editor, the Chief Scout Sir William Gladstone presented him with the Silver Acorn for his services to the Association. He also wrote several books on Scouting. He died on 15 December 2020, in King George Hospital.

=== Hargreaves Campsite ===
Hargreaves campsite in Hainault Road opened in the 1950s. It has a Scout Shop.

== St. Chad's Well ==
St. Chad's Well was in Billet Road and was named after the patron saint of medicinal wells, St. Chad. It was said to be of great benefit to those suffering from affliction of the eyes. A memorial tablet was placed at the site by Ilford Borough Council as part of the Festival of Britain commemorations. (Note: St. Chad's Well, p 81)

== Dick Turpin public house ==
The original Dick Turpin was a beerhouse in one of the Aldborough Hall Farm cottages which are believed to date back to the 16th century. The census in 1861 lists a beer house keeper and his family. The cottages burned down in a fire in September 1966. In 1912 the current building opened selling Mann, Crossman and Paulin beer. The Dick Turpin name was removed in 2006 when it became a Miller & Carter restaurant, but was reinstated in 2011 after a campaign. (Note: The Dick Turpin, p 76 - 79)

=== Cuckoo Hall ===
Captain Williams lived in a house in a walled garden in 1777. This was probably the Old Clock House, demolished in the early 19th century, apart from the red brick garden walls with gabled coping and a former gazebo with a hip tiled roof. (Note: Cuckoo Hall, p 80)

== Solvay Society Brewery ==
The Solvay Society Brewery relocated from north London to the Cuckoo Brewery at Aldborough Hall Farm in 2016. The brewery was formerly the Ha'penny Brewery set up by Gavin Happé and Chris Penny in 2009. The Solvay Society, owned by Roman Hochuli, brew Belgian beers with a twist. The brewery is called the Cuckoo Brewery because Cuckoo Hall used to be next to the farm and not because it is a cuckoo brewery in the normal sense. In early 2021 they relocated to a railway arch in London E11, and ceased brewing towards the end of 2022.
