= Arthur Ashpitel =

British architect

Arthur Ashpitel (1807–1869) was an English architect. He trained under his father, William Hurst Ashpitel before setting up his own practice in 1842, and working in partnership with John Whichcord Jr. between 1850 and 1855. Ashpitel's works include the churches of St Barnabas, Homerton and St John the Evangelist, Blackheath.

== Life ==
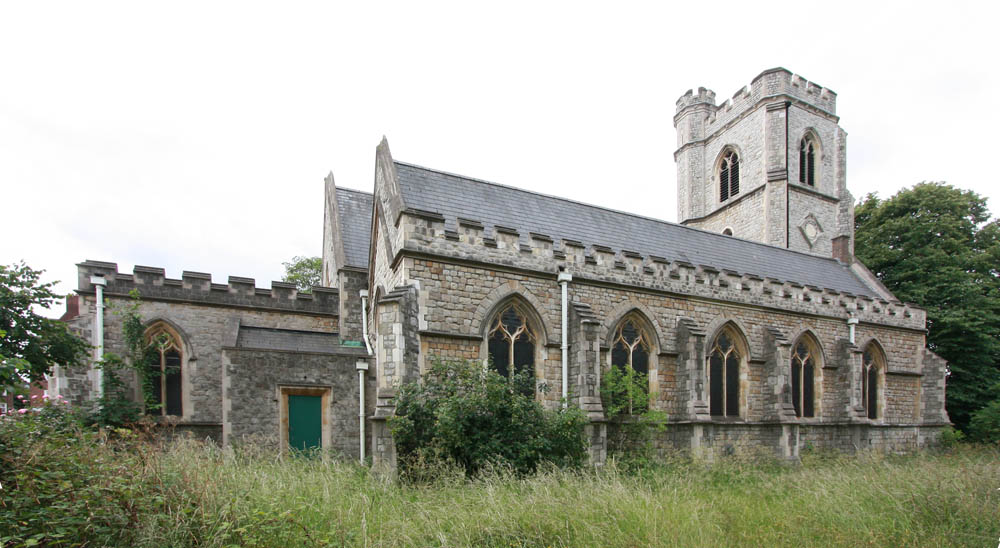
Ashpitel's church of St Barnabas at Homerton

=== Early years ===
Ashpitel was born in Hackney, London in 1807, the son of architect William Hurst Ashpitel. He was educated at Dr. Burnet's school in Hackney (see Sutton House, London) and trained as an architect under his father, but two childhood accidents damaged his health, and he did not set up in practice until 1842. One of his first projects was the redevelopment of a site in Houndsditch for Andrew Kennedy Hutchison, on which he built the Hutchison Markets, the Palace Tavern, and between 40 and 50 houses. In 1845 he built the church of St Barnabas at Homerton, a Gothic Revival design in Kentish ragstone, fitted, unusually for the date, with gas lighting. He later added a parsonage, a north aisle and a vestry.

=== Partnership with John Whichcord Jr. ===
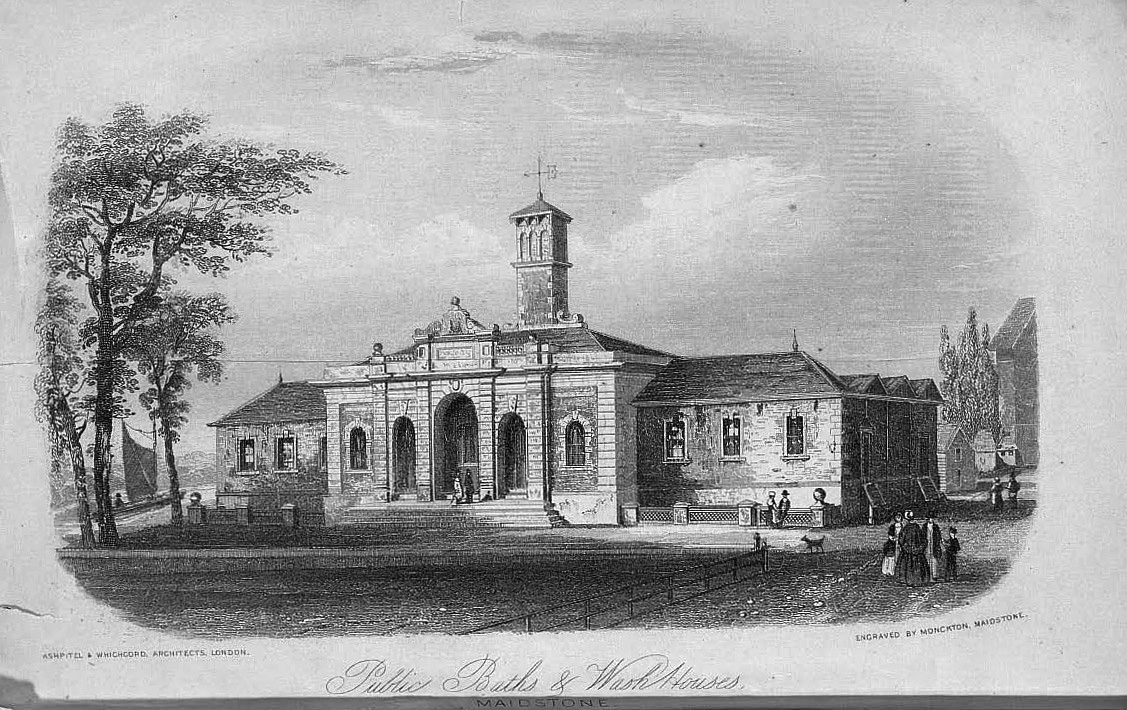
"Maidstone baths", a plate from Ashpitel's Observations on Baths and Wash-houses (1851)

In 1850 he entered into partnership with John Whichcord Jr. Together they designed and superintended the erection of baths and washhouses at Swansea, Maidstone, Lambeth, and elsewhere, and published a pamphlet entitled Observations on Baths and Wash-houses (1851) They also designed churches, private houses, and the Ophthalmic Hospital and Kent Infirmary at Maidstone. They turned their attention to the improvement of dwellings for the labouring classes, and, for a committee, erected a block of dwellings for artisans at Lambeth. They promoted the idea of living in flats in a publication called Town Dwellings: an essay on the erection of fireproof houses in flats. Ashpitel was also responsible for design of the "Wellington Testimonial" a clock tower erected at the southern end of London Bridge in 1854, but removed soon after as an obstruction to traffic. Its truncated remains are now at Swanage in Dorset. At Blackheath he built St John the Evangelist's Church (1852).

=== Later career ===
In 1853 he left England in the company of David Roberts, R.A., and lived for some time in Rome. An attack of malaria, suffered in Piedmont further damaged his health. In 1855, he dissolved the partnership with Whichcord, but continued to accept commissions.

In 1854 he restored the chapel of a former leper hospital at Great Ilford for the Rev. James Reynolds, with whom he had been to school, adding a porch, and a residence, and in 1858 and wrote a history of the building. In 1861 he designed a Venetian Gothic facade for a public house in Red Cross Street in the City of London, described by Wyatt Papworth as "probably the first attempt to render the mediaeval style appropriate for such a business". In 1861 he rebuilt St Mary's Church, Ripple, Kent, on its original Norman foundations, in a Romanesque style, in imitation of St. Nicholas, Barfreston. He also restored Sutton Church, about a mile away, adding an apse, its windows once again copied from those at Barfreston. In 1862 he built the church at Aldborough Hatch in Essex.

In 1864 he built schools accommodating 700 children for the district of Holy Trinity, Hoxton, at a cost of about £3000. In 1865 he rebuilt the tower and spire of Great Ilford Church and two years later elaborated and enlarged the plain brick church (erected in about 1825), inserting new windows and creating a polygonal chancel and adding a parsonage, all his works there being in a Venetian Gothic style. His last work was a design for twelve almshouses at Clewer, near Windsor, built at the cost of one of his sisters; they were constructed after his death under the supervision of John Whichcord.

He also designed the ornament cast on the Westminster Bell, known as " Big Ben" and assisted E. M. Barry in researching his design for the new Charing Cross.

Following his Roman studies he exhibited two drawings at the Royal Academy, a Restoration of Ancient Rome, and Rome As It Is. They were exhibited at the Royal Academy in 1858 and 1859 respectively, and were reproduced as chromolithographs, with an explanatory pamphlet.

=== Writings ===
Ashpitel was a prolific writer who contributed to magazines and to the transactions of learned societies and is known to have been a Fellow of the Society of Antiquaries of London. He first appeared in print at the age of sixteen, with a poem published in The Literary Magnet. In 1836 he published The Reign of Humbug: a Satire and in 1841 a pamphlet. A few Facts on the Corn Laws, defending the agricultural interest. He revised Peter Nicholson's Carpenter's New Guide and several other professional works for the publisher John Weale. He contributed biographies of architects to the Encyclopædia Britannica, and papers to the Royal Institute of British Architects, and was a regular contributor to Notes and Queries and the Owl.

=== Death ===
Ashpitel died in Westminster, London on 18 January 1869, having left a valuable collection of vases and books to the Society of Antiquaries of London (which still remain part of its Library collection), and his two drawings of Rome to the nation; they are now in the collection of the Victoria and Albert Museum.

He left monies for an annual architectural award in his name: the Ashpitel Prize.
