= Restless Beings =

UK-based human rights charity

- Formation: 31 October 2007
- Founder: Rahima Begum; Mabrur Ahmed
- Type: Human rights charity
- Headquarters: London, England
- Board of directors: Rahima Begum; Mabrur Ahmed
- Website: www.restlessbeings.org

Restless Beings is a UK-based non-profitable, non-political, international grassroots human rights charity.

== Premise ==
Restless Beings was founded by Rahima Begum and Mabrur Ahmed on 31 October 2007 and launched on 1 May 2008. It is an international grassroots human rights charity that aims to support marginalised communities that are deprived of media or public attention.

Its focus has been to ensure most unheard, marginalised communities, silenced and forgotten communities are brought to the forefront and a global understanding of the problems they are experiencing and the roots of their struggle. The organisation is not affiliated with any political organisation and is run by an in-house team of volunteers made up of students and professionals. They have links and contacts with small NGO's across the world.

== Projects ==
Restless Beings' projects are holistic in operation and work towards self-sufficiency. Their first project is working with the street children in Dhaka, Bangladesh who are exposed to drugs, trafficking, prostitution and poverty to provide them education, nutrition, accommodation, medical aid, vocational support and psychological counselling. Their second project in Kyrgyzstan, where they began a partnership with a women's rights organisation based in Bishkek to provide support to victims of ala kachuu (bride kidnapping), domestic violence and any other women's rights issues through a helpline and a crisis centre. Their third project is the human rights violations of the Rohingya refugees in Burma who are being ethnic cleansed and living with acts of abuse by the Burmese junta. Their fourth project is to combat prejudice and for the rights of Roma Gypsy travellers who are pushed to the sidelines across Europe.

Their support for the persecuted Rohingya people in Burma as well as women's rights in Kyrgyzstan received particular praise and attention of the international media and world opinion.

== External ==
- Official website
