= Carshalton Boys Sports College =

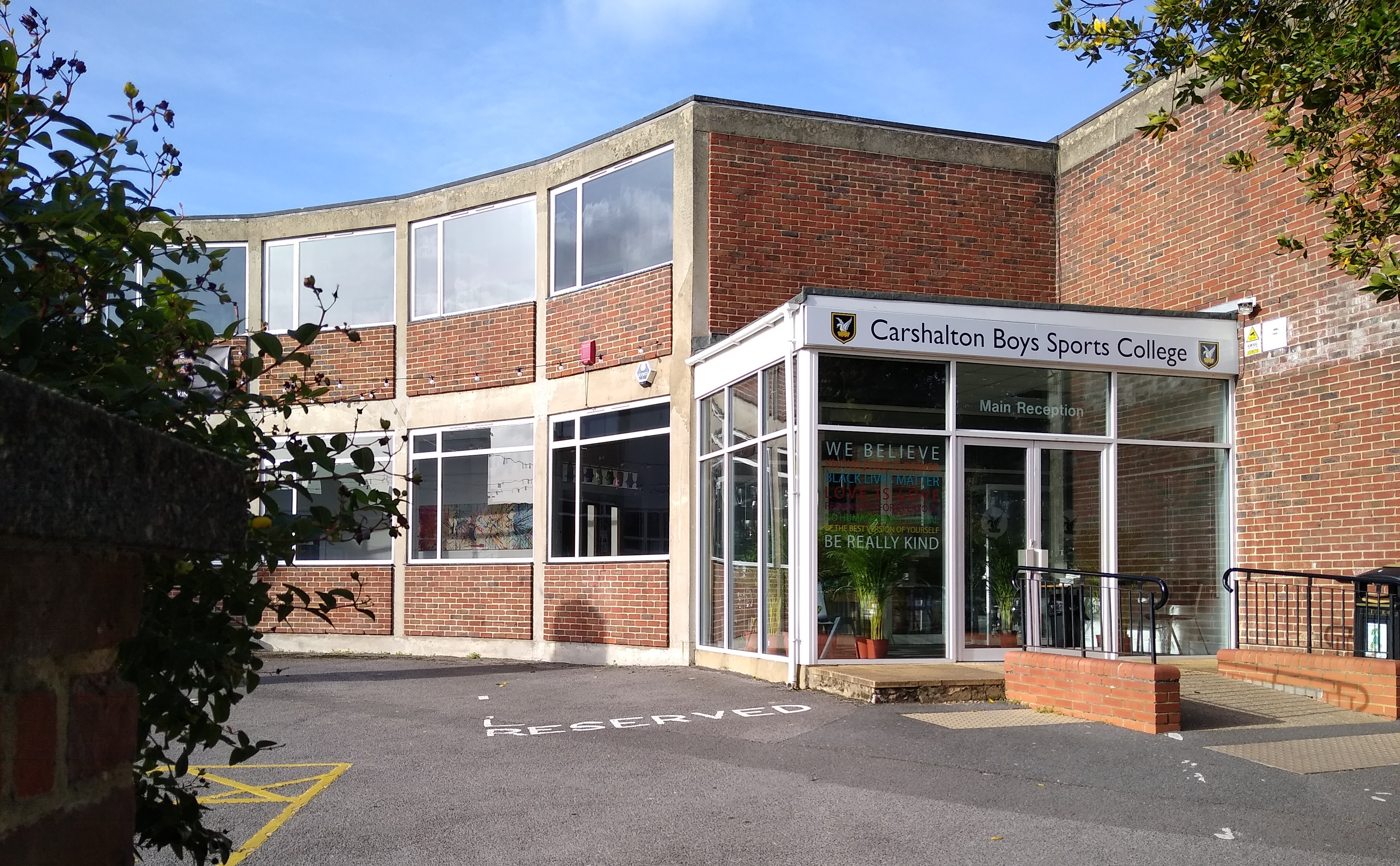

Location
- Winchcombe Road; Carshalton, Surrey, SM5 1RW; England; 51.37767°N 0.17487°W

Information
- Type: Academy
- Department for Education URN: 136799 Tables
- Ofsted: Reports
- Head teacher: Simon Barber
- Gender: Boys (coeducational during Sixth Form)
- Age: 11 to 19
- Houses: Attenborough, Churchill, Elgar, Fleming, Masefield, Nuffield, Pankhurst, Rutherford, Sinclair, Weir
- Colours: Turquoise, Blue, Yellow, White, Green, Brown, Purple, Red, Orange, Pink
- Website: http://www.carshaltonboys.org/

Carshalton Boys Sports College (formerly Carshalton High School for Boys) is an academy school that educates around 1,500 boys aged 11–19 years old. The school also has a coeducational sixth form. It is situated on the southern edge of the St Helier local authority Housing Estate within the boundaries of Carshalton, London Borough of Sutton, England.

In September 2003, the school was designated as a specialist sports college. As of 2011, the school has converted to academy status, but continues to have sport as a specialism. The school was rated 'Good' by Ofsted at its inspection in October 2022.

== Notable former pupils ==
- Major-General Edward Robert Festing CB FRS (1839–1912), army officer, chemist, and first Director of the Science Museum, London
- Alex Stepney, former Manchester United and England goalkeeper, 1968 European Cup winner.
- Neal Ardley, former Wimbledon FC player and AFC Wimbledon manager.
- Elliot Colburn, Member of Parliament for Carshalton and Wallington from 2019 to 2024.
- Dylan Adjei-Hersey, professional footballer, previously played for AFC Wimbledon and Hungerford Town.
- George Merrick, professional rugby union player for US Carcassonne.

== See also ==
- Carshalton High School for Girls
- List of schools in Sutton
