= Carshalton High School for Girls =

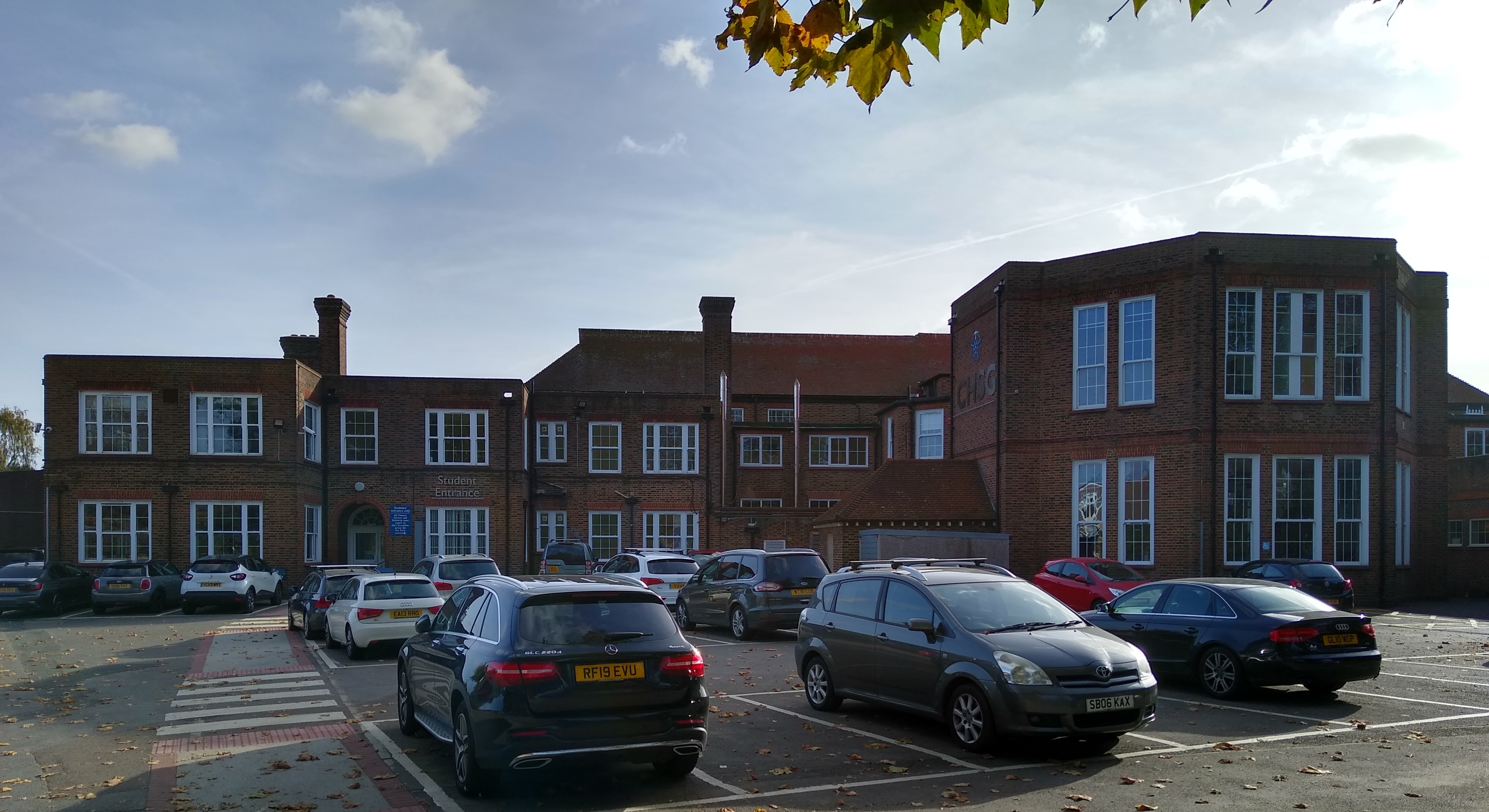

Location
- West Street; Carshalton, London, SM5 2QX; England; 51.36963°N 0.16927°W

Information
- Type: Academy
- Motto: Community, Harmony, Success, Growth
- Specialists: Arts and humanities
- Department for Education URN: 136797 Tables
- Ofsted: Reports
- Head teacher: Peter Baumann-Winn
- Gender: Girls
- Age: 11 to 18
- Houses: Red House, Yellow House, Green House and Blue House.
- Colour: Navy Blue
- Website: http://www.chsg.org.uk/

Carshalton High School for Girls is an academy school for 11- to 18-year-old girls in Carshalton, Sutton, England. The headteacher is Peter Baumann-Winn

It is a popular school, and has achieved many awards for efforts from both students and staff. There are many resources for students at the school, including a drama and dance studio and a brand new Sixth Form common room. In January 2011, the school was inspected by Ofsted. They were named as a 'Good School with Outstanding Features'. They were also granted Academy Status in June 2011, along with other schools in Sutton, including Carshalton Boys Sports College.

Carshalton High School for Girls is commonly known as CHSG and has recently celebrated 50 years of being a girls school. It used to be a mixed school.

There is a small display in the entrance to the library which shows some of the equipment the school used to have such as an attendance book.

The school has specialisms in the arts and humanities.

== See also ==
- Carshalton Boys Sports College
- List of schools in Sutton
