= William Hurst Ashpitel =

English architect

William Hurst Ashpitel (1776–1852) was an English architect.

== Life ==
Ashpitel was a pupil of Daniel Asher Alexander. He assisted Alexander in the designs for the London Docks, and in the execution of the works connected with that undertaking. Afterwards a pupil of John Rennie the Elder, he was largely concerned in the Kennet and Avon canal, and in the work of tunnelling under the city of Bath.

He later went into partnership with James Savage, and eventually set up in practice on his own account. The buildings he designed included Sir Charles Talbot's house at Deepdene. He left his profession rather early in life, and died 20 April 1852.

His son Arthur Ashpitel was also an architect, and a writer on architectural subjects.
