= Barking Park =

Park in Barking, London, England

Coordinates: 51.545°N 0.088°E

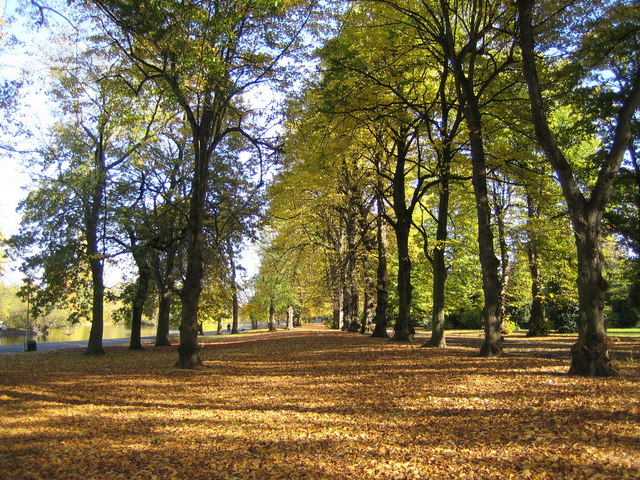
- Interactive map of Barking Park
- Type: Urban park
- Location: Barking
- Area: 30 hectares (74 acres)
- Opened: 9 April 1898
- Manager: Barking and Dagenham Council

Barking Park is a public park covering 30 hectares to the northeast of Barking town centre in east London. It was opened as the Recreation Ground in 1898 by the Barking Town Urban District Council and is now the oldest public park in the London Borough of Barking and Dagenham. It lies north of Longbridge Road and south of the neighbourhood of Loxford, with the northern boundary of the park along Loxford Water also the borough boundary with Redbridge.

== History ==
The classic Victorian park for the urban district of Barking Town was established from land acquired in 1896. It was officially opened on 9 April 1898 by Councillor C. L. Beard JP, Chairman of Barking Town Urban District Council.

The park's most significant feature is a 910-metre (2,990 ft) long boating lake on the north side of the park. Rowing boats were introduced first, and then on 1 April 1953, motor boats and a Mississippi style paddle steamer called Phoenix II made their debut. The paddle steamer continued to operate on the lake until 1967.

The park contains a war memorial, renovated in 2000, for men of the Barking Town Urban District who fell in World War I and World War II.

A lido was built in 1931 but this was closed permanently in 1988. The longstanding park cafe was demolished and a roller-skating park built on the site.

In 2006 the council received stage one funding from the Heritage Lottery Fund to develop a proposal for restoration and improvement of the park. Funding of over £3 million was approved, and works were completed between 2010 and 2012, including two lengthy new pathways, a children's play area and splash park.

== Features ==
Facilities include tennis and basketball courts, two bowling greens (indoor and outdoor), a children's playground, a waterpark, football pitches and a flower garden. It is designated as metropolitan open land, which provides a high level of protection from development.

=== Barking Park Light Railway ===
Barking Park Light Railway
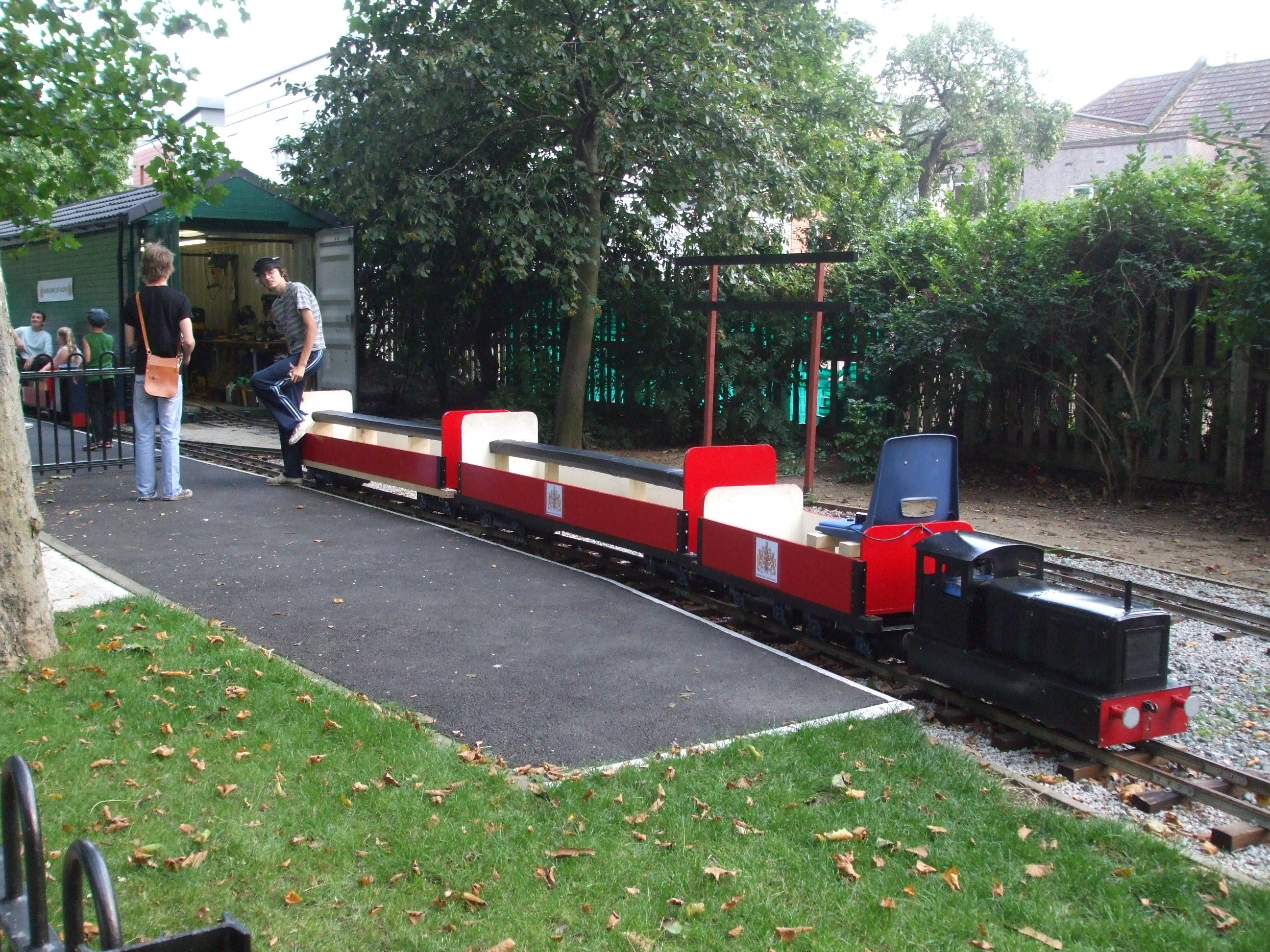

Overview
- Locale: The Park Lodge, Longbridge Road, Barking, East London
- Dates of operation: early 1950s – 2005; 2008 - 2024?–

Technical
- Track gauge: 7 1/4 in (184 mm)
- Previous gauge: 9 1/2 in (241 mm)
- Length: 340 metres (1,120 ft)

Other
- Website: www.facebook.com/BPLR2016/

Barking Park Light Railway, a miniature passenger railway, opened in the early 1950s. It originally consisted of three coaches hauled by a steam locomotive named "The Empress", running over a length of 9 1/2 in (241 mm) gauge track, from the main park entrance at Longbridge Road to a turntable at the boating lake. After being replaced by a sit-in diesel locomotive named "Little Nan", The Empress was eventually restored and re-gauged to 10 1/4 in (260 mm) and is now running at the Eastleigh Lakeside Steam Railway.

About halfway along the line, trains went through a gated level crossing. When trains were not running, the level crossing afforded access to the park from the adjacent Park Avenue, but this side entrance was eventually permanently closed and the level crossing removed.

The railway ran until 2005 when it was closed by the owner, who felt that it was no longer cost effective to maintain and repair the train; however, the railway has since been redeveloped by a father & son team who bought the line from the previous owner. It featured new trains, and new 7 1/4 in (184 mm) gauge track, with wheelchair-friendly station access. The new train service ran a few times during 2008 but the official grand re-opening took place at Easter in 2009.

== Events ==
Every year on Remembrance Day (usually the 2nd Sunday in November) a commemorative ceremony is held at the war memorial preceded by music from a local marching band.

Barking parkrun takes place in the park every Saturday morning at 9am.
