= Wellington clock tower =

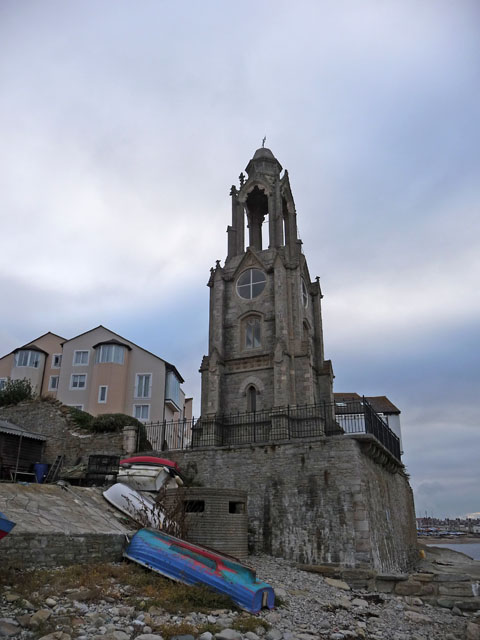
- Interactive map of Wellington clock tower
- Location: Swanage, Dorset
- Coordinates: 50.6075°N 1.9479°W
- Built: 1854
- Built for: Commissioners for Lighting the West Division of Southwark
- Demolished: 1867
- Rebuilt: 1868
- Architect: Arthur Ashpitel
- Architectural style: Perpendicular Gothic

Listed Building – Grade II
- Official name: The Clock Tower
- Designated: 26 June 1952
- Reference no.: 1304394

The Wellington clock tower is a structure that stands on the seafront at Swanage in Dorset, England. It was originally built by the Commissioners for Lighting the West Division of Southwark at the southern end of London Bridge in 1854. It was intended as a memorial to the recently deceased Arthur Wellesley, 1st Duke of Wellington, though funds proved insufficient to provide a statue of the man at the top of the tower, as had been originally intended. It housed a clock with four faces that were illuminated from within and a small telegraph office. Within 10 years the structure was overshadowed by the construction of nearby railway structures and became an obstruction to traffic using the bridge. It was disassembled in 1867.

The structure was saved by the Swanage-based contractor George Burt and shipped back to his hometown, without the clock mechanism. He gifted it to fellow contractor Thomas Docwra who erected it in the grounds of his house at Peveril Point. Later owners removed the spire in 1904, though the structure remains a prominent landmark in the town and was granted grade II protection as a listed building in 1952.

== London Bridge ==
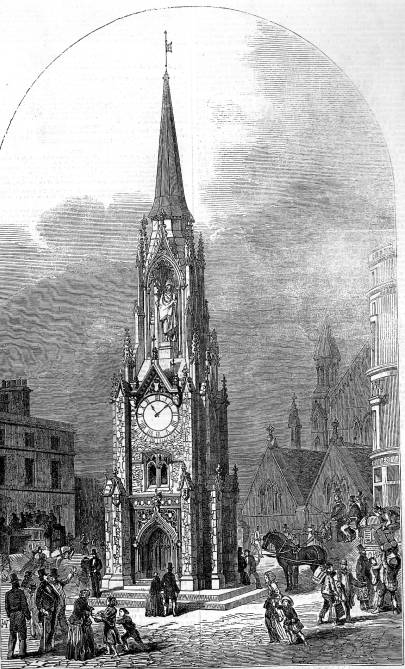
A drawing showing the original design and site of the Wellington clock tower (including the statue of Wellington) from the Illustrated London News of 17 June 1854

The Wellington clock tower was constructed as a memorial to the Arthur Wellesley, 1st Duke of Wellington, the former British Army general and politician who died in 1852. It was funded by a public subscription and contributions from railway companies organised by the Commissioners for Lighting the West Division of Southwark. A design was drawn up by the Arthur Ashpitel in the Perpendicular Gothic style (the Gothic Revival was popular in English architecture of this period). The tower as built had three levels, square in plan. The lower two levels were enclosed by walls and the uppermost level, within which a statue of Wellington was to stand, left open. One face of the lowest (ground) level contained a door with an ogee canopy, the other three faces contained a single arch window in the centre. The second level (first floor) had an arched window on each face, above which were circular apertures for the clock faces, surmounted by crocketted gables. The faces were transparent to allow the clock to be lit from within the tower. The uppermost level comprised four piers (one at each corner of the structure) atop which are trefoil cusped arches which supported a spire. The structure is buttressed in the double angled style in which a buttress support stands on either side of the external corners (making eight in total). The buttresses are also topped with crockets.

The tower was to be sited at the end southern end of London Bridge and the foundation stone was laid on 17 June 1854 by T. B. Simpson, treasurer to the Commissioners. The tower was completed within 6 months, although the money raised proved insufficient to provide the statue, as originally intended. The clock in the tower had been made by Bennett of Blackheath for the 1851 Great Exhibition and Bennett promised to maintain the clock for the remainder of his life. Owing to the vibrations from the heavy passing traffic the clock proved unreliable. The room in the lower portion of the tower found use as a telegraph office.

The tower was overshadowed by the construction of the Charing Cross to London Bridge railway and the 1863 Waterloo East viaduct, which detracted from its aesthetic. It was later condemned by the Metropolitan Police as an obstruction to traffic using the bridge and it was demolished in 1867.

== George Burt ==
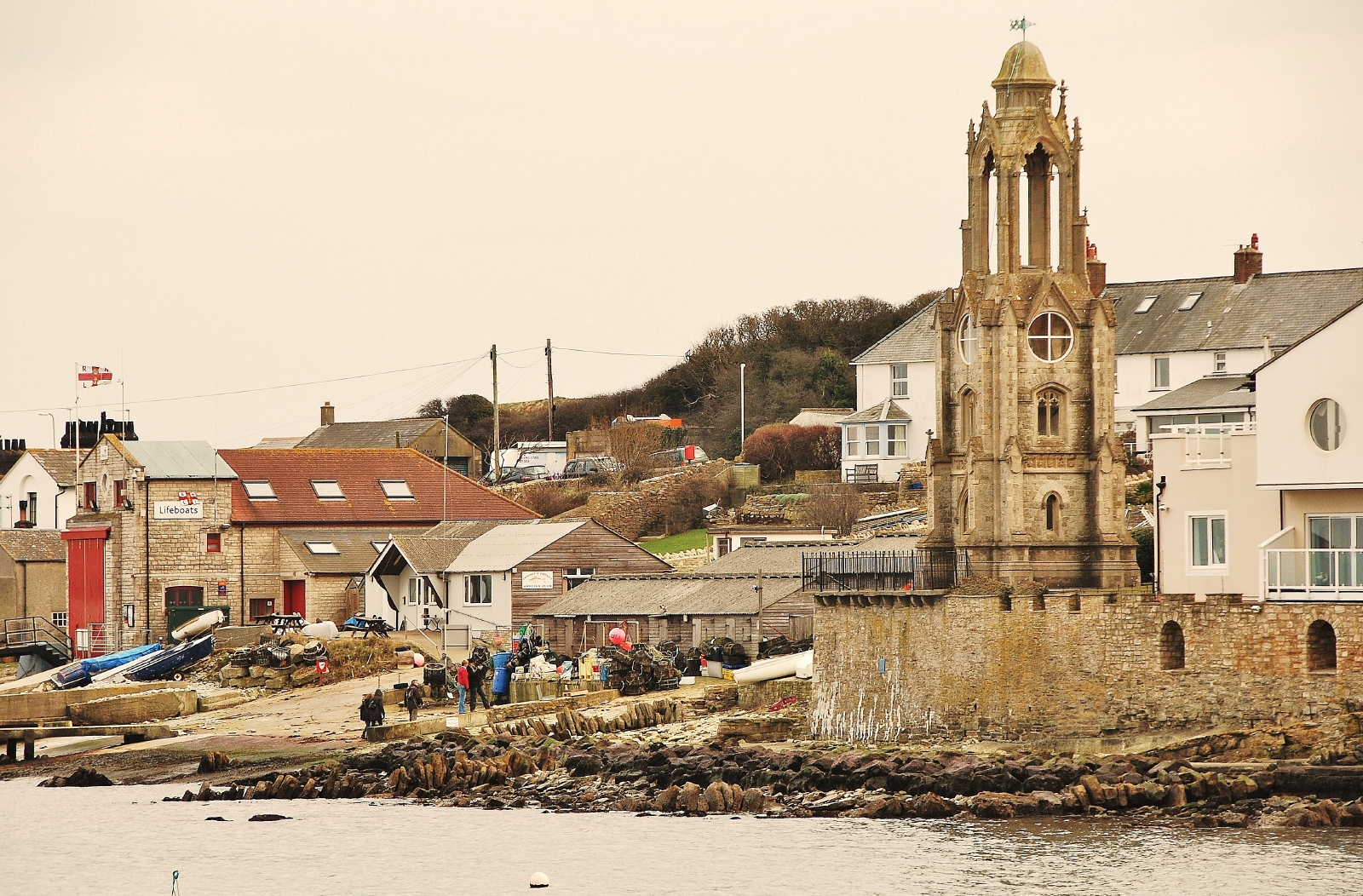

George Burt was a building contractor from Swanage, who managed his uncle's construction firm Mowlem. Under Burt's control the firm carried out work on prominent buildings in London. Many of these were built with Purbeck stone shipped by barge from Swanage harbour. The barges required ballast to stabilise them for the return journey and Burt used material salvaged from buildings demolished in the capital, re-erecting many of them in his hometown. Even today, many of the Swanage's traffic bollards and lamp posts were originally used in London and the façade of its town hall was originally Christopher Wren's 17th-century Mercers' Hall.

== Re-erection in Swanage ==
The fabric of the Wellington clock tower was acquired by Burt and transported to Swanage as ballast in his ship Mayflower. He presented the tower as a house warming gift to his friend and fellow contractor Thomas Docwra. Docwra rebuilt the tower in the eastern portion of his residence, The Grove on Peveril Point, in 1868. The work cost Docwra as much as it had cost to build the tower in London. He commemorated the completion of the work by having his initials and the year engraved on the base of the tower, which are still visible today. The tower's clock did not accompany it to Swanage and its four faces were replaced with circular windows.

The spire was removed in 1904 for unknown reasons, possibly due to storm damage and possibly because the then owners - who were fervent Christians - found it sacrilegious. It was replaced by an ogee-shaped copper cupola. This was criticised by architectural experts and the resulting structure was described as incongruous with its setting. In 1907 The Antiquary magazine stated that "the first sight one sees on sailing into Swanage Harbour" is the Wellington clock tower. The structure was granted protection as a grade II listed building on 26 June 1952.

The Wellington clock tower remains a prominent landmark in Swanage. A photographic survey and condition report of the structure was carried out in September 2015 to serve as a baseline and to assist in identifying any structural problems.
