= Oakes Park =

Oakes Park may refer to:

- Oakes Park, Sheffield, an English country house
- Oakes Park, Niagara Falls, a park in Niagara Falls, Ontario, Canada

== See also ==
- Oaks Park
