= Loxford =

Area of Ilford, London, England

Coordinates: 51.54807°N 0.08184°E

- Location within Greater London
- Population: 16,544 (2011Census. Ward)
- OS grid reference: TQ444852
- London borough: Redbridge
- Ceremonial county: Greater London
- Region: London
- Country: England
- Sovereign state: United Kingdom
- Post town: ILFORD
- Postcode district: IG1
- Dialling code: 020
- Police: Metropolitan
- Fire: London
- Ambulance: London
- London Assembly: Havering and Redbridge

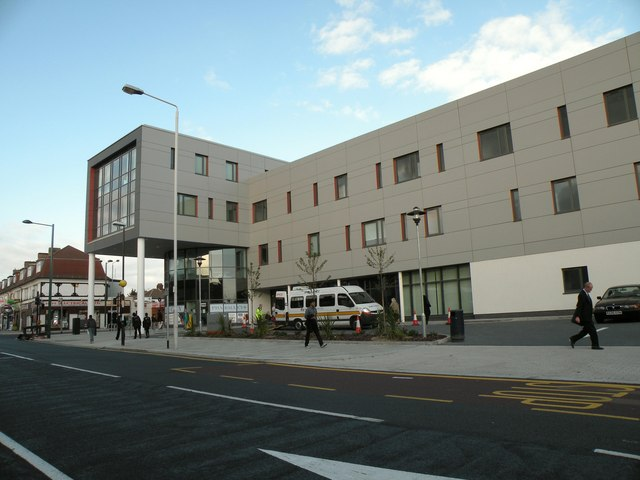
Loxford Polyclinic on Ilford Lane

Loxford is an area of Ilford in the London Borough of Redbridge in east London, UK. It is a built-up, multi-ethnic locality.

== History ==
The medieval manor of Loxford was in the possession of Barking Abbey and in 1319 the Abbess of Barking was licensed to fell oaks in Hainault Forest to rebuild her house here after a fire. The present Loxford Hall dates from about 1830 and was enlarged around 1860. The terraced street plan of the Loxford Hall estate was laid out at the end of the nineteenth century as one of a cluster of developments that filled southern Ilford with relatively small and cheap houses. The first Loxford schools were opened in 1904. Loxford School is a new building replacing a secondary school. The Loxford Practice Loxford Polyclinic] – the first purpose-built – opened in 2009. It is the location of Loxford Water, a tributary of the River Roding that forms the northern boundary of Barking Park. Loxford Hall now serves as a child and family consultation centre for the North East London Foundation Trust. Loxford's main ethnic groups are white, Pakistani and Indian. Ilford Lane has heavy South Asian influences.

== Demographics ==
The Loxford ward of the London Borough of Redbridge has one of the highest numbers of individuals of Pakistani descent in London at 28.4%, forming the ward's largest ethnic group. The next largest ethnic groups in the 2011 census were Indian (15.6%), Other Asian (10.4%) and White British (10.2%).

The most common religion in Loxford in the 2011 census was Islam, the faith of 46% of the population. This was followed by Christianity (24.5%) and Sikhism (5.6%).

== Location ==
Loxford is located between Ilford to the north and Barking to the south. Ilford Lane (A123 road) is the only main road in the area.

Next to Loxford School, a scheme of 159 new homes on the site of the old Hyleford Hostel and South Park Clinic was proposed by Redbridge Council. The hostel and clinic were demolished in 2023 and a housing estate is now being built on the site.

== Transport ==
There are no stations in the area but is served by the rapid bus transit East London Transit EL1 to Ilford and Barking Riverside, using Ilford Lane. The service shares the road and is not segregated, London Buses 169 and 366 also operates within the area. Loxford is connected to the National Road Network by the A123 Ilford Lane.
