= Oak Park High School =

Oak Park High School may refer to:

- Oak Park High School (California), Oak Park, California
- Oak Park High School (Michigan), Oak Park, Michigan
- Oak Park High School (Kansas City), Kansas City, Missouri
- Oak Park High School (Manitoba), Winnipeg, Manitoba
- Oak Park and River Forest High School, Oak Park, Illinois
- Oak Park High School (Mississippi) in Laurel, Mississippi, a school for African Americans that closed in 1970

== See also ==
- Oaks Park High School, Carshalton, England
- Oaks Park High School, Ilford, England
