= George Merrick (rugby union) =

English rugby union player

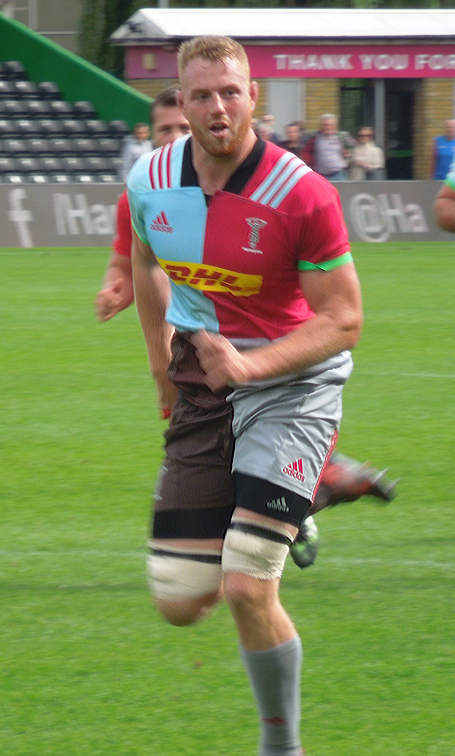
- Merrick in 2017
- Born: George Merrick; 4 October 1992 (age 34) Carshalton, London, England
- Height: 2.03 m (6 ft 8 in)
- Weight: 123 kg (19 st 5 lb)
- School: Carshalton Boys Sports College; Whitgift School

Rugby union career
- Position: Lock
- Current team: Tonbridge Juddians
Amateur team(s)
| Years | Team | Apps | (Points) |
- Mitcham & Carshalton RFC
Senior career
| Years | Team | Apps | (Points) |
| 2013–2019 | Harlequins | 100 | (15) |
| 2019–2020 | Clermont Auvergne | 11 | (5) |
| 2020–2021 | Worcester Warriors | 7 | (0) |
| 2021-2022 | Newcastle Falcons | 13 | (0) |
| 2022–2023 | Carcassonne | 13 | (0) |
| 2023-2024 | Chinnor | | |
| 2024- | Tonbridge Juddians | | |
- Correct as of 20 January 2019
International career
| Years | Team | Apps | (Points) |
| 2012 | England U20 | 8 | (0) |
- Correct as of 21 February 2016

George Merrick (born 4 October 1992) is a professional rugby union player.

Merrick made his senior debut for Harlequins against Wasps during the 2013 London Double Header held at Twickenham Stadium.

He was part of the England U20s squad that won the 2012 Six Nations Under 20s Championship. He then travelled to South Africa that same year for the 2012 IRB Junior World Championship.

On 4 January 2019, Merrick signed a two-year contract for Clermont lasting until 2021. However, after a season spent in France, Merrick chose to return to England to sign for Worcester Warriors back in the Premiership Rugby ahead of the 2020–21 season.

ON 1 December 2022, Merrick left Newcastle with immediate effect to return to France to join Carcassonne in the second-tier Pro D2 competition during the 2022–23 season.
