= List of schools in the London Borough of Sutton =

This is a list of schools in the London Borough of Sutton, England.

== State-funded schools ==
=== Primary schools ===
- Abbey Primary School
- All Saints Benhilton CE Primary School
- All Saints Carshalton CE Primary School
- Avenue Primary Academy
- Bandon Hill Primary School
- Barrow Hedges Primary School
- Beddington Infants' School
- Beddington Park Academy
- Brookfield Primary Academy
- Cheam Common Infants' Academy
- Cheam Common Junior Academy
- Cheam Fields Primary Academy
- Cheam Park Farm Primary Academy
- Culvers House Primary School
- Devonshire Primary School
- Dorchester Primary School
- Foresters Primary School
- Greenwrythe Primary School
- Hackbridge Primary School
- Harris Junior Academy Carshalton
- Highview Primary School
- Holy Trinity CE Junior School
- Manor Park Primary Academy
- Muschamp Primary School
- Nonsuch Primary School
- Robin Hood Infants' School
- Robin Hood Junior School
- Rushy Meadow Primary Academy
- St Cecilia's RC Primary School
- St Dunstan's Primary School
- St Elphege's RC Infants' School
- St Elphege's RC Junior School
- St Mary's RC Infants' School
- St Mary's RC Junior School
- Stanley Park Infants' School
- Stanley Park Junior School
- Tweeddale Primary School
- Victor Seymour Infants' School
- Wallington Primary Academy
- Westbourne Primary School
- Wood Field Primary School

=== Non-selective secondary schools ===
- Carshalton Boys Sports College
- Carshalton High School for Girls
- Cheam High School
- Glenthorne High School
- Greenshaw High School
- The John Fisher School*
- Oaks Park High School
- Overton Grange School
- St Philomena's Catholic High School for Girls

*This school is located in Croydon, but is administered by Sutton

=== Grammar schools ===
- Nonsuch High School for Girls
- Sutton Grammar School
- Wallington County Grammar School
- Wallington High School for Girls
- Wilson's School

=== Free schools ===
- Harris Academy Sutton

=== Special and alternative schools ===
- Carew Academy
- Link Primary School
- Link Secondary School
- The Limes College
- Sherwood Park School
- Sutton Tuition and Reintegration Service
- Wandle Valley Academy

=== Further education ===
- Carshalton College
- Sutton College
- Carshalton Athletic Academy

== Independent schools ==
=== Primary and preparatory schools ===
- Collingwood School
- Homefield Preparatory School
- Seaton House School

=== Senior and all-through schools ===
- Sutton High School

=== Special and alternative schools ===
- Brookways School
- Eagle House School
