= Rahima Begum =

English human rights activist

- রহিমা বেগম
- Born: 22 May 1984 (age 42)
- Education: University College London (MA Postcolonial History, Literature and Theory)
- Occupations: Human rights activist, researcher and artist
- Years active: 2007–present
- Title: Co-founder and co-director of Restless Beings
- Spouse: Mabrur Ahmed (m. 2013)

Rahima Begum (Bengali: রহিমা বেগম; born 22 May 1984) is an English human rights activist who is the co-founder of international human rights organisation Restless Beings, and an artist and researcher.

== Early life ==
Begum attended Plashet School until 2000 and then attended Seven Kings High School. She graduated with an MA in postcolonial history, literature and theory from University College London.

== Career ==
Begum worked as a researcher, illustrator and freelance artist. In October 2007, she co-founded Restless Beings with academic consultant Mabrur Uddin Ahmed (born 1983). Restless Beings is an international grassroots human rights organisation and registered UK charity that supports marginalised communities across the world. The organisation occupies the space between activism, advocacy and academia.

Begum has been outspoken and passionate about human rights from a young age. She has worked across the community from co-hosting and speaking at women's rights events, championing arts and human rights across the British Bangladeshi community, alongside work with media. She has mobilised civil society and spearheaded several national and international campaigns. In addition to this, Begum has consulted various think tanks, NGO/INGOs on how to better serve vulnerable communities as well as offered her assistance on policy shifting research projects. She is a panel expert, and has lectured on human rights both domestically and internationally (including at Berkeley California, London School of Economics, University of Columbia, New York University, Dhaka University, University of Malaysia, and other institutions).

Her work leading Restless Beings with Mabrur Ahmed and support for the persecuted Rohingya community in Burma as well as women's rights in Kyrgyzstan received particular praise and attention of the international media and world opinion.

In May 2014, Begum was interviewed by Nadia Ali on BBC Asian Network about the Rohingya migrant crisis.

== Personal life ==
On 27 August 2013, Begum married Restless Beings co-founder Mabrur Ahmed.

== See also ==
- British Bangladeshi
- List of British Bangladeshis

== External ==
- Rahima Begum on X
