= Cranbrook, London =

Coordinates: 51.568001°N 0.065532°E

Cranbrook
- Location within Greater London
- Population: 12,780 (2011 Census. Ward)
- OS grid reference: TQ431872
- London borough: Redbridge
- Ceremonial county: Greater London
- Region: London
- Country: England
- Sovereign state: United Kingdom
- Post town: ILFORD
- Postcode district: IG1
- Dialling code: 020
- Police: Metropolitan
- Fire: London
- Ambulance: London
- London Assembly: Havering and Redbridge

Cranbrook is a district of South Ilford in the London Borough of Redbridge. It has been entirely absorbed into the urban sprawl of Ilford, forming the area north of Ilford railway station. The name has its earliest use in 1233 as Cranebroc. It is named for a tributary of the River Roding, the Cran Brook.
