= Seven Kings =

Area in Ilford in Greater London, England

Coordinates: 51.56761°N 0.09791°E

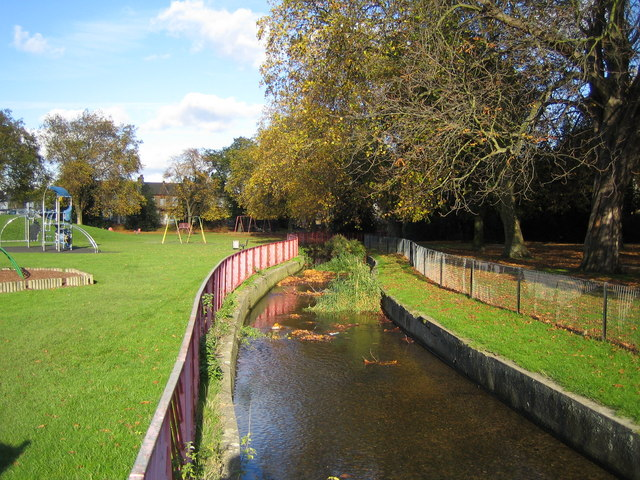
- Seven Kings - Westwood Recreation Ground

- Location within Greater London
- Population: 15,164 (2011 Census.Ward)
- OS grid reference: TQ455875
- London borough: Redbridge
- Ceremonial county: Greater London
- Region: London
- Country: England
- Sovereign state: United Kingdom
- Post town: ILFORD
- Postcode district: IG3
- Dialling code: 020
- Police: Metropolitan
- Fire: London
- Ambulance: London
- UK Parliament: Ilford South
- London Assembly: Havering and Redbridge

Seven Kings is an area of Ilford in Greater London, England, part of the London Borough of Redbridge. Situated approximately two miles (3.2 km) from Ilford town centre, Seven Kings forms part of the Ilford post town. Historically part of Essex, it was part of the Municipal Borough of Ilford until 1965 when it was incorporated into Greater London.

== History ==
The earliest recorded use of the name is as Sevekyngg or Sevekyngges in 1285, possibly meaning 'settlement of the family or followers of a man called Seofoca'.

Seven Kings has not historically formed a parish or other division; instead it was part of the Ilford ward of the ancient parish of Barking in the Becontree hundred of the county of Essex, which formed from 1894, the Ilford Urban District (later municipal borough). Seven Kings is situated next to the ancient Roman road between London and Colchester and was rapidly developed during the 19th century following construction of the Great Eastern Main Line railway.

In 1965, the Ilford parish and municipal borough were abolished by the London Government Act 1963, and the area of Essex including Seven Kings has since formed part of Greater London.

Sean Maguire comes from Seven Kings

== Education ==
Located in the immediate area are Mayfield High School, The Palmer Catholic Academy, Seven Kings School and Isaac Newton Academy secondary school. Primary schools in this area include Downshall Primary School, Farnham Green Primary School, South Park Primary School, Seven Kings Primary School, Isaac Newton Academy primary school, and Eastcourt Independent School.

== Transport ==
The area is served by Seven Kings railway station on the Great Eastern Main Line to/from Liverpool Street station. Train services are operated by the Elizabeth line.

The nearest London Underground station is Newbury Park on the Central line.

== Recreation ==
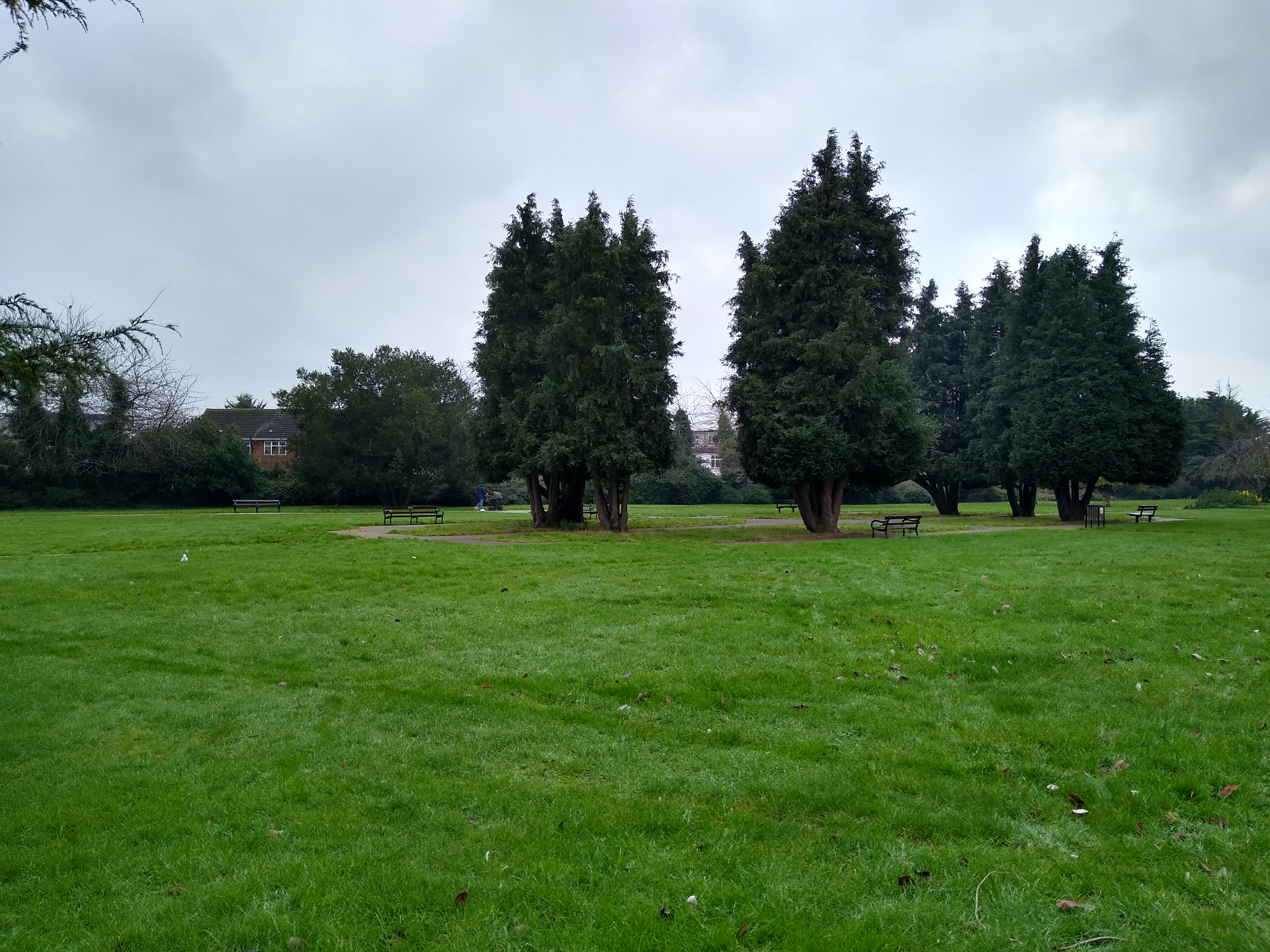
Seven Kings Park

The area contains many green spaces including Seven Kings Park, a large open space containing sports facilities such as tennis courts, cricket facilities, a sports ground, and a bandstand. There is also Westwood Park, a smaller open space and playground on Meads Lane. Thomas McCurtains GAA are based in Seven Kings Park.

== Demographics ==
In the Seven Kings ward of the London Borough of Redbridge, the largest ethnic group in the 2011 census were Indians who comprised 25.5% of the population. The next largest groups were White British at 16.4%, Pakistanis at 13.8%, and Bangladeshi at 9%.

The most popular religions were Islam and Christianity at 31.3% and 28.5% of the population respectively. This was followed by Sikhs and Hindus at 13.6% and 12.5% respectively.
