= IG postcode area =

Postcode area within the United Kingdom

Ilford
- Postcode area
- Coordinates: 51.587°N 0.072°E
- Country: United Kingdom
- Postcode area: IG
- Postcode area name: Ilford
- Post towns: 6
- Postcode districts: 11
- Postcode sectors: 35
- Postcodes (live): 5,979
- Postcodes (total): 10,011
- Statistics as at May 2020

The IG postcode area, also known as the Ilford postcode area, is a group of eleven postcode districts in England, within six post towns. These cover parts of eastern Greater London and south-west Essex.

== Postal administration ==
Inward mail for the area is sorted, along with mail for the E and RM postcode areas, at the Romford Mail Centre.

Chigwell and Buckhurst Hill are covered by Woodford Green Royal Mail Delivery Office

== Coverage ==
The area served includes much of the London Borough of Redbridge, the western part of the London Borough of Barking and Dagenham, and the southwestern part of the Epping Forest district of Essex, while the western part of IG8 and IG11 covers a small part of the London Borough of Waltham Forest, and the London Borough of Newham.

=== List of postcode districts ===
The approximate coverage of the postcode districts is as follows:

Postcode district	Post town	Coverage	Local authority area(s)
IG1	ILFORD	Ilford, Cranbrook, Loxford (part)	Redbridge
IG2	ILFORD	Gants Hill, Newbury Park, Aldborough Hatch	Redbridge
IG3	ILFORD	Seven Kings, Goodmayes	Redbridge
IG4	ILFORD	Redbridge	Redbridge
IG5	ILFORD	Clayhall	Redbridge
IG6	ILFORD	Fairlop, Barkingside, Chigwell, Hainault (south)	Redbridge
IG7	CHIGWELL	Chigwell, Chigwell Row, Hainault (north)	Epping Forest, Redbridge
IG8	WOODFORD GREEN	Woodford Green, Woodford Bridge, Highams Park (part)	Redbridge, Waltham Forest
IG9	BUCKHURST HILL	Buckhurst Hill	Epping Forest
IG10	LOUGHTON	Loughton, High Beach (part)	Epping Forest
IG11	BARKING	Barking, Barking Riverside, Beckton (part), Creekmouth, Loxford (part), Thames View, Upney	Barking and Dagenham, Newham, Redbridge

== Ilford campaign ==
In 2005, a local businessman named Wilson Chowdhry led a campaign for Ilford's IG1 postcode to be changed to E19. Although Ilford has been part of Greater London since 1965, it is not within the London post town. Chowdhry argued that the IG1 postcode confused customers, and that a London E postcode would help bring more business into Ilford. However, a Royal Mail spokesman said that the campaign had "virtually no hope" of succeeding, as postcodes are only changed for operational reasons.

A similar plea had been raised in the 1970s by Greater London Council politician Serge Lourie, and similarly rejected. Ilford had been part of the original E division of the London postal district from 1857 until 1866.

== Map ==
IG postcode area map, showing postcode districts in red and post towns in grey text, with links to nearby CM, DA, E, EN, RM and SE postcode areas.

== See also ==
- Postcode Address File
- List of postcode areas in the United Kingdom
