= Oak Park station =

Oak Park station may refer to:

- Oak Park railway station, Melbourne, Victoria, Australia
- Oak Park, Illinois, United States
  - Oak Park station (CTA Blue Line)
  - Oak Park station (CTA Green Line)
  - Oak Park station (Metra)
- Oak Park station (CTA Douglas branch), Berwyn, Illinois, United States
