= Ripple, Kent =

Village in Kent, England

Coordinates: 51.1965°N 1.3550°E

Ripple
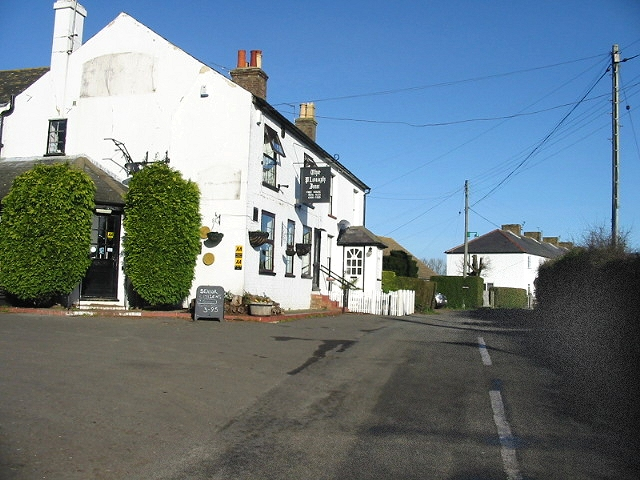
- The Plough Inn, Ripple

- Location within Kent
- Population: 372 2011 census
- OS grid reference: TR345465
- District: Dover
- Shire county: Kent
- Region: South East
- Country: England
- Sovereign state: United Kingdom
- Post town: DEAL
- Postcode district: CT14
- Dialling code: 01304
- Police: Kent
- Fire: Kent
- Ambulance: South East Coast
- UK Parliament: Dover and Deal

Ripple, also known as Ripple Vale, is a village and civil parish of Saxon origin Dover District of Kent, England and is the second smallest village in Kent.

Ripple Parish Church is dedicated to St Mary the Virgin; the village pub is The Plough.

In June 2024 the closure of the Plough was announced.

== History ==
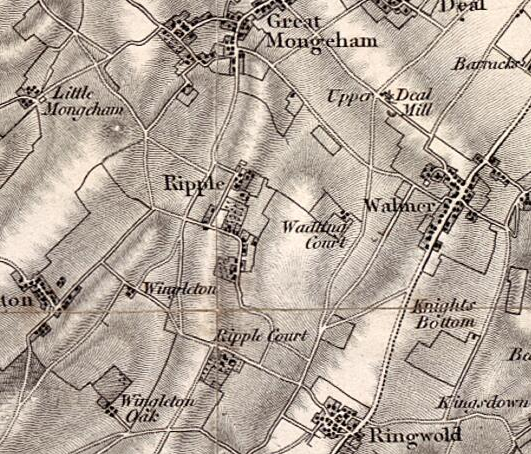
An 1816 map of Ripple

The meaning of the word Ripple, stems from Old English, meaning 'A strip of land'.

In the 1870s, Ripple was described as:

RIPPLE, a parish in Eastry district, Kent; near the coast, 2½ miles S W of Deal r. station. Post-town, Deal. Acres, 1, 134. Real property, £2, 676. Pop., 254. Houses, 51. The property is divided among a few. R. House, R. Court, and R. Vale are chief residences. Traces of a Roman entrenchment are a little to the N of the church; and another ancient entrenchment, anoblong of about ½ an acre, is called Dane Pits. The living is a rectory in the diocese of Canterbury. Value, £278.* Patron, J. A. Johnson, Esq. The church was rebuilt in 1861; is in a mixed style, chiefly Norman; and has a tower and spire.

The Roman earthworks were dug (near the site of the present church) during the invasion of Britain by Julius Caesar’s army which landed in Deal and camped here in 55BC.

John French, 1st Earl of Ypres, the commander of the first British Expeditionary Force in World War I was born there in 1852, and is buried at the village church. His sister Charlotte Despard, the suffragist, novelist and Sinn Féin activist, also lived in Ripple.

Ripple Primary School, the village's state school, closed in 2007 due to low attendance. Another school was also established in the parish, but was a specialised school for boys with Autism aged 6–18 years old and was named Ripplevale School.

== Demography ==
=== Population ===
According to the 2011 census there were 199 males and 173 females living in the parish totaling 372 people.

The population of Ripple from 1801 is seen to have fluctuated in numbers, from a population of 122 to a population of 265 in 1961. The parish of Ripple reached its highest population between 1801 and 1961, in 1911 with the population reaching 326. After this peak of population, it slowly started to decline but was on the rise again after 1951.The total population has risen considerably between 1801 and the last census of 2011, with there being a difference in population number of 250 people which is a large scale change.

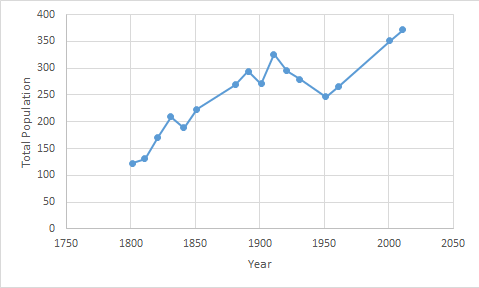
Total Population of Ripple from 1801 to 2011

=== Occupational structure ===
A chart showing the Occupational Structure of Ripple in 1881

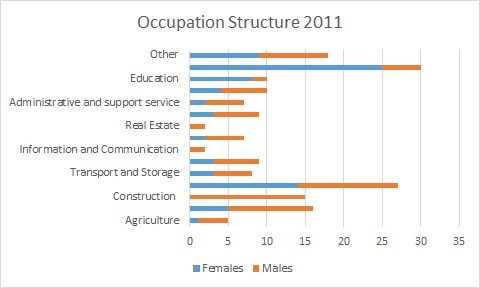
A chart showing the Occupational Structure of Ripple in 2011

The occupational structure from 1881 shows the different occupations that the residents of Ripple had adopted, with the majority being involved in the agricultural sector. Males are seen to have the highest number of people working in agriculture at 40 in comparison to females which had none recorded doing this job. The job role of agriculture is the most common occupation for males. The number of people with unknown occupations was higher for females at 51 compared to males at just 4 people, with it not being the social normality for women to have occupations in this decade which stems to the century of the Victorians, where many women had to stay at home to look after the children while the men went to work, for example on the farms. Their jobs could also be unofficial with them not wanting to have them recorded or even not fitting into a certain occupational role. The most common occupation for women that is officially titled was domestic service or offices, which could be considered to be a stereotypical job compared to others, with the tradition of women being subjected to housework and maternal duties naturally when getting married or being of a younger age to help out their mothers. When comparing the occupations of 1881 to the occupations from 2011, they are extremely different in roles with the 2011 statistics including more modern occupations such as technological and scientific jobs and also insurance and social security. The occupations also included construction, education and also agriculture in small amounts with just a small number of males (4 people) and females (1 person) partaking in this sector.

=== Ethnicity ===
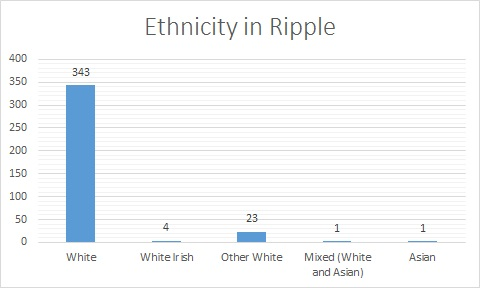
A graph showing the ethnicity of those living in Ripple

The ethnicity of those living in Ripple is varied with the majority of its residents (343 people) being White British/English/Scottish/Welsh/Northern Irish, and a small number being of other White ethnicity. The remaining number of residents is split into 4 White Irish, 1 Mixed Ethnicity of White and Asian, and 1 Asian as of 2011. The graph represents the ethnicity of Ripple in 2011 and is not representative of that in the 19th century.

== Education ==
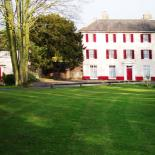
Ripplevale School

Ripplevale School, according to the school's stated history, occupies the previous ancestral family home of Sir John French, who was born at the house and buried in the parish. Following French family occupation the building became a preparatory school, and later a hotel, and an approved school. The present school, which opened in 1970, later absorbed the village primary school in Ripple. Ripplevale School, which teaches the National Curriculum, states in its brochure that it caters especially for pupils with special needs and autism within small classes, and provides for The Duke of Edinburgh's Award, Outward Bound, college-based training, and for contact with small animals in a smallholding. In 2017 Ofsted rated the school as Grade 2 'Good' overall and Grade 1 'Outstanding' in two areas.
