= Oaks Park High School, Carshalton =

Oaks Park High School

Location
- Damson Way; Carshalton; London, SM5 3HP; England; 51.35596°N 0.15858°W

Information
- Type: Academy
- Motto: Igniting a passion for learning
- Local authority: Sutton
- Trust: Cheam Academies Network
- Department for Education URN: 147538 Tables
- Ofsted: Reports
- Headteacher: Amit Amin
- Gender: Coeducational
- Age: 11 to 18
- Enrolment: 1179
- Website: https://www.oaksparkhigh.org.uk/

Oaks Park High School (formerly Stanley Park High School) is a coeducational secondary school and sixth form located in the Carshalton area of the London Borough of Sutton, England.

In 2012, the school moved to a new building in Damson Way, having previously been located in an older building on Stanley Park. It won the 2012 London Design Award for new build at the Education Business Award.

An OFSTED inspection from July 2013 rated the school with 'Requires Improvement' - although teaching, leadership and behaviour were rated 'Good'.

In 2014, teachers leading a school trip were accused of "fighting in front of the children and shouting offensive comments at each other". One parent reported that "There was another girl who wasn't very well on the trip and they couldn't find the teacher who had their medication because they had gone drinking". The school claimed that it had carried out a "thorough and detailed investigation".

The high school was named the "Best Secondary School" in the country in the Times Educational Supplement (TES) 2016 Awards. TES described the school as having achieved "remarkable outcomes for its student body by focusing on igniting their passion for learning." The judges were "impressed by the creative, ambitious and supportive culture fostered at Stanley Park". They noted: "At a time of huge pressure on schools, the submission from Stanley Park High made it obvious that the welfare and wellbeing of the children comes above anything else."

However, by 2018, the school had been listed as one of "England's worst schools" in the Daily Mirror, based on Department for Education data.

The school introduced a compulsory numberplate scheme for student cyclists in September 2018 which attracted widespread criticism. Olympian Chris Boardman said that the governors should step in, while Cycling UK described it as "part of a trend of head teachers trespassing on parental responsibilities". London Cycling Campaign described the measure as “bizarre” and “disproportionate”

The latest OFSTED report, from February 2019, rated the school as ‘inadequate’, the lowest rating available. Underachievement of pupils, inadequate teaching, poor management and substandard development for pupils were all highlighted, although the report also stated that recent changes in leadership had the potential to rectify the situation.

== See also ==
- List of schools in Sutton
