= Oaks Park High School, Ilford =

School in London, England

Oaks Park High School
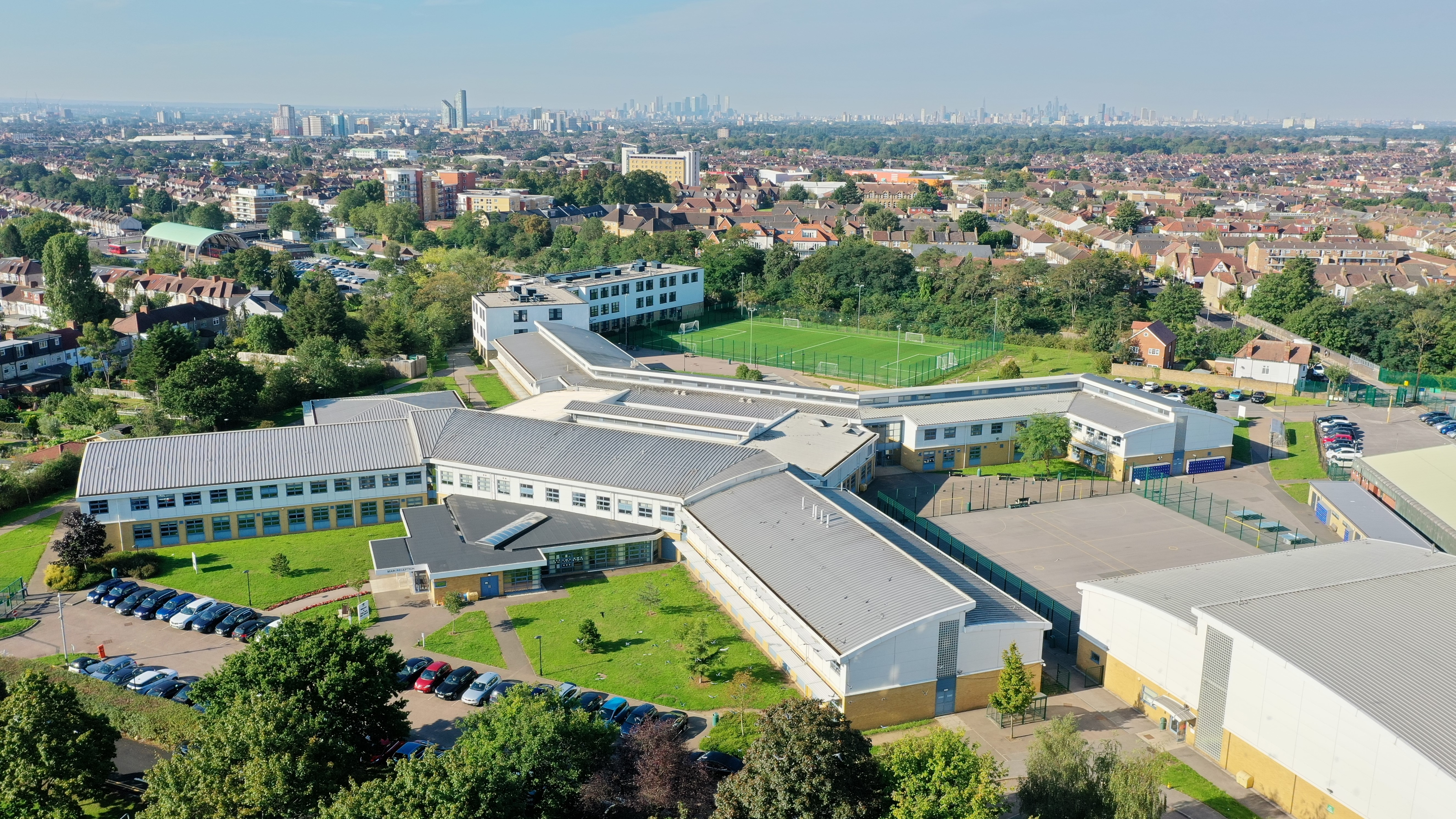
- Oaks Park High School

Location
- 45-65 Oaks Lane; Newbury Park; Ilford, London, IG2 7PQ; England; 51°34′42″N 0°05′29″E

Information
- Type: Comprehensive community school
- Motto: Learning Together, Achieving Together
- Established: 2001
- Local authority: Redbridge
- Department for Education URN: 133405 Tables
- Ofsted: Reports
- Head teacher: Joanne Hamill
- Gender: Co-educational
- Age: 11 to 18
- Enrolment: 1,800
- Houses: Omega, Alpha, Kappa, Sigma
- Colours: Green and yellow
- Website: www.oakspark.co.uk

Oaks Park High School is a comprehensive community school situated in Newbury Park, Ilford, a suburb of London, England, in the United Kingdom. Opened in September 2001, Oaks Park has over 1,850 students, with over 350 in the Sixth Form.

== History ==
Oaks Park High School was built under the private finance initiative to alleviate the growing shortfall of places in schools within the Borough. The school opened on 7 September 2001 with an initial intake of 180 students. In May/June 2006 the school saw the first cohort of students take their GCSE examinations. The Sixth Form opened in September 2006 and Oaks Park became a Specialist Music School at the same time. Oaks Park is now one of the largest schools in Redbridge. There are approximately 1,500 students in the main school and 400 in the sixth form. In January 2016, the £13 million Craig Foster building was opened, hosting facilities for science, drama, and media studies, and creating new spaces for sixth form students.

== Sixth Form ==
The Sixth Form is growing in size and reputation. It retains many students and attracts still more from Redbridge and neighbouring boroughs.

== Achievements ==
In recent years the school has won a number of awards reflecting the wide range of initiatives undertaken by students and staff. Most recently the Travel Green Team achieved a Gold Travel Award for Sustainable Travel, which was awarded by Transport for London. In October 2019 the school was awarded ‘Good’ status by Ofsted. Oaks Park has been designated an International School since 2011. These include students and staff visiting schools overseas, schools from abroad visiting Oaks Park, and video conferences taking place with schools from a variety of countries.

== Notable alumni ==
- Kortney Hause, professional footballer who most recently for Aston Villa
- Jamie Porter, cricketer who plays for Essex County Cricket Club
