= Seven Kings School =

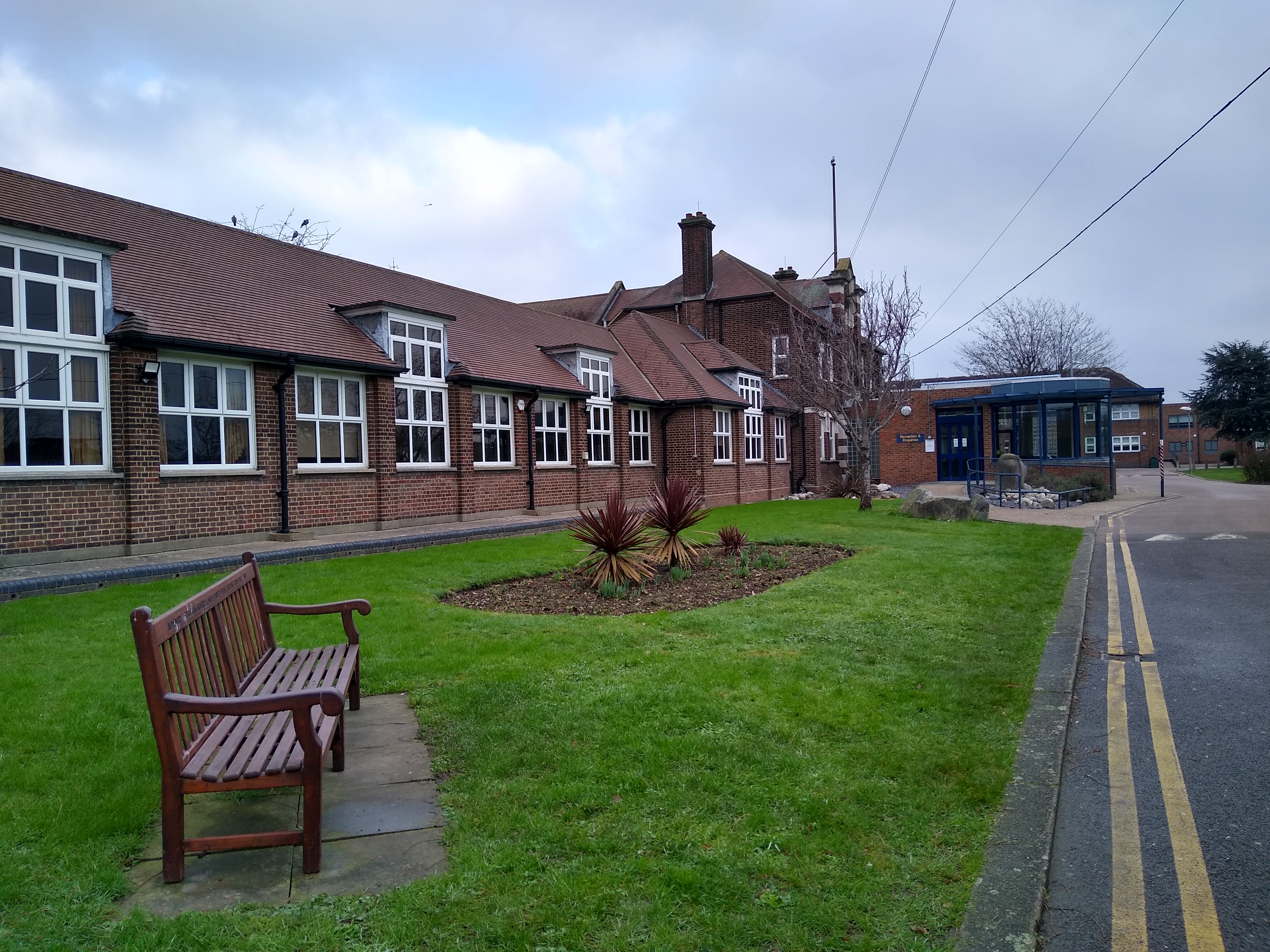

Location
- Ley Street; Ilford, Greater London, IG2 7BT; England; 51°34′07″N 0°05′09″E

Information
- Type: Community School
- Motto: Friendship, Excellence, Opportunity
- Established: 1931
- Local authority: Redbridge
- Department for Education URN: 102856 Tables
- Ofsted: Reports
- Executive headteacher: J. Waters
- Gender: Coeducational
- Age: 4 to 18
- Enrolment: 1,981
- Colours: Blue, Yellow
- Website: http://www.sevenkings.school/

Seven Kings School, previously Seven Kings High School, is a co-educational comprehensive primary and secondary school located in Ilford in the London Borough of Redbridge, England. It caters for pupils aged 4–18 years old. Seven Kings School has separate primary and secondary classroom blocks located within a short walking distance from each other. The school participates in, and has won awards from, notable UK schemes including those such as the Jack Petchey Award. It is a National Teaching School. Seven Kings has been a pioneer in its inclusion policies which integrate pupils with special needs and disabilities.

== History ==
The school was first opened in 1931, as Beal Grammar School, a co-educational grammar school. In 1957, the boys' wing of the school moved to a separate site, and today exists as a co-educational comprehensive secondary school under the name Beal High School. The remaining school became Beal Grammar School for Girls, a selective grammar school for girls. In 1974, the school was renamed Seven Kings High School, merged with Downshall Secondary School, and became a co-educational comprehensive secondary school.

In 2015, Seven Kings Primary School, a four-form entry school, with 120 Reception children was opened. Owing to legislative restrictions on the opening of new primary schools, Seven Kings' new primary school was formed as part of an existing school. Thus, Seven Kings High School along with the new primary school became Seven Kings School. As children from the primary school progress through the school, an additional 120 children will start each year. The primary school reached full capacity in September 2021, when the original Reception intake became Year 6, the final year of primary education. These first children will be the founding year groups of the school and see the school grow as they move up through it. All children who attend Seven Kings Primary will automatically be entitled to move on to Seven Kings High School.

== Uniform ==
Seven Kings uniform for the lower and upper school consists of a navy blue jersey or blazer with school badge, light blue shirt, charcoal grey trousers for boys, navy blue trousers or skirt for girls and a school tie, consisting of the Seven Kings logo of crowns. Pupils are required to meet standards of personal grooming that exclude fashions and other expressions of difference.

The Sixth Form students must wear formal suits (blazers) and ties. From September 2012, male students entering the sixth form must wear black suits and the Seven Kings sixth form tie. Female students are required to wear smart or formal clothes in a similarly limited palate of colours.

== Results ==
A 2007, the school was inspected by Ofsted, who rated it as 'outstanding'. In 2009 Ofsted highlighted Seven Kings High School as one of 12 outstanding schools serving disadvantaged communities.

== Notable former staff ==
Peter Hyman, former speechwriter to ex-Prime Minister Tony Blair, as well as former Head of Communications at 10 Downing Street, taught Politics and History at the school during the 2006–2007 academic school year.

Margaret Blacklock Evans, the headteacher of the school during its transition from Beal Grammar School for Girls to Seven Kings High School, was appointed an OBE in 1985.

Sir Alan Steer, a former headteacher, was the Labour Government's education tsar, completing a report of behavioural policies in educational establishments. This is often referred to as 'the Steer report'. He was knighted in the 2004 Birthday Honours.

== Notable former pupils ==
- George Parris, football player for West Ham from 1982 to 1993
- Rahima Begum (born 1984), human rights activist
