= Epping Forest Keepers =

Maintainers of forest park in/near London

The Epping Forest Keepers are an ancient and historic body of people who are employed by the City of London, who in return are responsible, on behalf of the Conservators, for the management and care of Epping Forest, which covers approximately ten square miles of forest, bridleway, woodland and recreational space stretching from Forest Gate in Greater London, north to North Weald in Essex. The forest is managed by the City of London Corporation and is one of many open spaces that comes under their control that is outside the City of London (Note: The City of London Corporation also manage: Burnham Beeches, City Common, Hampstead Heath, Highgate Wood, Queens Park and West Ham Park) that are maintained by the Corporation of London at no expense to the taxpayer.

== Role ==
As of May 2013, there are nine Forest Keepers, three Senior Forest Keepers and one Head Keeper, each of whom is sworn in as a constable.

In addition, the Superintendent of Epping Forest was attested as a constable in 2014. The reason for the attestation related to both his involvement in incidents in the forest when going about his duties and to strengthen his role as a 'decision maker' in the instigation of proceedings for offences committed under the Epping Forest Act.

The powers of these roles relate exclusively to the enforcement of the Epping Forest Act 1878 and the byelaws made there under. Not all byelaws that are in operation within Epping Forest are made under that Act and the constables have no specific police power in order to enforce them. The constables also have no powers over and above those of a normal person to enforce criminal law, other than 'public justice offences' in relation to them exercising their police powers to enforce the Epping Forest Act (such as obstructing a constable, assaulting a constable or wasting police time in relation to making any false allegations of offences committed under the Epping Forest Act). Where this article may also refer to an "Epping Forest Constable" in places, it should be inferred that it refers to those Forest Keepers that have been attested as a constable.

The current number of Forest Keepers is much lower than is historically listed, as there have been as many as twenty one forest keepers in the past. However, the level of acquired knowledge of Forest Keepers means that they are acutely attuned to everyday activities in the forest. Generally the forest keepers act as forest rangers and very rarely use their powers as a constable.

Under the terms of the Epping Forest Act 1878, the purpose of the Forest is to provide an open space for the recreation and enjoyment of the public and this is to be achieved by conserving the Forest in all its vegetative forms and doing it in such a way that the Forest feels to the visitor to be a natural place. The role of the Epping Forest Keeper is to ensure that this is achieved.

Epping Forest is a site of Site of Special Scientific Interest, which is a conservation designation that denotes it as a protected area. The protection of the forest's fauna, flora, geological or physiographical / geomorphological features is a common theme for the activity of a Forest Keeper.

On an operational basis, common duties may include the following areas of focus:

- Policing vehicular, cycling and equine activity within the forest. The Forest has a number of bridleways, whereby horse users are required to purchase and display a licence. Whilst most horse riders who fail to display a licence are warned, there are examples of multiple violators being prosecuted. Horse riders have expressed concerns regarding some types of behaviour that impedes their sense of safety and enjoyment, such as the illegal use of motorbikes within the forest, dangerous dogs, the use of fireworks and "drinking parties". Whilst most of the forest is open to horse riders and cyclists, there are areas that are clearly sign posted as being off-limits and damage is continuing to be caused to them by unlawful cycling and riding by a minority of individuals.
- Illegal mushroom picking. Press reports suggest that this is an increasing concern within the Forest, which has possibly been influenced by an increased national interest in high quality culinary pursuits. Mushroom pickers often have to pick mushrooms or cause damage to those in situ in order to establish whether they are edible or not, which causes significant damage to the Forest. The later part of 2013 yielded a bumper crop and Forest Keepers could be confronted by large crowds at certain sites, who were causing large scale damage to the forest.
- Fly tipping. Fly tipping has increased over recent years within the Forest and there is some suggestion that this could be linked to the decreased provision of municipal refuse sites within local areas. During the year 2013/2014 there were 666 recorded incidents of fly-tipping, which cost £212,213.58; to put that into context, Epping Forest was 'overspent' on its £4.255m budget by £398,000.
- Protection of deer. Section 4 of the Epping Forest Act 1878 made all deer within the forest the property of the Conservators and placed a duty on them to preserve them. Due to a declining population of deer as a result on an increased number of motor cars that emerged in the 1950s and possibly due to increased hunting activity during the war and post-war period, a deer sanctuary was established in 1959 in Theydon Bois. The sanctuary houses a population of around 100 - 140 deer within 120 acres of land. Wild deer still roam the forest and it is the responsibility of two Epping Forest Keepers to attend road traffic accidents to deal the animal accordingly, whereby at least 40 animals have been killed in road traffic accidents annually over the last few years. The Keepers attended 63 crashes in 2009, which represented a three-fold increase since 2006. It could be suggested that an increased level of car accidents involving deer reflects an increased population of wild deer within the forest. The Deer Management Strategy included the target to reduce the deer population from an estimated 513 in 1996 to 200 in 2002. In 2012 there were an estimated 328, although this could be an underestimate. In deer-rich areas of the Forest, mostly in the north, the role of the Forest Keeper includes culling in the Deer Sanctuary as well as overseeing and participating in the work of licensed deer stalkers, who cull wild deer on the buffer lands as well as within some areas of the forest, which is an important role considering the risk implications for forest users.
- Protecting the forest from encroachment. This role may have featured more prominently during the early years of when Forest Keepers took office, whereby people extended their boundaries onto forest land. Whilst this may be more of a rarity in the 21st century, policing the boundaries of the forest is still a feature of the role. Forest Keepers have the power to remove such encroachments under the Epping Forest Act. Forest Keepers also have the power to remove any unauthorised structure, or any vehicle that people sleep in, such as a caravan. As such, travellers very rarely take up in residence in Epping Forest as they are removed swiftly without the need of going through the Courts. There is an increasing trend of homeless people living in the Forest near Wanstead Flats, which is located within the London Borough of Redbridge. It was reported that Forest Keepers evicted 46 rough sleepers during the summer of 2013

Following the Mounted Section being disbanded in 2009, a new operational model was introduced with a focus on Forest Keepers undertaking high visibility foot and mountain bike patrols. The Keepers are split into sections covering either the north, south or central areas of the forest, which cover the 38 components that the forest has been divided into. The new model placed a greater emphasis on Forest Keepers undertaking a highly visible "ambassadorial" role, rather than one that is just reactive and focuses on monitoring and enforcement. This seems to have had mixed results, with varying workloads and differing work environments not being reflected in the resources deployed by the Conservators.

Despite being attested constables, the Forest Keepers do not carry batons or handcuffs. The Epping Forest and Commons Committee were informed that a Forest Keeper was threatened with a knife by a rough sleeper on 15/01/2014 and two Forest Keepers were assaulted during another arrest. Two other Keepers were threatened at or near their place of residence in 2012. Regardless, the Committee concluded that the wearing of personal protective equipment would make them look confrontational and is increasingly counter to the direction the service is going.

Forest Keepers are increasingly more often found leading volunteer tasks and chairing local community initiatives rather than telling people off. In a return to a more traditional role, some Keepers now also actively participate in practical works, mirroring the older model of Keeper/Woodsman, which was discarded in the last 30 to 40 years to focus on a more enforcement focus. This duality of purpose has led to tensions both within the service and with management.

=== Recorded statistics on activity ===
The Keepers pursue an approach of advising and educating forest users in relation to by law infringements. Whilst there isn't comprehensive information available on their enforcement activity, some information is available below that has been abstracted from various reports that gives some indication of mix of outcomes from their interventions with the public:

Period	Advisory notices issued	Number of prosecutions	Offence categories
1 March 2012 – 31 August 2012	3045	2	Horse riding
21 September 2012 – 28 February 2013	3012	2	Climbing / damaging a tree, Fly Tipping

It could be calculated that there are around an average of 17 'advisory conversations' recorded each day within Epping Forest. Between 2007 and February 2013 there were an average of 8.6 prosecutions per year. However, recent press reports suggest an increased number of people are being prosecuted for mushroom picking and 15 people were due to attend court in January 2014. As a result of the prosecutions, 12 people were fined a total of £2,575.

== Responsibilities for policing ==
Epping Forest is not a separate police area. The statutory responsibility for policing the forest rests either with the Metropolitan Police for parts of the forest within the Metropolitan Police District or Essex Police for the remainder of the forest located in the Essex Police area.

Section 45(1) of the Epping Forest Act clarifies that Epping Forest is a "place of public resort" (presumably to mean a "public place") and that the powers and duties of the Metropolitan Police and Essex Police extend therein (presumably to clarify that they have a duty to police it). This contrasts with the status of a council owned park which, whilst considered a public place when open, is in fact private property and the police would only have a responsibility to respond to incidents, rather than to patrol.

Section 45(3) of the Epping Forest Act places a duty on the Conservators of Epping Forest to pay, out of the Epping Forest Fund, the Metropolitan Police and Essex Police for "the services of constables" within the forest. There is nothing to suggest that either force currently receives payment for policing services within the forest.

== Power to appoint constables/designate officers with police powers ==
The power to swear in constables is derived from the Epping Forest Act 1878. This gives the Conservators of the forest the power to swear in reeves, assistant reeves, bailiffs or other officers appointed by them for 'securing the better execution' of the Act and their bylaws. Epping Forest keepers are sworn as constables under section 43 of the Act, giving them the powers and privileges of a constable in relation to enforcing by-laws and the Epping Forest Act. The Act does not specify a geographical limit within which they can exercise those powers, suggesting that they can do so off of forest land if the matter is in relation to their jurisdiction. They are sworn in before a justice of the peace for Essex. Not all Forest Keepers are attested as constables. Whilst it has been erroneously suggested that the keepers are sworn in as special constables, section 43 of the Act is quite clear that they are attested as constables.

The City of London Corporation may designate any member of staff with the full powers and privileges of a police constable under Section 16, Corporation of London Open Spaces Act 1878, to be exercised within open spaces under their control; however, Section 22 of the Act specifically states that the Act does not relate to Epping Forest. In comparison, the City of London Corporation have granted Hampstead Heath Constabulary Officers this power, although it would not apply in Epping Forest. Hampstead Heath Constables are also attested under the Ministry of Housing and Local Government Provisional Order Confirmation (Greater London Parks and Open Spaces) Act 1967, which is legislation that is specific to London. The City of London are not recognised as a local authority under the 1967 Act. However, the power to attest officers is enabled by Section 5(1) of the London Government Reorganisation (Hampstead Heath) Order 1989, which allows the City of London to exercise the same functions that the former Greater London Council had in relation to Hampstead Heath. Therefore, the 1967 Act only recognises the City of London Corporation as a relevant authority in relation to Hampstead Heath. This creates a legal anomaly in that the constabulary powers afforded by their attestation only relate to Hampstead Heath and cannot be exercised in any other park or open space under the control of the City of London. Therefore, a Hampstead Heath Constable would have no police powers in Epping Forest as neither of the two piece of legislation that enable their constabulary powers relate to Epping Forest.

Forest Keepers deal with byelaw offences made under Section 46 of the Epping Forest Act 1878, and under Section 9 - Regulation of Horse Riding - of the City of London (Various Powers) Act 1971, Section 4 of the City of London (Various Powers) Act 1971 - restriction of rights of common, Section 9 City of London (Various Powers) Act 1990 - riding of horses, Section 10 - new byelaws, also under Section 87 - leaving litter - and Section 88 - fixed penalty notices - of the Environmental Protection Act 1990. However, an anomaly exists that they only have the powers of a constable to enforce the specific byelaws made under Section 46 of the Epping Forest Act 1878.

The Deer Sanctuary in Theydon Bois is not actually located within Epping Forest and is technically located adjacent to it. As such, Epping Forest Keepers have no constabulary powers there. However, the City exercises its powers in relation to the Deer Sanctuary under the City of London (Various Powers) Act 1959 and may make byelaws accordingly.

== Power of an Epping Forest Constable to detain, search and arrest ==
Modern day police powers, and indeed the office of constable itself, have evolved considerably since the first Epping Forest Constables were attested in 1878; however, the legislation that facilitates their office remains unchanged and has survived significant police reform, including the mass mergers and consolidations of constabularies and police organisations into modern day police forces facilitated through the Police Act 1964. Nonetheless, modern day police powers were not necessarily developed to specifically cater for constables that only have police powers for specific purposes, rather than for constables that enjoy full police powers within their jurisdiction. The powers of arrest afforded to Epping Forest Constables from the Epping Forest Act remain unchanged. Nonetheless, enabling legislation in the form of the Police and Criminal Evidence Act 1984, its subsequent amendments and other pieces of legislation provide additional powers for Epping Forest Constables to enforce the Epping Forest Act and its byelaws. As such, the powers that exist for Epping Forest Constables are a unique menu of powers that reflect their historical niche. The sections below offer some commentary on how modern day police powers may facilitate the execution of this historic office.

To clarify, Epping Forest Constables very rarely use their police powers and the fact that they are a constable is generally sufficient when they have an interaction with the public where they require the name and address of an individual. Prosecutions are rare and arrests are now almost non-existent.

=== Epping Forest Act 1871 ===
If a constable sees or finds a person committing an offence against the byelaws, or if they have reasonable suspicion to believe that a person has committed an offence against the byelaws, they may stop and detain them, and if their name and address are unknown, they may 'stop and apprehend' them instead (presumably meaning arrest). They also have the power to stop, detain and examine vehicles or things to which the offence, or suspected offence, relates. However, there is no power to search individuals under the Act.

The Act makes a distinction between the power to detain suspected offenders and the power to apprehend (arrest) them. This power also applies to any constable, which could be considered unique in policing as the police have very few powers to detain (as opposed to arrest) individuals. In the book'A Keeper's Tale' reference is made to taking those suspected of byelaw offences to the police station in order to verify their identities, which presumedly amounts to detention under the Epping Forest Act.

=== Power to stop and search ===
Epping Forest Constables do not routinely exercise such powers and there is nothing to suggest that it is within the scope of their current role to do so. Whilst the Epping Forest Act does not give a specific power to stop and search individuals, it does provide the power to 'examine' (presumably to mean to 'search') vehicles in relation to suspected byelaw offences. As Keepers are neither trained nor equipped to detain individuals, they simply do not exercise that power. The same applies to stop and search.

Nonetheless they do theoretically have some stop and search powers if they are used in relation to byelaws made under the Epping Forest Act:

Purpose of search	Legislation	Byelaw offence
Stolen Items	S.1 Police and Criminal Evidence Act 1984	4- Taking Anything From the Forest
Offensive Weapon	S.1 Police and Criminal Evidence Act 1984	17(a)- Carrying An Offensive Weapon
Gaming or Poaching Equipment	S.2 Poaching Prevention Act 1862	16- Going equipped to hunt
Firearms	S.47 Firearms Act 1968	17(a)- Carrying a Firearm

Stolen goods

The byelaws make it an offence in certain circumstances to take anything from the forest and, as such, it could be held that such items are considered to be "stolen goods" according to the definition outlined in Section 24 of the Theft Act 1968; even though the act of taking them may not necessarily be considered "theft" in accordance with the offence outlined within Section 1 of the Act. The Theft Act 1968 specifically acknowledges in Section 34.2 (b) that an item "severed from the land by stealing" can be considered stolen goods. As such, Epping Forest Constables would theoretically have a power to search an individual for stolen items, if they suspected the person to be in possession of anything taken from the Forest in contravention of by-laws, as such items could be considered to be "stolen". This power would apply whether the individual took the item or was merely in possession of it, regardless of whether they knew that such items were stolen or not. The Police and Criminal Evidence Act (PACE) Codes of Practice Code A (paragraph 2.7) allows for a search to be undertaken for stolen goods even if a power of arrest may not be present, thereby allowing an Epping Forest Constable to search in order to investigate by law infringements. This could include, for example, those suspected of picking mushrooms. This may also apply to anyone suspected of removing a dead deer (whether acquired through hunting or found dead, perhaps through a road accident), as all deer belong to the Conservators. The use of such power would require careful consideration as to whether such items may be deemed to be "stolen goods", although the threshold for the search only requires the level of suspicion.

Offensive weapons

It is an offence to carry a weapon of offence in the forest and the power of search under S.1 PACE applies. The word "carry" could be interpreted as being narrower in scope than the word "possess", which is worthy of note. Someone could be technically in possession of an offensive weapon, although they may not actually be carrying it; such as, if it was in the boot of their car, rather than on their person.

S.1 PACE uses the term 'offensive weapons' as the object for the search and does not restrict the search to seeking evidence of an offense contrary to S.1 of the Prevention of Crime Act 1953; therefore, the power of search relates to any offence that prohibits possessing offensive weapons, which would include byelaws.

Poaching equipment

The Prevention of Poaching Act 1868 creates a power of search for poaching equipment in certain circumstances that can be exercised by a constable or "peace officer". Whilst an Epping Forest Constable would not have constabulary powers under this Act, any Keeper, Reeve or Bailiff appointed under the Epping Forest Act 1878 holds a statutory position that could considered to be a "peace officer". This is further reinforced by their role in enforcing byelaws that create offences relating to going equipped to engage in poaching-like behaviour.

Firearms

As it is an offence to carry a firearm in the forest, the power of search under the Firearms Act 1968 would apply to an Epping Forest Constable. The power of search is not restricted to seeking evidence of offences under the Firearms Act itself and as carrying a firearm is a specific offence under the byelaws, the power of search would apply as an enabling power in support of enforcing the byelaws.

=== Power to arrest ===
The Police and Criminal Evidence Act 1984 provides a constable with a power of arrest for any offence, providing that the relevant criteria are satisfied. The powers under Section 24 would apply to an Epping Forest Constable which could, for example, allow them to arrest someone for an offence in order to allow the prompt and effective investigation of the matter, if they believed it to be necessary; this is usually used to justify an arrest where someone is detained for the purposes of an interview. More commonly, arrest powers exercised under this Act may be where the Epping Forest Constable doubts the person's name and / or address.

=== Power to search upon arrest ===
An Epping Forest Constable would have the power to search anyone that they have arrested using their constabulary powers, if they suspect that the person is in possession of evidence relating to an offence or they are in possession of an item that might be used to escape lawful custody utilising their powers under Section 32 of the Police and Criminal Evidence Act 1984. An Epping Forest Constable could find themselves in a position where they discover evidence of an offence to which they have no power of arrest, such as illegal drugs.

== Offences under the Epping Forest Act 1878 ==
Any offence committed contrary to the Epping Forest Act 1878, or the byelaws contained therein, would attract a maximum penalty of £200.

=== Assault, resist or obstruct ===
Assaulting or resisting a constable, reeve, assistant reeve, bailiff or keeper is an offence under Section 44 of the Epping Forest Act 1878. This would relate to someone causing an obstruction or assault in relation to them carrying out their wide range of duties under the Act.

The offences of assaulting or obstructing a constable under the Police Act 1996 would apply to an Epping Forest Constable if they are acting in their capacity as a constable at that moment in time.

=== Byelaws ===
The byelaws cover a range of different offences in relation to offences against the forest, including objects, animals, flora and fauna therein. The byelaws include the offences of "nuisance behaviour" and "engaging in disorderly conduct", which would cover a wide range of scenarios in terms of addressing antisocial behaviour or public order. Within that context, there are not many situations where the powers of an Epping Forest Constable would be insufficient to enable them to make an arrest if they were in a situation where someone was committing a criminal offence, if it was necessary to pursue such a course of action. For example, offences such as drunk and disorderly, offences under the Public Order Act 1986, some offences committed within the forest under the Sexual Offences Act 2003, many forms of assault and the public consumption of drugs would probably contravene these byelaws. In such scenarios, an Epping Forest Constable could theoretically arrest the person using their police powers in relation to byelaws and the local police could be called to deal with the substantive criminal matter.

=== Prosecution of offences ===
Authorised Epping Forest Keepers prosecute cases within a Magistrates Court, whereby they have the right of audience to present and prosecute a case under Section 223 of the Local Government Act 1972. Keepers often have to complete their 6-month probationary period before receiving authorisation, which is granted by the Epping Forest and Commons Committee through powers delegated to them by the Court of Common Council.

Epping Forest Constables would have a power of arrest to arrest someone that failed to appear for cases in which they are the prosecuting authority if they requested to be named on the warrant. However, it may be impractical for them to do so.

== Discipline and oversight ==
The Forest Keepers sit within accountability arrangements that ultimately feed into the Court of Common Council of the City of London Corporation. The responsibility for the Forest is vested in the Epping Forest and Commons Committee comprising twelve City members and four Verderers. The Verderers are elected every seven years by the Forest’s Commoners. The policies and directives of the Committee are carried out by the Superintendent of Epping Forest. The Epping Forest Committee is a statutory committee that is constituted under Section 31 of the Epping Forest Act 1878.

The City of London Corporation chose not to enter into a voluntary arrangement with the Independent Police Complaints Commission in accordance with Section 26 of the Police Reform Act 2002 so the IPCC has no jurisdiction over the Constables. However, advice is sought from the City of London Police Professional Standards Department in relation to disciplinary issues. Nonetheless, any criminal allegations made against Forest Keepers would be the responsibility of the either the Metropolitan Police or Essex Police to investigate.

The Forest Keepers are paid for out of charitable and private funds held by the City of London Corporation and, as such, their activity is not subject to the Freedom of Information Act. This contrasts with the status of most other constables appointed to serve within private constabularies, such as Port Police, who are subject to the provisions of the Freedom of Information Act. Nonetheless, requests for information can still be submitted, although there is no statutory obligation for the City of London Corporation to respond to them.

=== Criticisms ===
An Epping Forest Keeper took the City of London Corporation to an industrial tribunal after he was dismissed following raising concerns regarding racist material being shown to him. The Keeper alleged that he was victimised as a result of raising concerns and that the act of showing him the material amounted to harassment. The Corporation of London denied this. However, they accepted that he was shown racist material and that the material contained racist words. The Metropolitan Police dropped the investigation as they had been assured that the matter was being dealt with internally.

The Epping Forest Keepers are paid for from private funds. In December 2012, following criticism that it was insufficiently transparent about its finances, the City of London Corporation revealed that its "City's Cash" account – an endowment fund built up over the past 800 years that it says is used "for the benefit of London as a whole" – holds more than £1.3bn. The fund collects money made from the corporation’s property and investment earnings.

The Forest Keepers are paid for by private funds and the Corporation of London is acting in a private capacity (i.e. not as a local authority) to manage Epping Forest. The Keepers are not subject to the framework associated with the IPCC and are not subject to FOI. This arrangement for an attested constable is unique within the United Kingdom.

== Appointment of Reeves ==
The Epping Forest Act enshrines the right of certain forest parishes to nominate persons to be appointed as Reeves and Assistant Reeves, subject to the approval of the Conservators. The office of Reeve has its origins in Anglo-Saxon times and Shire Reeves often had a role in the prevention and detection of crimes. The word "sheriff" has its origin in and is a contraction of the words "Shire Reeve".

Once appointed, Reeves would be Officers of the Conservators, which is the same status enjoyed by Forest Keepers. As such, they would be empowered to enforce the Act under the direction of the Conservators and the provision remains to have them attested as a constable. The tradition of elected Reeves within the forest predated the Act itself and the Reeves were historically concerned with estate management, including the branding of cattle. The office of Reeve remains, although it could be considered to be an honorary or ceremonial role.

== Appointment of Bailiffs ==
The Epping Forest Act 1878 contains the provision to appoint Bailiffs and to attest them as constables, although no Bailiffs are currently attested.

Epping Forest currently recruits uniformed Volunteer Fishing Bailiffs, who patrol ponds to engage with the public on angling issues and report any issues that arise to Forest Keepers.

== History and notable events ==
The Epping Forest Archive Project catalogued a vast collection of long-forgotten City of London Corporation documents salvaged from the dusty attic of Warren House in Loughton - where forest superintendents were based until 2001 - and moved to a new home in the London Metropolitan Archives. The material provides a historical insight into some of the concerns raised regarding the forest including "rogue donkey drivers", "disgusting behaviour of men that was frightening ladies" and issues regarding "scruffy Forest Keepers". The material can be viewed online and includes reports made by Forest Keepers, photographs and other material about the forest.

=== Historic forest policing ===
Before 1878 Epping Forest was previously the Royal Forest of Waltham, which emerged as a distinct component of the larger Forest of Essex. Forest Courts were historically convened to hear offences against the forest, which were sometimes held in Stratford. In 1617 the King granted to the Lord Warren of the forest the right to build and maintain a prison at Stratford, which remained in use intermittently. The last record of the building standing is 1827 and the site now houses St John's Church, where construction started in 1832.

=== 1891- Communist disorder on Wanstead Flats ===
Wanstead Flats attracted many people from the East End of London during the late 1800s, who valued the open space, as it is only a few miles away from the inner cities by foot and within easy reach of Forest Gate Station.

The East End was an eclectic mix of skilled and unskilled people that often lived in densely populated areas and who often worked in jobs with low wages and poor conditions. The area was attracting an increased number of Jewish immigrants escaping increased hostilities in Europe, many of whom found work in the textile industries and faced poor working conditions. The population of what is now known as the London Borough of Tower Hamlets rose from 309,012 in 1841 to 509,012 in 1901. The rest of the "East End", which covers a broader area than the Tower Hamlets footprint, experienced similar levels of exponential population growth. The East End was facing a perfect storm for raised tensions and, as such, it attracted social reformers and elements that sought to encourage support for more radical ideologies.

Attracting large crowds, especially on Wednesday and Sunday afternoons, the Flats provided a place for people to speak publicly and became a focal point for anarchists and communists to meet alongside other people who were enjoying the open space.

It was suggested that authorities became increasingly concerned with the emergence of increasingly extreme political groups and movements within the east end and that action was taken to disrupt their activities. As such, Forest Keepers started to enforce by-laws preventing such public speaking and organised meetings that had previously been tolerated. Whilst trying to appear impartial, Christian groups that also met on the Flats now found themselves being subject to the attention of Forest Keepers and this led to an unusual alliance between Christians and communists, who both felt persecuted.

Following months of action by the Forest Keepers, including prosecutions, tensions came to a head when a "howling mob" (Chelmsford Chronicle, 25 September 1891) marched to the Flats. Forest Keepers and mounted police were deployed and Forest Keepers arrested the ring leaders leading to their imprisonment. Following this, tensions and hostilities started to lessen over the following months.

It still remains an offence under by-law 40 to either engage in public speaking or to preach within Epping Forest without the permission of the Conservators.

== See also ==
- List of law enforcement agencies in the United Kingdom
- Law enforcement in the United Kingdom
