= Verderer =

Officials who administer the local laws of certain forests

Verderers are forestry officials in England who deal with common land in certain former royal hunting areas which are the property of the Crown. The office was developed in the Middle Ages to administer forest law on behalf of the King. Verderers investigated and recorded minor offences such as the taking of venison and the illegal cutting of woodland, and dealt with the day-to-day forest administration. In the modern era, verderers are still to be found in the New Forest, the Forest of Dean, and Epping Forest, where they serve to protect commoning practices, and conserve the traditional landscape and wildlife.

== Origins ==
Verderers were originally part of the ancient judicial and administrative hierarchy of the vast areas of English forests and Royal Forests set aside by William the Conqueror for hunting. The title Verderer comes from the Norman word ‘vert’ meaning green and referring to woodland. These forests were divided into provinces each having a Chief Justice who travelled around on circuit dealing with the more serious offences. Verderers investigated and recorded minor offences and dealt with the day to day forest administration.

== New Forest Verderers ==
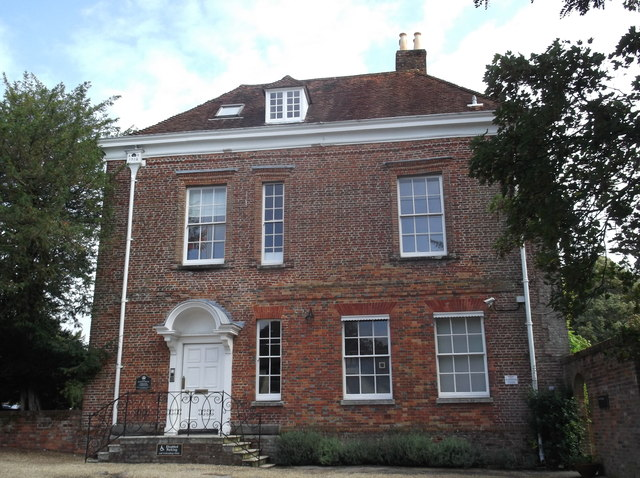
King's House, Lyndhurst, where the Court meets in open session

In the New Forest the Verderers are a group of unpaid individuals whose primary objective is to regulate and protect the interests of the New Forest Commoners, and to preserve the natural beauty and good traditional character of the Forest. Together they constitute the Court of Verderers (or Court of Swainmote). Established sometime prior to the 12th century, the verderers initially represented the interest of the Crown, until the 19th century when they were reconstituted to represent the interests of the Commoners. The Court has the same status as a Magistrates Court, and acting under its authority the Verderers are responsible for regulating commoning within the Forest, for dealing with unlawful inclosures, and for a wide range of other matters relating to development control and conservation such as proposals for new roads, car parks, camping sites, recreational facilities, playing fields and so on.

== Forest of Dean Verderers ==
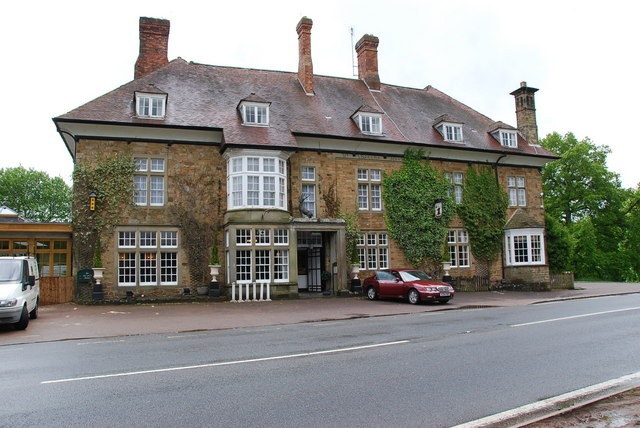
Speech House

The Verderers in the Forest of Dean have been in existence since at least 1218 and are charged with protecting the vert and venison (that is, generally, the vegetation and habitat) of the Forest. The Verderers are elected by the freeholders of Gloucestershire at the Gloucester Court (an ancient procedure in its own right) and serve for life. Over the years, the deer in the Forest of Dean have fluctuated in numbers and species (they were totally absent for about 90 years from 1855) but today a herd of about 400 fallow deer inhabits the Forest. The Verderers now meet quarterly in their courtroom in the Speech House, close to the centre of the Forest.

== Epping Forest Verderers ==
Verderers in the former Royal Forest of Epping (formerly Waltham Forest) have been appointed since the early 13th century, although early records are incomplete. The office was preserved by the Epping Forest Act 1878, which named the foundation verderers of the new regime: Sir Fowell Buxton, 3rd Baronet, Sir Antonio Brady, Thomas Charles Baring, and Andrew Johnston. They are nowadays elected at septennial elections among the registered commoners, two for the northern parishes, two for the southern. The verderers act as representatives of the users of the Forest, meet the Superintendent and other officials regularly, and are members of the Epping Forest Committee of the City of London. A history of the verderers of this Forest was published in 2004.

== See also ==
- Reeve (England)
