= Holy Innocents Church, High Beach =

Church in Essex, England

Holy Innocents Church
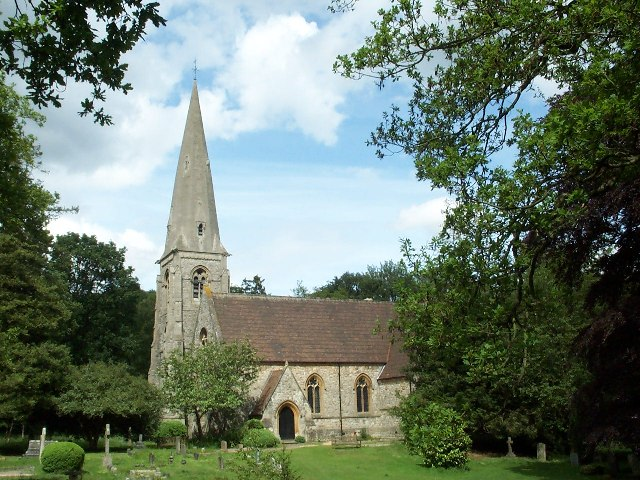
- Holy Innocents Church
- 51.6617°N 0.03444°E
- Denomination: Anglican

History
- Consecrated: 18 August 1883

Architecture
- Architect: Arthur Blomfield
- Architectural type: Gothic Revival
- Years built: 1872–1873
- Construction cost: £5,500

Administration
- Diocese: Chelmsford

The Holy Innocents Church is a Grade II listed Anglican parish church located in the village of High Beach, Essex, England.

Designed in the Gothic Revival style, the church is noted for its picturesque setting.

== History ==
Holy Innocents Church replaced an earlier chapel located around 1 mile (1.6 km) from the current church's location. The church was commissioned by Thomas Charles Baring , who resided at High Beach and was designed by architect Arthur Blomfield. The church was completed in June 1873 and consecrated on 18th August 1883.

The church suffered a bomb blast in 1945, destroying three of the east lancet windows, which were replaced by James Powell and Sons in 1948.

It was designated as a Grade II listed building in 1956, recognising its architectural merit and historical significance to the region.

== Architecture ==
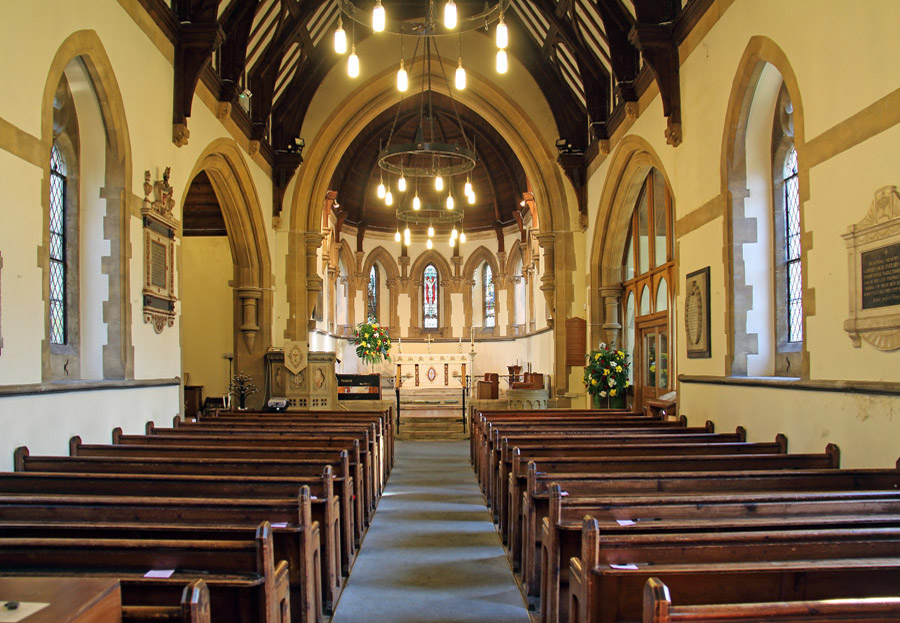
The Holy Innocents nave

=== Exterior ===
Built primarily from rock-faced stone with limestone dressings and a clay tiled roof, the church is built in a cruciform shape. The most prominent feature is its limestone and shingled spire, which rises above the forest canopy and is visible from various points within the Epping Forest ridge. It follows the Gothic Revival style, with many features derived from work from 13th-century England, characterised by pointed arches and lancet windows.

=== Interior ===
The interior walls are plastered and whitened, including an ornate pulpit and choir stalls. The church contains several notable stained glass windows, including works that serve as memorials to the Baring family. A fine pipe organ was installed shortly after the church's completion in 1878 by Henry Willis, which remains a central part of the liturgy.

== In popular culture ==
The church was the primary location for the murder mystery film Wake Up Dead Man, doubling as upstate New York. Filmed in mid-2024, the exterior was shot at the church, and the interior was recreated on a soundstage.
