= Waltham Forest (legal forest) =

Former legal forest in England

Coordinates: 51.640°N 0.065°E

Waltham Forest was a royal forest that existed from around the time the Forest of Essex was disestablished in the 13th century. After that Forest Law was focused on areas with higher concentrations of woodland than the sparsely wooded Forest of Essex ever had.

Forests were legal institutions introduced by the Normans to denote an area where the King or another magnate had the right to keep and hunt deer and make Forest Law. Initially there was a very weak correlation between the extent of the legal forest and what might be termed the 'physical forest', the often wooded Common Land areas where the deer lived. In later centuries there was a much stronger correlation – with Forest areas decreasing in extent to more closely align with wooded area. Eventually the word forest became synonymous with woodland.

The first known use of the name Waltham Forest is 1205 (in Medieval Latin) as foresta nostra prope Waltham, and the use of the name persisted, together with names for various parts of the forest, until the end of the seventeenth century.

Waltham Forest was focused on the heavily wooded areas subsequently known as Epping Forest and Hainault Forest. Outside those areas woodland cover would have been modest, particularly near the Roding and Lea rivers.

Within Epping Forest were other named areas of woodland, sometime coppiced in contrast to the general wood-pasture management, such as Hawkwood, Bury Wood, Great Monk Wood and others.

Waltham Forest was bounded by the River Lea in the west and the originally Roman Romford Road (A118) in the south. It stretched north with boundaries in the Harlow area.

The modern London Borough of Waltham Forest, formed in 1965, was named after this institution.
