= Fred J Speakman =

British naturalist (died 1982)

Fred J Speakman (died 1982) was an English naturalist and author. He was one of Britain's best known naturalist-authors in the 1960s.

== Life ==
Speakman grew up and lived in Epping Forest and became a teacher at Woodside School, Walthamstow. He spent his later years running a field centre at Roserville, High Beach between 1959 and 1979. A well known popular writer of illustrated guides to the English forests, in the mid 1950s with the support of Walthamstow's Education Office he began to convert Jubilee Retreat, Chingford into a classroom able to take 20 pupils for day visits to the forest.

In 1959 he acquired Roserville, High Beach and converted it into a nature study centre. The borough became a pioneer in childhood environmental education, sending primary school children who often lived in working class urban areas on fortnightly visits to be taught by Speakman at Roserville and Ernie Douse and later Ken Hoy at the Jubilee Retreat. As demand for trips to the forest increased, the new London Borough of Waltham Forest purchased the Suntrap Centre in 1967, sending all final year primary classes to make eight visits a year to the centre.

After retiring he went on to live in Barbados with his second wife Kit and died there in 1982.

== Bibliography ==
- Speakman, Fred J. (1954). Tracks, Trails, and Signs. London: G Bell & Sons. p. 154. ISBN 0-7135-0965-1. OCLC 9035097.
- Speakman, Fred J. (1958). The Young Naturalist's Year. p. 176. OCLC 30218864.
- Curtis, A T; Fred J Speakman (1960). A Poacher's Tale. London: G Bell & Sons. p. 200. ISBN 0-7135-0969-4. OCLC 271678045.
- Speakman, Fred J. (1962). A Keeper's Tale. London: G Bell & Sons. p. 163. ISBN 0-85115-224-4. OCLC 60048994.
- Speakman, Fred J. (1965). A Forest By Night. London: G Bell & Sons. p. 193. OCLC 8019187.
- Speakman, Fred J. (1967). Out of the Wild. London: HarperCollins. p. 163. ISBN 978-0-7135-0965-6.
- Speakman, Fred J. (1972). Torty of Woodend. London: G Bell & Sons. p. 94. ISBN 978-0-7135-1731-6. OCLC 16199379.
