= Great Monk Wood =

Woodland in Epping Forest, Essex, England

Coordinates: 51.667°N 0.053°E

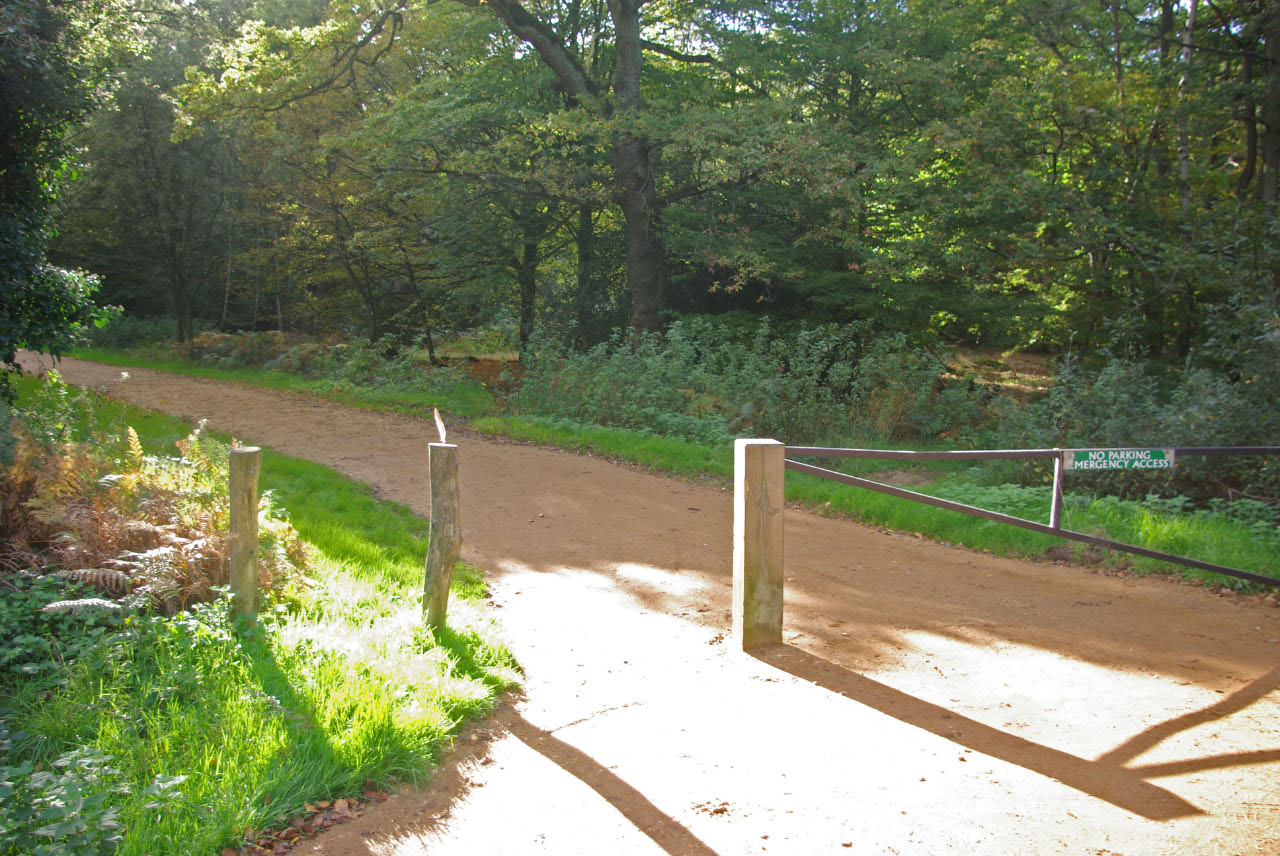
A track through Great Monk Wood

Great Monk Wood is a wood within Epping Forest, in Essex, England.

The wood, in the parish of Loughton, is centred on the Wakes Arms junction roundabout of the A104 Epping New Road, and the A121, and is southwest from the town of Epping and north from Loughton. The London orbital M25 motorway skirts the wood at its north. The nearest significant villages are High Beech, which is southwest within Epping Forest, and Theydon Bois to the east outside the Forest.

Nearby railway or tube stations include Chingford, Buckhurst Hill, Loughton and Theydon Bois.
