= Wake Up Dead Man =

2025 film by Rian Johnson

- Release poster
- Directed by: Rian Johnson
- Written by: Rian Johnson
- Produced by: Ram Bergman; Rian Johnson
- Starring: Daniel Craig; Josh O'Connor; Glenn Close; Josh Brolin; Mila Kunis; Jeremy Renner; Kerry Washington; Andrew Scott; Cailee Spaeny; Daryl McCormack; Thomas Haden Church
- Cinematography: Steve Yedlin
- Edited by: Bob Ducsay
- Music by: Nathan Johnson
- Production company: T-Street
- Distributed by: Netflix
- Release dates: September 6, 2025 (TIFF); November 26, 2025 (United States); December 12, 2025 (Netflix)
- Running time: 144 minutes
- Country: United States
- Language: English
- Budget: $151.7 million
- Box office: $2.5 million

Wake Up Dead Man (marketed as Wake Up Dead Man: A Knives Out Mystery) is a 2025 American mystery film written and directed by Rian Johnson. It is the third film in the Knives Out series. The film stars Daniel Craig, who reprises his role as master detective Benoit Blanc as he investigates the death of a Catholic priest against the backdrop of a missing inheritance. The ensemble cast also includes Josh O'Connor, Glenn Close, Josh Brolin, Mila Kunis, Jeremy Renner, Kerry Washington, Andrew Scott, Cailee Spaeny, Daryl McCormack, and Thomas Haden Church.

The film had its world premiere at the Toronto International Film Festival on September 6, 2025, and was released in select theaters on November 26, 2025, before streaming on Netflix on December 12, 2025. Like its predecessors, it received positive reviews, with particular praise for the performances of Craig, O'Connor, and Close.

== Plot ==
After punching a fellow deacon, former boxer-turned-Catholic priest Jud Duplenticy is reassigned to Our Lady of Perpetual Fortitude, an upstate New York parish led by Monsignor Jefferson Wicks, the grandson of Reverend Prentice Wicks. Duplenticy learns Prentice had amassed a small fortune before dying and that Jefferson's troubled mother Grace had remained at the church in hopes of receiving Prentice's inheritance. When the fortune went missing, she ransacked the church and destroyed its crucifix. Jud disdains Wicks' reign over the parish, as his incendiary preaching has driven away all but his most loyal and corrupt parishioners. During a Good Friday service, Wicks collapses in a closet adjoining the chancel. A knife fashioned from a red devil's-head lamp finial is found in his back, and he is pronounced dead. As Jud had threatened Wicks and drunkenly stolen an identical finial from a bar the day before, he becomes the main suspect in a locked-room mystery.

Police chief Geraldine Scott summons detective Benoit Blanc to investigate. He recruits Jud to assist him, convinced of his innocence. After Wicks' entombment in Prentice's mausoleum, Jud and Blanc question the congregation. They learn that Wicks claimed to have found Prentice's fortune and planned to use it to pursue a career in politics with Cy Draven, his illegitimate son. Cy reveals Wicks intended to close the church after publicly shaming and exposing the secrets of his followers. Tired of Blanc's dogged pursuit of justice, Jud quits the investigation. That night, he apparently witnesses Wicks exiting the mausoleum and embracing groundskeeper Samson. Jud is knocked out while pursuing them and wakes up next to Samson's corpse, believing he killed him.

Blanc stops Jud from turning himself in and takes him to parish member Nat Sharp's house, where they find Nat's corpse dissolving in a tub of acid alongside Wicks' body. The following morning, the police and parishioners convene in the church for Jud's confession, only for Blanc to explain that Nat killed Wicks. An accomplice attached a decoy finial to Wicks' matching red vestment and spiked Wicks' flask with sedatives. As Wicks routinely imbibed during service, he passed out and was found with fake blood on his back, spilled from the finial by remote control. Nat then feigned examining the body and switched out the decoy to fatally stab Wicks. Before Blanc can continue, he appears to have an epiphany and abruptly declares that he cannot explain what happened. The congregation leaves.

Blanc explains he was inspired by Jud's example to allow the killer to come forward. Martha, the church's longtime secretary, returns to confess: she knew Prentice had converted his fortune into a diamond he called "Eve's Apple". When he took his own life by swallowing it, Wicks' mother Grace had ransacked the church in search of it, attacking Martha when she mocked her. Martha had witnessed Prentice's final deed but kept silent until her last confession with Wicks. Upon realizing Wicks' true greed, she conspired with Nat to murder Wicks before he could destroy the church.

After Wicks' death, Martha had Samson entombed in Wicks' place to retrieve and destroy Eve's Apple. After finding it, Samson left the tomb dressed as Wicks, staging a resurrection to preserve Wicks' legacy and the church's reputation. Nat dressed as Samson and waited outside the tomb, but when Jud arrived, Nat killed Samson to keep Eve's Apple for himself. Nat then poisoned Martha's coffee with pentobarbital, only for her to swap their cups unnoticed, killing him. Having taken the pentobarbital to commit suicide, Martha lets Jud absolve her after she asks for forgiveness for her treatment of Grace. As she dies, Martha drops the diamond.

One year later, Jud has carved a new crucifix and is about to reopen the church, now renamed Our Lady of Perpetual Grace. Most of the parishioners have moved on with their lives, though a disgruntled Cy, convinced Jud is hiding Eve's Apple, says he will closely monitor his finances for any traces of it. Blanc bids farewell to Jud. As new parishioners enter for Jud's first Mass, Eve's Apple is seen concealed within the chest of the new crucifix.

== Cast ==
- Daniel Craig as Benoit Blanc, a renowned private detective.
- Josh O'Connor as Father Jud Duplenticy, a young priest and former boxer who reformed after killing a man in a match
- Glenn Close as Martha Delacroix, a devout church lady and Wicks' right-hand woman
- Josh Brolin as Monsignor Jefferson Wicks, a charismatic firebrand priest
- Mila Kunis as Geraldine Scott, a local police chief
- Jeremy Renner as Nat Sharp, a town doctor who struggles with alcoholism after his divorce
- Kerry Washington as Vera Draven, Cy's adoptive mother, a tightly wound lawyer
- Andrew Scott as Lee Ross, a former best-selling author trying to revive his career
- Cailee Spaeny as Simone Vivane, a disabled former concert cellist hoping to be cured by a miracle
- Daryl McCormack as Cy Draven, Vera's adoptive son, an aspiring politician and conservative influencer
- Thomas Haden Church as Samson Holt, a circumspect groundskeeper and Martha's lover
- Jeffrey Wright as Langstrom, a bishop who assigns Duplenticy to Wicks' church
- Annie Hamilton as Grace Wicks, Jefferson's mother, branded the "harlot whore" by Jefferson and the community
- James Faulkner as Prentice Wicks, Jefferson's grandfather and founder of the local church
- Bridget Everett as Louise, a construction company employee
- Noah Segan as Nikolai, a bar owner (Note: Segan, one of Johnson's main collaborators, previously appeared in Knives Out (2019) as Trooper Wagner and Glass Onion (2022) as Derol.)
- Joseph Gordon-Levitt as a baseball announcer (Note: Gordon-Levitt, one of Johnson's main collaborators, previously had voice cameos in Knives Out as Detective Hardrock and in Glass Onion as the Hourly Dong.)

== Production ==
=== Development ===
Prior to the release of Knives Out (2019), Rian Johnson said he would like to create sequels with Benoit Blanc investigating further mysteries, and already had an idea for a new film. On March 31, 2021, it was reported that Netflix bought the rights to two Knives Out sequels for over $400 million. He wanted each film in his Knives Out series to be distinct, and opted to choose a "grounded" setting for his third film to subvert the expectation of the destinations being lavish. Johnson first shared his idea about the film's setting being in a church with Craig after Glass Onion's (2022) screening at the BFI London Film Festival.

=== Writing ===
In June 2022, Johnson revealed Knives Out 3 was a working title with his intent being each film has a distinct title, citing the works of Agatha Christie as his inspiration for the films and the individual titles. In November 2022, Johnson said he was preparing to work on writing the third film. By January 2023, Johnson confirmed he had started writing the script for the third film, stating it will be tonally and thematically different from the previous installments. Johnson later stated though he had approved the subtitle of A Knives Out Mystery for the previous installment, he would like to rename the series and add A Benoit Blanc Mystery as subtitles to future installments. The film's title Wake Up Dead Man comes from a phrase in the folk song "Ain't No More Cane on the Brazos", though Johnson notes that it is also "kind of" derived from the title of the song of the same name by U2.

In October 2023, following the resolution of the 2023 Writers Guild of America strike, Johnson announced he had started working on the script for the third film. The filmmaker stated he had the premise planned, and could begin writing again. He considered the script as "definitely the hardest script I've ever written" and spent over eight months contemplating ideas prior to starting the writing process since he wanted to explore the film's religious themes with nuance "while also not being facile about it, or — God forbid — moralistic or irreverent." Johnson realized that he was writing through the "lens of me, now" and that the film's church attendees are a reflection of his experience growing up in Orange County, California. He felt Spaeny's character as a disabled cellist allowed him to physically express his pain, while Sharp's character symbolized the "notion of bitterness that you're hanging onto," with Draven's political affiliations were based on Johnson's personal change in his political beliefs. Johnson also opted to frame the murder mystery genre as being "gamified" and the "genre itself that we’re inside," which Jud and Blanc were both enamored by. Thus, he included the scene with Louise as a way to divert attention from the murder mystery and serve as a "reset" since he wanted to explore the themes of selflessness, service, and the duties of a priest.

==== Influences ====
Johnson said his key influences were works of Edgar Allan Poe and John Dickson Carr, as well as elements of works of Agatha Christie, especially her novel And Then There Were None (1939). Carr's The Hollow Man (1935) is repeatedly referenced within the film. The flashback scenes depicting Grace Wicks destroying the church were influenced by Francis Ford Coppola's Bram Stoker's Dracula (1992). Johnson also drew from his own religious upbringing in Evangelicalism, with the atheist Blanc reflecting his feelings on organized religion. However, he chose to have the film focus on Catholicism for aesthetic reasons, saying the churches he grew up in "kind of looked like Pottery Barns" and would therefore serve as a poor visual basis for the film.

=== Casting ===
Daniel Craig acknowledged interest in returning to the role early on during the project's development. Craig was paid $100 million for his involvement in the two Knives Out sequels. In May 2024, Josh O'Connor, Cailee Spaeny, Andrew Scott, Kerry Washington, Glenn Close, Jeremy Renner, Mila Kunis, and Daryl McCormack joined the main cast. Renner's likeness had previously been used in Glass Onion, although he had not been featured otherwise. The following month, Josh Brolin and Thomas Haden Church joined the cast.

The end credits of the film feature a series of portraits of the main characters, for which the cast posed in costume for English painter Isabella Watling.

=== Filming ===
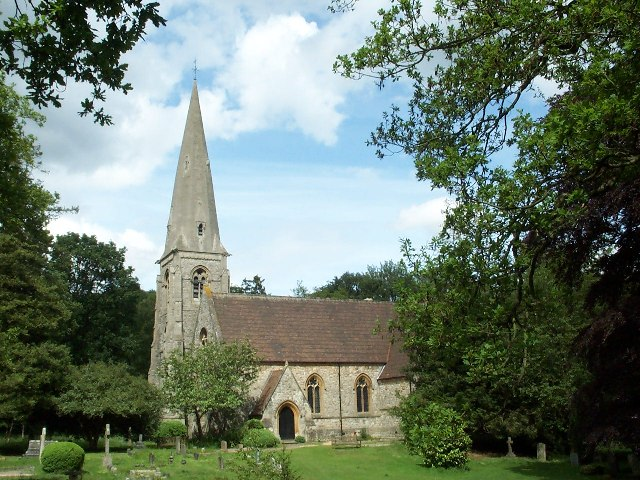
Church of the Holy Innocents

Johnson's regular collaborators Steve Yedlin and Nathan Johnson returned as cinematographer and composer, respectively. Principal photography began on June 10, 2024, in London. First-look photos from the set revealed Craig's character, Benoit Blanc, with a noticeably different, longer hairstyle than in previous films. On June 19, 2024, Close revealed she was "really hit hard" with both COVID-19 and respiratory syncytial virus (RSV), which was also revealed to have resulted in her being able to only participate in two days of filming by that point in time. Filming was completed on August 17.

Church exteriors, set in New York state, were shot in England at the Church of the Holy Innocents, High Beach, Epping Forest. Additional exterior footage was shot in September 2024 in Cold Spring, New York, which served as the setting of Chimney Rock in the film.

== Music ==
The official soundtrack, titled Wake Up Dead Man (Original Motion Picture Soundtrack), scored by Nathan Johnson was released on November 28, 2025.

== Release ==
Wake Up Dead Man: A Knives Out Mystery had its world premiere at the Toronto International Film Festival on September 6, 2025. The film had its international premiere at the BFI London Film Festival on October 8, 2025. It was released in select theaters on November 26, 2025, and on Netflix on December 12.

== Reception ==
=== Critical response ===
On the review aggregator website Rotten Tomatoes, 92% of 344 critics' reviews are positive, with an average rating of 7.9/10. The website's consensus reads: "Giving Benoit Blanc a worthy mystery with its genuinely soulful fixation on faith and a scene-stealing Josh O'Connor performance, Wake Up Dead Man is another Knives Out puzzle that comes together splendidly." Metacritic, which uses a weighted average, assigned the film a score of 80 out of 100, based on 59 critics, indicating "generally favorable" reviews.

Damon Wise for Deadline wrote that the film "may be the best one yet" in the Knives Out franchise due to its more introspective nature. On the German arthouse portal Programmkino.de, Dieter Oßwald wrote, "this sequel also offers everything a Knives-coup needs: perfectly quirky characters, superb tension, witty twists, star power, and a brilliant Daniel Craig with a screen presence that exudes effortless cool." Alissa Wilkinson of The New York Times wrote that what makes the film work is that "Father Jud and Benoit Blanc are two peas in a pod, when it comes right down to brass tacks."

Some reviewers responded to the movie's use of Catholicism with enthusiasm, while others found aspects unbelievable.

=== Accolades ===
Award	Date of ceremony	Category	Nominee(s)	Result	Ref.
AACTA International Awards	February 6, 2026	Best Supporting Actress	Glenn Close	Nominated	
AARP Movies for Grownups Awards	January 10, 2026	Best Ensemble	Cast of Wake Up Dead Man	Nominated	
Astra Film Awards	January 9, 2026	Best Supporting Actor – Comedy or Musical	Josh O'Connor	Nominated	
Astra Film Awards	January 9, 2026	Best Supporting Actress – Comedy or Musical	Glenn Close	Nominated	
Astra Film Awards	January 9, 2026	Best Cast Ensemble	Cast of Wake Up Dead Man	Nominated	
Astra Creative Arts Awards	December 11, 2025	Best Casting	Bret Howe and Mary Vernieu	Nominated	
Astra Creative Arts Awards	December 11, 2025	Best Second Unit Director	Katie Swain	Nominated	
Kansas City Film Critics Circle	December 21, 2025	Best Film	Wake Up Dead Man: A Knives Out Mystery	Nominated	
Kansas City Film Critics Circle	December 21, 2025	Robert Altman Award for Best Director	Rian Johnson	Nominated	
Kansas City Film Critics Circle	December 21, 2025	Best Supporting Actor	Josh O'Connor	Nominated	
Kansas City Film Critics Circle	December 21, 2025	Best Supporting Actress	Glenn Close	Nominated	
Kansas City Film Critics Circle	December 21, 2025	Tom Poe Award for Best LGBTQ Film	Wake Up Dead Man: A Knives Out Mystery	Nominated	
National Board of Review	December 3, 2025	Top Ten Films	Wake Up Dead Man: A Knives Out Mystery	Honored	
New York Film Critics Online	December 15, 2025	Best Supporting Actress	Glenn Close	Nominated	
New York Film Critics Online	December 15, 2025	Best Ensemble Cast	Cast of Wake Up Dead Man	Nominated	
Savannah Film Festival	November 1, 2025	Outstanding Achievement in Directing Award	Rian Johnson	Won	
Saturn Awards	March 8, 2026	Best Thriller Movie	Wake Up Dead Man: A Knives Out Mystery	Nominated	
St. Louis Film Critics Association	December 14, 2025	Best Adapted Screenplay	Rian Johnson	Nominated	
St. Louis Film Critics Association	December 14, 2025	Best Supporting Actress	Glenn Close	Nominated	
Toronto International Film Festival	September 14, 2025	People's Choice Award	Wake Up Dead Man: A Knives Out Mystery	2nd Runner-up	

== Future ==
In September 2022, Johnson confirmed his intention to make more films in the series. Later that month, Craig and Johnson separately said they would continue making further films, as long as they were both involved. In October 2025, Johnson stated that he had nothing planned for a fourth film in the series, though he did express a willingness to make another film as long as he and Craig have fun doing them and audiences enjoy them. He said he finds them challenging to make, especially in terms of developing new plots.

It was announced in November 2025 that Johnson and Craig were "starting to formulate ideas" for a potential fourth Knives Out movie. In January 2026, Johnson said that he had "some basic, elemental, conceptual ideas".
