= High Beach =

Village in Essex, England

Coordinates: 51.662°N 0.032°E

High Beach: High Beech
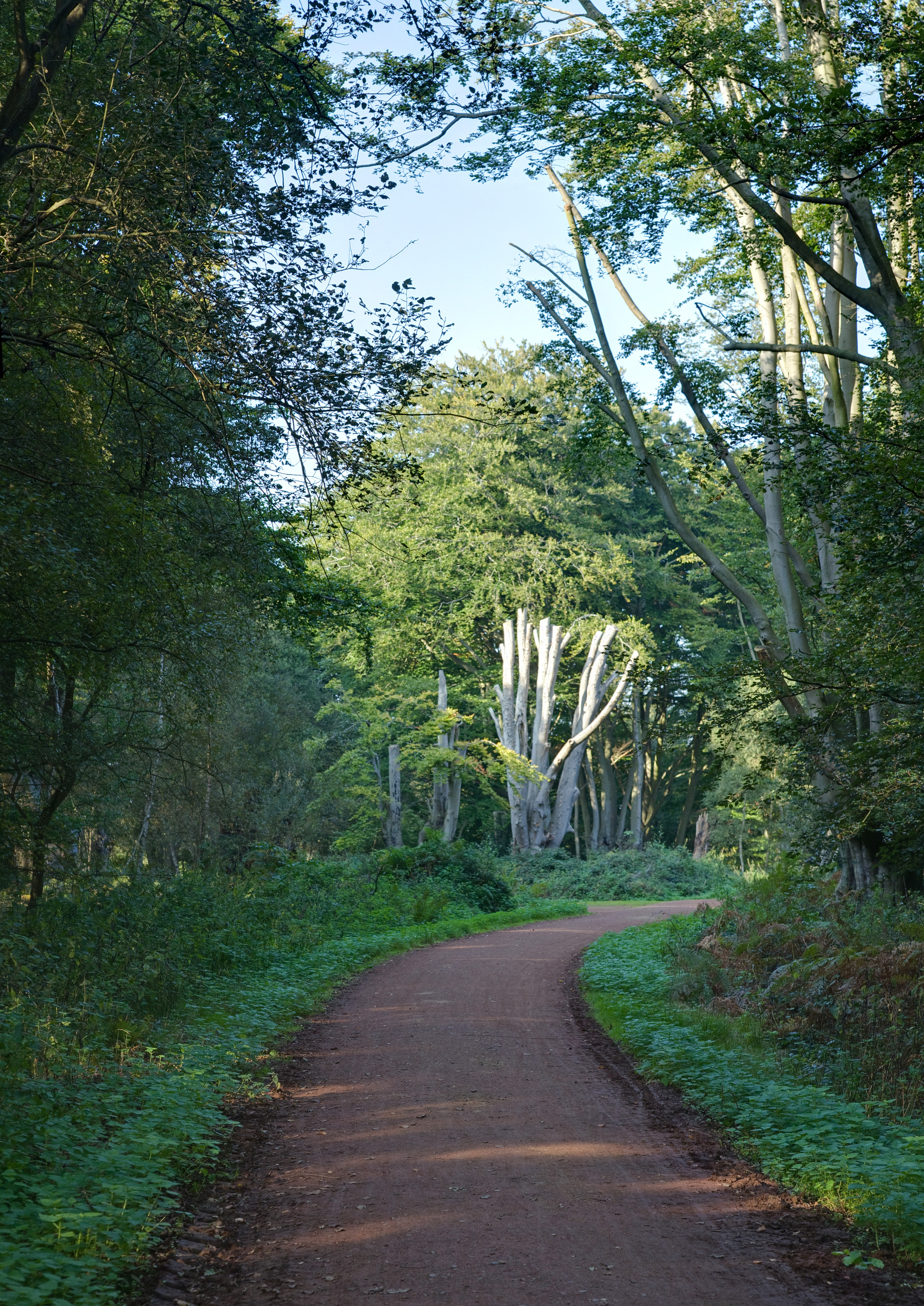
- Centenary walk

- Location within Essex
- OS grid reference: TQ4087198174
  - London: 11 mi (18 km) SW
- Civil parish: Waltham Abbey
- District: Epping Forest
- Shire county: Essex
- Region: East
- Country: England
- Sovereign state: United Kingdom
- Post town: Loughton
- Postcode district: IG10
- Dialling code: 020
- Police: Essex
- Fire: Essex
- Ambulance: East of England
- UK Parliament: Epping Forest

High Beach is a village inside Epping Forest in south-west Essex, England. Part of the civil parish of Waltham Abbey, the village is within the Epping Forest District and the ward of Waltham Abbey High Beach, and lies approximately 11 miles (18 km) north-east of Charing Cross.

It is the location of Lippitts Hill and the Metropolitan Police Air Support Unit.

== Elevations ==
High Beach is in the uplands of Essex, which reach heights of 110 metres (360 ft) above sea level on the western fringes of Epping Forest. Areas of the surrounding forest are also named High Beach or High Beech. However, individual smallholdings of land are given over to residential, agriculture and mixed uses, particularly beside the straight A-road which bisects it. Many of the forest paths are naturally gravel-lined with underlying deposits of Bagshot Sands. It is believed that the name High Beach came from an early description of the localised sand and gravel exposure in this part of the forest.

== The Church of the Holy Innocents ==
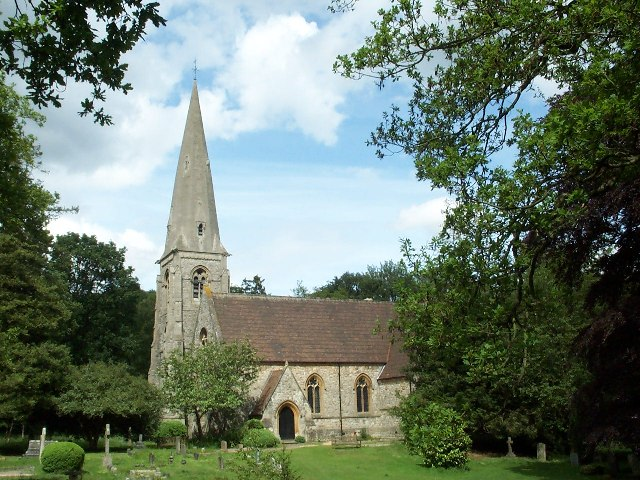
Church of the Holy Innocents

Holy Innocents' church is surrounded by forest. It was built in 1873 by Thomas Charles Baring to replace the earlier church (St Paul's) which was located in Church Road around 1 mile away from the present church's location and had fallen into disrepair. The new church was designed by the architect Arthur Blomfield, and was built in the Early English style at the cost of £5,500. It was consecrated in 1883 and became the parish church in 1884. The 125 feet (38 m) tower and spire contains 13 hemispherical bells cast at the Whitechapel Bell Foundry.

The church is Grade II listed, giving it legal protection from unauthorised modification or demolition.

In mid-2024, it was used as a filming location for Wake Up Dead Man, for scenes set in New York state.

== Notable residents ==
In July 1837, poet John Clare's deteriorating mental disorder caused him to be admitted to the High Beach private asylum under the guidance of the enlightened Dr Matthew Allen. The poet, after suffering from depression, was invited as a guest to Allen's asylum. Clare spent four years at the asylum before escaping in July 1841. Alfred, Lord Tennyson lived at Beech Hill House from 1837 to 1840. During his short stay he may well have encountered Clare and other inmates. Tennyson was reported by a journalist as being "...delighted with the mad people...the most agreeable and the most reasonable persons he has met with." The lawyer William St Julien Arabin lived at Beech House, later renamed Arabin House. The mixed martial arts pioneer Edward William Barton-Wright lived at The Lodge, High Beech, in 1932.

== Culture and community ==
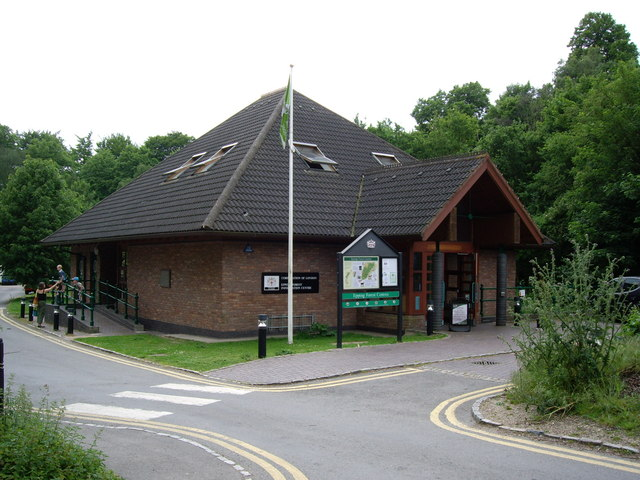
The Visitor Centre

Amenities include the church, primary school, horse riding school and three pubs: the Duke of Wellington (now closed), The King’s Oak and The Owl. Owned and managed by the London Borough of Waltham Forest, the Suntrap Forest Education Centre and The Field Studies Council Epping Forest Field Centre offers field studies and other activities to schools and other groups. (Note: Naturalist and author Fred J Speakman established the Epping Forest Field Studies Centre and later taught at the Suntrap.) Epping Forest Visitors’ Centre in Nursery Road is one of three visitor centres in the forest that provide learning, tours, exhibits and recreational facilities.

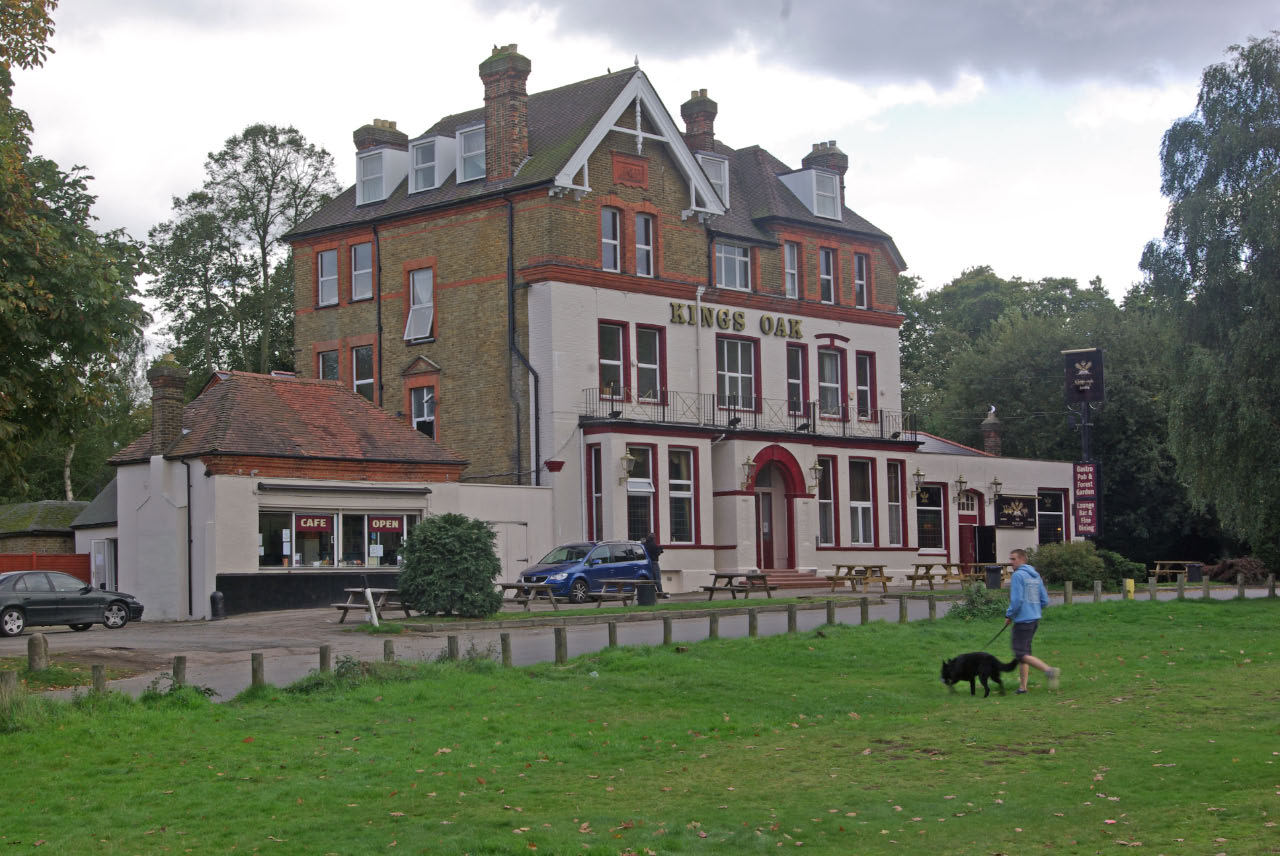
Kings Oak public house

== Sport and forest walks ==
In February 1928, an oval cinder circuit to the rear of the Kings Oak public house was the venue for Britain's first motorcycle speedway meeting.

Courses and appropriate tracks for outdoor pursuits include horse riding, mountain biking, orienteering and seasonally there are running events. The 15 miles (24 km) Epping Forest Centenary Walk passes through the locality. The route was established in 1978 to celebrate the 100th anniversary of the passing of the Epping Forest Act 1878. Section 18 of the London Loop, a long distance footpath, can be joined at nearby Sewardstone.

In Mott Street the High Beach Cricket Club play in Division 4 of the Herts & Essex League.

== Governance ==
High Beach is part of the civil parish of Waltham Abbey, and the parish council is Waltham Abbey Town Council.

The local authority is Epping Forest District Council. Residents of High Beach fall into the Waltham Abbey High Beach Ward, which also covers Sewardstone and Upshire. Traditionally, the ward has been a Conservative safe seat.

In the late 2000s, there was a strong showing for Green Party - but they failed to accumulate enough votes to win the ward - the support for them has since diminished. In the 2019 Local Elections, the Conservatives won with 60% of the vote.

== Transport links ==
Road

- Major roads A104, M25, A121 and the A112 pass through or close by to the locality.

Rail

- Chingford railway station is approximately 3 miles (4.8 km) away.

London Underground

- Loughton tube station is approximately 2 miles (3.2 km) away.

Bus

- London bus route 215 serves the A112 Sewardstone Road, approximately 1 mile (1.6 km) away. Arriva route 66 connects into Loughton and runs approximately hourly to the fringes of the village close to the Woodbine pub.

== Notes and references ==
Notes
