= Epping Forest =

Ancient woodland and former royal forest in Essex and Greater London

Coordinates: 51.66°N 0.05°E

- Site of Special Scientific Interest
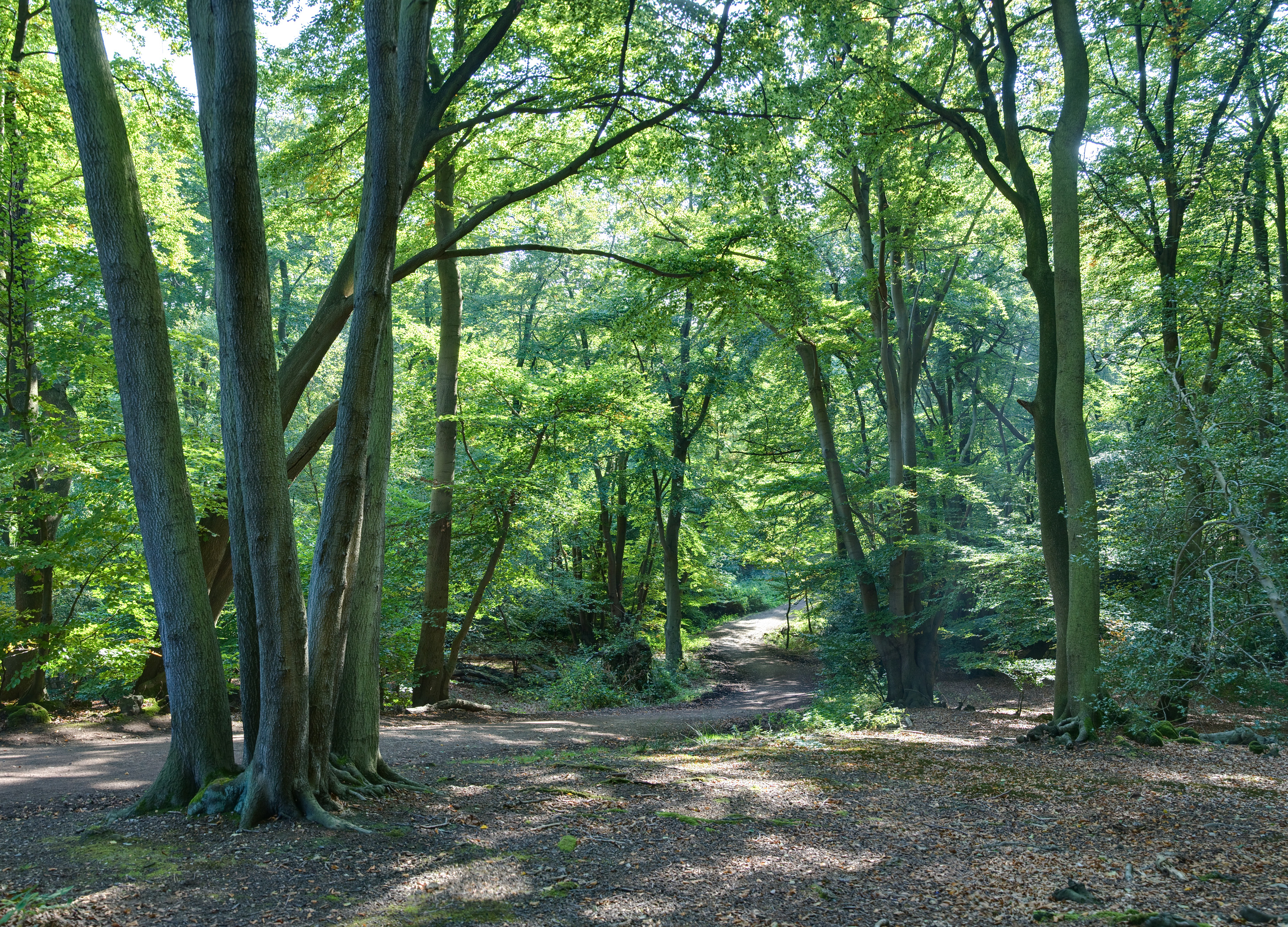
- Centenary Walk trail, south of High Beech
- Location of Epping Forest.
- Area of search: Greater London; Essex
- Grid reference: TL475035 to TQ 405865
- Interest: Biological
- Area: SSSI: 4,270 acres (1,730 ha); Total: circa 5,900 acres (2,400 ha)
- Notification date: 1990
- Location map: Magic Map

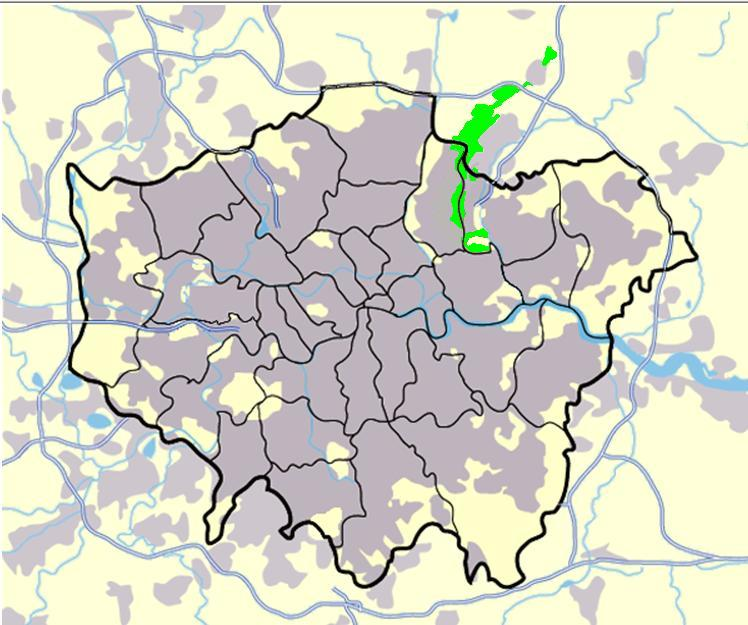
Location of Epping Forest (shown in green) within Greater London and Essex

The green line shows the boundaries of the various compartments of Epping Forest SSSI. The three visitor centres are:
1 Epping Forest Gateway, which includes Queen Elizabeth Hunting Lodge & The View visitor centre
2 Epping Forest Visitor Centre, High Beach
3 The Temple, Wanstead Park, visitor centre

Epping Forest is a 2,400-hectare (5,900-acre) area of ancient woodland, and other established habitats, which straddles the border between Greater London and Essex. The main body of the forest stretches from Epping in the north, to Chingford on the edge of the London built-up area. South of Chingford, the forest narrows and becomes a green corridor extending deep into east London, as far as Forest Gate; the forest's position gives rise to its nickname, the Cockney Paradise. It is the largest forest in London.

It lies on a ridge between the valleys of the rivers Lea and Roding. It contains areas of woodland, grassland, heath, streams, bogs, and ponds, and its elevation and thin gravelly soil (the result of glaciation) historically made it less suitable for agriculture. The forest was historically managed as a common; the land was held by a number of local landowners who exercised economic rights over aspects such as timber, while local commoners had grazing and other rights. It was designated a royal forest, meaning that only the monarch had the right to hunt deer.

The extensive urban areas on the forest's edges bring many visitors to the forest, and cause a strain on the forest's ecology; however, local recreational users of the forest were crucial in saving the forest when it was threatened with enclosure and destruction in the late 19th century. The huge public outcry led the City of London Corporation to buy and so save the site in what was the first major success of the environmental movement in Europe – the corporation still owns the forest.

The forest gives its name to the Epping Forest local government district, which covers part of it, and to Forest School, a private school in Walthamstow towards the south of it.

== History ==
=== Early history ===
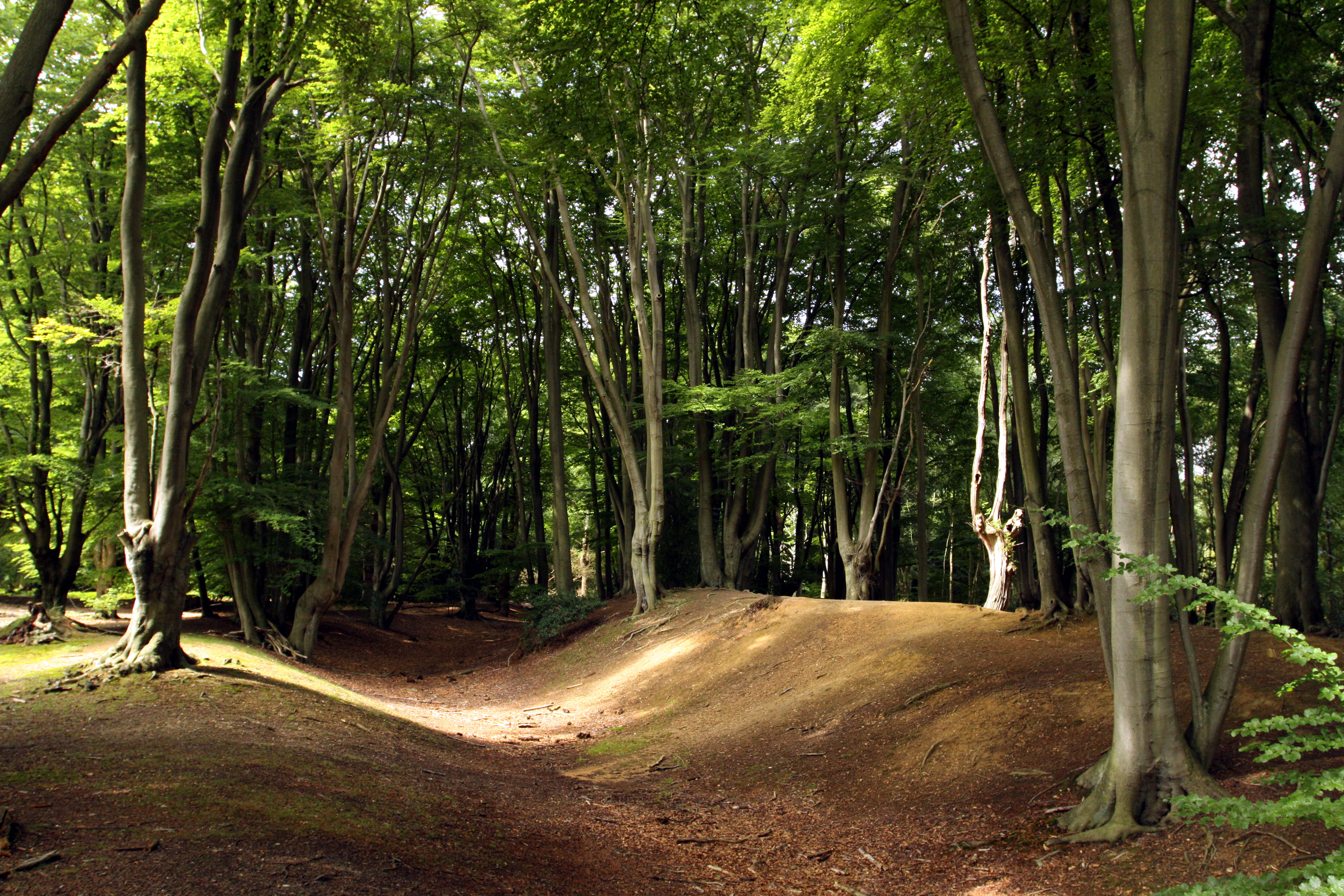
The ramparts of Ambresburg Banks hill fort

The area that became Epping Forest has been continuously wooded since Neolithic times. Embankments of two Iron Age hill forts – Loughton Camp and Ambresbury Banks – can be found in the woodland, but pollen profiles show that Iron Age occupation had no significant effect on woodland cover. The former small leaved lime (also known as pry or linden) dominated woodland permanently changed during the Anglo-Saxon period, possibly as a result of the selective cutting of trees. Today's beech-birch and oak-hornbeam-dominated forest may be the result of partial forest clearance in Saxon times.

=== Management of the forest ===
The area is thought to have been given legal status as a royal forest by Henry II in the 12th century. At the time, it was part of the much larger Forest of Essex, which covered nearly all of the county. The term "forest" was a legal term, meaning that Forest Law applied, so only the king had the right to hunt deer. The term did not mean the land was well wooded; the large majority of the Forest of Essex was agricultural land.

The Forest of Essex gradually shrank in size as land was removed from Forest Law, and it was replaced by a number of much smaller forests, including Waltham Forest (which gives its name to the modern London Borough of Waltham Forest. Waltham Forest was a legally defined area which included the areas later known as Epping Forest and Hainault Forest; the rest of the Waltham Forest area was only lightly wooded.

In physical terms (rather than legal terms), the forest is thought to have declined to something like its modern extent in the early 14th century (possibly long before). The Black Death reached England in 1348, leading to a huge decline in population, perhaps between a third and a half, which took away the pressure on woods and commons, leading to a very long period of stability in the area of these land uses in England. At that time, the forest extended slightly further south to the Romford Road in the Forest Gate area of West Ham; that is, the original Roman A118 road from Aldgate on the City of London wall to Stratford, Romford, and Colchester (and also known as the Great Essex Road). On the Romford Road lay a coppiced woodland called Hamfrith Wood (meaning the woodland belonging to the Ham area) until around 1700, as well as an area of plain called Hamfrith Waste, which lasted into the mid-1800s.

Most of Waltham Forest was later legally deforested (removed from Forest Law), leaving two smaller forests, Epping Forest and Hainault Forest, both of which continued to be very heavily wooded; no reduction in the physical area of woods and commons occurred. The name "Epping Forest" was first recorded in the 17th century.

Although the monarch held hunting and associated rights, by the time of King Henry II in the 12th century, the ownership of the uncultivated forest "wastes" had been granted to numerous manors. Many of these manors were held by religious communities, but after the dissolution of the monasteries in the 16th century, they were appropriated by the Crown and sold on to private owners. Within these manors, the woodland was managed as common land, where the lord of the manor benefitted from certain rights, while local commoners, who where freeholders and copyhold tennants, benefitted from common rights; estovers, the right to cut or gather firewood and foodstuffs, grazing rights, and pannage, which was turning out pigs for mast, i.e. acorns and beech nuts. The landscape was primarily a mixture of wood pasture and open plains, rather than thick woodland, and both of these land-use types were grazed by cattle.

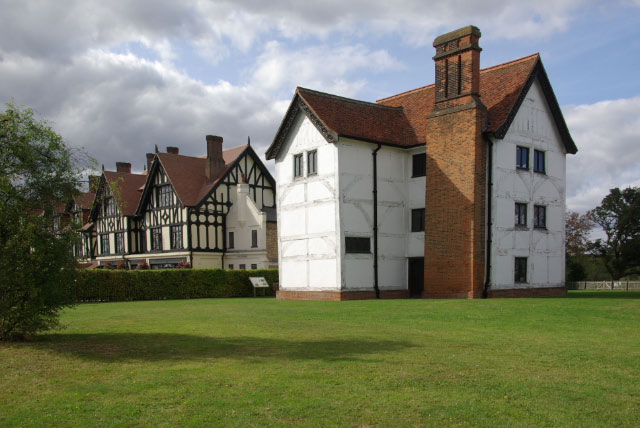
Queen Elizabeth's Hunting Lodge, Chingford

=== Queen Elizabeth's Hunting Lodge ===
In Tudor times, Henry VIII and Queen Elizabeth I may have hunted in the forest, though no documentary evidence has survived to prove it. In 1543, Henry commissioned a building, known as Great Standing, from which to view the chase at Chingford. The building was renovated in 1589 for Queen Elizabeth I and can still be seen today in Chingford. The building is now known as Queen Elizabeth's Hunting Lodge, and is open to the public. Another hunt standing now forms the core of the forest headquarters at The Warren, Loughton.

=== 17th to 19th centuries ===
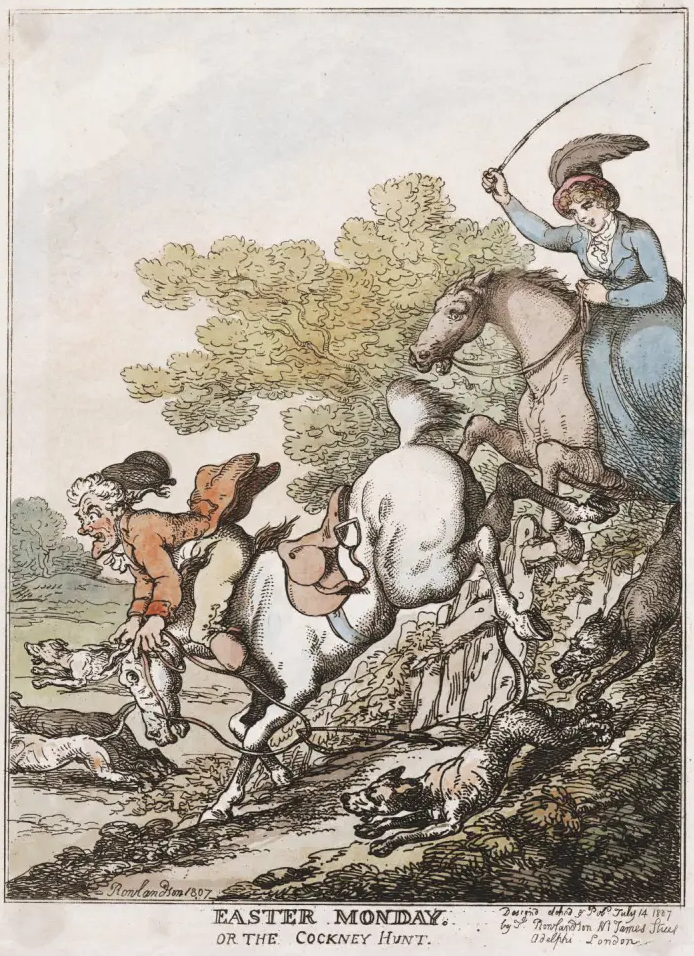
An 1807 caricature by Thomas Rowlandson, ridicules ordinary Londoners at the Easter Monday stag hunt, a sport usually reserved for the wealthy.

Following the Restoration of the Monarchy in 1660, although the deer herd was restocked, royal hunting in the forest never recommenced. The forest was principally used as a source of shipbuilding timber for the Royal Navy, which was taken overland to Barking Creek and then floated in rafts to the Royal Dockyards at Woolwich and Deptford. This exploitation continued until about 1725, when all the suitable oak trees had been felled.

The City of London maintained the ancient tradition of an Easter Monday stag hunt in the forest, but official participation ended in 1807, when the office of Master of the City Hounds was abolished. In 1827, huntsman of Sir William Pole-Tylney-Long-Wellesley chased a forest stag as far as West Ham. The customary Easter Monday hunt was repeated annually by a large and rowdy crowd of ordinary London tradesmen and working people, who gathered at Fairmead Oak to chase a previously captured stag, which was released from a cart and usually escaped unharmed. The last of these hunts was in 1882, when it descended into a riot and had to be dispersed by the police.

In the 1830s, the forest took its first significant harm in centuries when a new road, the Epping New Road, was built through the forest, to supplement pre-existing ancient roads. In 1830, civil engineer James Nicoll McAdam, the son of John Loudon McAdam, was engaged by a turnpike trust, the Epping and Ongar Highway Trust, to construct a road from Woodford Green to Epping through the heart of the forest, to avoid Goldings Hill on the old road through Loughton and shorten the distance by one mile. The Epping New Road, once part of the A11 and now part of the A104, was completed in 1834.

With the arrival of railway stations in towns close to the forest from the 1850s, the working class people of East London began to use the forest for recreation on Sundays and public holidays, in ever increasing numbers. Others arrived by horse-drawn omnibus, which could drive directly to popular spots like High Beach. On Whit Monday 1880, a parliamentary committee estimated that up to 400,000 people had visited Epping Forest on that day.

=== Fighting enclosure ===
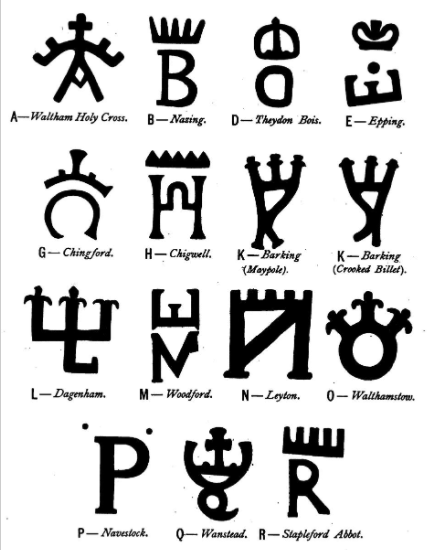
The marks used by the Reeves of Epping Forest to brand Commoner's cattle turned out to graze in the "forest. wastes": The marks denote the parishes entitled to this right, and consist of a letter surmounted by crown or a cross.

In the first decades of the 19th century, the Lord Warden of Epping Forest, William Long-Wellesley, acquiesced to the enclosure of 3,000 acres (1,200 ha) of forest land, about a third of the remaining total, by the lords of the manors who held freeholds in the forest. The government was keen to enclose land for farming and building development and allowed the Commissioners of Woods, Forests and Land Revenues to sell off further freeholds in the forest.

In 1851 nearby Hainault Forest, where the Crown owned most of the land, was privatised (enclosed) and nearly all of the trees grubbed out to turn the area into poor-quality farmland. The modern conservation movement grew out of public disgust at the destruction of Hainault Forest and the need to protect its sister forest, Epping Forest. Epping Forest had fragmented ownership, which made enclosing it in the same way difficult, though individual landowners began to make encroachments. The urbanisation of nearby areas increased the forest's importance as an area of public recreation helped lead to the establishment of the Open Spaces Society in 1865, whose aim was to protect commons in and around London. The Mile End branch, founded in the February of that year, was particularly important in mobilising East End environmentalism.

By 1870, the unenclosed forest had shrunk to only 3,500 acres (1,400 ha). One landowner, Reverend John Whitaker Maitland, who had enclosed 1,100 acres (450 ha) in his manor of Loughton, was engaged in a long running dispute with a commoner called Thomas Willingale and his family, who insisted on maintaining his right to lop trees in the forest, despite inducements offered for him to stop. The matter came to the public attention in 1866, when Willingale's son and two nephews were fined for damaging Maitland's trees, and were sent to prison for seven days when they refused to pay. Willingale was encouraged to continue the dispute by Edward Buxton and other members of the Commons Preservation Society, however a court action against Maitland lapsed in 1870 when Willingale died.

Epping Forest Act 1871 (Note: Section 1.)
- Act of Parliament
- Parliament of the United Kingdom
- Long title: An Act to amend the Act twelfth and thirteenth Victoria chapter eighty-one; and to extend the provisions of that Act and The Metropolitan Commons Act, 1866, so far as regards that part of Waltham Forest known as Epping Forest.
- Citation: 34 & 35 Vict. c. 93
- Territorial extent: United Kingdom

Dates
- Royal assent: 21 August 1871
- Commencement: 21 August 1871 (Note: The Acts of Parliament (Commencement) Act 1793.)
- Repealed: 1 July 1971
Other legislation
Amends	New Forest and Waltham Forest Act 1849
Amended by	Epping Forest Amendment Act 1872
Repealed by	Wild Creatures and Forest Laws Act 1971
Relates to	Metropolitan Commons Act 1866

Status: Repealed

Text of statute as originally enacted

Epping Forest Amendment Act 1872
- Act of Parliament
- Parliament of the United Kingdom
- Long title: An Act to enlarge the powers of the Epping Forest Commissioners; and for other purposes.
- Citation: 35 & 36 Vict. c. 95
- Territorial extent: United Kingdom

Dates
- Royal assent: 10 August 1872
- Commencement: 10 August 1872
- Repealed: 1 July 1971
Other legislation
Amends	Epping Forest Act 1871
Repealed by	Wild Creatures and Forest Laws Act 1971

Status: Repealed

Text of statute as originally enacted

Epping Forest Act 1875 (Note: Section 4.)
- Act of Parliament
- Parliament of the United Kingdom
- Long title: An Act to extend the Time for the Epping Forest Commissioners to make their Final Report.
- Citation: 38 & 39 Vict. c. 6
- Territorial extent: United Kingdom

Dates
- Royal assent: 19 March 1875
- Commencement: 19 March 1875
- Repealed: 1 July 1971
Other legislation
Repealed by	Wild Creatures and Forest Laws Act 1971

Status: Repealed

Text of statute as originally enacted

In July 1871, around 30,000 East Londoners gathered on Wanstead Flats to protest about fences which had been erected there by Earl Cowley to enclose forest land. Despite clashes with police, including a mounted element, the crowd were able to break down and smash the enclosing fences. The action attracted nationwide attention, much of it critical of the government. At this stage the City of London Corporation became involved, since in 1853, the city had purchased a farm at Manor Park for the construction of the City of London Cemetery; this made the City Corporation a forest commoner with the right to graze cattle in the forest. In 1871, the City brought a suit against 16 of the lords of the forest manors, claiming that the enclosures impinged on their ancient grazing rights. Following an appeal in 1874, a judgment by the Master of the Rolls, Sir George Jessel, ruled that all enclosures made since 1851 were illegal. Subsequently, two acts of Parliament in 1871 (34 & 35 Vict. c. 93) and 1872 (35 & 36 Vict. c. 95) allowed the city to purchase the 19 forest manors. The consequence of this victory was that only 10% of Epping Forest had been lost to enclosure (mainly in the south), compared to 92% of Hainault Forest.

Under the terms of the Epping Forest Act 1878, the forest ceased to be a royal forest and was purchased by the City of London Corporation whose Epping Forest Committee act as Conservators. The committee is composed of twelve members of the Court of Common Council and four Verderers who are residents of the forest and are elected by the Commoners. A Superintendent is responsible for operational management, supported by twelve Epping Forest Keepers. In addition, the Crown's right to venison was terminated, and pollarding was no longer allowed, although grazing rights continued. This act laid down a stipulation that the Conservators "shall at all times keep Epping Forest unenclosed and unbuilt on as an open space for the recreation and enjoyment of the people". In compensation for the loss of lopping rights, Lopping Hall in Loughton was built as a community building. This was the first major victory, in Europe, for the modern conservation movement.

=== "The People's Forest" ===
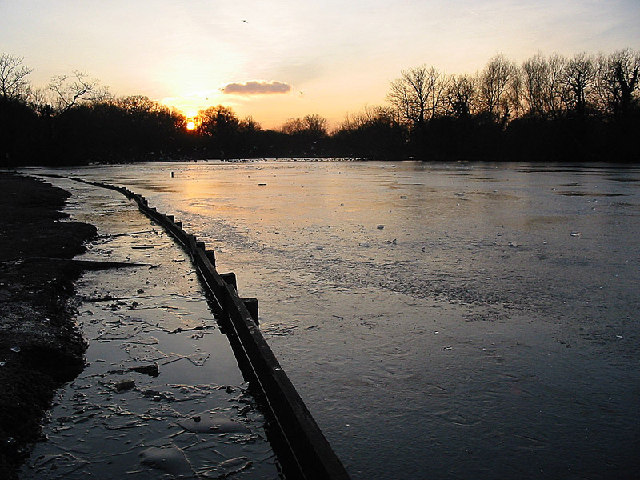
Connaught Water, an ornamental lake of 8 acres (3.2 ha) named after the Duke of Connaught, the first forest ranger

When Queen Victoria visited Chingford on 6 May 1882 she declared "It gives me the greatest satisfaction to dedicate this beautiful forest to the use and enjoyment of my people for all time" and it thus became "The People's Forest". The City of London Corporation still manages Epping Forest in strict conformity with the Epping Forest Act. This care is funded from 'City's Cash', the private funds of the Corporation rather than any money for its upkeep coming from local rates or taxes. The Conservators administer the forest from The Warren, modern offices built in the grounds of Grade II* listed Warren House, Loughton. Warren House, formerly known as the Reindeer Inn, was built around a smaller hunt standing, known as the Little Standing. Its grounds were redesigned by Humphry Repton in the early 19th century.

Until the outbreak of BSE in 1996 commoners still exercised their right to graze cattle and every summer herds of cattle would roam freely in the southern part of the forest. Cattle were reintroduced in 2001 but their movements are now more restricted to reduce conflict with traffic. Commoners, who are people who live in a Forest parish and own 0.5 acres (0.20 ha) of land, can still register and graze cattle during the summer months.

The right to collect wood still exists but is rarely practised and is limited to "one faggot of dead or driftwood" per day per adult resident.

Originally a barn built in the mid-19th century the Grade II listed building Butler's Retreat is one of the few remaining Victorian retreats within the forest. The building, which is adjacent to the Queen Elizabeth Hunting Lodge, takes its name from the 1891 occupier John Butler. Retreats originally served non-alcoholic refreshments as part of the Temperance movement. After closing in 2009 the building was refurbished by the City of London Corporation and re-opened as a café in 2012.

On 12 July 2012 The Duke of Gloucester—the official Epping Forest Ranger—opened the View interpretation centre at Chingford. The building, a former Victorian coach house and stables, together with Queen Elizabeth's Hunting Lodge and Butler's Retreat form the Epping Forest Gateway.

== Geography ==
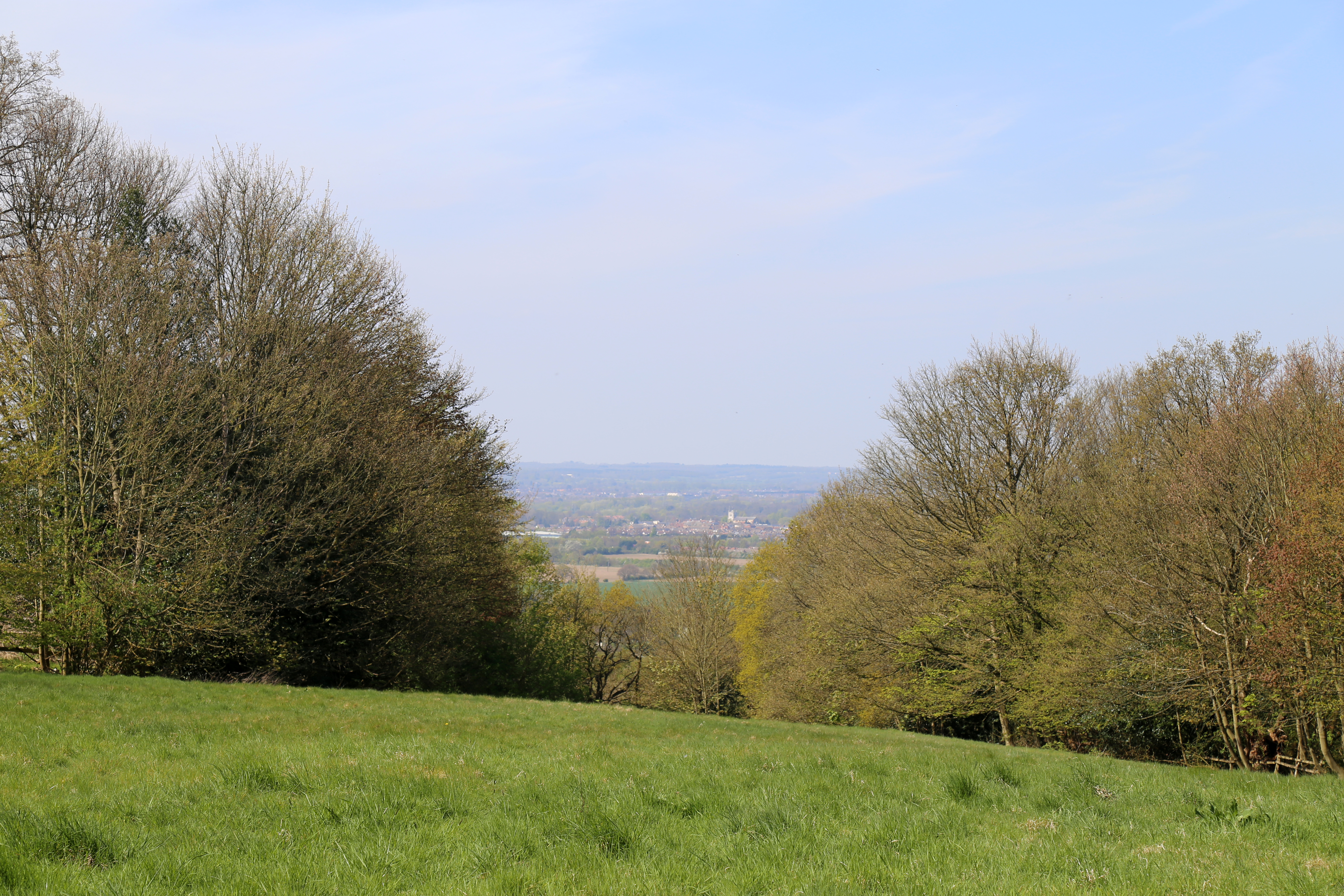
A view across the Lea Valley from High Beach.

The forest is approximately 19 kilometres (12 mi) long in the north–south direction, but no more than 4 kilometres (2.5 mi) from east to west at its widest point, and in most places considerably narrower. The main body of the forest stretches from Epping in the north, to Chingford on the edge of the London built-up area. South of Chingford the forest narrows, and forms a green corridor that extends deep into East London, as far as Forest Gate. The southern part of the forest was always narrower but enclosure and other destruction in the 19th and 20th centuries mean that this is now more pronounced. The southernmost point of the Forest is now Wanstead Flats but it formerly extended slightly further south, to the Romford Road.

The forest occupies a ridge of higher ground, the Epping Forest Ridge, set between the valleys of the Rivers Lea and Roding. These valleys were formed by arms of the Scandinavian ice sheet during the last glacial period, around 18,000 BC. The ridge consists of boulder clay topped with loam, while towards its southern end it is overlain with glacial gravel. The highest points are near Ambresbury Banks to the south of Epping, which is 111 metres (384 feet) above sea level, while Pole Hill near Chingford reaches 91 metres (299 feet). On the western edge of the ridge, High Beach at a similar height, is an expanse of gravel and Bagshot sand, thought to have been deposited by an unknown river which flowed northwards from the Weald of Kent before the creation of the Thames Valley.

The following is a simplified list of the various parts of Epping Forest, starting from the north:

- Lower Forest; a triangular expanse of oak and hornbeam wood just north of the town of Epping which separates it from the main body of the forest.
- Bell Common and Epping Thicks; the forest area directly to the south of Epping. Bell Common includes a cricket pitch, the M25 motorway passes underneath enclosed in a tunnel. Epping Thicks is the location of Ambresbury Banks Iron Age fort.
- Genesis Slade; an area of unpollarded beech, oak and hornbeam on the eastern edge of the forest towards Theydon Bois.
- Great Monk Wood; a large area of pollarded beech and hornbeam astride the Epping New Road, reaching the outskirts of Loughton in the east.
- High Beech; an open sandy ridge to the west of the forest, with views to Waltham Abbey and across the Lea Valley.
- Bury Wood and Chingford Plain; the southwestern part of the main forest extending to Chingford, where the plain includes a golf course.
- Knighton Wood and Lords Bushes; an isolated area of forest at Buckhurst Hill, the former being previously landscaped parkland which was added to the forest in 1930.
- Hatch Forest and Highams Park; a strip of forest extending south from Chingford along the River Ching. Highams Park Lake was designed by Humphry Repton in 1794 and was added to the forest in 1891.
- Woodford Green; an area of grassland lined by trees, including a cricket pitch.
- Walthamstow Forest and Gilbert's Slade a continuation of the forest southwards from Woodford Green, straddling the North Circular Road and extending towards Whipps Cross.
- Leyton Flats; stretch between Snaresbrook, Whipps Cross and the Green Man at Leytonstone. Largely open grassland with the Eagle and Hollow Ponds.
- Bush Wood and Wanstead Flats; extend east from Leytonstone towards Forest Gate and Manor Park. Mostly open grassland featuring football pitches and several ponds.
- Wanstead Park; an enclosed area of the forest with restricted opening; formerly the landscaped parkland of Wanstead House demolished in 1825, the park was added to the forest in 1880.

== Ecology and habitats ==
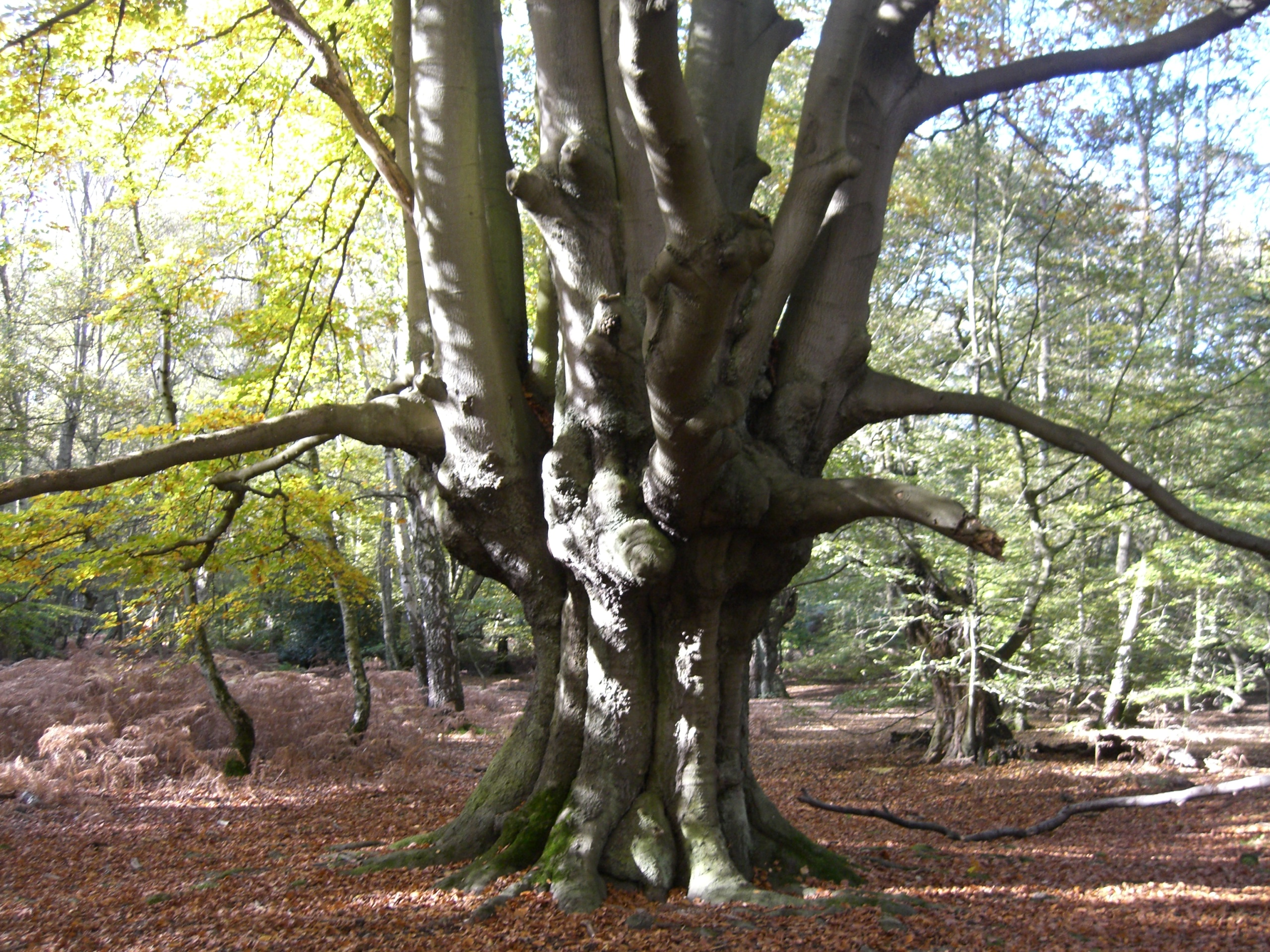
An overgrown Beech pollard, in Epping Forest

The age of the forest and the range of habitats it contains make it a valuable area for wildlife, and it is designated as a Site of Special Scientific Interest. Its former status a common, with wood-pasture and plains has had a great effect on its ecology. Although the Epping Forest Act almost certainly saved the forest from total destruction, it has to some extent had a deleterious effect on the area's biodiversity.

=== Wood pasture ===
The areas historic land use has had an enormous impact on the areas character and ecology, this is particularly evident with the pollarded trees, which were cut back to the bolling, the permanent base of the pollard, every 13 years or so. The bolling was cut just above the browse line of wild and domestic grazing animals. However, the Forests pollards have not been cut since the passing of the Epping Forest Act, have now grown massive crowns of thick, trunk-like branches with correspondingly large boles. This gives the trees an unusual appearance, uncommon in other forests. Often the weight of the branches cannot be supported by the parent tree, and the large amount of dead wood in the forest supports numerous rare species of fungi and invertebrates. Epping Forest has 55,000 ancient trees, more than any other single site in the United Kingdom.

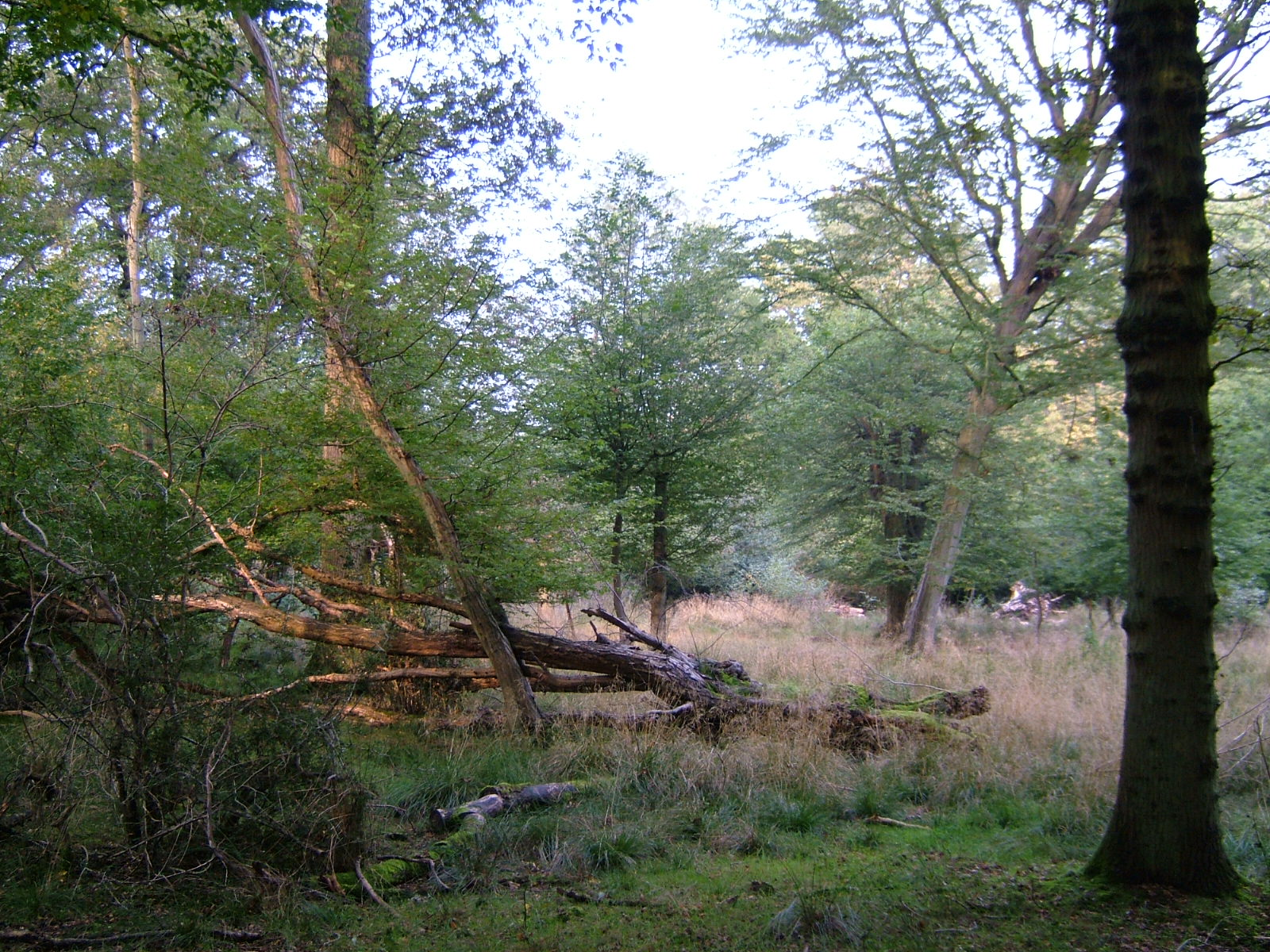
Secondary woodland in Epping Forest

Predominant tree species are pedunculate oak (Quercus robur), European beech (Fagus sylvatica), European hornbeam (Carpinus betuloides), silver birch (Betula pendula) and European holly (Ilex aquifolium). Indicator species of long-uninterrupted woodland include service-tree (Sorbus torminalis), butcher's-broom (Ruscus aculeatus), and drooping sedge (Carex pendula).

The pollarded trees allowed light through to the woodland floor, increasing the numbers of low-growing plants. Since the Act, the vast crowns of the pollards cut out most of the light to the underbrush.

=== Plains ===
The plains were located in wet or low-lying areas. The area surrounding the forest is now to a great extent urbanised; the corresponding reduction in grazing has led to some former areas of grassland and heathland being overcome by secondary woodland.

=== Restoration work ===
In recent years, the Conservators have experimented with pollarding in selected areas of the forest, lopping some old pollards back to the bolling (with mixed results) or creating new bollings. A herd of English Longhorn cattle has been reintroduced to graze the heathland and grassland.

=== Lakes and ponds ===
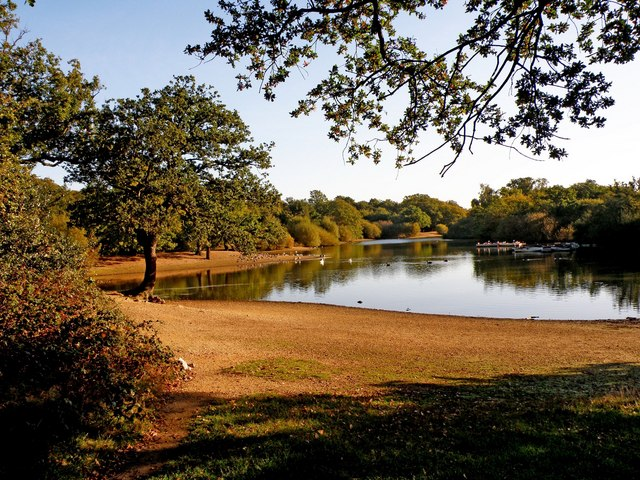
Hollow Pond, a former gravel pit on Leyton Flats near Whipps Cross.

Over 100 lakes and ponds can be found within the forest varying in size and age. They all provide important habitats for numerous species of fauna and flora. Many of them are man-made with the majority of them created through gravel extraction. Several were formed as part of a landscape design and a few were the result of Second World War bombs and V-2 rockets. Activities allowed on the waters include angling which is permitted in 24 of the lakes and ponds. A wide range of freshwater fish can be caught. All of the lakes and ponds are accessible to the public and are located on or close to forest paths.

=== Fauna ===
A wide range of animals are found, including fallow deer (Dama dama), muntjac (Muntiacus reevesi) and European adder (Vipera berus).

==== Deer ====
The fallow deer found in Epping Forest are of an unusual black colouration, perhaps descended from some black deer presented by King Christian IV of Denmark to James I in 1612, although there are earlier records of black deer in England before this date. By 1878 when the Epping Forest Act gave the deer firm legal protection, poaching had reduced the herd to twelve does and one buck; however, numbers had recovered to around 200 by the start of the 20th century. In 1954, it was noted that common lighter-brown fallow deer had begun to interbreed in the forest and some black examples were sent to Whipsnade Zoo to preserve this variety. Subsequently, losses to traffic and dogs prompted the establishment of an enclosed deer sanctuary of 109 acres (44 ha) near Debden, to maintain a stock of deer which can be released back into the forest when the population levels become too low.

Red deer were once found in Epping Forest, but the last survivors were rounded-up and taken to Windsor Great Park at the end of the 19th century. The last recorded sighting of roe deer in the forest was in 1920. In recent decades, Reeves's muntjac have been reported in the southern part of the forest. The announcement of licensed culling of fallow deer and muntjac in forest "buffer land" in 2016 was criticised by local residents but defended by environmentalists as necessary to prevent over-grazing of woodland undergrowth.

== Planning designations ==
- Most of the forest, an area of 1,728 hectares (4,270 acres) is a Site of Special Scientific Interest
- The forest is a Special Area of Conservation.
- Most of the Forest is part of the Metropolitan Green Belt.
- Much of the Forest is designated as Metropolitan Open Land.

== Leisure activities ==
A wide variety of leisure activities associated with the forest, most notably rambling, cycling and horse riding.

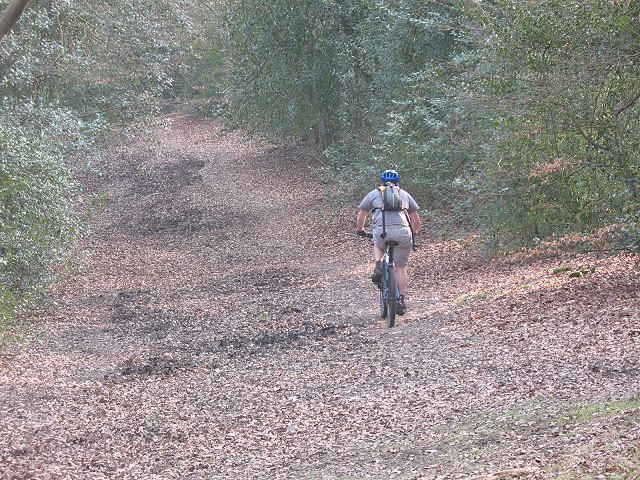
Mountain biking in Epping Forest.

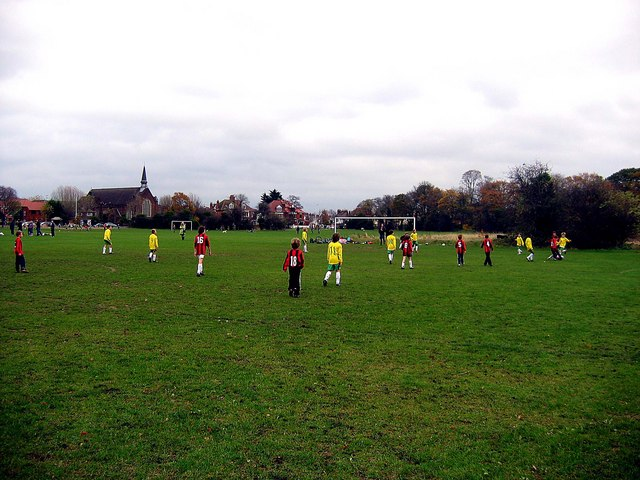
A youth football match on Wanstead Flats.

Epping Forest attracts large numbers of mountain bikers. Mountain biking is generally permitted except around the Iron Age camps, Loughton Brook and other ecologically or geomorphologically sensitive areas. Despite clear signposting, a minority of mountain bikers and horse riders continue to cause damage in these areas, and the Conservators of Epping Forest have expressed their concern. A number of clubs organise rides, particularly on Sunday mornings. The forest is also used as a training area for many national level mountain-bike racers as it is highly regarded for its fast and tight flowing single track trails. This type of terrain is known within the mountain bike fraternity as cross country (or XC). Epping Forest was a potential venue for the mountain-biking event of the 2012 Summer Olympics, though the final choice was near Hadleigh Castle. Stage 3 of the 2014 Tour de France passed through the forest from Epping to Buckhurst Hill along the Epping New Road.

Horse riding is popular in Epping Forest. Riders need to be registered with the Epping Forest conservators before they are allowed to ride in the forest. Running as a form of recreation in Epping Forest goes back almost to the birth of the sport in the 1870s, including hosting the inaugural English Championships in 1876. Orienteering and rambling are also popular. There are numerous guidebooks offering shorter walks for the casual visitor. The most important event in the ramblers' calendar in the area is the traditional Epping Forest Centenary Walk, an all-day event commemorating the saving of Epping Forest as a public space, which takes place annually on the third Sunday in September.

High Beach in Epping Forest was the first British venue for motorcycle speedway and opened on 19 February 1928. The track was behind The King's Oak public house, and drew large crowds in its early days. The track was closed when a swimming pool was added to the pub's grounds after the Second World War, though enthusiasts and veterans still gather at the site every year on the nearest Sunday to 19 February. The remains of the track are still visible, in the grounds of the Epping Forest Field Centre behind the King's Oak. The field centre in the forest, run by Field Studies Council provides a variety of courses.

There are 60 pitches for football with changing facilities on forest land at Wanstead Flats, which are used by amateur and youth teams. There is a public 18-hole golf course at Chingford Plain, which is also used by the Royal Epping Forest Golf Club, Chingford Golf Club and Chingford Ladies' Golf Club. The course was established in the forest in 1888. Cricket is played on forest land at Woodford Green, Bell Common (Epping), Buckhurst Hill, and High Beach. One historic match is recorded in the forest in 1732 between London Cricket Club and Essex & Hertfordshire. The result is unknown. The match is the earliest known reference to both Essex and Hertfordshire as county teams.

== Visitor centres ==
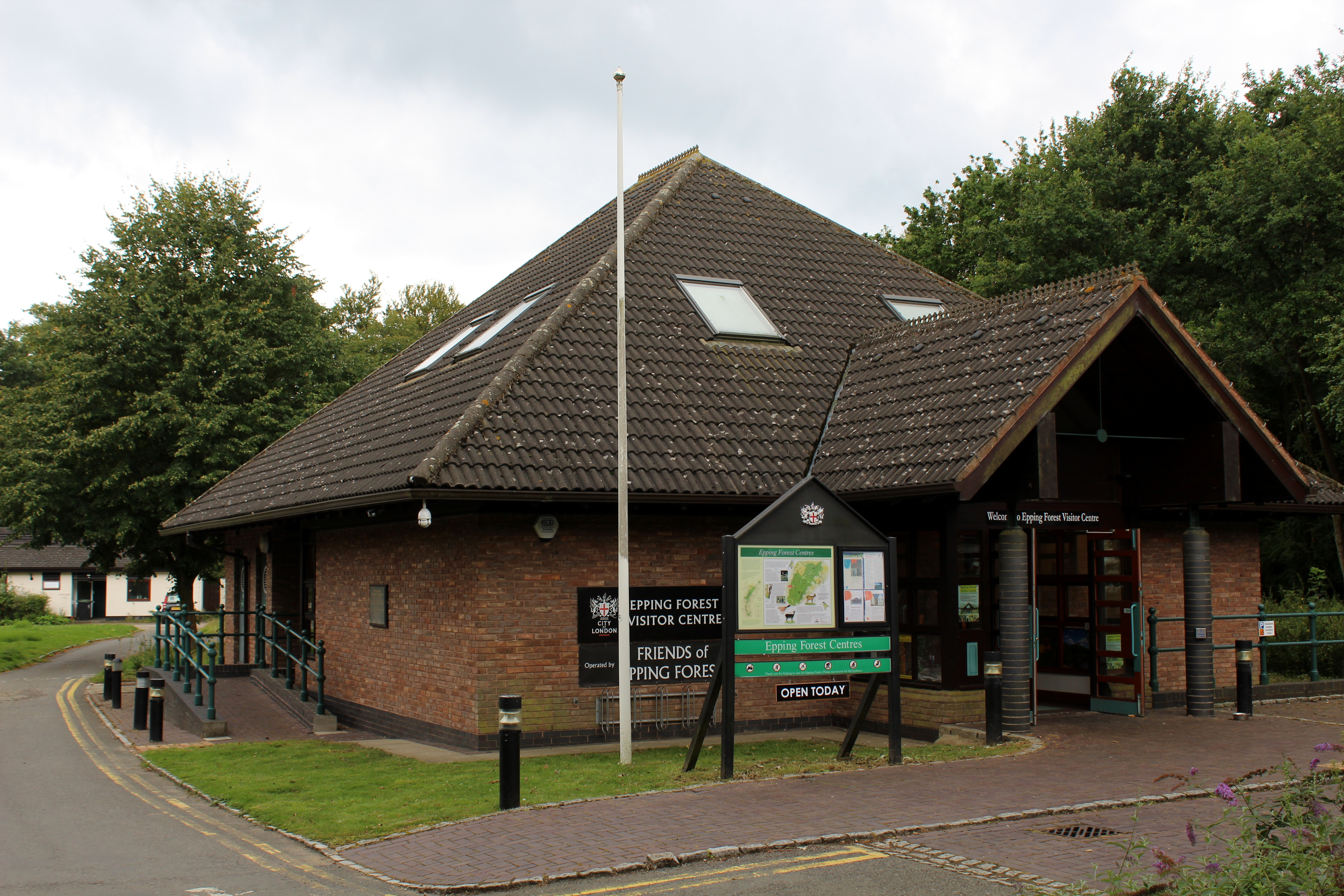
The Epping Forest Visitor Centre at High Beach

The forest has three visitor centres:

- Epping Forest Visitor Centre at Paul's Nursery Road, High Beach, managed by the Epping Forest Heritage Trust
- Epping Forest Gateway at Ranger's Road, Chingford
- The Temple in Wanstead Park

== Public transport ==
Public transport serves most locations in and around the forest. The forest is accessible from most London Underground Central Line stations between Leytonstone and Epping and London Overground between Wood Street and Chingford and at the very southern end by the Elizabeth line at Manor Park.

In the 1980s, the name "Forest" was given to one of the districts in which London's buses was divided, covering east London, and including the south part of the forest. Its logo was a squirrel above the London Transport roundel. Later, from 1989 until its collapse in 1991, London Forest part of London Buses Limited, was the name of an arms length bus operating unit of London Regional Transport in the area, with an oak tree as its logo.

== Cultural associations ==
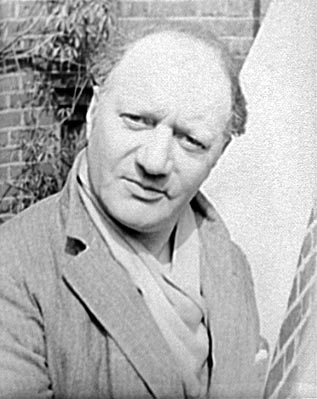
The sculptor Jacob Epstein created a series of paintings of the forest

Epping Forest has frequently been the setting for novels, and has attracted poets, artists and musicians for centuries. Many of these artists lived at Loughton. Loughton is also home to the East 15 Acting School and its Corbett Theatre.

=== Fine art ===
Sculptor Jacob Epstein lived on the very edge of the forest for a quarter of a century at Baldwins Hill, Loughton. Epstein in his Autobiography (1955) says that he wanted his sculpture Visitation, now in the Tate Collection, to be sited overlooking the forest. In 1933, he exhibited 100 paintings of the forest, and continued to paint during the war. His gouache, an essay in green tints and textures, Pool – Epping Forest, of Baldwins Hill Pond, was exhibited in 1945. Many of his forest painting are in the Garman Ryan Collection at the New Art Gallery, Walsall

=== Literature ===
Elizabethan poets such as George Gascoigne and Thomas Lodge lived in and around the forest. The writer Lady Mary Wroth lived at Loughton Hall. Ben Jonson, best known for his satirical play The Alchemist, was a frequent visitor to the forest with George Chapman.

In Daniel Defoe's novel A Journal of the Plague Year (1722), a group of Londoners try to escape the plague by settling in and around Epping Forest.

In the 18th century, Mary Wollstonecraft, writer, philosopher and feminist, spent the first five years of her life growing up in the forest.

In the 19th century, the poet and humorist Thomas Hood published The Epping Hunt in 1829, about the rowdy annual Easter Monday deer hunt for Londoners which started at Buckhurst Hill. In 1832, Hood and his wife moved to the Lake House in Wanstead Park, which was later incorporated into the forest, and his 1838 novel Tylny Hall is set there. Charles Dickens' novel Barnaby Rudge begins with a description of the forest in 1775. Alfred, Lord Tennyson lived at Beech Hill House, High Beach, from 1837 to 1840, where he wrote parts of In Memoriam A.H.H.. Suffering from depression, he stayed as a guest at Dr. Martin Allen's asylum, where he would have encountered poet John Clare, whose behaviour became so erratic that he was removed to the asylum in 1837. William Morris, artist, writer and socialist, was born in Walthamstow in 1834, and spent his early years in what was then rural Essex, close to the outlying sections of the forest. Arthur Morrison, "the English Zola", lived successively at Chingford, Loughton, and High Beach in the forest, and – particularly in To London Town – the forest is used as a contrast to the East London deprivation he wrote about. Horace Newte, his contemporary and friend, lived at Loughton and Theydon Bois. Rudyard Kipling and Stanley Baldwin spent a seminal long holiday as boys in Loughton adjacent to the Forest, which they loved. This has been documented in detail by Janice Lingley in her Loughton Idyll (Alderton Press 2020).

The poet Edward Thomas was posted to a temporary army camp at High Beach when he enlisted in the Artists' Rifles in 1915. Although the conditions in the camp were squalid, Thomas enjoyed the forest and the following year moved with his wife to a cottage at Paul's Nursery, close to High Beach. One of his last poems, Out in the dark, was written at High Beach at Christmas 1916, shortly before he was killed in France.

During the 20th century, several writers used the forest as a setting for their novels, including R. Austin Freeman's The Jacob Street Mystery (1940), partly set at Loughton Camp. Dorothy L. Sayers' 1928 mystery Unnatural Death includes the discovery, in Epping Forest, of the body of a young woman possessing knowledge that could incriminate a murderer. The horror writer James Herbert used Epping Forest as the setting for his novel Lair (1979). In the book, a horde of Giant Black Rats establish a colony in the forest and embark on a murderous campaign against humans. Herbert mentions a now obscure legend attached to the forest – the legend of the white stag. Supposedly, the sighting of this animal is an omen of trouble and death. Natural historian and author Fred J Speakman lived at the Epping Forest Field Studies Centre, High Beach. He wrote several books about the area, including A Poacher's Tale with Alfred T Curtis, a Waltham Abbey-born poacher, and A Keeper's Tale, describing the life of forest keeper Sidney Butt.

T. E. Lawrence owned an estate at Pole Hill, Chingford; this was added to the Forest in 1929 and Lawrence's hut re-erected in the Forest Headquarters at the Warren, Loughton, where it remains, largely forgotten, today.

Actor and playwright Ken Campbell (1941–2008) lived in Loughton, adjacent to Epping Forest; his funeral took the form of a woodland burial in the forest.

=== Music ===
The song "The White Buck of Epping" by Sydney Carter (1957) refers to a sighting of (and subsequent hunt for) a white buck in the forest.

A track on Genesis' 1973 album Selling England by the Pound is entitled "The Battle of Epping Forest", and refers to a real-life East End gang-fight.

The interior of the gatefold sleeve of the progressive rock band Emerson, Lake & Palmer's third studio album Trilogy features a photomontage showing multiple images of the band in the forest carpeted with autumn leaves.

The Wings album London Town includes the song "Famous Groupies" (written by Paul McCartney) with the lyrics, "There was a lead guitarist / Who lived in Epping Forest / And all he ever wanted was to blow".

Damon Albarn's song "Hollow Ponds" (2014) is based on his memories of locals swimming at Hollow Ponds in Epping Forest in the heat wave of 1976, and other childhood memories of the area.

=== Television ===
The forest featured heavily in an episode of Living TV's Most Haunted Live over New Year 2003/2004 as the team, made up of Yvette Fielding and Derek Acorah, investigated the forest in the hope of discovering the spirit of Dick Turpin. The team got lost in the forest live on air, and a ranger was required to find them.

In the British BBC soap opera screened in February 1999, EastEnders, fictional character Steve Owen (Martin Kemp) accidentally killed his stalker Saskia Duncan (Deborah-Sheridin Taylor). He later panicked and buried her body in the forest. It was discovered 10 months later.

An episode of the BBC series New Tricks which was set in the forest was broadcast on 3 September 2013.

In the episode "Day Trippers" of the Thames Television sitcom Robin's Nest, first broadcast on 27 November 1978, the main characters picnic in the forest.

The forest was featured in the BBC programme Countryfile broadcast on 21 June 2020 presented by Anita Rani.

=== Cinema ===
As of 2013, Epping Forest has been used as a location in fourteen films including the Black Knight sequence in the 1975 film Monty Python and the Holy Grail.

== Crime ==
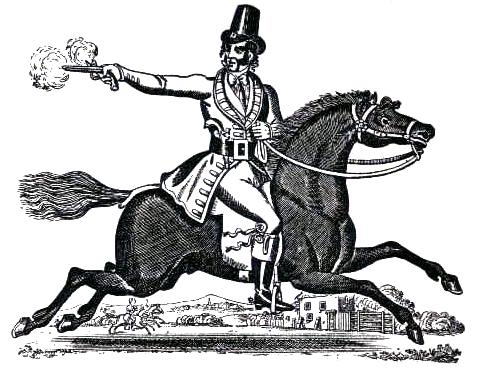
Dick Turpin is alleged to have had a hideout in the forest

The forest has long standing criminal associations. In the 18th century, Epping Forest became notorious as the haunt of highwaymen, who preyed on the coaches of wealthy racegoers on the road from London to Newmarket. Dick Turpin and Tom King used the forest as a hideaway, and Jack Rann, known as "Sixteen String Jack", had a pub named after him in Theydon Bois. Turpin had a hideout there. The tree cover and the forest's location close to London have made it notorious as a burial area for murder victims. Triple policeman murderer Harry Roberts hid out in the forest for a short time before his arrest in 1966.

=== Murders ===
- 1966 – Marian Hartley, a 15-year-old schoolgirl, was killed by Joseph Kiely, 20. Kiely dragged Hartley into the forest late at night, in the Chingford area, where he sexually assaulted her and strangled her, after she had been to a school dance.
- 1970 – The bodies of Susan Blatchford (eleven years old) and Gary Hanlon (twelve years old) were discovered in a copse on Lippitts Hill, after they went missing from their homes in Enfield, north London, in March 1970. The case was to be known as the 'Babes in the Wood' murders. Thirty years later, Ronald Jebson, already serving a life sentence for the 1974 murder of eight-year-old Rosemary Papper, confessed to the murders.
- 1981 – The thin decomposed 6 ft body of a white European man aged 30–40 was found in the undergrowth in the forest. He had a money belt containing English and Spanish money and wore a watch, costing approximately £40. The body remains unidentified.
- 1989 – Terence Gooderham, an accountant, and his girlfriend, Maxine Arnold, were both killed in a hit-man-style slaying whereby they were both shot with a double-barrelled shotgun. Although unsolved, it has been reported in the press that James Moody, described as "Britain's most notorious hitman", may have been responsible for the killings, although he was also murdered a few years later. It has been further suggested in the press that Gooderham was targeted because he creamed off £250,000 in drugs money that he was involved in laundering and that the hit was ordered by the Adams Family criminal organisation, which is also known as the Clerkenwell crime syndicate.
- 1990 – Patricia Parsons, who ran a massage parlour, was found dead in her car having been shot in the head with a cross-bow. It was suggested that she had a 'black book' of clients and was subject to a contract killing following the possibility that she was going to sell details to a newspaper. The murder remains unsolved.
- 2000 – Wendy Woodhouse, 31, was taken to forest in Essex, stripped, tortured and beaten to death with a snooker cue by two men who thought she had cheated them in a drugs deal. Courtney Peters, 28, an illegal immigrant from Jamaica, and Ewing Thomas, 25, of Stoke Newington, north London, were jailed for life for her murder at the Old Bailey.
- 2004 – The remains of Ivor Willis, who had been missing for two years, were found on Wanstead Flats.
- 2003 – The body of a person aged 40 years or more was found in the forest. Experts could not identify the person's sex as the body was believed to have been there for up to 20 years. The body remains unidentified.
- 2005 – Shah Afruj Ali, 40, was lured to the forest and stabbed, before his body was burnt by his younger lover Joygun Nessa, 27, and her brother Azhor Khan, 18, in 2005.
- 2005 – Rafal Czapczyk was found, after passers-by heard gunshots, with ballistic wounds to his head at Wake Arms. He died later in hospital. The body remained unidentified for several months until his family in Poland recognised mortuary pictures that had been released by police. It is not believed that his killers have been found.
- 2015 – Scotland Yard launched a murder inquiry after the body of Hidir Aksakal was found close to Hollow Ponds, Leytonstone, on 9 September 2015.

== See also ==
- Edward Buxton, who played a part in saving the forest for public use
- Epping Forest Keepers, responsible for the management and care of the forest
- Fred J Speakman, naturalist and author
- List of Sites of Special Scientific Interest in Greater London
- List of Sites of Special Scientific Interest in Essex
- Metropolitan Police Air Support Unit, is based in the forest at Lippits Hill
- Stephen Pewsey, historian
- Verderers of Epping Forest

== Sources ==
=== Books ===
- Addison, William (1945). Epping Forest: Its Literary and Historical Associations. London: J.M. Dent & Sons. Ltd.
- Buckley, G. B. (1935). Fresh Light on 18th Century Cricket. Cotterell.
- Buxton, Edward North (1885). Epping Forest. London: Edward Stanford.
- Chapman, Donald; Chapman, Norma (1975). Fallow Deer: Their history, distribution and biology. Lavenham, Suffolk: Terence Dalton Limited. ISBN 978-0900963506.
- Hagger, Nicholas (2012). A View of Epping Forest. O Books. ISBN 978-1846945878.
- Ramsey, Winston G, ed. (1986). Epping Forest then and now: An anthology. Battle of Britain Prints International. ISBN 978-0900913396.
- Qvist, Alfred (1971). Epping Forest. Corporation of London. ISBN 978-0852030042.
- Walford, Edward (1898). Greater London: a narrative of its history, its people, and its places. Volume I. London: Cassell & Company Limited.

=== Articles ===
- Layton, A. B. (1985). "Recreation, Management and Landscape in Epping Forest: c.1800-1984" (PDF). Field Studies (6): 269–290.
