= Forest of Essex =

Royal forest

Coordinates: 51.7°N 0.4°E

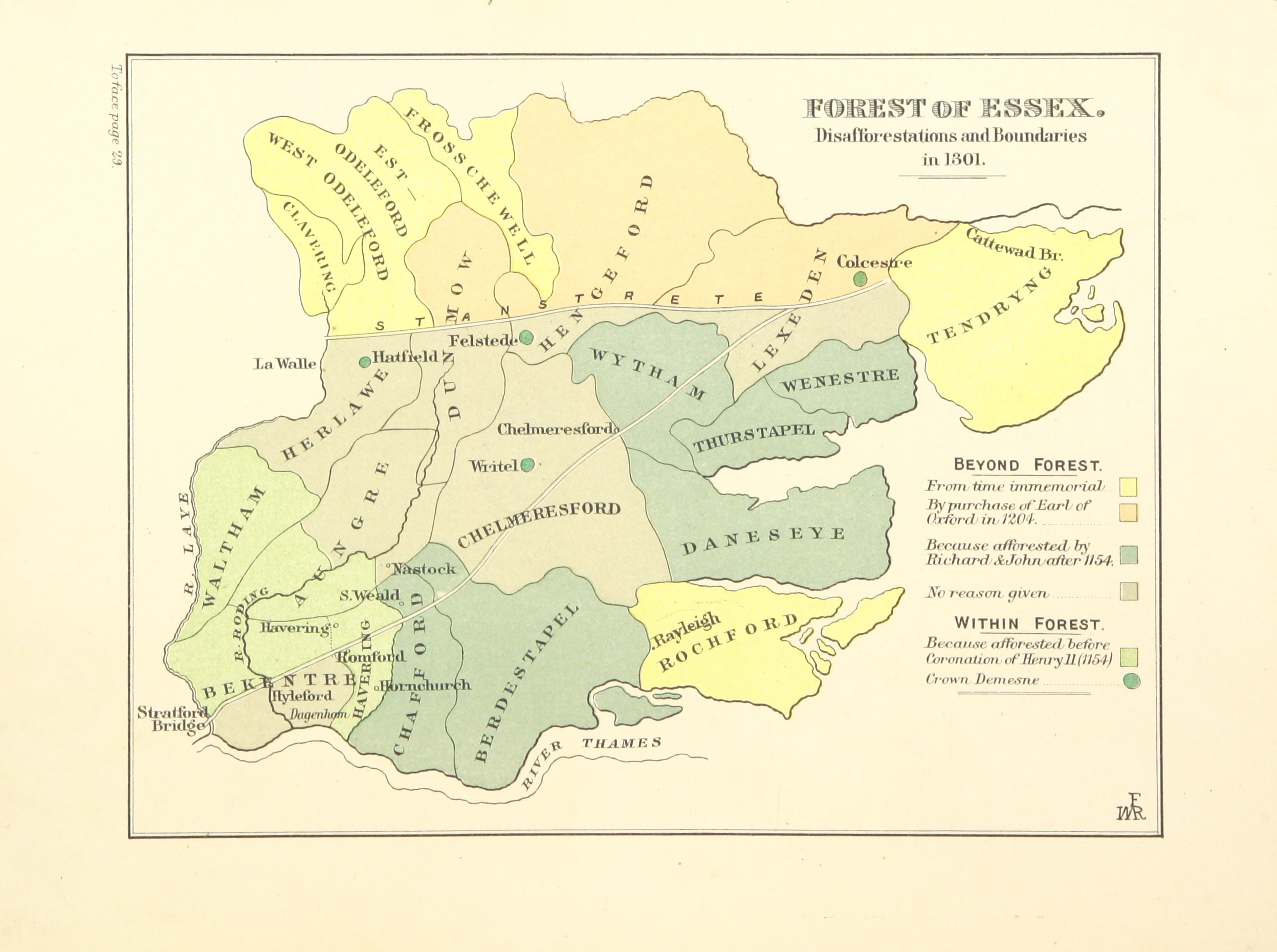
Map of disafforestations and boundaries in 1301

The Forest of Essex was a royal forest that existed from around 1100 and was disestablished in the 13th century.

Forests were legal institutions introduced by the Normans to denote an area where the King or another magnate had the right to keep and hunt deer and make Forest Law. Initially there was a very weak correlation between the extent of the legal forest and what might be termed the 'physical forest', the often wooded common land areas where the deer lived. In later centuries there was a much stronger correlation, so much so that the word forest is now taken to mean the same as woodland.

The Forest of Essex covered nearly all of Essex most of which was unwooded. The naturalist Oliver Rackham carried out an analysis of Domesday returns for Essex and was able to estimate the county was 20% wooded in 1086. The area covered by Forest Law excluded the least wooded areas of the county along the Thames and North Sea coasts so the percentage for the Forest of Essex was a little higher.

Over time parts of the country were disafforested, removed from Forest Law. In 1204 the men of Essex paid the King 500 marks and five palfreys for the 'forest of Essex which is beyond the Causeway between Colchester and Bishop's Stortford to be disafforested. In 1327 Edward III confirmed the Charter of the Forest (originally granted by Edward I in 1304) removing most of the rest of the rest of the County from Forest Law, ending the Forest of Essex. Forest Law now applied only to royal manors and the heavily wooded areas in the south-west Essex.

This disestablishment of the Forest of Essex led to the creation of four new smaller Forests which concentrated on areas with a greater proportion of woodland cover, namely: Waltham Forest (which included the physical forest areas subsequently known as Epping Forest, Wintry Forest (north of Epping) and Hainault Forest), Hatfield Forest, Writtle Forest and the long lost Kingswood Forest near Colchester. Hatfield and Writtle were royal manors while Kingswood was attached to the borough of Colchester, but the king owned the trees and grazing there.
