= Epping Forest Act 1878 =

Act of the UK Parliament

- Act of Parliament
- Parliament of the United Kingdom
- Long title: An Act for the Disafforestation of Epping Forest and the preservation and management of the uninclosed parts thereof as an Open Space for the recreation and enjoyment of the public; and for other purposes.
- Citation: 41 & 42 Vict. c. ccxiii

Dates
- Royal assent: 8 August 1878

Other legislation
- Amended by: Epping Forest Act 1880

Text of statute as originally enacted

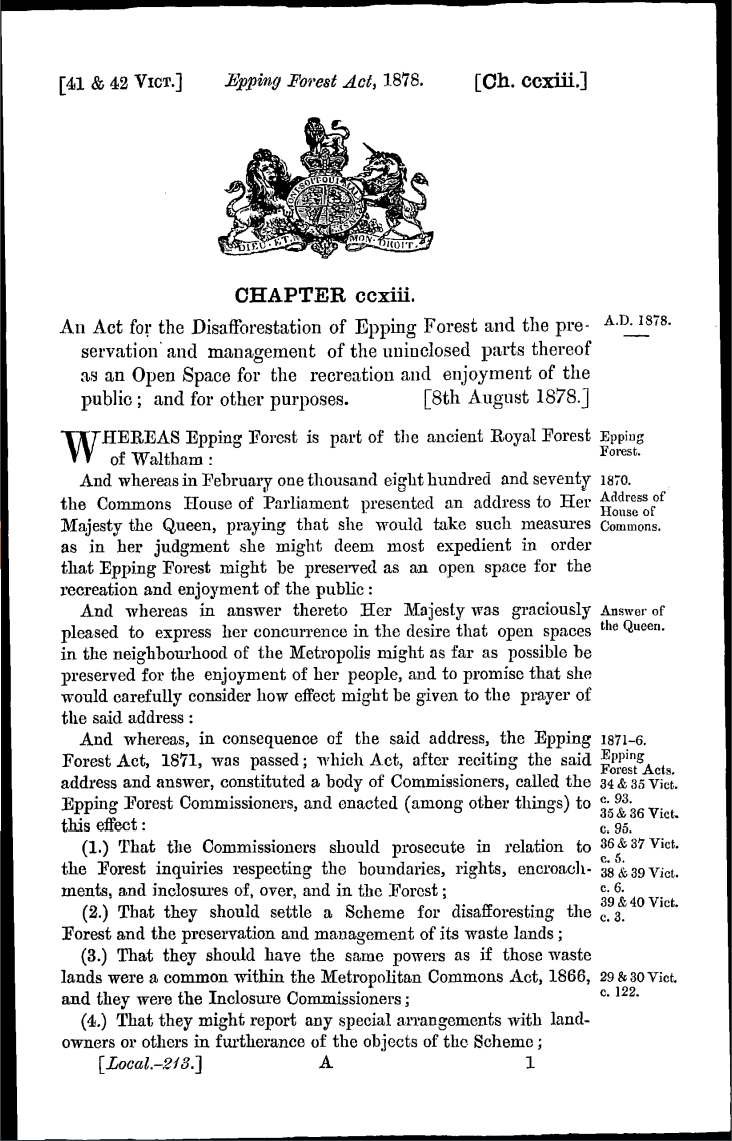
The first page of the Epping Forest Act 1878

During the middle of the nineteenth century, a number of initiatives were started to protect the rights of the public to use open spaces and for the areas to be conserved for their specific environmental features. Some notable people of the time devoted themselves to societies such as the Commons Preservation Society, now known as the Open Spaces Society, in order to gain protection for some clearly defined areas . One of these areas was Epping Forest on the outskirts of London. It was an area beginning to suffer encroachments of building development and enclosure. The local people of Loughton were also, by tradition, taking a limited quantity of wood from the forest under what was termed their 'lopping rights'. The enclosure of the lands within the forest bounds was threatening the performance of the annual lopping tradition and thus, a dispute also arose over the removal by private individuals of forest considered to be in public ownership. Following the intervention of a number of bodies and interested parties, some acts of Parliament were enacted gradually bringing about the desired protections. The Epping Forest Act 1878 (41 & 42 Vict. c. ccxiii) brought together the diverse rules and prescribed how the Forest was to be protected. The act formally records the Crown renouncing rights over the land and the Corporation of London, having bought acres of unenclosed Epping Forest land, named as the official conservators.

== Purpose ==
A local act of the United Kingdom Parliament for the disafforestation of Epping Forest and the preservation and management of unenclosed parts thereof as an open space for the recreation and enjoyment of the public. The management of the forest became, via the act, the Corporation of London. The act removed the rights of Loughton householders to lop wood within the forest for which, in substitution, a public hall was constructed in the town. The hall was named The Lopping Hall. The Lopping Hall is maintained, and its business carried on, by the charity organization called The Lopping Endowment, a UK registered charity number 228236. Constables with special powers granted under section 43 of the act are known as Forest Keepers in order to ensure the proper protection of the forest.
