= River Lee Country Park =

Protected area in Hertfordshire, England

Coordinates: 51.701°N 0.012°W

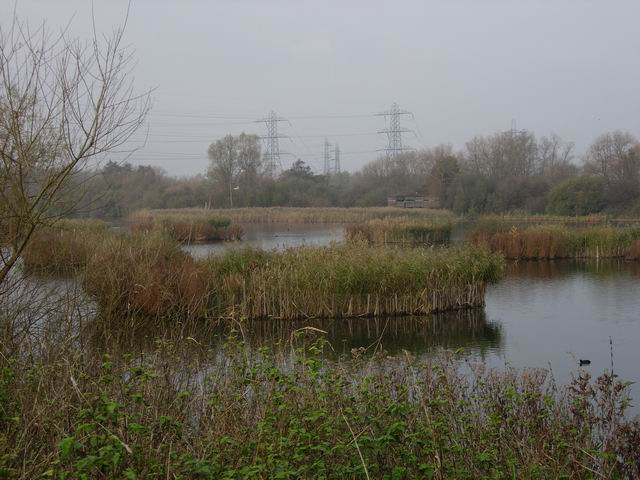
The bittern watchpoint in the background of the Seventy Acres lake Fishers Green

The River Lee Country Park is located in the Lee Valley Park and is managed by the Lee Valley Regional Park Authority. Covering 1,000 acres (400 ha) on either side of the River Lee Navigation between Waltham Abbey and Broxbourne, it is an area of lakes, watercourses, open spaces and three Sites of Special Scientific Interest (SSSI) linked by footpaths and cycle tracks.

The site straddles the Hertfordshire/Essex boundary.

== History ==
Since the 1930s the area which was originally part of the River Lea flood plain has been the centre of the sand and gravel industry, as a result there are many mature gravel pits. Some of the lakes were used for land fill purposes. In a joint effort by the St Albans Sand and Gravel Co Ltd and the Lee Valley Regional Park Authority the area has been transformed, with much of the park a Site of Special Scientific Interest (SSSI).

== Olympics 2012 ==
The park at the Showground site, Highbridge Street A121, Waltham Cross was the chosen venue for the 2012 Olympics canoeing events. The site is now known as the Lee Valley White Water Centre.

== Watercourses ==
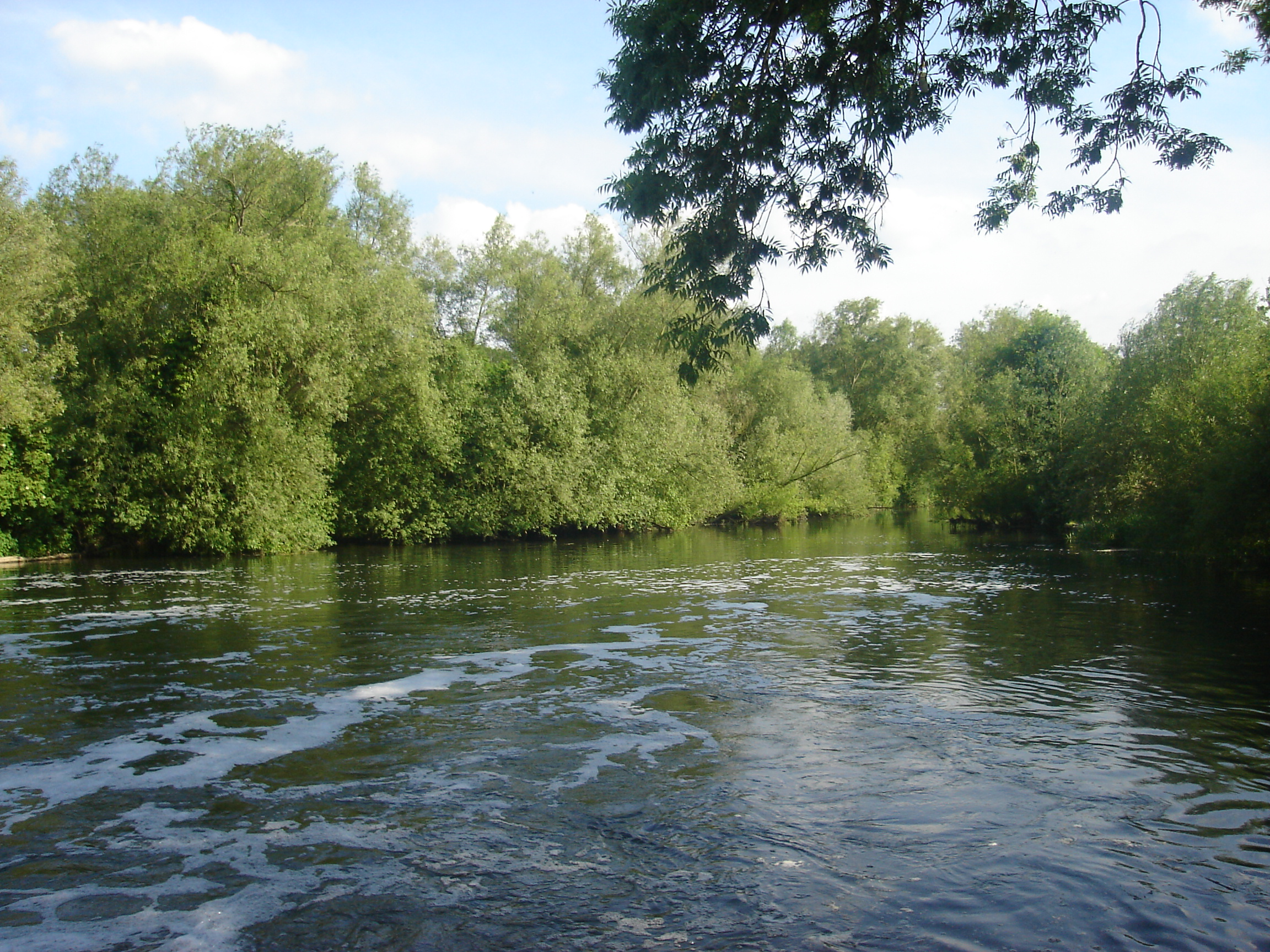
The River Lea at Kings Weir

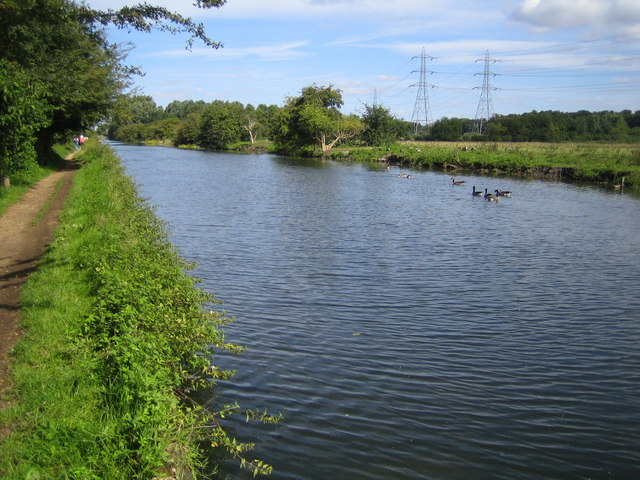
The River Lee Navigation above Waltham Cross

- Cornmill Stream, flows from the Lea at Fishers Green to rejoin the Lea at Waltham Abbey.
- Millhead Stream, flows through the former Royal Gunpowder Mills at Waltham Abbey.
- River Lea
- River Lee Flood Relief Channel, the Channel incorporates the former Horsemill Stream close to Waltham Abbey.
- River Lee Navigation
- Small River Lea

== Lakes ==
The following are some of the larger waters that can be visited in the park. Some of them form the Turnford and Cheshunt Pits SSSI.

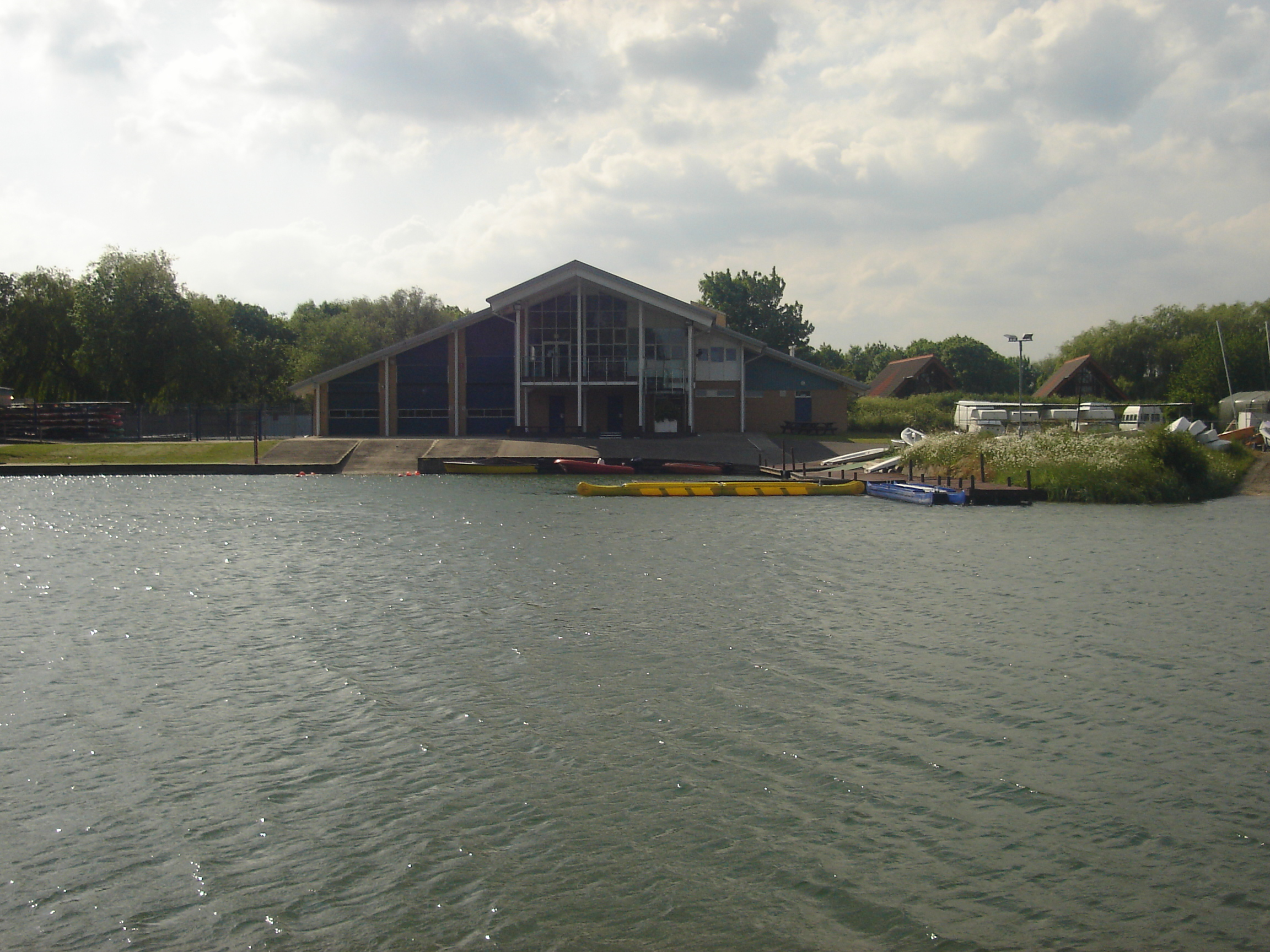
The Herts Young Mariners at Cheshunt Lake

- Bowyers Water. Believed to be hand dug in the 1920s, and one of the oldest lakes in the Lee Valley.TL3664401519
- Cheshunt Lake. Home of the Herts Young Mariners. TL3682002633
- Friday Lake A carp fishery. TL3699002004
- Hall Marsh Scrape. The lake was specifically constructed for the use by wildfowl. TL3710701742
- Holyfield Lake. The 180 acres (73 ha) lake incorporates part of the River Lee Flood Relief Channel. TL3736604898
- Hooks Marsh Lake The over- wintering bittern can be found here between December and March. TL3717502523
- North Metropolitan. Better known as North Met Pit. Due to the many islands and inlets, the lake has an estimated shoreline of 4 miles (6.4 km). TL3679403257
- Seventy Acres Lake. The bittern and the otter can be seen here. TL3742203097
- Turnford Pits.TL3701204955 Small relics of unimproved grassland that preceded gravel extraction can be found adjacent to the lakes.

== Sites of Special Scientific Interest (SSSI) ==
The park contains three SSSIs;

- Cornmill Stream and Old River Lea
- Turnford and Cheshunt Pits
- Waltham Abbey SSSI
