= Millhead Stream =

River in Essex, England

Coordinates: 51.6896°N 0.0091°W

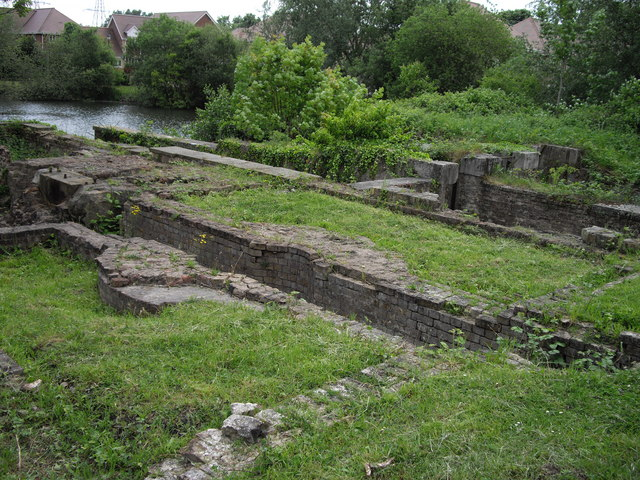
Foundations of 19th century water mills on the Millhead Stream

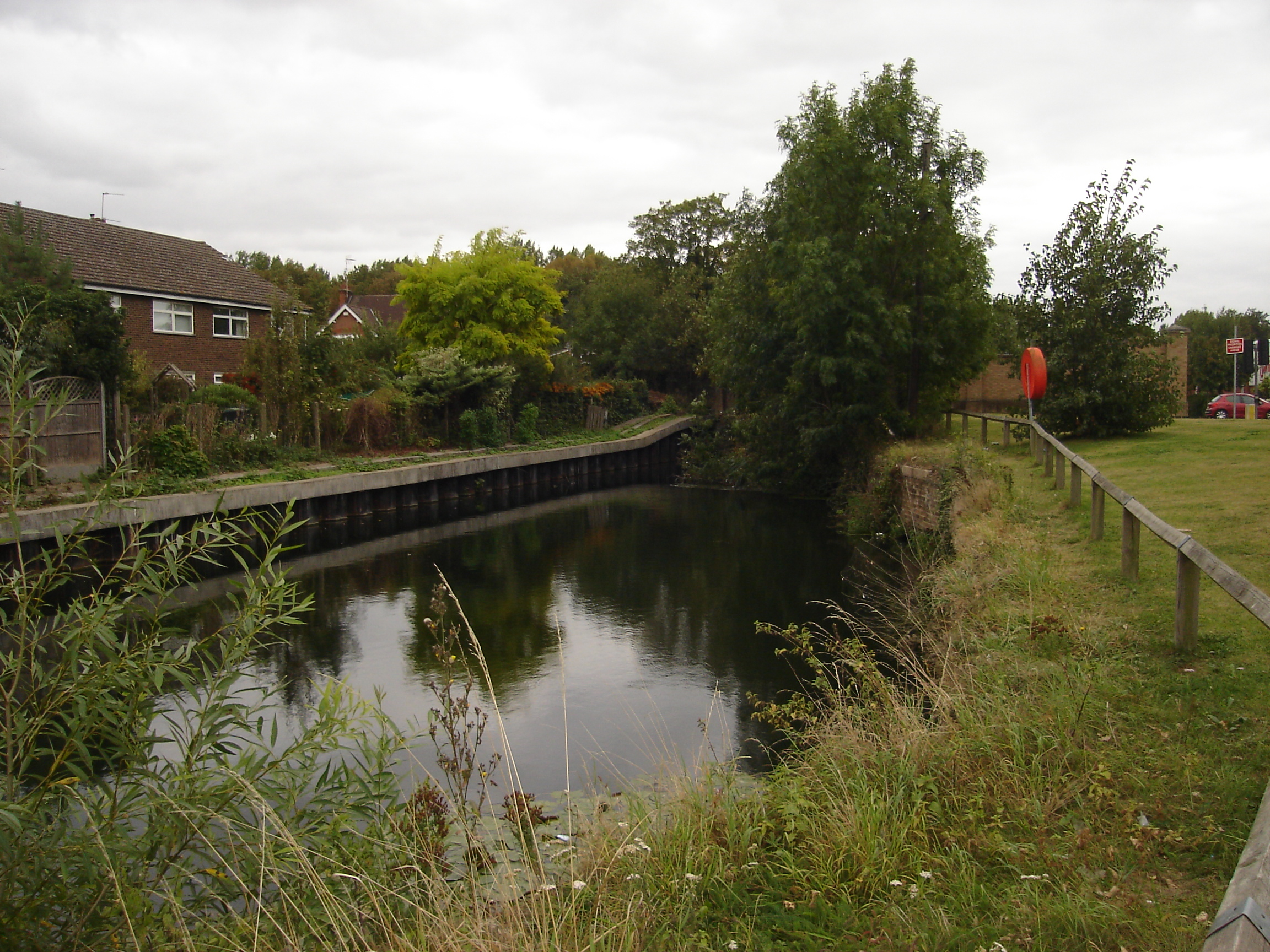
The Millhead Stream at Beaulieu Drive

The Millhead Stream is a minor tributary of the River Lea in England. The stream flows north to south across the Waltham Abbey flood plain and through the site of the former Royal Gunpowder Mills.

== History ==
The stream is an engineered watercourse which is part of an intricate five mile canal system within the Gunpowder Mills establishment and is fed by water from the River Lea. It provided the main power source for water driven mills in the area before the first gunpowder mills were recorded in 1662. The stream was also used for the smooth and safe delivery of raw materials and collection of gunpowder.

Due to its location the stream remained largely unseen for over 300 years until the site was opened to the general public in 2001.

== Course ==
The stream leaves the Cornmill Stream to flow through the Waltham Abbey Site of Special Scientific Interest within the Royal Gunpowder Mills site, before flowing through late 20th century housing developments. After passing under the B194 road at Highbridge Street the stream merges with the River Lea to flow under the A121 to join the River Lee Flood Relief Channel below the town of Waltham Abbey.

== Public access ==
The stream can be seen at Beaulieu Drive close to the entrance of the Gunpowder Mills site. Within the site, where the stream passes through the SSSI access is restricted and can be visited by land train only.
