= Waltham Abbey (disambiguation) =

Waltham Abbey is a town in Essex, England.

Waltham Abbey may also refer to the following things in Essex, England:

- Waltham Abbey Church, the abbey which gave its name to the above town
- Waltham Abbey Royal Gunpowder Mills
- Waltham Abbey F.C., based in the same town
