= A121 =

A121 may refer to:

- A121 road (England), a road connecting Waltham Cross and Woodford
- A121 road (Malaysia), a road in Perak connecting the Slim River and Behrang Ulu
