= Cobbins Brook =

River in Essex, England

Coordinates: 51.6797°N 0.0101°W

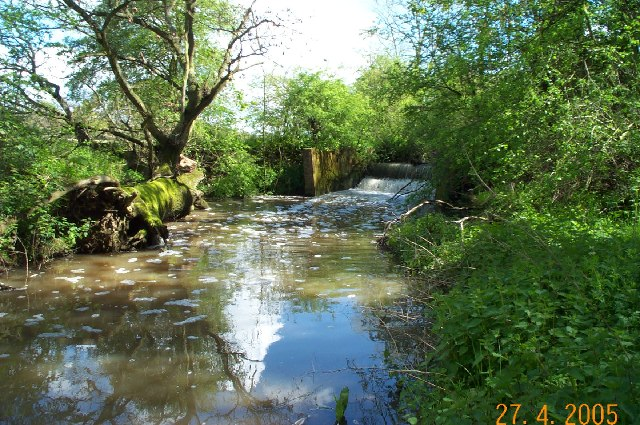
Weir on Cobbins Brook at Warlies Park, Upshire.

Cobbins Brook is a minor tributary of the River Lea. It forms to the north of Epping, Essex and flows past Epping Upland, Waltham Abbey until it joins the River Lee Flood Relief Channel below the M25 near Rammey Marsh.

Course of Cobbins Brook

== Queen Boudica ==
A local legend claims Boudica's rebellion against the Romans ended in the Waltham Abbey neighbourhood when she poisoned herself with hemlock gathered from the banks of Cobbins Brook.
