= Turnford and Cheshunt Pits =

Protected area in Hertfordshire and Essex, England

Coordinates: 51.7090°N 0.0162°W

- Site of Special Scientific Interest
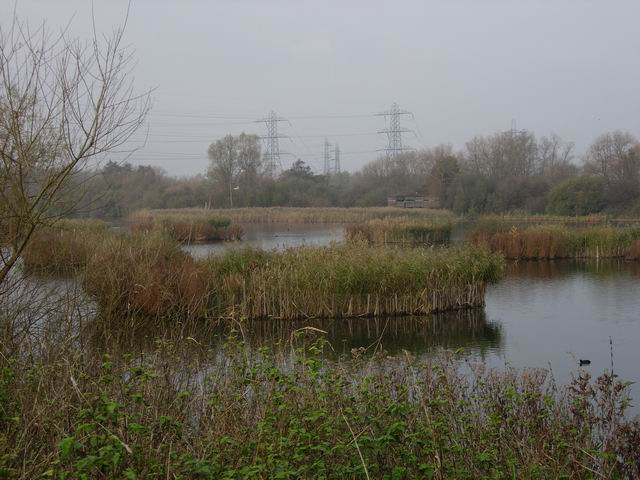
- The great bittern watchpoint, Seventy Acres Lake, Fishers Green
- Location of Turnford and Cheshunt Pits.
- Area of search: Hertfordshire; Essex
- Grid reference: TL370030
- Interest: Biological
- Area: 173.3 ha (428 acres)
- Notification date: 1995
- Location map: Magic Map

The Turnford and Cheshunt Pits is a biological Site of Special Scientific Interest near Cheshunt in Hertfordshire and Essex and covers a total of 428.17 acres (173.28 ha). It is part of the Lee Valley Special Protection Area.

== Location ==
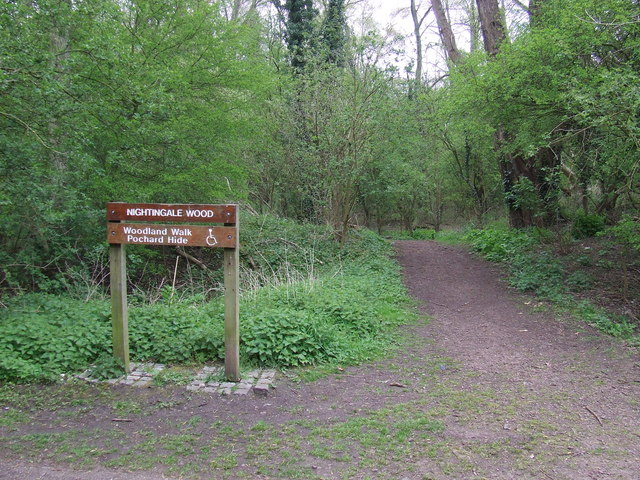
Nightingale Wood

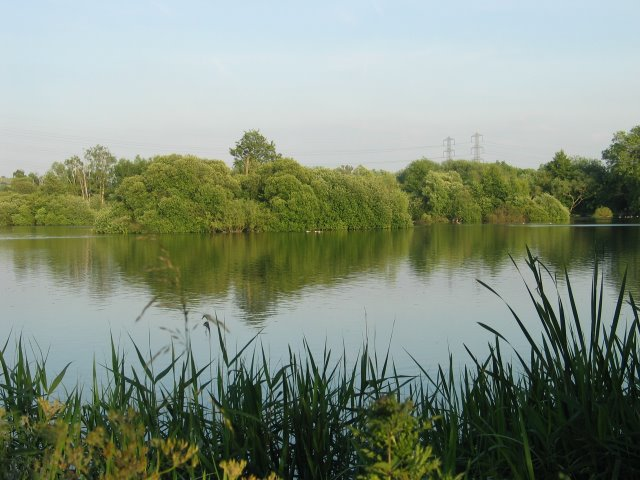
North Metropolitan Pit

Most of the site is owned by Lee Valley Regional Park Authority and managed as the River Lee Country Park. The site is bounded to the west by Cheshunt and Turnford and Fishers Green and Holyfield to the east.

== Description ==
The SSSI includes ten former gravel pits, part of the Small River Lea, a further waterbody, Hall Marsh Scrape, which was constructed specifically for use by waterfowl. Also included in the site are areas of marsh, grassland, ruderal herbs, scrubland and woodland.

The pits which include North Metropolitan Pit known as Northmetpit was excavated in the 1940s to Hooks Marsh Lake which was dug in the 1970s and cover a span of over 40 years.

The site are of national importance for the wintering gadwall and the wintering northern shoveler and of regional importance for wintering coot and locally important for wintering snipe and the bittern. Breeding bird species of local importance include the great crested grebe, tufted duck, coot, little ringed plover, sedge warbler and the reed warbler.

Many species of aquatic invertebrates have been recorded from the site especially damselflies and dragonflies including the scarce hairy dragonfly which has bred on the site and the red eyed damselfly is found in abundance.

The various pits support varied aquatic and marinal flora including the nationally scarce whorled water milfoil. Other species include the fan-leaved water-crowfoot, flowering rush, lesser reedmace, frogbit, blunt-leaved pondweed, lesser pondweed and the brown sedge.

Many of the spits and islands have developed into areas of scrubland and woodland mostly of willow species and alder. To the west of the North Metropolitan pit is the Nightingale Wood. This large block of woodland provides roosting and feeding sites for wintering and migratory passerine birds. The nationally scarce musk beetle aromia moschata is also present in these areas.

Several pits have developed marsh and rank grassland, their principal value is for invertebrates, particularly an area close to Bowyer's Water where grasshoppers and bush-crickets are present. This orthopteran fauna is believed to be the richest in Hertfordshire and includes several species more associated with coastal sites, such as the lesser marsh grasshopper and the nationally scarce roesel's bush-cricket.

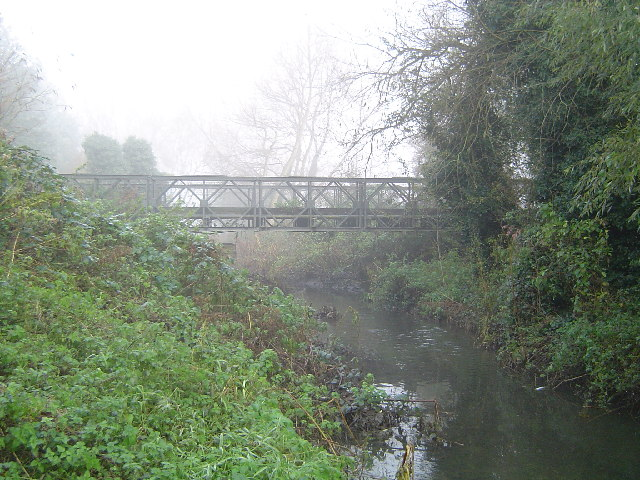
Small River Lea

Several areas of former gravel pit have been infilled with power station pulverised fuel ash, much of which was transported to the site by barge via the River Lee Navigation. Much of the reclaimed land is poorly drained and exerts a strong calcareous influence on the vegetation. The area supports some of the largest colonies of marsh orchid in Essex and Hertfordshire. Other orchids present in large numbers are the early marsh orchid and southern marsh orchid, also present in smaller numbers are the common spotted orchid and various hybrids between these species.

To the north of the site at Turnford Pit North, are a number of small areas of grassland believed to represent relics of the habitat which preceded gravel extraction. These fragments of agriculturally unimproved grassland are of a dry, rather calcareous, type which is rarely found in a river valley. Plant species which are present here include the cowslip, wild carrot and the common centaury.

The site also supports a wide range of mammals, reptiles and amphibians: including otter, harvest mice and a large population of grass snake.

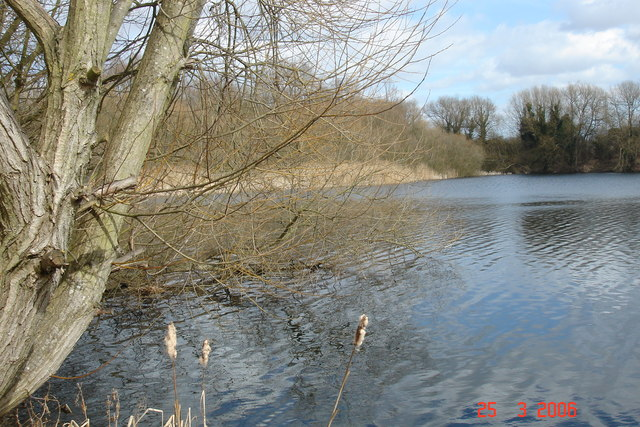
Turnford Pits

== Public access ==
The nearest station is Cheshunt railway station. Car parking is available adjacent to the site. Cycling and pedestrian access via the Lea Valley Walk. Much of the site can be visited by the network of public footpaths and cycle tracks.

== See also ==
- List of Sites of Special Scientific Interest in Essex
- List of Sites of Special Scientific Interest in Hertfordshire
