= William Henry Noble (British Army officer) =

Anglo-Irish army officer

Major-General William Henry Noble FRS
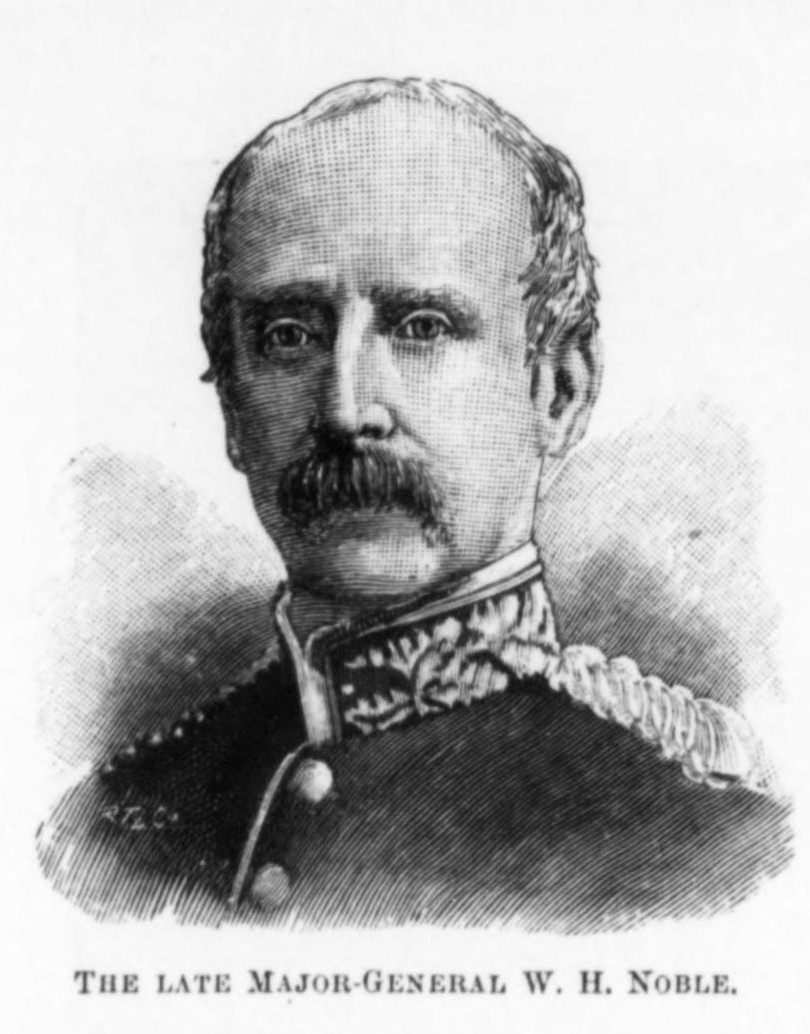
- Portrait from an obituary in The Illustrated London News, 28 May 1892
- Born: 14 October 1834; Laniskea, County Fermanagh
- Died: 17 May 1892 (aged 57); Waltham Abbey, Essex
- Alma mater: Trinity College, Dublin
- Spouse: Emily Marriott (m. 1861)
- Children: 6 (2 sons, 4 daughters)
- Military career
- Allegiance: United Kingdom
- Branch: British Army
- Service years: 1856–1892
- Rank: Major-General
- Unit: Royal Artillery
- Conflicts: Second Anglo-Afghan War

Major-General William Henry Noble, FRS (14 October 1834 – 17 May 1892) was a British Army officer.

== Life ==
William Henry Noble, eldest son of Robert Noble, Rector of Athboy, County Meath, and grandson of William Newcome, Archbishop of Armagh, was born at Laniskea, County Fermanagh, on 14 October 1834. He studied at Trinity College, Dublin, where in 1856 he graduated BA with honours in experimental science, and proceeded MA in 1859.

At the end of the Crimean War, just before taking his first degree, he passed for a direct commission in the Royal Artillery, in which he was appointed lieutenant on 6 March 1856. He became captain in 1866, major in 1875, lieutenant-colonel in 1882, and brevet colonel in 1886.

From 1861 to 1868 he served as an associate-member of the Ordnance Select Committee for carrying out ballistic and other experiments in scientific gunnery. He was then appointed to the staff of the Director-General of the Ordnance, and subsequently acted until 1876 as a member of the experimental branch of that department at Woolwich, serving as member or secretary of numerous artillery committees, on explosives, on range-finders, on iron armour and equipment, and other technologies.

In 1875 he received the rank of major, and returned to regimental duty. He was posted to a field battery, but immediately after was sent to the United States as one of the British judges of weapons at the Centennial Exhibition at Philadelphia. He was member and secretary of the group of judges of the war section, and by special permission of the commander-in-chief of the United States army visited all the arsenals, depôts, and manufacturing establishments of war material in that country.

In June 1877 he was sent to India as member and acting secretary of a special committee appointed by the Marquis of Salisbury to report on the reorganisation of the ordnance department of the Indian Army and its manufacturing establishments in the three presidencies. He was employed on this duty from February 1876 to November 1878, when, on the breaking out of the Afghan War, he was appointed staff officer of the field train of the Candahar Field Force. He organised the field train at Sukhur, and commanded it on its march through the Bolan Pass.

In 1880 he was posted to a field battery at Woolwich; in April 1881 became a member of the ordnance committee, and in July 1885 was appointed superintendent of Waltham Abbey Royal Gunpowder Factory. On reaching his fifty-fifth birthday in October 1889 he was retired under the age clause of the royal warrant with the rank of major-general, but as it was found that his experience and qualifications could not be spared, he was restored to the active list in 1890, and continued at Waltham. Very large quantities of prismatic gunpowder (E. X. E. and S. B. C.) were manufactured at Waltham Abbey or by private contract from his discoveries, which, by permission of the War Office, were protected by a patent granted to him in 1886. The manufacture of cordite is understood to have been largely due to Noble's researches.

=== Death ===
He died at Thrift Hall, Waltham Abbey, on 17 May 1892, aged 57. Noble married in 1861 Emily, daughter of Frederick Marriott, one of the originators of the Illustrated London News, by whom he had two sons and four daughters.

== Works ==
Noble, who was an FRS London, and a member of various other learned societies, was author of:

- Report of various Experiments carried out under the Direction of the Ordnance Select Committee relative to the Penetration of Iron Armour-plates by Steel Shot, with a Memorandum on the Penetration of Iron Ships by Steel and other Projectiles, London, 1886;
- Useful Tables (for Artillerymen). Computed by W. H. N., London, 1874;
- Descent of W. H. Noble from the Blood Royal of England, London, 1889.
