= Dean Wolstenholme Sr. =

English animal painter

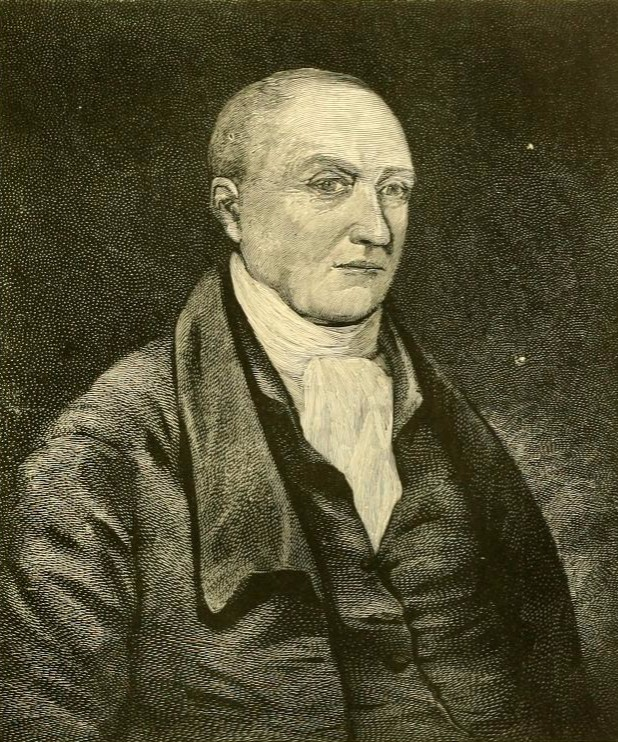
Dean Wolstenholme by Dean Wolstenholme jr. when a young man, engraved on wood by Frank Babbage

Dean Wolstenholme the elder (1757–1837) was an English animal painter.

== Life ==
Born in Yorkshire, he spent most of his early life in Essex and Hertfordshire. He lived at Cheshunt, at Turnford, and then at Waltham Abbey. His early life was sporting, and he was an amateur artist. In 1793 he became involved in litigation over property at Waltham, and after three unsuccessful chancery suits was left in financial difficulty. He then took up painting as a profession.

Around the year 1800, Wolstenholme went to London and settled in East Street, Red Lion Square. In 1803, he exhibited his initial picture, Coursing, at the Royal Academy. Annually to 1824 his animal pictures then appeared at the Academy.

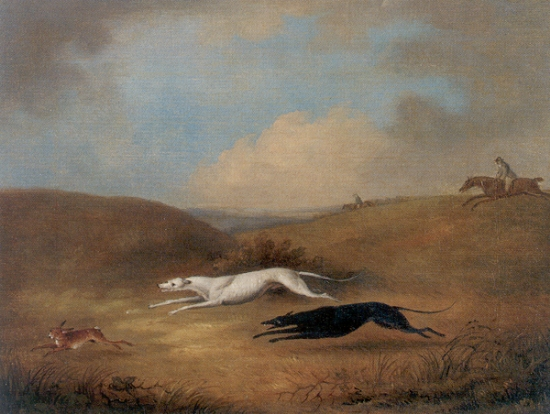
Greyhounds Coursing by Dean Wolstenholme the elder

After 1826 Wolstenholme painted little. He died in 1837 at the age of 80, and was buried in Old St. Pancras churchyard. The painter Dean Wolstenholme Jr. was his son.

== Notes ==
Attribution

This article incorporates text from a publication now in the public domain: Lee, Sidney, ed. (1900). "Wolstenholme, Dean (1757-1837)". Dictionary of National Biography. Vol. 62. London: Smith, Elder & Co.
