= Harriadnie Beau =

British fashion model

Harriadnie Beau Phipps
- Born: 3 May 1993 (age 33); Waltham Abbey, Essex, England
- Occupations: Fashion model; brand ambassador
- Modeling information
- Height: 5 ft 9 in (1.75 m)
- Website: harriadniebeau.com

Harriadnie Beau Phipps (born 3 May 1993) (pron: Harri-add-nee-bow, hɛri-æd-ni bo) is an English fashion model and brand ambassador. She appeared in numerous publications and media to promote various brands and products, including Vogue, Elle, Ok! Extra magazine, She took on the role of 'The Face' FaceOn magazine, HMH Couture, Pia Michi, Jensen Interceptor specialist Cropredy Bridge, UK Tights, celebrity club Sugar Hut, and worked for Anoosh. She was a celebrity columnist for FaceOn beauty magazine with 'The Harriadnie Beau Diaries a regular fashion and beauty column. In 2012, Harriadnie was a guest judge at Salon Prive car show alongside Jamiroquai's Jay K, Deborah Arthurs and Liz Brewer for Boodles Ladies Day. Beau was a judge in a fashion show. She turned down a role in the reality television series The Only Way Is Essex to focus upon her career in haute couture fashion. In 2012 she was appointed brand ambassador to the Tushek T500, Slovenia's only supercar. In 2014 Harriadnie Beau unveiled the classic car Jenson FF by Jensen Interceptor alongside CAR SOS presenter Fuzz Townshend. Harriadnie took part in Madeira Fashion Week 2018 taking the runway for Cristiano Ronaldo CR7 as one of his hand picked models. In 2018 she was crowned Miss Madeira, Film festival International whilst working for Ronaldo.
