= Terry Lawrence =

English cricketer

Personal information
- Full name: Terence Patrick Lawrence
- Born: 26 April 1910; Waltham Abbey, Essex, England
- Died: 7 January 1989 (aged 78); Fawley, Berkshire, England
- Batting: Right-handed
- Bowling: Leg break

Domestic team information
- Years: Team
- 1947: Berkshire
- 1933–1935: Essex
- 1929–1932: Hertfordshire

Career statistics
Competition	First-class
Matches	7
Runs scored	133
Batting average	9.50
100s/50s	–/–
Top score	39
Balls bowled	–
Wickets	–
Bowling average	–
5 wickets in innings	–
10 wickets in match	–
Best bowling	–
Catches/stumpings	3/–
- Source: Cricinfo, 24 January 2011

Terence Patrick Lawrence (26 April 1910 – 7 January 1989) was an English cricketer. Lawrence was a right-handed batsman who bowled leg break. He was born at Waltham Abbey, Essex.

Lawrence started his playing career with Hertfordshire, playing for the county in the Minor Counties Championship from 1929 to 1932, before joining Essex for the 1933 season. His first-class debut for the county came against the touring West Indians. Playing a further first-class fixture in 1933, Lawrence would have to wait to 1935 before representing Essex at the highest domestic level, a season in which he played 5 further first-class matches, the last coming against Somerset at the Vista Road Recreation Ground, Clacton-on-Sea. Somewhat of an inefficient batsman at the first-class level, Lawrence scored just 133 runs in his 7 matches at a batting average of 9.50 and a high score of 39. Following the Second World War, he played for Berkshire 6 times in the 1947 Minor Counties Championship.

He died at Fawley, Berkshire on 7 January 1989.
