= Lippitts Hill =

Coordinates: 51.6545°N 0.0177°E

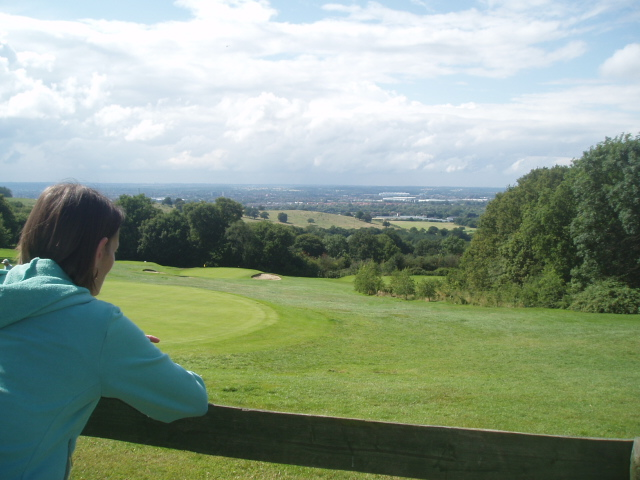
Lippitts Hill

Lippitts Hill is a hill in Epping Forest in High Beach, Waltham Abbey, Essex. It has played several historic roles in the defence and policing of London.

The hill was the site of a gun emplacement in the First World War and used as an anti-aircraft site in the Second World War. The United States's 184th anti-aircraft artillery installed their own guns in 1941, and added an underground control room and block houses to the site. A prisoner of war camp was established at Lippitts Hill by the British after the camp was abandoned by the Americans in 1944. Relics from the Second World War at the camp include a memorial to the American forces that served there, and a concrete sculpture of a man, left by a German prisoner of war, Rudi Webber. The local branch of the Peace Pledge Union, a pacifist organisation, would invite local prisoners of war from the camp to their homes on Christmas Day.

The hill was the location of the bodies in the Babes in the Wood murders in 1970.

== Police use ==
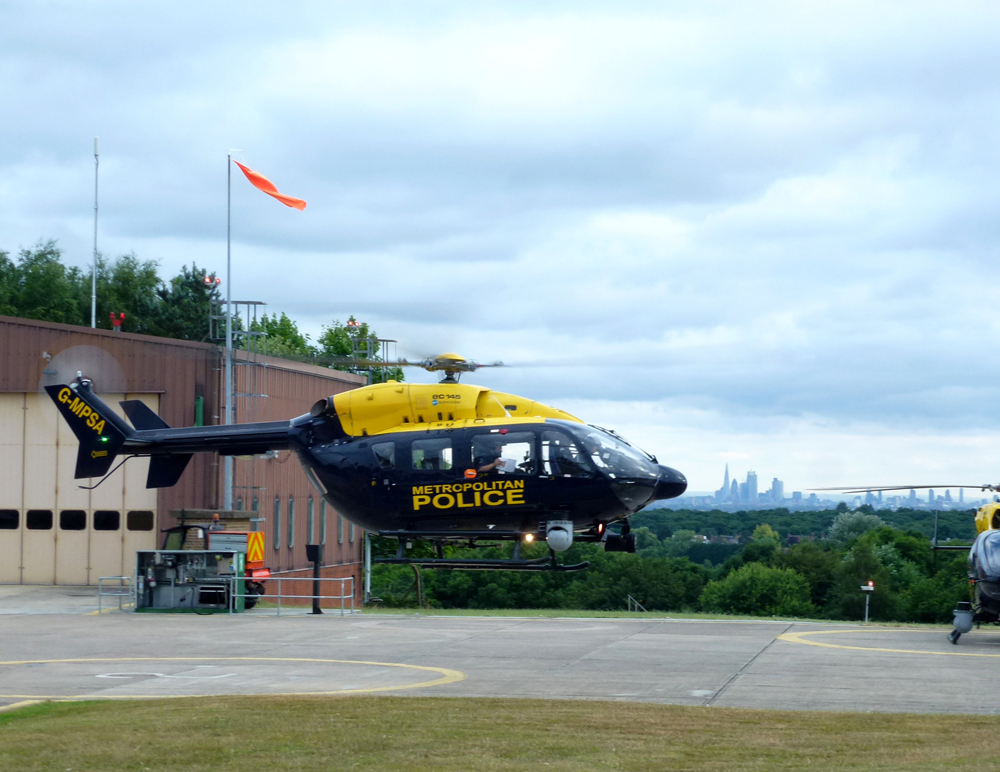
Police helicopter at Lippitts Hill

The Lippitts Hill camp was used for civil defence purposes after the war and by the police. The Metropolitan Police Firearms Training Unit was based at Lippitts Hill, and it was the site of the Metropolitan Police's first firearms training course. A new centre (MPSTC) is now operation at Gravesend.

Lippitts Hill was home to the Metropolitan Police Air Support Unit, which subsequently became part of the National Police Air Service, acting as a base for police helicopters operating in the London area. Helicopter operations were moved from Lippitts Hill to North Weald Airfield around late 2019, but at the end of 2021, the National Police Air Service moved back to Lippitts Hill.
