= Propellants, Explosives and Rocket Motor Establishment =

Propellants, Explosives and Rocket Motor Establishment, usually known for brevity as PERME, operated at two sites:

- Waltham Abbey Royal Gunpowder Mills, known from 1977 as PERME Waltham Abbey
- Rocket Propulsion Establishment established at RAF Westcott in 1946, also known as PERME Westcott
- RAF Spadeadam, also known as the Rocket Establishment, was not officially part of PERME but was often confused with it.
