= Thomas Reeve (divine) =

Thomas Reeve, D.D. (1594 – 21 February 1672), was an English royalist and Anglican divine.

== Life ==
Reeve was born at Langley with Hardley, Norfolk, England, in 1594. He was the son of Thomas Reeve, a husbandman, and received his education in a school kept by Mr. Matchet at Moulton, Norfolk. On 30 June 1610 he was admitted a sizar of Gonville and Caius College, Cambridge, where he graduated B.A. in 1613, M.A. in 1617, B.D. in 1624, and D.D. in 1660. After taking orders he was presented to the incumbency of Waltham Abbey, Essex, succeeding Thomas Fuller (1608–61), and he died there on 21 February 1671–2.

During his incumbency at Waltham Abbey, the Royal Arms of Charles II were put up in the church. They were commissioned in 1662 at a cost of £24, and are still on display. The date may reflect the passing of the Act of Uniformity 1662.

Reeve, who was greatly admired as a preacher, published a number of sermons and devotional works.

== Works ==
- Publike Devotions, or a Collection of Prayers, London, 1651, 12mo.
- God's Plea for Nineveh, or London's Precedent for Mercy, London, 1657, fol.; dedicated to Thomas Rich, citizen of London. An abridgment of this work appeared under the title of London's Remembrancer: a Call and Pattern for true and speedy Repentance, London, 1683, 4to.
- England's Restitution, or the Man, the Man of Men, the States-man, London, 1660 [no, 1661 - see EEBO record (not image), DNB, etc.], 4to; dedicated to Charles II.
- England's beauty in seeing King Charles the Second restored to majesty, London, 1661; dedicated to Charles II.
