= Royal Gunpowder Mills =

Royal Gunpowder Mills may refer to:

- Ballincollig Royal Gunpowder Mills
- Faversham, Kent explosive industry
- Waltham Abbey Royal Gunpowder Mills
