= Waltham Abbey SSSI =

Protected area in Essex, England

Coordinates: 51.6983°N 0.0094°W

- Site of Special Scientific Interest
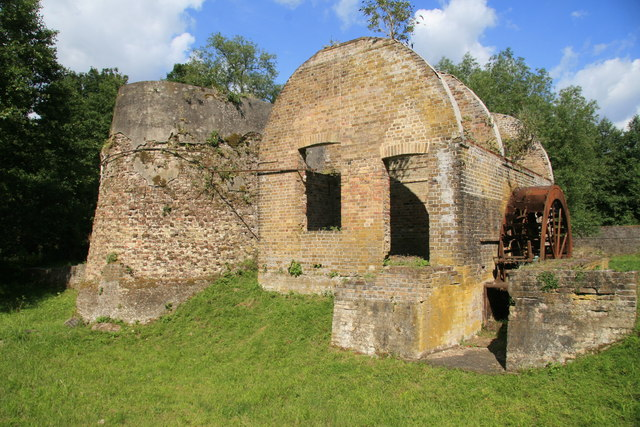
- Water-wheeled gunpowder press located on the site
- Location of Waltham Abbey SSSI.
- Area of search: Essex
- Grid reference: TL376020
- Interest: Biological
- Area: 84.5 (ac) 34.2 (ha)
- Notification date: 1986
- Location map: Magic map

Waltham Abbey SSSI is a 34.2-hectare (85-acre) biological Site of Special Scientific Interest which is located within the Waltham Abbey Royal Gunpowder Mills at Waltham Abbey in Essex.

== History ==
For 300 years the area was cut off from its surroundings by river boundaries and the highly secret nature of its work. The site was finally closed in 1991. Decontamination work was carried out between 1992–96 and the site opened to the public in 2001.

== Location ==
The woodland site lies to the north of the present day Gunpowder Mills and is bounded by the River Lee Flood Relief Channel to the north and west while the Cornmill Stream forms its eastern boundary.

== Description ==
The site is alder woodland on damp soils, with other trees including sycamore, ash and crack willow. The trees were planted around 1700 to provide charcoal for the manufacture of gunpowder, and planting ceased at the time of the First World War. The wood has the largest heronry in Essex, which was present in 1974 and had 26 pairs in 1984. Other birds include tawny owls, tree sparrows, reed warblers, sedge warblers and blackcaps.

== Access ==
Access is from Beaulieu Drive and there is a charge for entry.

== Public transport ==
Rail

- Waltham Cross railway station
