= Fishers Green =

Settlement in Essex

Coordinates: 51.705631°N 0.009613°W

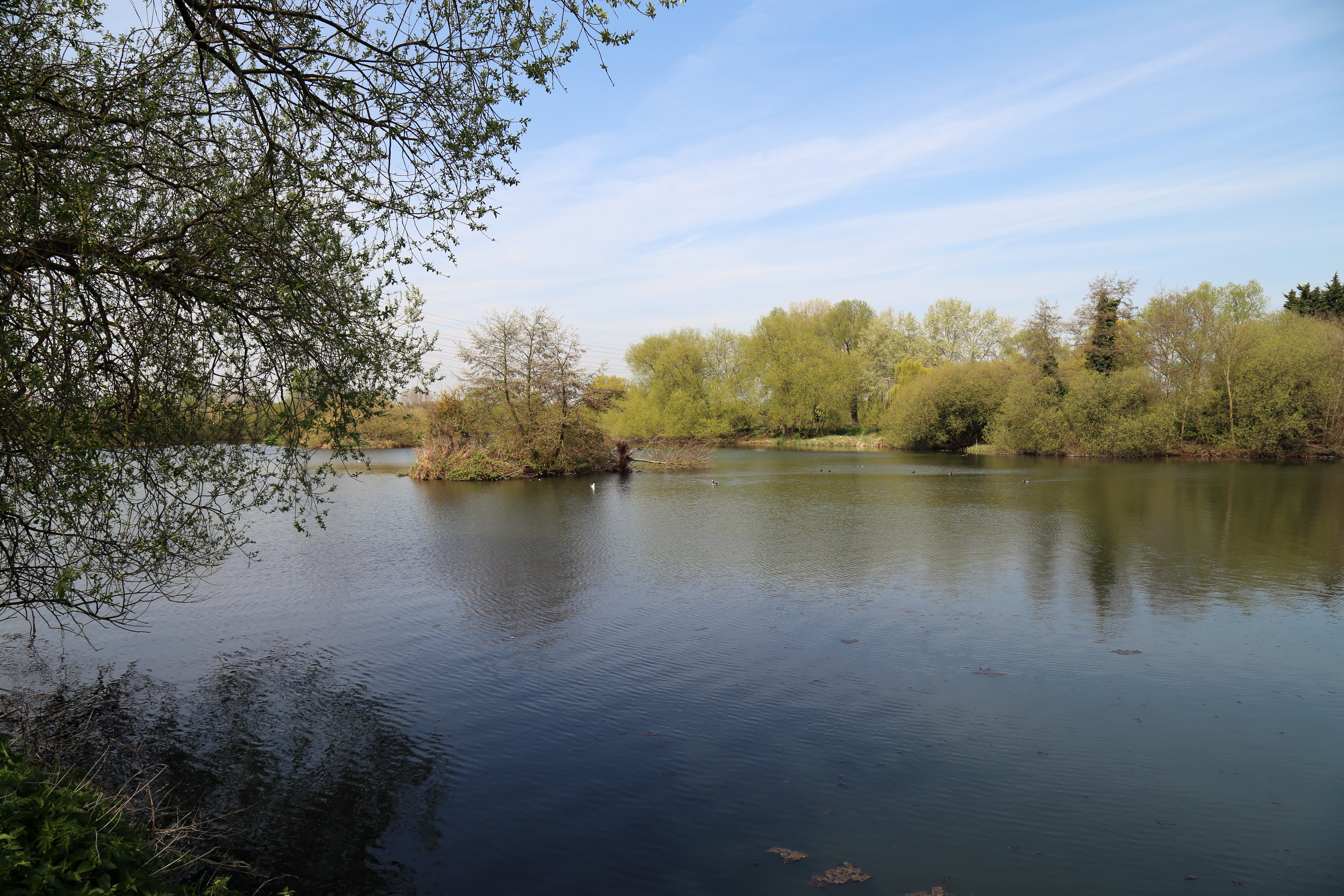
Hooks Marsh Lake at Fishers Green

Fishers Green is a hamlet in the parish of Waltham Abbey in Essex, England, lying 1 mile (1.6 km) to the north of the main built-up area. It lies on the flood plain of the River Lea.

== Description ==
In the years following World War II much of the flood plain was given over to gravel extraction. The resulting lakes form part of the River Lee Country Park wetland reserve and the Turnford and Cheshunt Pits a SSSI. The lakes are popular for angling and sailing and are an important wildlife site. Seventy Acres Lake provides the ideal habitat for many species of birds and is the home of the national bittern watchpoint. Two watercourses flow through the locality; a natural channel of the River Lea known as the Old River Lea and the River Lee Flood Relief Channel. The Old River Lea is nationally renowned for its barbel and chub angling and is one of only four rivers in the UK where barbel are an indigenous species. In March 2012 an angler landed a 9 pounds 5 ounces (4.2 kg) chub from the River Lea, equalling the largest recorded from a British river. Incorporated into the 180 acres (73 ha) Holyfield Lake (Langridge), is the River Lee Flood Relief Channel forming part of a flood management area managed by the Environment Agency. The Lee Valley Farms and the visitor centre are located at Fishers Green in Stubbins Hall Lane. They are owned and managed by the Lee Valley Regional Park Authority and are open to the public.

== Access ==
Fishers Green is 1 mile (1.6 km) north of Waltham Abbey on the B194 road, known as the Crooked Mile at this point. Access is at Stubbins Hall Lane to the west of the road. Pedestrian and cycle access to the site is also available via public paths from Cheshunt railway station.
