= Upshire =

Village in Essex, England

Coordinates: 51.6904°N 0.045419°E

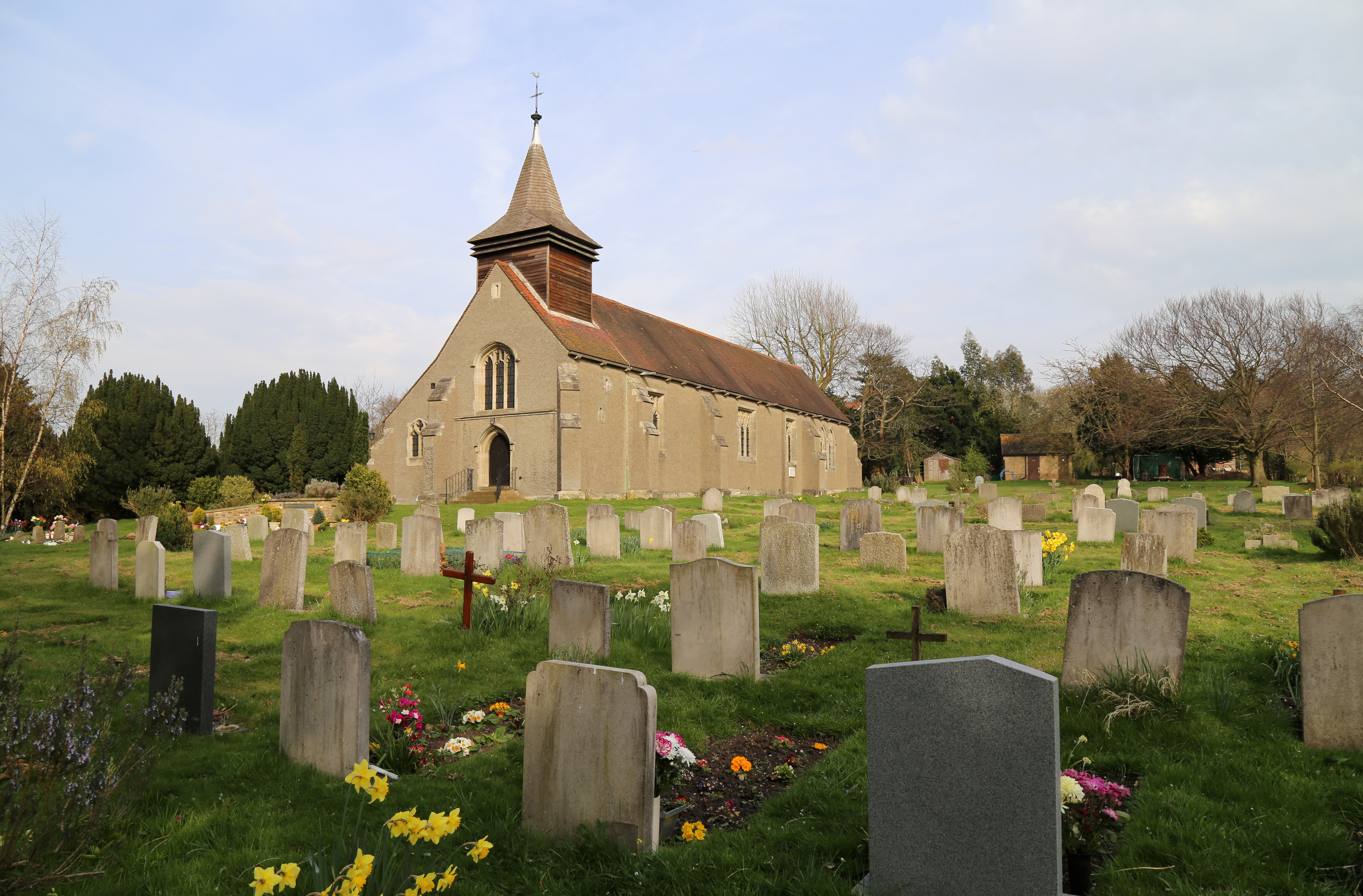
- Church of St Thomas and graveyard from the south-west

- Location within Essex
- OS grid reference: TL414010
  - London: 10 mi (16 km) S
- Civil parish: Waltham Abbey
- District: Epping Forest
- Shire county: Essex
- Region: East
- Country: England
- Sovereign state: United Kingdom
- Post town: WALTHAM ABBEY
- Postcode district: EN9
- Dialling code: 01992
- Police: Essex
- Fire: Essex
- Ambulance: East of England
- UK Parliament: Epping Forest

Upshire is a village in the civil parish of Waltham Abbey in the Epping Forest District of Essex, England. The centre of the village is on Horseshoe Hill (a minor road), on which is The Horseshoe public house, and the church of St Thomas, a Grade II* listed building in Arts and Crafts style dating from 1902. Areas of built-up Waltham Abbey around Upshire Road and Pick Hill, most of which was developed in the latter half of the 20th century including northern parts of the Ninefields Estate, are also considered part of Upshire.

The M25 motorway passes close to the village. Less than half-a-mile (650m) to the north-east is the hamlet of Copthall Green. Education is provided by Upshire Primary Foundation School. Jade Goody died here in 2009, from cervical cancer.
