= Cornmill Stream =

River in Essex, England

Coordinates: 51.689663°N 0.001856°W

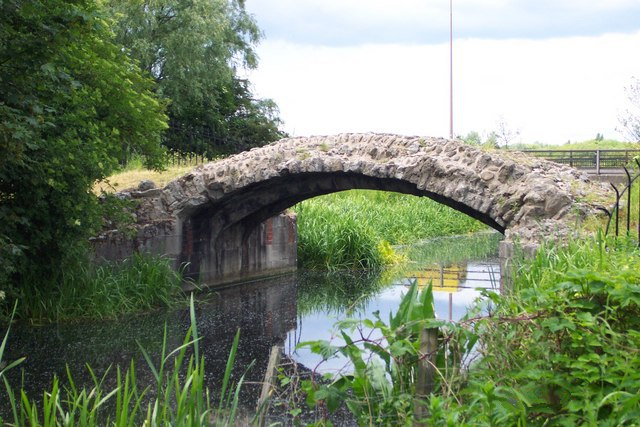
Harold's bridge spanning the Cornmill Stream

The Cornmill Stream is a minor tributary of the River Lea in the English county of Essex.

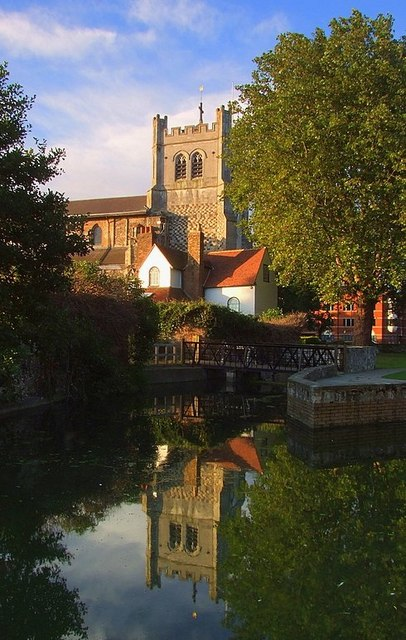
The stream above Waltham Abbey church

== History ==
The stream is an artificial watercourse which may have been built by 1086 to serve the mills mentioned in the Domesday Book at Waltham Abbey.

== Course ==
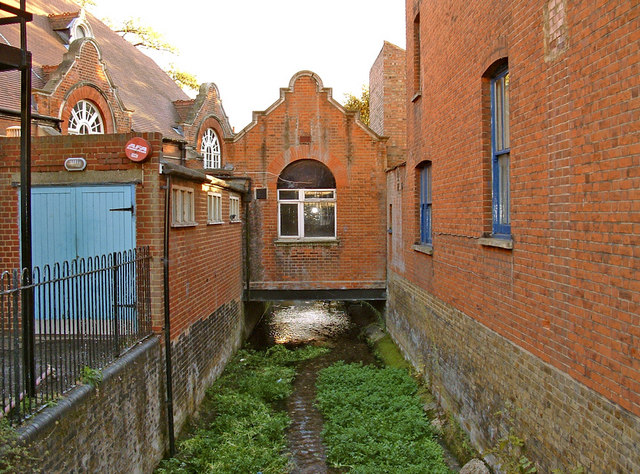
The stream at Waltham Abbey town hall

After leaving the River Lee Flood Relief Channel (Horsemill Stream) at Fishers Green the stream flows south to form the western boundary with the former Waltham Abbey Royal Gunpowder Mills before flowing through the Waltham Abbey SSSI within the Gunpowder Mills property. Above Waltham Abbey the stream diverges from the Old River Lea with both channels bordering the Cornmill Stream and Old River Lea, SSSI. The stream passes under the 14th-century Harold's Bridge and the B194 road (Abbey View) before flowing through a sluice in the abbey's grounds. The stream flows underground to emerge adjacent to Waltham Abbey town hall. After flowing through an urban area, it rejoins the River Lee Flood Relief Channel beyond the town of Waltham Abbey.
