= A121 road (England) =

Road in London, England

Coordinates: 51.6667°N 0.06463°E

A121

Route information
- Length: 10 mi (16 km)

Major junctions
- North end: Waltham Cross
- South end: Woodford Green

Location
- Country: United Kingdom
- Constituent country: England
- Primary destinations: Waltham Cross Loughton

Road network
- Roads in the United Kingdom; Motorways; A and B road zones
← A120	→ A123

The A121 road is a road in England connecting Waltham Cross and Woodford Wells.

== Major settlements ==
The main settlements on it are Waltham Abbey and Loughton. It also passes through Buckhurst Hill. For much of its length, it passes through the densest part of Epping Forest via Woodredon and Goldings Hills.

== History ==
The A121 south of the Wake Arms Roundabout is the course of the old turnpike road, and itself includes two by-passes around steep hills at Lower Road, Loughton and North End, on the Loughton- Buckhurst Hill boundary.

== M25 J26 ==
The A121 meets the M25 at Junction 26 (Waltham Abbey Interchange).
