= Waltham Abbey Royal Gunpowder Mills =

Former industrial site in Waltham Abbey, England

Coordinates: 51.693°N 0.009°W

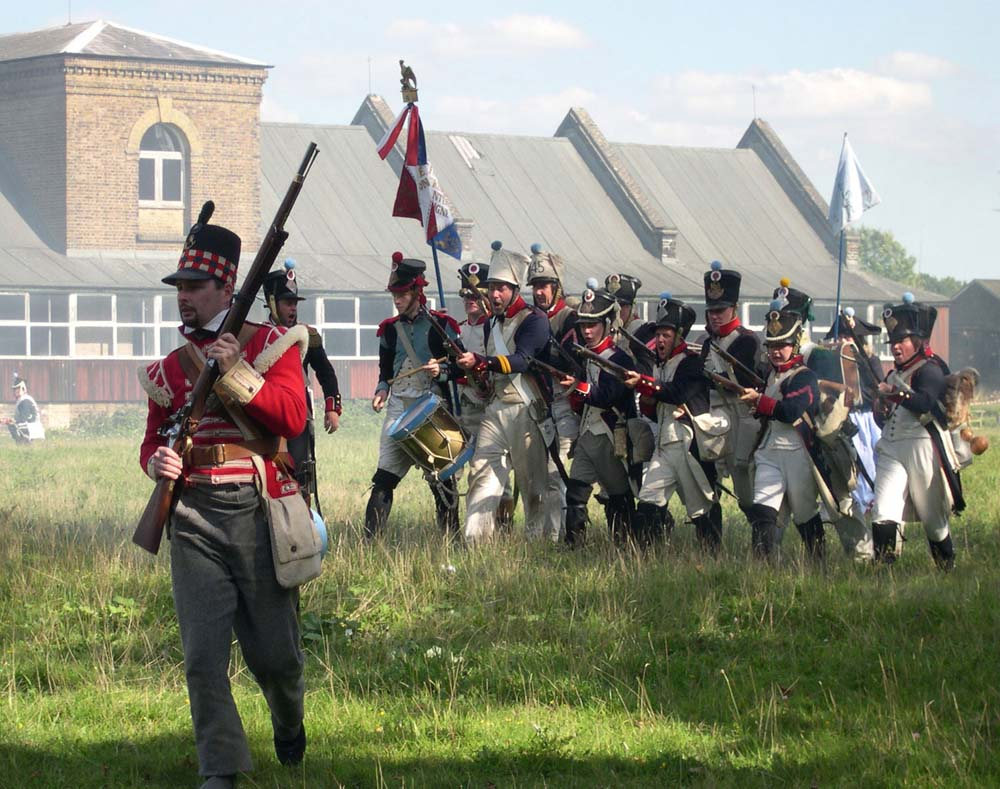
Napoleonic War battle reenactment event

The Royal Gunpowder Mills are a former industrial site in Waltham Abbey, England. It was one of three Royal Gunpowder Mills in the United Kingdom (the others being at Ballincollig and Faversham). Waltham Abbey is the only site to have survived virtually intact.

The Royal Gunpowder Mills, Waltham Abbey, were in operation for over 300 years. Starting in the mid-1850s the site became involved in the development of revolutionary nitro-based explosives and propellants known as "smokeless powder". The site grew in size, and black powder became less important.

Shortly after the Second World War it became solely a Defence Research Establishment – firstly the Explosives Research and Development Establishment, then the Propellants, Explosives and Rocket Motor Establishment Waltham Abbey; and finally the Royal Armament Research and Development Establishment Waltham Abbey.

== History ==
=== Gunpowder production ===
Gunpowder manufacture is believed to have commenced on the site in the mid seventeen century, making use of the site and the water supplies of a medieval water-powered fulling mill that had later been used as an Oil mill. Water is obtained from the River Lea and the water flowed though the Gunpowder Mills site, controlled by sluices and locks, though various canalised watercourses, some of which are man-made and date back to the seventeen century, or earlier: Cornmill Stream, Millhead Stream; and out, again though the River Lea and /or the Lee Flood Relief Channel, constructed from 1947 on wards. The river provided water for both powering some of the gunpowder mills as well as allowing the passage of specialised barges, either within the site, or into and out of the site. (Note: Some of the waterways within the Royal Gunpowder Mills Museum site are long silted up, others are not and have either flowing or static water. A small number gunpowder barges still remain within the museum site: either derelict and submerged in the canals, or displayed on land within the site.)

This gunpowder works was to become one of the main suppliers of gunpowder to the Ordnance Board. The Government acquired the site, at the instigation of deputy comptroller of the Royal Laboratory at Woolwich, Sir William Congreve, 1st Baronet, for the production of gunpowder in 1787. The purchase took place on 18 October 1787, with the Crown purchasing the mills for £10,000 from a Mr Walton. A further, immediate, expenditure of almost £7,989.00 was needed to get the buildings into servicable order. This took 18 months: the re-building work and the presence of these workmen on site prevented any gunpowder from being produced on the site until February 1789.

=== Nitrocellulose production ===
In the 1830s and 1840s various chemists had discovered that cellulose, in the form of cotton, paper, starch, or wood fibres, could be nitrated; and that the product of these reactions, if left to dry for a few hours, or a few days, would burn readily. Christian Friedrich Schönbein, at Basel and Rudolf Christian Böttger, of Frankfurt_am_Main appear to have independently produced a nitrated cotton in 1846; and then worked together to promote it as a possible replacement for gunpowder. They visited the Royal Arsenal, that year, to promote their findings. The explosive manufacturer John Hall & Sons, of Faversham, bought the patent and gained the sole right to manufacture it in England. He opened the world's first guncotton factory, at their Marsh Works, Faversham. The explosives works was totally destroyed when it exploded on 14 July 1847, killing 18 to 20 of the workers. The works never reopened. Similar explosions took place at two factories in France, so no guncotton was produced after this in England nor France for about sixteen years.

From 1849, Captain Wilhelm Lenk von Wolfsberg, in Austria, began to work with nitrocellose; he produced nitrocellulose that was acceptable for military use. He patented its method of production on 4 June 1864 and was asked to give lectures in France and in England where Frederick Abel, Ordnance Chemist at the Royal Arsenal became interested.

=== Cordite production ===
During Second World War, Waltham Abbey remained an important cordite production unit and for the first two years of the war was the sole producer of RDX. RDX is one component of torpex, the explosive that was used in the Bouncing Bomb. RDX production was transferred to ROF Bridgwater and cordite production was dispersed to new propellant factories at ROF Bishopton, ROF Wrexham and ROF Ranskill. The Royal Gunpowder Mills finally closed on 28 July 1945.

The establishment re-opened as a research centre known as the Explosives Research and Development Establishment, or ERDE, in 1945. It became the Propellants, Explosives and Rocket Motor Establishment, Waltham Abbey, or PERME Waltham Abbey in 1977. The rocket activity later extended to the production of rocket motors, including work on the Skylark project. The South site and the Lower Island works were handed over to Royal Ordnance plc immediately before it was privatised in 1984.

The North side however remained in Ministry of Defence control as a research centre; becoming part of the Royal Armament Research and Development Establishment. After various reorganisations, the research centre finally closed in 1991. Since 1999, the Mills are an Anchor Point of the European Route of Industrial Heritage, set in 175 acres (0.71 km^{2}) of parkland and containing 21 buildings of major historical importance.

== Sale of the North site by the Ministry of Defence ==
=== Heritage site ===
A large area of the north site is listed as the Waltham Abbey SSSI and another separate area is a scheduled monument. Visitors can see exhibits related to gunpowder making, tour the site on a land train. An attempt to demolish the cordite mills and replace them with dormitories for young people staying at a children's activity centre was rejected by Epping Forest District Council in 2016 after exposure in the national press.

=== Narrow-gauge railway ===
The 2 ft 6 in (762 mm) gauge narrow-gauge railway is 1,100 yards (1,000 m) long and has two stations. It is known as the Gunpowder Railway.

List of locomotives
Name	Builder	Works number	Type	Built	Notes	Image
John H. Bowles	Baguley-Drewry	3755	4wDH	1981		
	Ruhrthaler	3920	0-4-0DH	1969		
	Hunslet	8819	4wDH	1979		
	Hunslet	8828	0-4-0BE	1979		
Budleigh	Ruston & Hornsby	235624	4wDM	1945	18 in (457 mm) ex-Bicton Woodland Railway	

== Sale of the South site by Royal Ordnance ==
After the South site, also known as Quinton Hill, was vacated and also decontaminated and redeveloped, much of the remaining land was converted into the 255 acres (103 ha) Gunpowder Park, which is part of the Lee Valley Park and was opened in 2004. The regenerated parkland is dedicated to the arts, science and wildlife.

== Waltham Abbey Royal Gunpowder Mills in popular culture ==
- The War of the Worlds by H. G. Wells Book 1 Chapter 17 'The Thunder Child' Here there were rumours of Martians at Epping, and news of the destruction of Waltham Abbey Powdermills in a vain attempt to blow up one of the invaders.
- The mill also appears in Michael Ondaatje's 2018 novel Warlight: Shortly after the end of World War II the protagonist Nathaniel Williams helps his mentor, 'The Darter', transporting illegal greyhounds and, later, boxed cargo inland through the canal network from the River Thames, including the Gunpowder Mills canal system.
- On 3 May 2020 the mills were featured in an episode of the BBCs Countryfile programme.
- Author and naturalist Helen Macdonald visited the site in the BBC4 programme The Hidden Wilds of the Motorway broadcast on 30 June 2020.

== Digital archive ==
After the closure of the Explosives Research and Development Establishment (ERDE) and its successor organisations, the inherited archive material passed through a number of hands and storage locations, particularly in the latter period before the opening of part of the site to the public, when outside staff from the firm designing the exhibition had to have free access. Consequently, by 2001 the archive had become rather disorganised. The opportunity was taken to start a ground-up exercise involving a complete check of the holding and the design of computer databases of the material in order to produce the digital catalogue.

- The archive has been digitised and is available to view online at www.wargm.org.
- Funding for the online archive was donated by the Royal Gunpowder Mills Friends Association.
- The archive is also listed on The National Archives website.

== See also ==
- Ballincollig Royal Gunpowder Mills
- B. Hick & Son
- Cordite
- Faversham explosives industry
- Gunpowder
- Gunpowder magazines in England
- TNT
- RDX
- J. E. Gordon
