= Waltham Abbey =

Town in Essex, England

Coordinates: 51.6846°N 0.0004°E

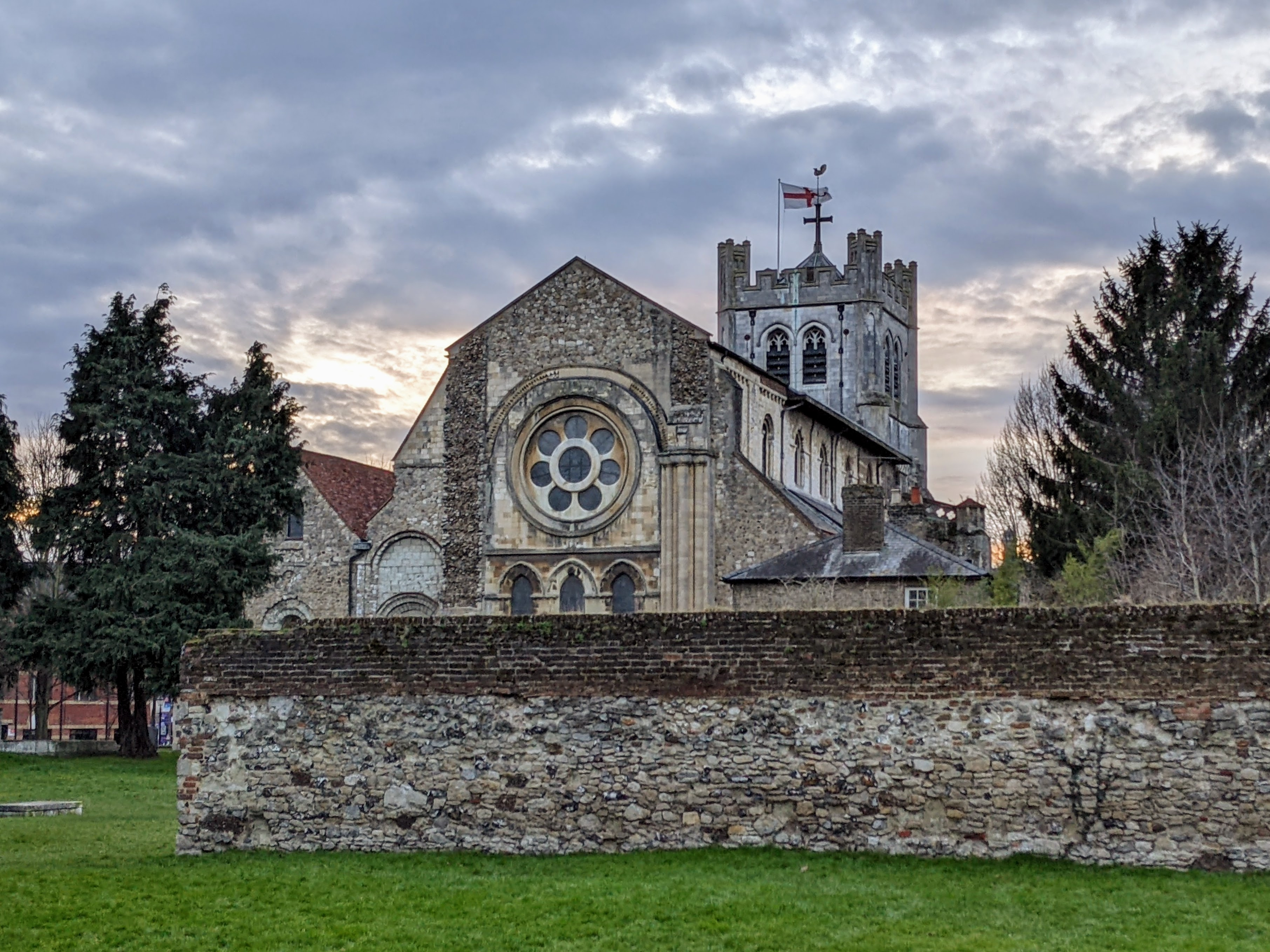
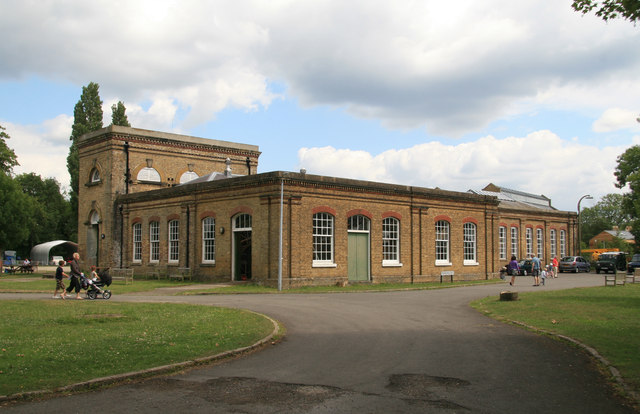
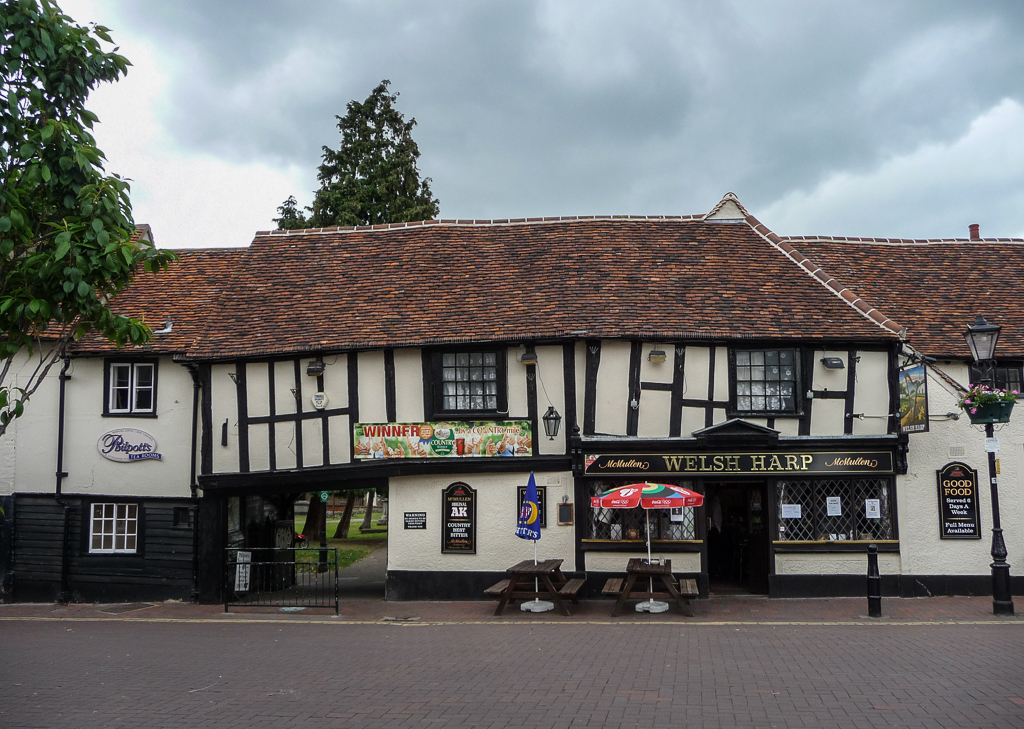
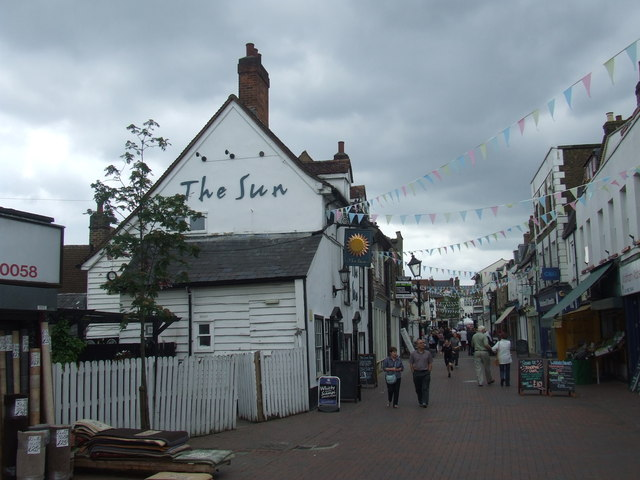
- Clockwise from top: Waltham Abbey Church and ruins, the Royal Gunpowder Mills, pedestrianised Sun Street, the Welsh Harp public house, and Waltham Abbey Town Hall

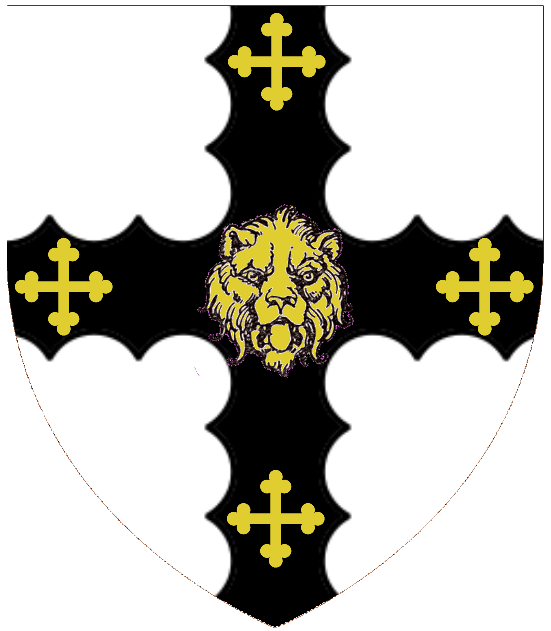
- Coat of arms of Waltham Abbey
- Interactive map of Waltham Abbey
- Area: 16.3746 sq mi (42.410 km^{2})
- Population: 22,858 (Parish, 2021); 18,645 (Built up area, 2021)
  - Density: 1,396/sq mi (539/km^{2})
- OS grid reference: TL385005
  - Charing Cross: 14 mi (23 km) SW
- Civil parish: Waltham Abbey
- District: Epping Forest
- Shire county: Essex
- Region: East
- Country: England
- Sovereign state: United Kingdom
- Post town: WALTHAM ABBEY
- Postcode district: EN9
- Post town: LONDON
- Postcode district: E4
- Post town: LOUGHTON
- Postcode district: IG10
- Dialling code: 01992; 020
- UK Parliament: Epping Forest
- Website: https://www.walthamabbey-tc.gov.uk/

Waltham Abbey (/ˈwɔːlθəmˈæbi/ WAWL-thəm-AB-ee) is a suburban town and civil parish in the Epping Forest District of Essex, within the metropolitan and urban area of London, England, 13.5 miles (21.7 km) north-east of Charing Cross. Situated in the Lea Valley, the town lies on the Greenwich Meridian between the River Lea in the west and Epping Forest in the east, with large sections forming part of the Metropolitan Green Belt.

The town borders Chingford to the south; Loughton, Theydon Bois and Buckhurst Hill to the east; Cheshunt, Waltham Cross and Enfield to the west; and the rural areas of Nazeing and Epping Upland to the north. As well as the main built-up area, it covers the areas of Claverhambury, Fishers Green, High Beach, Holyfield, Lippitts Hill, Sewardstone, Sewardstonebury and Upshire. At the 2021 census, it had a population of 22,859.

The town is named and renowned for its former abbey, the last in England to be dissolved, now the Abbey Church of Waltham Holy Cross and St Lawrence—a scheduled ancient monument and the town's parish church. A place of worship since the 7th century, it became a place of pilgrimage following the Legend of the Holy Cross in the 11th century, and was rebuilt and re-founded by King Harold Godwinson, the last Anglo-Saxon king of England, in 1060. It is believed to be Harold's final resting place after his death at the Battle of Hastings in 1066. Open to the public as Waltham Abbey Gardens, the grounds of the abbey and Cornmill Meadows are maintained by the Lee Valley Regional Park Authority. Along the town's eastern edge is much of Epping Forest, maintained by the City of London Corporation; entirely within it is the village of High Beach. In the south is Gilwell Park, which since 1919 has formed an important site for the worldwide Scout movement. Following the course of the River Lea along the town's western boundary with Hertfordshire and historic Middlesex is the Lee Valley Regional Park, where the Lee Valley White Water Centre hosted the canoe slalom events of the London 2012 Olympic Games. For over 300 years, the Royal Gunpowder Mills on the Millhead Stream were in operation, where many of the processes used in the explosives industry were invented and developed; it today forms a scheduled ancient monument site with many listed buildings, and is a site of special scientific interest.

Historically an ancient parish named Waltham Holy Cross in the Waltham hundred of Essex, it became a local government district in 1850, and was granted urban district status in 1894. The town was granted a charter to host a regular market by Richard I in 1189, and it remains a market town. Whilst the use of the name Waltham Abbey for the town dates back to the 16th century at the earliest, it never officially had that name until 1974, when the successor parish covering the former Waltham Holy Cross Urban District was named Waltham Abbey. It was included in the Metropolitan Police District in 1840, and the London postal district upon its inception in 1856. It formed part of the review area for the Royal Commission on Local Government in Greater London, but did not become part of the Greater London administrative area in 1965. Its administrative headquarters have been at Waltham Abbey Town Hall since 1904. The town gives its name to the American city of Waltham in Middlesex County, Massachusetts (on the outskirts of Boston), and is twinned with the German town of Hörstel.

== Toponymy ==
The name Waltham derives from weald or wald "forest" and ham "homestead" or "enclosure". The name of the ancient parish was usually given as "Waltham Holy Cross" in civil matters and "Waltham Abbey" in ecclesiastical matters. The use of the name Waltham Abbey for the main settlement in the parish seems to have originated in the 16th century, although there has often been inconsistency in the use of the two names. Despite the similar name, the parish never included Waltham Cross on the opposite side of the River Lea, which formed part of the parish of Cheshunt in Hertfordshire. The civil parish of Waltham Holy Cross was formally renamed Waltham Abbey in 1974.

== History ==
=== Early history ===
There are traces of prehistoric and Roman settlement in the town. Ermine Street lies only 5 km west and the causeway across the River Lea from Waltham Cross in Hertfordshire may be a Roman construction. A local legend claims that Boudica's rebellion against the Romans ended in the neighbourhood, when she poisoned herself with hemlock gathered on the banks of Cobbins Brook.

There has been a church on the site of Waltham Abbey since the 7th century. Traces of the flint rubble foundations of a 7th-century wooden church have been found under the choir of the present building; an associated burial has been radiocarbon dated to between 590 and 690. A proposed date of circa 610 would place its construction in the reign of Sæberht of Essex, who was noted for his church-building activities. Other finds included a 7th-century Kentish jewellery book-clasp depicting eagles grasping a fish.

=== Abbey as main landowner ===
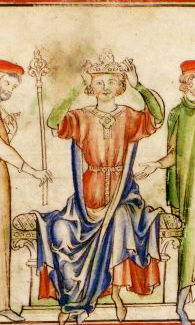
Harold Godwinson

The recorded history of the town began during the reign of Canute in the early 11th century when his standard-bearer Tovi or Tofig the Proud, founded (or rebuilt) a church here to house the miraculous cross discovered at Montacute in Somerset. It is this cross that gave Waltham the earliest suffix to its name. After Tovi's death around 1045, Waltham reverted to the King (Edward the Confessor), who gave it to the Earl Harold Godwinson (later king). Harold rebuilt Tovi's church in stone around 1060, in gratitude it is said for his cure from a paralysis, through praying before the miraculous cross. Waltham's people used the abbey as their parish church, and paid their tithes, worked the glebe as well any of their lord's land, and paid other dues to the canons.

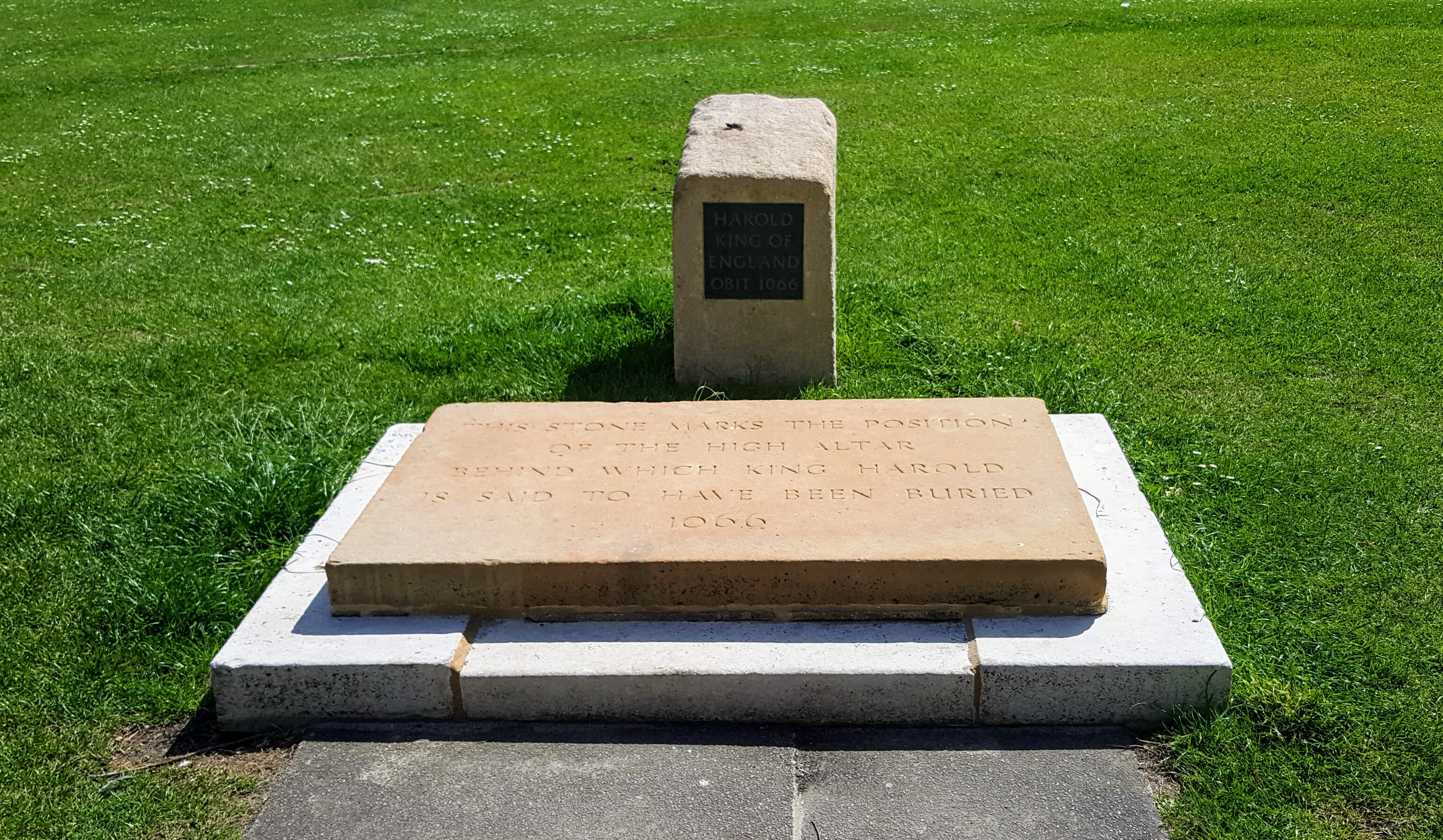
King Harold's tombstone at Waltham Abbey; site of the High Altar

Legend has it that after his death at the Battle of Hastings in 1066, Harold's body was brought to Waltham for burial near to the High Altar. Today, the spot is marked by a stone slab in the churchyard (originally the site of the high altar before the Reformation).

In 1177, as part of his penance for his part in the murder of Thomas Becket, Archbishop of Canterbury, Henry II refounded Harold's church as a priory of Augustinian Canons Regular of sixteen canons and a prior or dean. In 1184, this was enlarged so that Waltham became an abbey with an abbot and twenty-four canons, which grew to be the richest monastery in Essex. The town grew to the west and south of the abbey.

In 1189, the town was chartered by Richard the Lionheart to host regular markets and fairs. The market continues to run today, and is held at the town's market square on Tuesdays and Saturdays.

In the medieval and early Tudor periods, there were two guilds in the parish, each with an endowment for a priest: the Brotherhood of Our Lady, and the Charnel Guild, whose priest was also the parish curate. The former, which existed from at least 1375, occupied the Lady Chapel in the parochial part of the church. The Charnel Guild, which occurs as 'the Sepulchre' in 1366, probably used its crypt.

Henry VIII was a frequent visitor and is said to have had a house or lodge at Romeland, adjacent to the abbey. During their summer progress of 1532, Henry and Queen Anne Boleyn stayed at Waltham Abbey for five days.

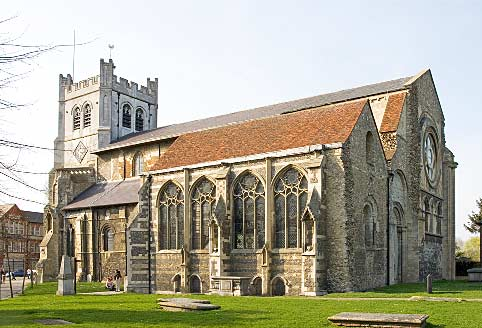
Waltham Abbey

The town's dependence on the Abbey is signalled by its decline after the Abbey was dissolved and partially demolished in 1540, the last working abbey or monastery to be dissolved. Waltham Abbey vicarage is a 17th-century timber framed and plastered building. It was given by Edward Denny, 1st Earl of Norwich to create the first curacy, but was much altered in the 18th century and later, and was more recently architecturally Grade II*listed. In the early 19th century the church held three Sunday services, including one in the evening for the local factory workers. In 1862, Holy Communion was celebrated monthly and attended by about 100.

=== Post-Reformation ===
In the 17th century there were four churchwardens (who fulfilled some roles of local government, collected and distributing poor relief): one each for the town, Holyfield, Upshire, and Sewardstone. Joseph Hall, curate from 1608, was later Bishop successively of Exeter and Norwich. A complete diocesan list of curates was printed to 1888 and Thomas Fuller, author of The Worthies of England and of the first History of Waltham Abbey, was curate 1649–58.

In the 17th century, a gunpowder factory was opened in the town, no doubt due to good river communications and empty marshland by the River Lea and this now forms the museum below.

The population of the town was 2,041 in the 1841 census.

=== Post-Industrial Revolution ===
The factory was sold to the government in 1787 and was greatly expanded during the next century, becoming the Waltham Abbey Royal Gunpowder Mills. In the 19th century, searches began for more powerful and reliant propellant explosives, and guncotton was developed here by Frederick Abel, starting in 1863. Cordite production began in 1891 and the site was enlarged several times. The site was an obvious target during World War II, and a German V-2 rocket landed near the factory in Highbridge Street on 7 March 1945, causing considerable damage to property and large loss of life. The factory eventually closed in 1943, and the site was developed into an explosives research establishment. There was also a fulling mill at Sewardstone around 1777 and a pin factory by 1805. Silk and calico printing were also important industries. The River Lee Navigation was also improved, a new canal cut across the marshes was opened in 1769, bringing more trade to the town. Outside the town, the parish is largely rural and agriculture has been an important occupation.

In the first half of the 20th century, the area was extensively covered in glass-houses and market gardens. Gravel extraction has also long been a major industry in the Lea Valley, leaving a legacy of pits now used for recreation and an important wildlife habitat. In 1959–60 all of the church's houses and land were converted to stock or bank investments. No rectory has existed – the benefice before becoming the present vicarage serving four churches in the wider area was a perpetual curacy — a relevant fact for the purposes of chancel repair liability that therefore cannot exist. In the 1960s and 1970s, the population of the town increased, partly by an extensive programme of clearances and redevelopment in the town centre, and partly by the development of housing estates on the outskirts, such as Roundhills and Ninefields.

== Governance ==
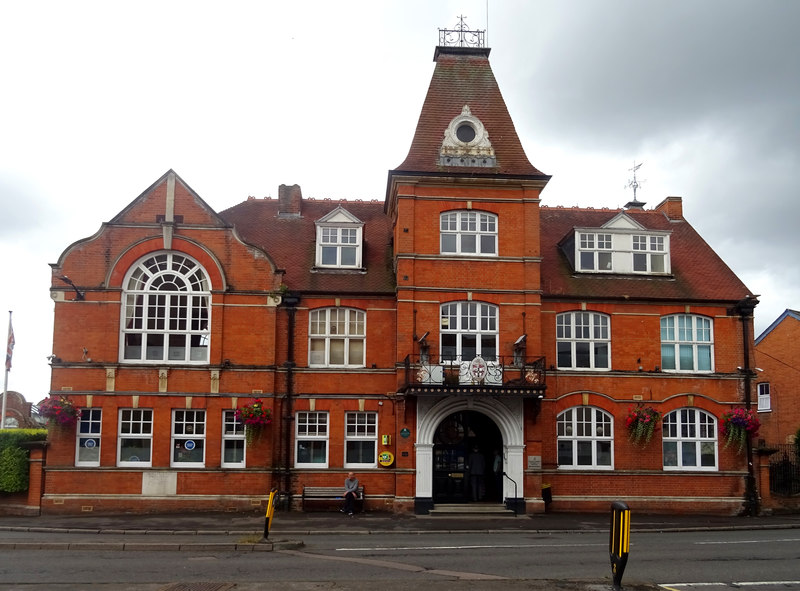
Waltham Abbey Town Hall

There are three tiers of local government covering Waltham Abbey, at parish (town), district and county level: Waltham Abbey Town Council, Epping Forest District Council and Essex County Council. The town council is based at Waltham Abbey Town Hall on Highbridge Street.

Waltham Abbey has formed part of the Epping Forest parliamentary constituency since 1974, represented by Dr Neil Hudson MP of the Conservative Party since 2024. Prior to 1974, the town formed part of the Epping constituency, served by Sir Winston Churchill as its Member of Parliament between 1924 and 1945. Other previous MPs include Dame Eleanor Laing, Steve Norris, John Biggs-Davison, and Norman Tebbit.

=== Administrative history ===
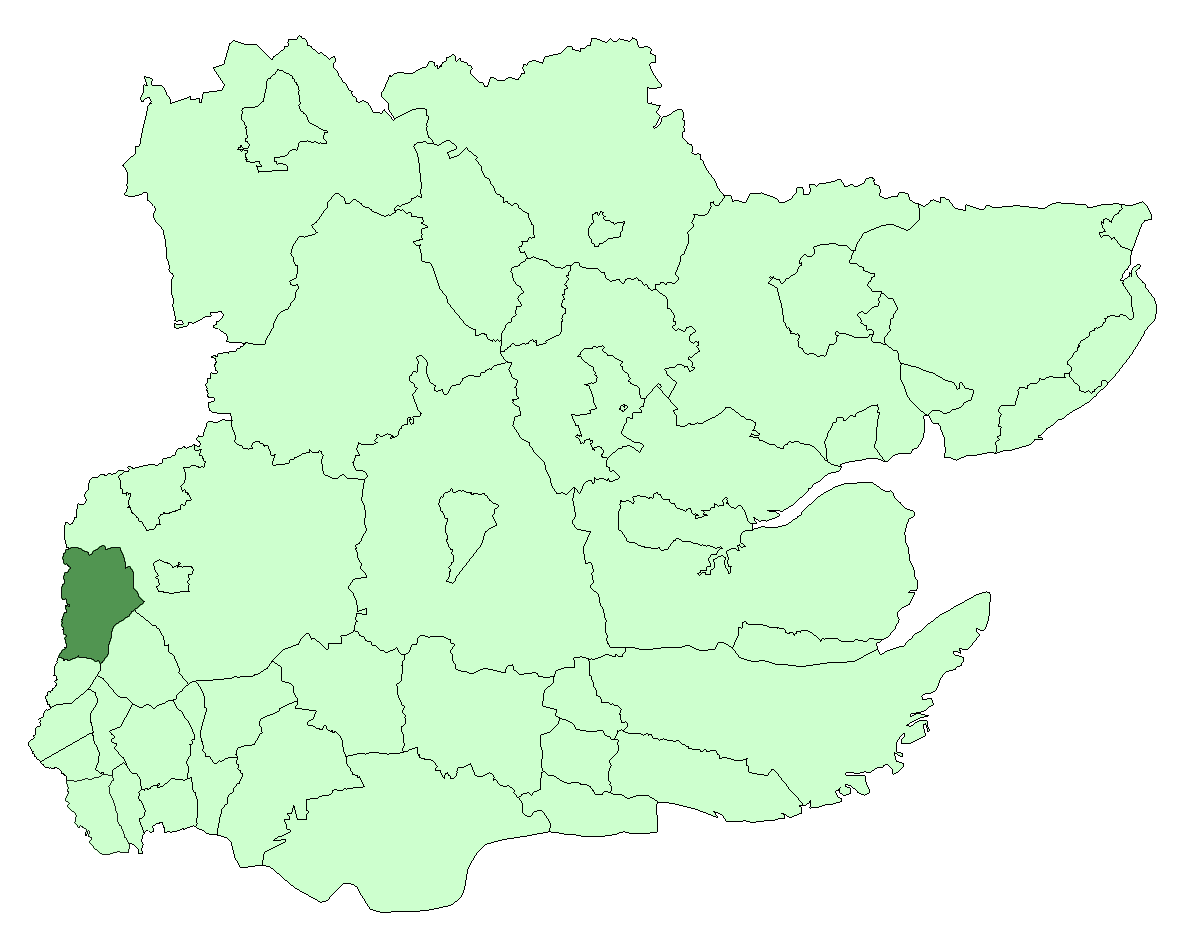
Waltham Abbey within Essex in 1961, prior to the creation of Greater London and the Epping Forest District

The ancient parish of Waltham Holy Cross was in the Waltham Hundred of Essex. Although officially and ecclesiastically named Waltham Holy Cross, it was commonly known simply as Waltham Abbey. The parish was divided into four wards: Township, Upshire, Holyfield, and Sewardstone. From 1836, the parish formed part of the Poor Law Union of Edmonton. The parish was included in the Metropolitan Police District in 1840.

The whole parish was made a local board of health district in 1850, governed by a local board. Such districts were reconstituted as urban districts in 1894 under the Local Government Act 1894, so it became the Waltham Holy Cross Urban District. The urban district council built itself the Town Hall in 1904 to serve as its headquarters.

Following the Local Government Act 1929, in 1932 it was proposed that it should be merged with Chingford to form a new urban district of 'Chingford and Waltham Abbey'. The amalgamation was supported by Chingford Urban District Council but was not supported by the Waltham Holy Cross Urban District Council, who feared increased rates and the potential loss of the annual fair and market. The lack of a direct rail connection between the districts was also highlighted. The review resulted in no amalgamation, and only a small transfer of territory from Waltham Holy Cross to Chingford following a county review order in 1934.

As it formed part of the Registrar General's definition of the Greater London Conurbation, the urban district formed part of the review area for the Royal Commission on Local Government in Greater London. However, it did not subsequently become part of the Greater London administrative area created in 1965, because it was surrounded by the Metropolitan Green Belt and had limited connection to the London built-up area.

The urban district was abolished in 1974 to become part of the new Epping Forest District. A successor parish was created covering the former Waltham Holy Cross Urban District, but with the new parish being named Waltham Abbey rather than Waltham Holy Cross. The new parish council created in 1974 resolved that the parish should have the status of a town under the Local Government Act 1972, allowing it to take the name Waltham Abbey Town Council.

Following devolution in 2000, control of the Metropolitan Police was transferred to the newly-created Greater London Authority. It was initially proposed that areas outside the Greater London Authority boundary would remain under the Metropolitan Police. However, in the Greater London Authority Act 1999, the boundaries of the Metropolitan Police District were redefined to match Greater London. On 1 April 2000, Waltham Abbey, alongside Loughton, Buckhurst Hill and Chigwell, was transferred to Essex Police, bringing an end to 160 years in the London police district.

== Geography ==
The River Lea, which forms the county boundary with Hertfordshire, is the town's western boundary, and the eastern boundary runs through Epping Forest. The land rises gradually from the marshes and meadows by the river to a small plateau of london clay in the east, 60–90 metres above sea level, capped in the highest parts by the sand and gravel of Epping Forest. On the river the elevations range from 22m in the northwest (Note: At Holyfield Marsh) to 13.5m in the southwest (Note: West of the road Sewardstone Gardens at the foot of Yardley Hill and on the border with Chingford). To the southwest, occupying a former course of the River Lea, is the King George V Reservoir, opened in 1913. Cobbins Brook, a tributary of the River Lea, crosses the parish from east to west. Waltham Abbey parish includes in its 41 km^{2} the villages and hamlets of High Beach, Holyfield, Sewardstone and Upshire. The M25 motorway runs to the south of the town through the middle of the parish and can be accessed east of the town at Junction 26 via Honey Lane or the rural relief road, the A121 directly south of the motorway.

The north-west of the parish contains part of the Lee Valley Park. Most of the parish, and the majority of its population, are within the Waltham Abbey post town of the EN postcode area. However, lightly populated parts to the south are within the Loughton post town of the IG postcode area, and the Sewardstone and Gilwell Park areas to the southwest are within the E postcode area of the London post town.

Following a county review order in 1934, an area of 58 acres with a population of 23 (in 1931) was transferred to Chingford Urban District.

The Enfield Island Village area was transferred from Waltham Abbey to the London Borough of Enfield in 1994.

=== Villages and Hamlets ===
The main settlement in the parish is the town of Waltham Abbey. Within the parish, there are several villages and hamlets:

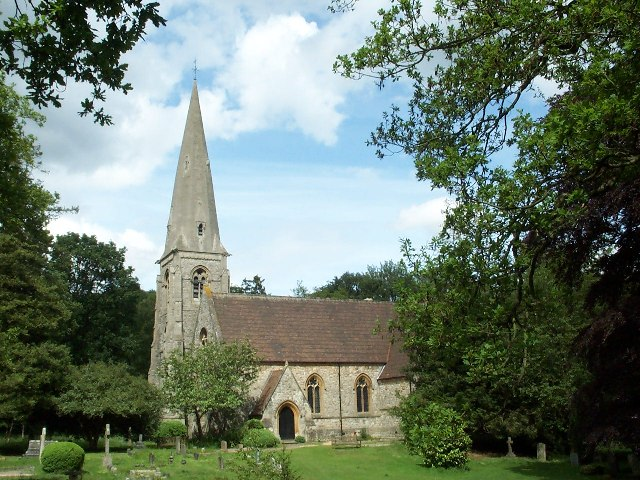
Church of the Holy Innocents, High Beech

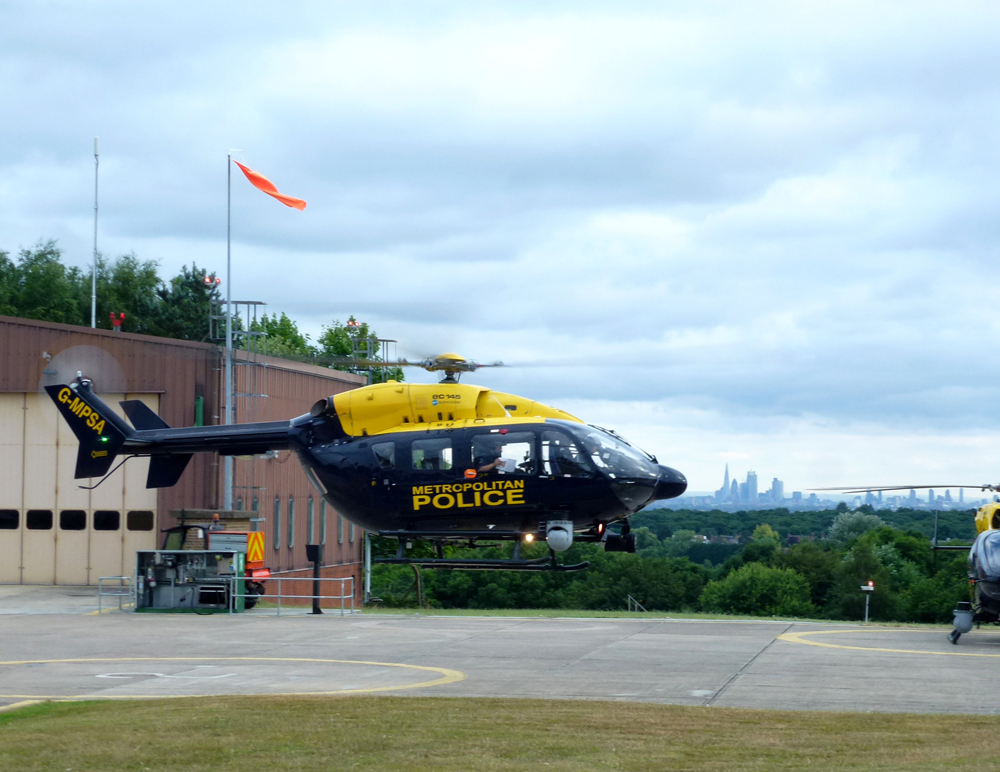
Metropolitan Police Air Support Unit at Lippitts Hill

High Beach (also spelt High Beech) is a village within the parish, lying entirely within Epping Forest, approximately 2 miles (3.2 km) south-east of the town centre. It is the location of Lippitts Hill and the Metropolitan Police Air Support Unit.

Sewardstone is a hamlet located south of the town of Waltham Abbey. It is 11.6 miles north-northeast of Central London and is in the London commuter belt.

Sewardstonebury is a hamlet located south of the town of Waltham Abbey. It is located approximately 18 km (11 miles) northeast of Charing Cross.

Upshire is a village in the parish, located to the east of Waltham Abbey. The centre of the village is on Horseshoe Hill (a minor road), on which is The Horseshoe public house, and the church of St Thomas, a Grade II* listed building in Arts and Crafts style dating from 1902.

Claverhambury, located north of Waltham Abbey, consists of approximately 15 homes and farms by two woods, Deerpark Wood and Stockings Grove, to the north-east of the town centre. Its bounds are the eastern slopes of Galley Hill. The western side of this hilltop is wooded. It is directly south of Epping Long Green, a tall ridge topped by the Stort Valley Way footpath between the towns of Epping and Harlow.

Fishers Green is a locality 1 mile (1.6 km) north of the town of Waltham Abbey on the B194 road on the section known as the Crooked Mile.

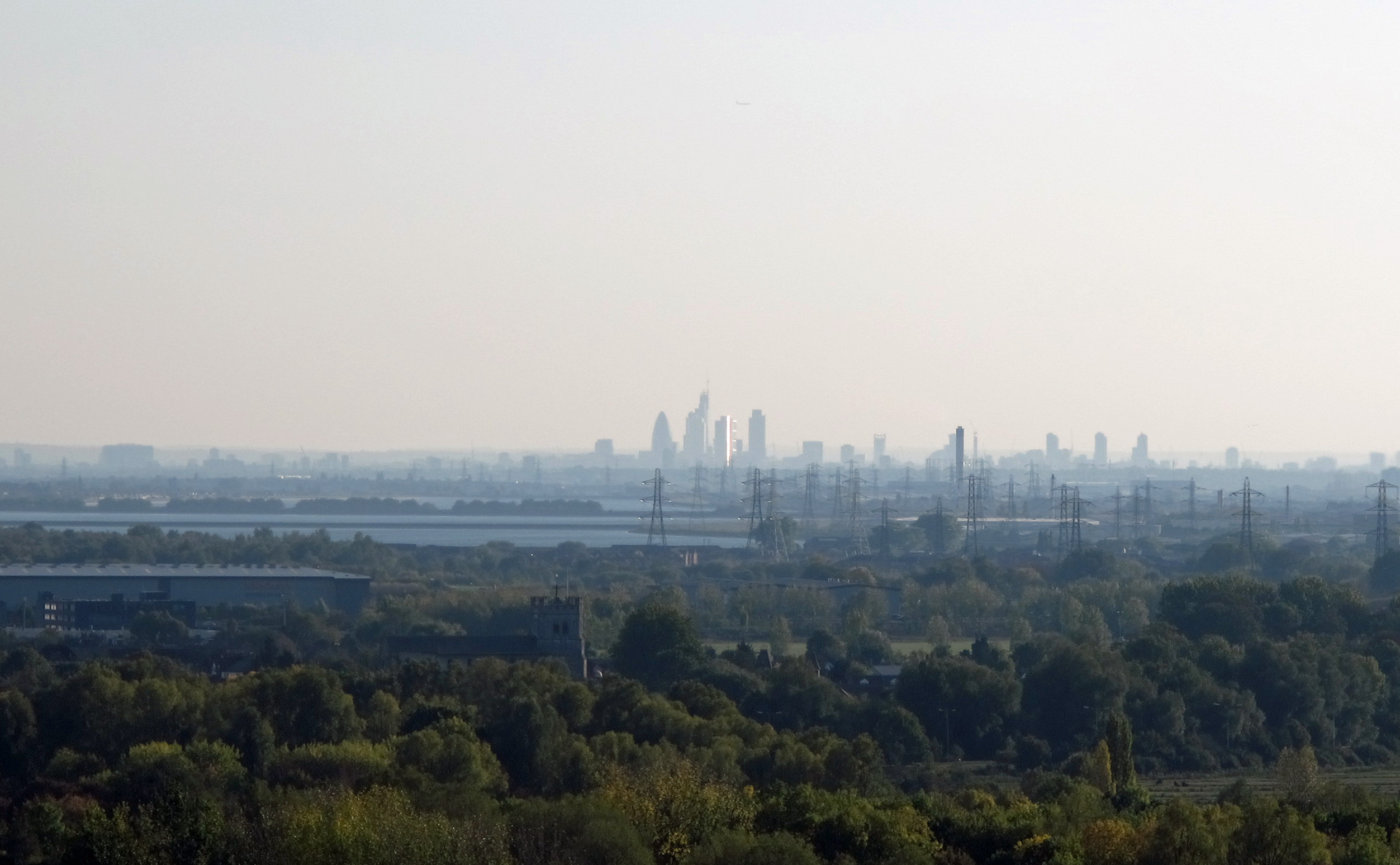
View of the City of London skyline from Monkhams Hill

Holyfield, which is north of Waltham Abbey, consists of approximately 11 homes and farms and is mostly on the western slopes of Monkham's Hill, near the top of which is situated Monkham's Hall. Seven buildings in the hamlet are architecturally listed. In the west are plant nurseries above lakes of the River Lea, and an arboretum and tree nursery separate the hamlet from the town to the south. It is located at grid reference grid reference TL385035.

Aimes Green is a hamlet near Holyfield, north of Waltham Abbey, and is located at grid reference grid reference TL3902.

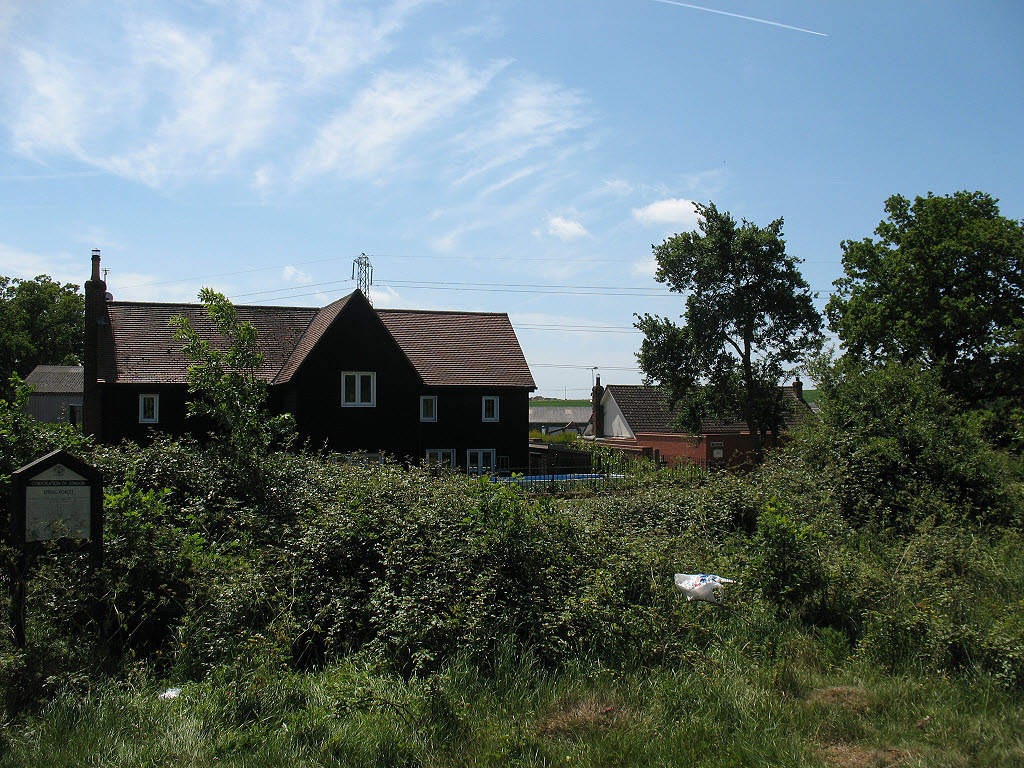
Houses at Aimes Green - geograph.org.uk - 2430871.jpg

Copthall Green is a hamlet located near Upshire.

Wood Green is a hamlet located near Upshire.

=== Watercourses ===
Over the centuries many channels have been dug to divide the River Lea and drain the westernmost land. These channels flow southward across Cheshunt Marsh and part of Waltham Abbey parish;

- Cornmill Stream
- Old River Lea
- Millhead Stream
- River Lee Flood Relief Channel, the southern distributary of the Old River Lea and Horsemill Stream
- River Lee Navigation
- Small River Lea

==== Tributaries of the Lea River System ====
- Cobbins Brook flows through the town from the east and northeast.

== Demography ==
As of the 2021 census, the population of Waltham Abbey was 22,859, an increase from 21,149 in 2011. The majority of the population (82%) resides in the main built-up area, which had a 2021 population of 18,647. The 2021 census showed that 74.6% of the civil parish population identified as White British. 63.8% of the civil parish population was Christian at the 2011 census, with 25.3% declaring themselves irreligious. Minority religious groups include the Muslim and Jewish populations, forming 1.7 and 1.1 percent of the population respectively.

Waltham Abbey
Ethnic Group	1991		2001		2011		2021	
Ethnic Group	Number	%	Number	%	Number	%	Number	%
White: Total	18,028	98.1%	19,536	95.8%	19,316	91.3%	19,009	83.2%
White: English/Welsh/Scottish/Northern Irish/British	–	–	18,742	91.9%	18,115	85.7%	17,060	74.6%
White: Irish	–	–	266	1.3%	247	1.2%	276	1.2%
White: Gypsy or Irish Traveller	–	–	–	–	36	0.2%	21	0.1%
White: Romani	–	–	–	–	–	–	34	0.1%
White: Other	–	–	528	2.6%	918	4.3%	1,618	7.1%
Asian: Total	109	0.6%	249	1.2%	448	2.1%	810	3.5%
Asian or Asian British: Indian	64	0.3%	159	0.8%	174	0.8%	315	1.4%
Asian or Asian British: Pakistani	6	0%	19	0.1%	70	0.3%	170	0.7%
Asian or Asian British: Bangladeshi	1	0%	0	0%	23	0.1%	46	0.2%
Asian or Asian British: Chinese	18	0.1%	46	0.2%	68	0.3%	56	0.2%
Asian or Asian British: Other Asian	20	0.1%	25	0.1%	113	0.5%	223	1%
Black: Total	156	0.8%	328	1.6%	732	3.5%	1,327	5.8%
Black or Black British: African	9	0%	87	0.4%	295	1.4%	605	2.6%
Black or Black British: Caribbean	93	0.5%	213	1%	363	1.7%	522	2.3%
Black or Black British: Other Black	54	0.3%	28	0.1%	74	0.3%	200	0.9%
Mixed: Total	–	–	236	1.2%	528	2.5%	1,008	4.4%
Mixed: White and Black Caribbean	–	–	113	0.6%	237	1.1%	384	1.7%
Mixed: White and Black African	–	–	25	0.1%	46	0.2%	138	0.6%
Mixed: White and Asian	–	–	57	0.3%	129	0.6%	165	0.7%
Mixed: Other Mixed	–	–	41	0.2%	116	0.5%	321	1.4%
Other: Total	83	0.5%	39	0.2%	125	0.6%	705	3.1%
Other: Arab	–	–	–	–	23	0.1%	63	0.3%
Other: Any other ethnic group	83	0.5%	39	0.2%	102	0.5%	642	2.8%
Total	18,376	100%	20,388	100%	21,149	100%	22,859	100%

== Landmarks ==
=== Abbey Church ===
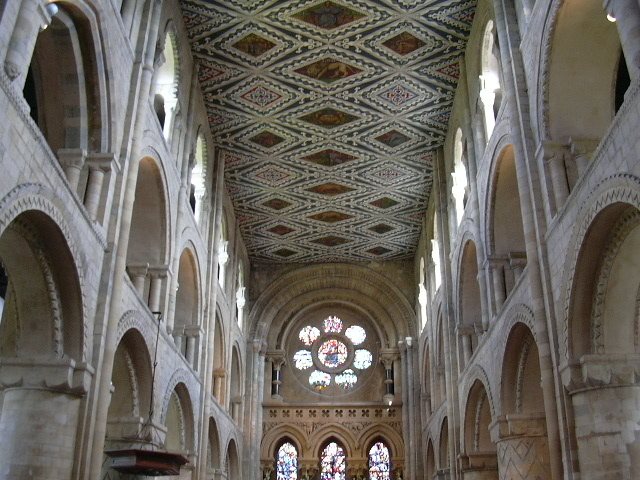
The nave of Waltham Abbey

The medieval Waltham Abbey Church was kept as it was close to a town and is still used as a parish church. In addition there are other remains of the former abbey – the Grade II*listed Midnight Chapel, the gatehouse, a vaulted passage and Harold's Bridge – all in the care of English Heritage. These grounds are notable for the reputed grave of Harold II or "Harold Godwinson", the last Anglo-Saxon King of England.

=== Local museum ===
Housed in a building dating back to 1520 is the Epping Forest District Museum, which tells the story of the people who have lived and worked in this part of south Essex from the earliest times to the present.

=== Royal Gunpowder Mills ===
On the site of a former gunpowder factory another museum illustrates the evolution of explosives and the development of the Royal Gunpowder Mills (an Anchor Point of ERIH, The European Route of Industrial Heritage) through interactive and traditional exhibitions and displays. The site hosts living history and battle re-enactment events most summer weekends and also offers a self-guided nature walk that shows visitors the ecology that has reclaimed much of the remaining 175 acres (0.71 km^{2}).

=== Architecturally notable buildings ===
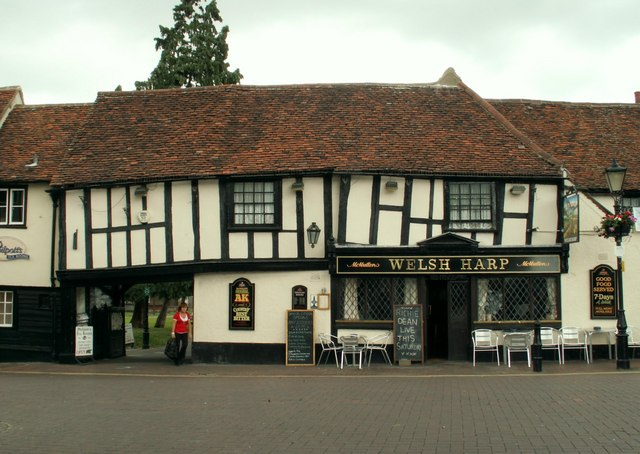
The Welsh Harp Inn

- The Welsh Harp in the Market Square is a half-timbered inn, mostly dating from the 15th century. The Lychgate passage beside the inn leads to the churchyard.
- A former inn, at the corner of Sun Street and the Market Square, is now a barbers. A carved wooden bracket in the form of a hermaphrodite holding a jug supports the projecting upper storey.
- Waltham Abbey Town Hall in Highbridge Street, dating from 1904, is a fine and rare example of an Art Nouveau public building.
- Two notable 18th-century buildings are Essex House in Sewardstone Street and St. Kilda's in Highbridge Street.
- At Upshire is a group of cottages known as the Blue Row. They are weatherboarded and with bark still visible on the roof.

=== Regional park ===
The former gravel pits in the Lea Valley and parts of the former Abbey Gardens are now in the care of the Lee Valley Regional Park Authority for recreational use and nature conservation.

=== Tourism Centre ===
The Epping Forest Conservation Centre in High Beach provides information, maps, books, cards, displays and advice for visitors to the area.

== Transport ==
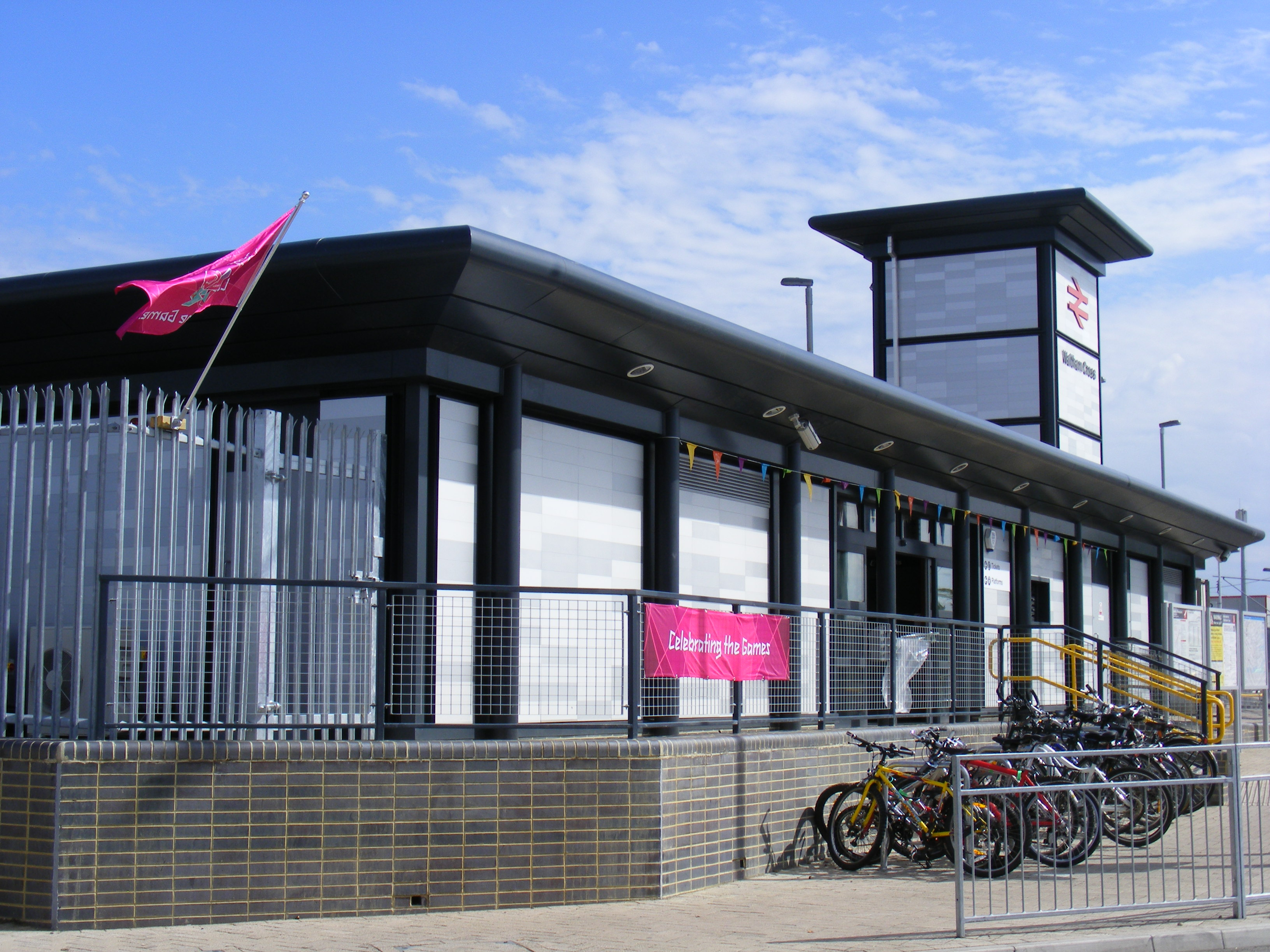
Waltham Cross station during the London 2012 Olympic Games

=== Rail and tube ===
The nearest mainline station is Waltham Cross, on the Lea Valley lines.

Situated in London fare zone 7, it is around 25 minutes from London Liverpool Street and 20 minutes from Stratford. The station is planned for inclusion on Crossrail 2.

The station is a mile from Waltham Abbey town centre, in neighbouring Waltham Cross. It opened in 1840 as "Waltham" and was named "Waltham Cross and Abbey" in 1894, but reverted to "Waltham Cross" in 1969.

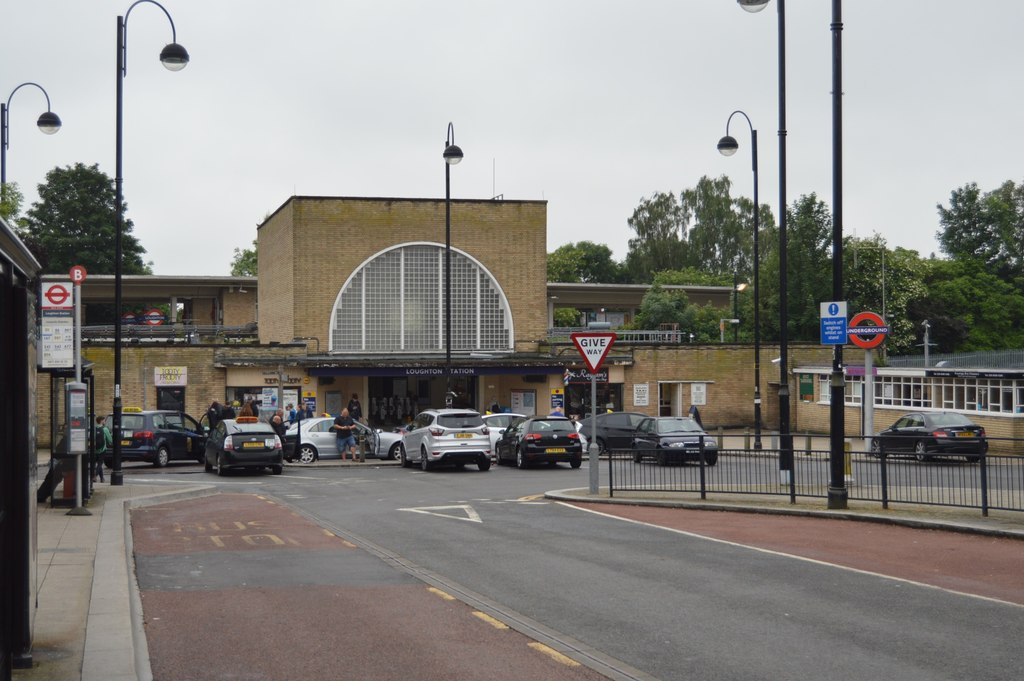
Loughton, on the Central line, is the nearest London Underground station.

The nearest London Underground station is Loughton (in zone 6), on the Central line.

Other nearby railway stations include Chingford (in zone 5) and Cheshunt (in zone 8), also on the Lea Valley lines.

=== Buses ===
Local bus services were historically operated by London Buses, but are now run by various commercial operators. In 2024, the London Assembly agreed a motion calling on Transport for London to restore service between Waltham Abbey and neighbouring Chingford.

Several local routes provide services to Cheshunt, Epping, Harlow, Loughton, and Waltham Cross, with operators including Arriva Herts & Essex and Central Connect.

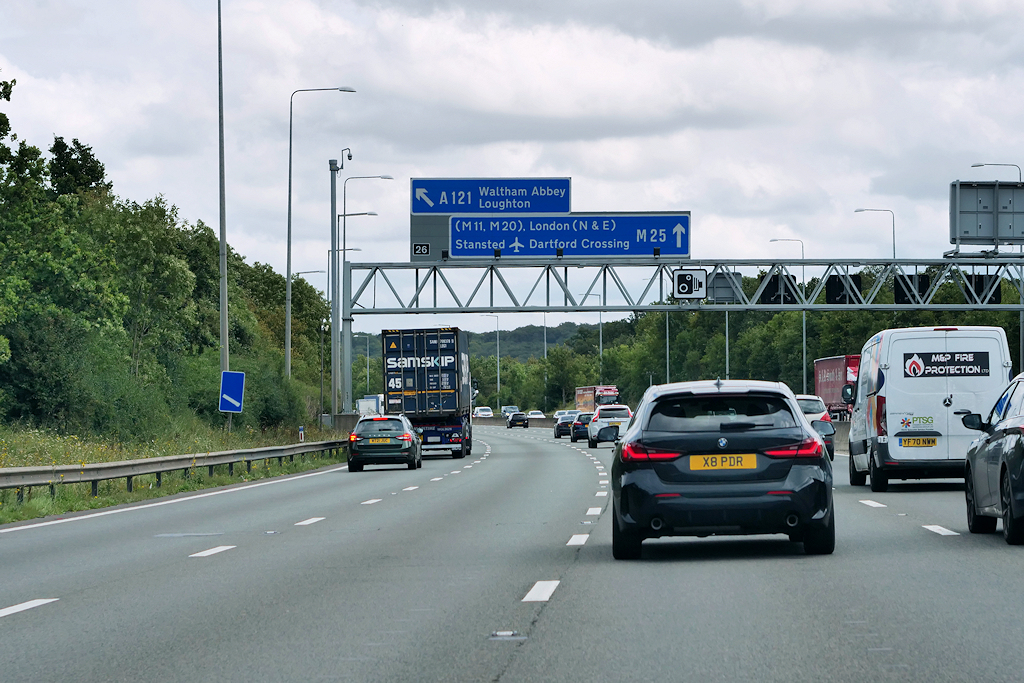
Junction 26 of the M25 at Waltham Abbey

=== Road ===
The M25 London Orbital motorway runs through the town, with the interchange for Junction 26 at Waltham Abbey. The main roads running through the town are the A112 and A121.

== Religion ==
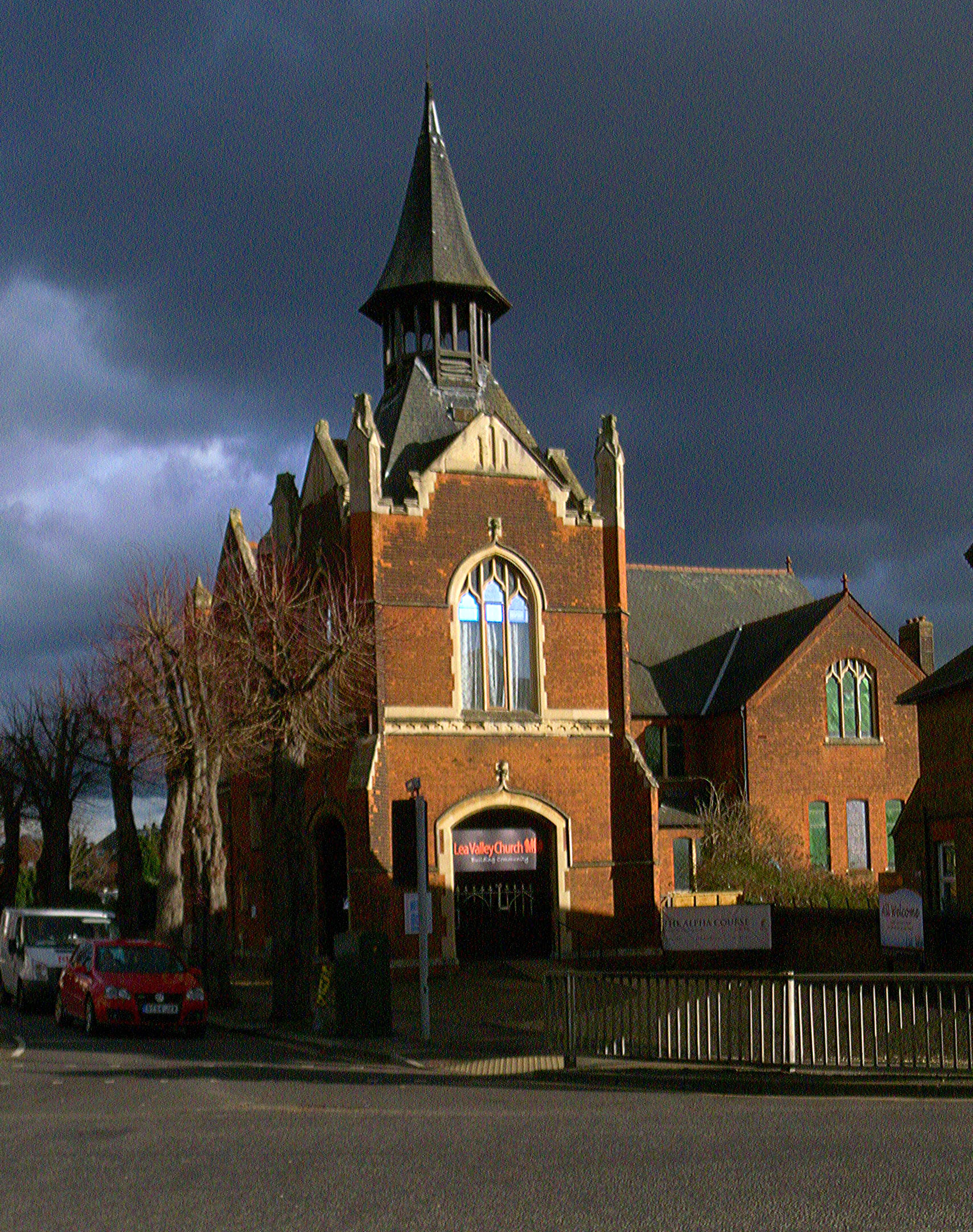
The Grade II-listed Edwardian former Catholic church

The Anglican abbey church is dedicated to St Lawrence. The town has long had a Catholic church. For some decades this was in a former Methodist chapel, an irregularly shaped Edwardian building of stone-dressed red brick with a roof of Welsh slate tiles in free late gothic style with a belfry. In 2008 the congregation moved to a more modern building, and sold the former building to an Evangelical Free church.

== Sport ==
Waltham Abbey has one senior non-League football club, Waltham Abbey F.C. which plays at Capershotts.

Waltham Abbey is also home to the Essex Arrows Baseball Club, founded in 1981 and later affiliated to the British Baseball Federation.

== Notable people ==
- Sir William Wilkinson Addison (1905–1992), historian, chaired the Waltham Abbey Historical Society
- Sir John Anderson (1814–1886), engineer and inventor, worked at the Royal Gunpowder Mills and Royal Small Arms Factory
- William St Julien Arabin (1773–1841), lawyer and judge, served as Judge-Advocate-General of the Army and Deputy Recorder of the City of London, died at High Beech
- George Askwith, 1st Baron Askwith (1861–1942), lawyer, civil servant and industrial arbitrator
- Harriadnie Beau (born 1993), fashion model and brand ambassador
- Queen Anne Boleyn (c.1501/07–1536), second wife of King Henry VIII, stayed at Waltham Abbey with Henry during their summer progress of 1532, and is believed to have visited Henry's house or lodge at Romeland whilst he was still married to Catherine of Aragon
- Charles Booth Brackenbury (1831–1890), British major general and military correspondent, superintendent of the Royal Gunpowder Mills
- Henry Bridges (1697–1754), clockmaker, builder of the Microcosm
- Mark Bristow MBE (born 1962), paralympic cyclist
- John de Burgh (1286–1313), Irish noble
- Lady Victoria Buxton (1839–1916), philanthropist
- Lieutenant-Colonel John By (1779–1836), military engineer, founder of the Canadian capital Bytown (now Ottawa), served as Commanding Royal Engineer of the Royal Gunpowder Mills
- Mel Calman (1931–1994), cartoonist, buried in Waltham Abbey
- Major-General Sir Havelock Charles (1858–1934), medical doctor and Serjeant Surgeon to King George V
- Aubrey Cleall (1898–1982), Anglican clergyman, vicar of Waltham Abbey from 1929 until 1959
- John Coleman (born 1935), greyhound trainer, based for most of his career at the Claverhambury Kennels in Waltham Abbey
- Brigadier-General Sir Richard Colvin (1856–1936), British Army officer and Member of Parliament for Epping
- Lieutenant General Sir William Congreve, 1st Baronet (1742–1814), British military officer, comptroller of the Royal Gunpowder Mills at Waltham Abbey and Faversham
- Sir William Congreve, 2nd Baronet (1772–1828), British Army officer, Tory politician, publisher and inventor, developed the Congreve rockets at Waltham Abbey during the Napoleonic Wars
- Archibald Corble (1883–1944), fencer
- John Crakehall (died 1260), clergyman and Treasurer of England from 1258 to 1260, buried at Waltham Abbey
- William Hayman Cummings (1831–1915), musician, tenor and organist at Waltham Abbey Church
- Thomas Dangerfield (c.1650–1685), conspirator, born in Waltham Abbey
- Dick Darby (1919–1993), bishop, served as vicar of Waltham Abbey
- Edward Denny, 1st Earl of Norwich (1569–1637), courtier, Member of Parliament for Essex, and peer, built Abbey House on the site of Waltham Abbey, the lands of which had been in the family for several generations
- Sir Edward Denny (1547–1600), soldier, privateer and adventurer during the reign of Queen Elizabeth I, buried at the churchyard of Waltham Abbey, in which church survives his monument with the recumbent effigies of himself and his wife
- Honora Denny (died 1614), courtier, daughter of Edward, Lord Denny, buried at Waltham Abbey
- John de Derlington (died 1284), Dominican friar, Archbishop of Dublin, consecrated at Waltham Abbey
- Lawrence of Durham (c.1110–1154), poet and prior, was born at Waltham
- King Edward I (1239–1307), King of England from 1272 to 1307, lay in state at Waltham Abbey
- Captain Arthur Noel Edwards (1883–1915), polo player
- Guy Edwards (1881–1962), cricketer
- Elizabeth of Rhuddlan (1282–1316), daughter of Edward I of England and Eleanor of Castile, interred at Waltham Abbey with her infant daughter and other members of the de Bohun family
- Thomas Fuller (1608–1661), churchman and historian
- John Foxe (1516/17–1587), author of Foxe's Book of Martyrs, lived in a street now called Foxes Parade. The book was hung in chains on a pillar in Waltham Abbey Church
- Samuel Foxe (1560–1630), diarist and politician, son of John Foxe, lived at Warlies and was buried at Waltham Abbey
- Sir George Gardiner (1935–2002), Conservative and Referendum Party Member of Parliament for Reigate
- Ernie Gaskin (1933–2020), greyhound trainer
- Jade Goody (1981–2009), media personality, died in Upshire
- Ben Green (born 1998), racing driver
- Alf Hagon (born 1931), former motorcycle speedway racer, lives in Waltham Abbey
- Sam Hagon (born 2004), motorcycle speedway racer and current British under-21 champion, born in Waltham Abbey
- George Hall (c. 1613–1668), bishop of Chester, born at Waltham Abbey
- King Harold II (1022–1066), the last Anglo-Saxon English king, rebuilt and refounded the abbey, and is believed to have been buried there following his death at the Battle of Hastings
- James Harrington (1664–1693), lawyer and poet
- Sir George Hay, 2nd Earl of Kinnoull (1596–1644), Scottish peer and military officer, buried at Waltham Abbey
- King Henry VIII (1491–1547), King of England from 1509 to 1547, was a frequent visitor, and had a house or lodge at Romeland, to which he would travel from his palace at Greenwich in his barge up the River Lea, paying to maintain the bridges he would pass beneath
- Adam Jackson (1929–1989), greyhound trainer, trained out of the Claverhambury Kennels in Waltham Abbey
- Charles Frewen Jenkin CBE (1865–1940), engineer and academic, was a mechanical assistant superintendent at the Royal Gunpowder Factory
- Christopher Hollis Johnson CBE (1904–1978), chemist and physicist, served as Director of the Explosives Research and Development Establishment at Waltham Abbey
- Terry Lawrence (1910–1989), cricketer
- Thomas Leverton (c. 1743–1824), architect
- Linda Lewis (1950–2023), singer, songwriter and musician, died in Waltham Abbey
- Albert Monk (1900–1975), Australian trade unionist, born in Waltham Abbey
- Colonel Thomas Moody (1779–1849), Colonial Officer officer and Royal Engineer, was Director of the Royal Gunpowder Manufactory at Waltham Abbey
- Kenny Morris (1957-2026), drummer, songwriter, and visual artist, formerly of Siouxsie and the Banshees
- Colonel Sir Frederic Nathan (1861–1933), chemical engineer, served as Superintendent of the Royal Gunpowder Factory
- Hugh de Neville (died 1234), Chief Forester under kings Richard I, John and Henry III and sheriff of several counties (including Essex), buried at Waltham Abbey
- Stuart Nicholson (born 1975), organist, formerly organist and director of music for Waltham Abbey Church
- Major-general William Henry Noble (1834–1892), superintendent of Waltham Abbey Royal Gunpowder Factory, died at Thrift Hall, Waltham Abbey
- Connor Ogilvie (born 1996), footballer, was born in Waltham Abbey, currently playing for Portsmouth in League One, England's 3rd tier of football
- George Palmer (1772–1853), businessman and politician, Member of Parliament for South Essex
- George Palmer (1799–1883), lieutenant colonel in the Essex Yeomanry and South Australian Colonisation Commissioner
- Peter Pellandine (1927–2012), car designer and manufacturer
- Fiona Pennie (born 1982), Olympic slalom canoeist, lives in Waltham Abbey
- Sir Alf Ramsey (1920–1999), football player and manager
- David Rappaport (1951–1990), actor, buried in Waltham Abbey
- Thomas Reeve (1594–1672), Anglican divine
- Sir Robert Robertson (1869–1949), served as the Government Chemist, first person to establish that two types of natural diamond existed, served as an analyst at the Royal Gunpowder Factory
- Mary Sackville, Countess of Dorset (1669–1691), one of the Hampton Court Beauties, Lady of the Bedchamber to Queen Mary II
- Roy Shaw (1936–2012), author, businessman and former East End gangster, lived in the area
- Teddy Sheringham (born 1966), former football player and manager, lives in the area
- W. E. Shewell-Cooper (1900–1982), organic gardener and pioneer of no-dig gardening, was born in Waltham Abbey
- Kate Silverton (born 1970), journalist and BBC News presenter, was born and raised in Waltham Abbey
- Jonathan Smith (born 1955), priest, served as an assistant curate at Waltham Abbey Church
- Thomas Tallis (c. 1505–1585), composer of High Renaissance music, served at Waltham Abbey
- Alfred, Lord Tennyson (1809–1892), Poet Laureate to Queen Victoria, lived at Beech Hill Park, High Beech
- Tovi the Proud (fl. 1018–1043), 11th-century Danish thegn and staller to King Cnut
- William Twaits (1781–1814), singer, dancer, and actor-manager, started his career in Waltham Abbey
- Terry Venables (1943–2023), football player and manager, owned a bar in Sewardstone Road named 'Freddie's', formerly the Royal Oak pub run by his father Fred Venables
- Mabel Clarisse Warburton MBE (1879–1961), Christian missionary and educationalist, died in Waltham Abbey
- Tony West (born 1972), darts player
- Luke Williams (born 1981), football manager, head coach of EFL League one club Peterborough United
- Thomas Willingale (1799–1870), instrumental in the preservation of Epping Forest, was prosecuted at Waltham Abbey
- Leonard Albert Wiseman OBE (1915–2006), organic chemist, scientific intelligence analyst and scientific administrator, served as Deputy Director of the Explosives Research and Development Establishment at Waltham Abbey
- Dean Wolstenholme Sr. (1757–1837), painter, lived in Waltham Abbey
- Francesco Zambeccari (1752–1812), aviation pioneer, launched the first unmanned balloon in Britain in 1783 from Cheapside, which landed in Waltham Abbey

== Coat of arms ==
Coat of arms of Waltham Abbey
Notes Granted 9 November 1956, to the Waltham Holy Cross Urban District Council. Transferred to Waltham Abbey Town Council in 1974. Crest Out of a Coronet composed of six Fleurs-de-Lys set upon a Rim Or a demi-Stag at gaze proper charged on the shoulder with a Fountain and holding in the mouth a Seaxe the blade Argent the hilt and pommel Or mantled Gules doubled Argent. Escutcheon Argent on a Cross engrailed Sable a Lion's Face between four Crosses bottonnée Or. Motto Sanctae Nomine Crucis
