= List of United Kingdom locations: Sb-Sf =

The United Kingdom

This is part of the list of United Kingdom locations: a gazetteer of place names in the United Kingdom showing each place's locality and geographical coordinates.

== Sc ==
=== Sca-Sch ===
Location	Locality	Coordinates (links to map & photo sources)	OS grid reference
Scackleton	North Yorkshire	54.14°N 01.02°W	SE6472
Scadabhagh	Western Isles	57.82°N 06.76°W	NG1792
Scaftworth	Nottinghamshire	53.41°N 01.00°W	SK6691
Scagglethorpe	North Yorkshire	54.13°N 00.73°W	SE8372
Scaitcliffe	Lancashire	53.74°N 02.38°W	SD7528
Scalasaig	Argyll and Bute	56.06°N 06.19°W	NR3994
Scalby	East Riding of Yorkshire	53.75°N 00.74°W	SE8329
Scalby	North Yorkshire	54.29°N 00.44°W	TA0190
Scald End	Bedfordshire	52.20°N 00.47°W	TL0457
Scaldwell	Northamptonshire	52.34°N 00.88°W	SP7672
Scaleby	Cumbria	54.95°N 02.87°W	NY4463
Scalebyhill	Cumbria	54.95°N 02.87°W	NY4463
Scale Hall	Lancashire	54.05°N 02.82°W	SD4662
Scales (near Kirkoswald)	Cumbria	54.77°N 02.66°W	NY5742
Scales (near Threlkeld)	Cumbria	54.62°N 03.02°W	NY3426
Scales (South Lakeland)	Cumbria	54.13°N 03.11°W	SD2772
Scalford	Leicestershire	52.80°N 00.87°W	SK7624
Scaling	Redcar and Cleveland	54.50°N 00.85°W	NZ7413
Scalloway	Shetland Islands	60.13°N 01.28°W	HU4039
Scalpay	Highland	57.29°N 05.95°W	NG621297
Scalpay	Western Isles	57.87°N 06.68°W	NG221966
Scamblesby	Lincolnshire	53.28°N 00.09°W	TF2778
Scamland	East Riding of Yorkshire	53.87°N 00.84°W	SE7643
Scamodale	Highland	56.79°N 05.55°W	NM8373
Scampston	North Yorkshire	54.16°N 00.68°W	SE8675
Scampton	Lincolnshire	53.30°N 00.59°W	SK9479
Scapegoat Hill	Kirklees	53.64°N 01.88°W	SE0816
Scarastabeg / Sgarasta Bheag	Western Isles	57.81°N 07.05°W	NG0092
Scarastavore / Sgarasta MhÃ²r	Western Isles	57.81°N 07.05°W	NG0092
Scarba	Argyll and Bute	56.17°N 05.70°W	NM699044
Scarborough	North Yorkshire	54.27°N 00.41°W	TA0388
Scarcewater	Cornwall	50.34°N 04.93°W	SW9154
Scarcliffe	Derbyshire	53.20°N 01.26°W	SK4968
Scarcroft	Leeds	53.86°N 01.46°W	SE3541
Scarfskerry	Highland	58.64°N 03.27°W	ND2674
Scargill	Durham	54.48°N 01.92°W	NZ0510
Scarinish	Argyll and Bute	56.49°N 06.81°W	NM0444
Scarisbrick	Lancashire	53.61°N 02.95°W	SD3713
Scarness	Cumbria	54.65°N 03.21°W	NY2230
Scarning	Norfolk	52.67°N 00.88°E	TF9512
Scarp	Western Isles	58.02°N 07.14°W	NA961150
Scarr Head	Cumbria	54.33°N 03.10°W	SD2894
Scarrington	Nottinghamshire	52.96°N 00.91°W	SK7341
Scarth Hill	Lancashire	53.54°N 02.87°W	SD4206
Scarthingwell	North Yorkshire	53.82°N 01.25°W	SE4937
Scartho	North East Lincolnshire	53.53°N 00.10°W	TA2606
Scarvister	Shetland Islands	60.16°N 01.46°W	HU3042
Scarwell	Orkney Islands	59.06°N 03.34°W	HY2320
Scatness	Shetland Islands	59.87°N 01.32°W	HU3810
Scatsta	Shetland Islands	60.43°N 01.29°W	HU3972
Scaur	Dumfries and Galloway	54.86°N 03.82°W	NX8354
Scawby	North Lincolnshire	53.53°N 00.55°W	SE9605
Scawsby	Doncaster	53.53°N 01.18°W	SE5404
Scawthorpe	Doncaster	53.53°N 01.17°W	SE5505
Scawton	North Yorkshire	54.24°N 01.17°W	SE5483
Scaynes Hill	West Sussex	50.99°N 00.06°W	TQ3623
Scethrog	Powys	51.91°N 03.31°W	SO1025
Scholar Green	Cheshire	53.11°N 02.25°W	SJ8357
Scholemoor	Bradford	53.78°N 01.80°W	SE1332
Scholes	Bradford	53.82°N 01.98°W	SE0137
Scholes	Calderdale	53.72°N 01.75°W	SE1625
Scholes	Kirklees	53.55°N 01.75°W	SE1607
Scholes	Leeds	53.82°N 01.43°W	SE3737
Scholes	Rotherham	53.45°N 01.41°W	SK3995
Scholes	Wigan	53.54°N 02.63°W	SD5805
Scholey Hill	Wakefield	53.72°N 01.44°W	SE3725
School Aycliffe	Darlington	54.60°N 01.61°W	NZ2523
School Green	Bradford	53.79°N 01.83°W	SE1133
School Green	Cheshire	53.17°N 02.54°W	SJ6464
School Green	Essex	51.95°N 00.51°E	TL7331
School Green	Isle of Wight	50.67°N 01.53°W	SZ3386
Schoolgreen	Berkshire	51.39°N 00.95°W	SU7367
School House	Dorset	50.81°N 02.90°W	ST3602

=== Sci-Scu ===
Location	Locality	Coordinates (links to map & photo sources)	OS grid reference
Scilly Bank	Cumbria	54.55°N 03.56°W	NX9919
Scissett	Kirklees	53.58°N 01.63°W	SE2410
Scleddau	Pembrokeshire	51.96°N 05.00°W	SM9434
Scofton	Nottinghamshire	53.31°N 01.07°W	SK6280
Scole	Norfolk	52.36°N 01.15°E	TM1579
Scole Common	Norfolk	52.37°N 01.14°E	TM1480
Sconser	Highland	57.30°N 06.13°W	NG5131
Scoonie	Fife	56.19°N 03.00°W	NO3801
Scoonieburn	Perth and Kinross	56.37°N 03.42°W	NO1221
Scopwick	Lincolnshire	53.10°N 00.40°W	TF0758
Scoraig	Highland	57.90°N 05.37°W	NH0096
Scorborough	East Riding of Yorkshire	53.89°N 00.46°W	TA0145
Score Head	Shetland Islands	60.19°N 01.07°W	HU514454
Scorrier	Cornwall	50.25°N 05.20°W	SW7244
Scorriton	Devon	50.49°N 03.83°W	SX7068
Scorton	Lancashire	53.92°N 02.76°W	SD5048
Scorton	North Yorkshire	54.39°N 01.61°W	NZ2500
Sco Ruston	Norfolk	52.73°N 01.37°E	TG2821
Scotasay	Western Isles	57.87°N 06.75°W	NG185972
Scotbheinn	Western Isles	57.48°N 07.24°W	NF8656
Scotby	Cumbria	54.87°N 02.87°W	NY4454
Scotches	Derbyshire	53.02°N 01.49°W	SK3448
Scotforth	Lancashire	54.03°N 02.80°W	SD4859
Scotgate	Kirklees	53.59°N 01.82°W	SE1211
Scot Hay	Staffordshire	53.02°N 02.29°W	SJ8047
Scothern	Lincolnshire	53.28°N 00.45°W	TF0377
Scotland	Berkshire	51.41°N 01.19°W	SU5669
Scotland (Leicester)	Leicestershire	52.57°N 00.99°W	SP6898
Scotland (Burton upon Trent)	Leicestershire	52.79°N 01.43°W	SK3822
Scotland	Lincolnshire	52.85°N 00.51°W	TF0030
Scotland End	Oxfordshire	51.99°N 01.50°W	SP3433
Scotland Gate	Northumberland	55.15°N 01.60°W	NZ2584
Scotlands	Wolverhampton	52.60°N 02.10°W	SJ9301
Scotland Street	Suffolk	51.98°N 00.89°E	TL9936
Scotlandwell	Perth and Kinross	56.19°N 03.32°W	NO1801
Scot Lane End	Wigan	53.57°N 02.57°W	SD6209
Scots' Gap	Northumberland	55.16°N 01.93°W	NZ0486
Scotston	Aberdeenshire	56.84°N 02.44°W	NO7373
Scotstoun	City of Glasgow	55.88°N 04.36°W	NS5268
Scotstown	Highland	56.70°N 05.57°W	NM8163
Scotswood	Newcastle upon Tyne	54.97°N 01.68°W	NZ2064
Scotswood	Surrey	51.38°N 00.65°W	SU9466
Scottas	Highland	57.03°N 05.72°W	NG7400
Scotter	Lincolnshire	53.48°N 00.67°W	SE8800
Scotterthorpe	Lincolnshire	53.50°N 00.68°W	SE8702
Scotton	Lincolnshire	53.48°N 00.67°W	SK8899
Scotton (Harrogate)	North Yorkshire	54.02°N 01.51°W	SE3259
Scotton (Richmondshire)	North Yorkshire	54.35°N 01.72°W	SE1896
Scottow	Norfolk	52.75°N 01.37°E	TG2823
Scott Willoughby	Lincolnshire	52.92°N 00.43°W	TF0537
Scoulton	Norfolk	52.56°N 00.92°E	TF9800
Scounslow Green	Staffordshire	52.85°N 01.86°W	SK0929
Scourie	Highland	58.34°N 05.16°W	NC1544
Scousburgh	Shetland Islands	59.93°N 01.33°W	HU3717
Scout Dike	Barnsley	53.53°N 01.65°W	SE2304
Scout Green	Cumbria	54.45°N 02.63°W	NY5907
Scouthead	Oldham	53.54°N 02.06°W	SD9605
Scowles	Gloucestershire	51.78°N 02.63°W	SO5610
Scrabster	Highland	58.60°N 03.56°W	ND0970
Scraesburgh	Scottish Borders	55.45°N 02.52°W	NT6718
Scrafield	Lincolnshire	53.19°N 00.05°W	TF3068
Scragged Oak	Kent	51.31°N 00.58°E	TQ8061
Scrainwood	Northumberland	55.37°N 02.01°W	NT9909
Scrane End	Lincolnshire	52.94°N 00.05°E	TF3841
Scrapsgate	Kent	51.43°N 00.78°E	TQ9474
Scraptoft	City of Leicester	52.63°N 01.05°W	SK6405
Scrapton	Somerset	50.88°N 03.01°W	ST2910
Scratby	Norfolk	52.67°N 01.69°E	TG5015
Scrayingham	North Yorkshire	54.03°N 00.88°W	SE7360
Scredda	Cornwall	50.35°N 04.79°W	SX0154
Scredington	Lincolnshire	52.94°N 00.37°W	TF0940
Screedy	Somerset	51.01°N 03.29°W	ST0925
Scremby	Lincolnshire	53.18°N 00.15°E	TF4467
Scremerston	Northumberland	55.73°N 02.00°W	NU0049
Screveton	Nottinghamshire	52.97°N 00.91°W	SK7343
Scrivelsby	Lincolnshire	53.17°N 00.11°W	TF2666
Scriven	North Yorkshire	54.01°N 01.48°W	SE3458
Scronkey	Lancashire	53.91°N 02.89°W	SD4147
Scrooby	Nottinghamshire	53.40°N 01.02°W	SK6590
Scropton	Derbyshire	52.86°N 01.71°W	SK1930
Scrub Hill	Lincolnshire	53.07°N 00.16°W	TF2355
Scruton	North Yorkshire	54.32°N 01.54°W	SE3092
Scrwgan	Powys	52.79°N 03.21°W	SJ1823
Scuggate	Cumbria	55.05°N 02.87°W	NY4474
Sculcoates	City of Kingston upon Hull	53.75°N 00.34°W	TA0930
Sculthorpe	Norfolk	52.84°N 00.80°E	TF8931
Scunthorpe	North Lincolnshire	53.57°N 00.65°W	SE8910
Scurdie Ness	Angus	56.69°N 02.44°W	NO726562
Scurlage	Swansea	51.56°N 04.22°W	SS4687
Scurrival Point	Western Isles	57.05°N 07.45°W	NF697091

== Se ==
=== Sea ===
Location	Locality	Coordinates (links to map & photo sources)	OS grid reference
Sea	Somerset	50.91°N 02.94°W	ST3413
Seaborough	Dorset	50.85°N 02.82°W	ST4206
Seabridge	Staffordshire	52.98°N 02.25°W	SJ8343
Seabrook	Kent	51.06°N 01.11°E	TR1834
Seaburn	Sunderland	54.92°N 01.37°W	NZ4059
Seacombe	Wirral	53.40°N 03.02°W	SJ3290
Seacox Heath	East Sussex	51.04°N 00.46°E	TQ7330
Seacroft	Leeds	53.81°N 01.46°W	SE3536
Seacroft	Lincolnshire	53.11°N 00.32°E	TF5660
Seadyke	Lincolnshire	52.90°N 00.03°W	TF3236
Seafar	North Lanarkshire	55.94°N 04.00°W	NS7574
Seafield	City of Aberdeen	57.12°N 02.15°W	NJ9104
Seafield	Midlothian	55.86°N 03.20°W	NT2564
Seafield	Shetland Islands	60.60°N 01.07°W	HU5192
Seafield	South Ayrshire	55.44°N 04.65°W	NS3220
Seafield	West Lothian	55.87°N 03.60°W	NT0066
Seaford	East Sussex	50.77°N 00.09°E	TV4899
Seaforth	Sefton	53.46°N 03.02°W	SJ3297
Seaforth Island	Western Isles	57.99°N 06.73°W	NB206107
Seagrave	Leicestershire	52.74°N 01.09°W	SK6117
Seagry Heath	Wiltshire	51.52°N 02.07°W	ST9581
Seaham	Durham	54.83°N 01.36°W	NZ4149
Seahouses	Northumberland	55.58°N 01.66°W	NU2132
Seal	Kent	51.28°N 00.20°E	TQ5456
Sealand	Flintshire	53.20°N 02.97°W	SJ3568
Seale	Surrey	51.21°N 00.72°W	SU8947
Seal Skerry	Orkney Islands	59.40°N 02.38°W	HY781571
Seamer (Scarborough)	North Yorkshire	54.23°N 00.45°W	TA0183
Seamer (Hambleton)	North Yorkshire	54.48°N 01.24°W	NZ4910
Seamill	North Ayrshire	55.68°N 04.86°W	NS2047
Sea Mill	Cumbria	54.11°N 03.11°W	SD2769
Sea Mills	City of Bristol	51.48°N 02.64°W	ST5576
Sea Mills	Cornwall	50.51°N 04.93°W	SW9273
Seannabhailer	Western Isles	57.50°N 07.24°W	NF860578
Sea Palling	Norfolk	52.77°N 01.58°E	TG4226
Searby	North Lincolnshire	53.53°N 00.38°W	TA0705
Seasalter	Kent	51.34°N 00.99°E	TR0965
Seascale	Cumbria	54.39°N 03.49°W	NY0301
Seaside	Perth and Kinross	56.40°N 03.16°W	NO2824
Seathorne	Lincolnshire	53.15°N 00.34°E	TF5765
Seathwaite (Allerdale)	Cumbria	54.49°N 03.19°W	NY2312
Seathwaite (South Lakeland)	Cumbria	54.35°N 03.20°W	SD2296
Seatle	Cumbria	54.23°N 02.96°W	SD3783
Seatoller	Cumbria	54.50°N 03.17°W	NY2413
Seaton	City of Aberdeen	57.16°N 02.10°W	NJ9408
Seaton	Cornwall	50.36°N 04.39°W	SX3054
Seaton	Cumbria	54.65°N 03.53°W	NY0130
Seaton	Devon	50.70°N 03.07°W	SY2490
Seaton	Durham	54.83°N 01.39°W	NZ3949
Seaton	East Riding of Yorkshire	53.90°N 00.23°W	TA1646
Seaton	Kent	51.27°N 01.18°E	TR2258
Seaton	Northumberland	55.07°N 01.50°W	NZ3276
Seaton	Rutland	52.57°N 00.67°W	SP9098
Seaton Burn	Newcastle upon Tyne	55.06°N 01.64°W	NZ2374
Seaton Carew	Hartlepool	54.65°N 01.19°W	NZ5229
Seaton Delaval	Northumberland	55.06°N 01.53°W	NZ3075
Seaton Junction	Devon	50.75°N 03.07°W	SY2496
Seaton Ross	East Riding of Yorkshire	53.85°N 00.81°W	SE7841
Seaton Sluice	Northumberland	55.07°N 01.48°W	NZ3376
Seatown	Dorset	50.71°N 02.82°W	SY4291
Seatown (Covesea)	Moray	57.71°N 03.29°W	NJ2370
Seatown (Buckpool)	Moray	57.67°N 02.97°W	NJ4265
Seaureaugh Moor	Cornwall	50.18°N 05.18°W	SW7337
Seave Green	North Yorkshire	54.39°N 01.13°W	NZ5600
Seaview	Isle of Wight	50.71°N 01.12°W	SZ6291
Seaville	Cumbria	54.86°N 03.31°W	NY1653
Seavington St Mary	Somerset	50.92°N 02.86°W	ST3914
Seavington St Michael	Somerset	50.93°N 02.85°W	ST4015
Seawick	Essex	51.77°N 01.07°E	TM1213

=== Seb-Sel ===
Location	Locality	Coordinates (links to map & photo sources)	OS grid reference
Sebastopol	Torfaen	51.67°N 03.04°W	ST2898
Sebergham	Cumbria	54.76°N 03.01°W	NY3541
Seckington	Warwickshire	52.66°N 01.61°W	SK2607
Second Coast	Highland	57.85°N 05.50°W	NG9290
Second Drove	Cambridgeshire	52.45°N 00.25°E	TL5386
Sector	Devon	50.77°N 02.98°W	SY3198
Sedbergh	Cumbria	54.32°N 02.53°W	SD6592
Sedbury	Gloucestershire	51.63°N 02.66°W	ST5493
Sedbusk	North Yorkshire	54.31°N 02.18°W	SD8891
Seddington	Bedfordshire	52.10°N 00.29°W	TL1747
Sedgeberrow	Worcestershire	52.04°N 01.97°W	SP0238
Sedgebrook	Lincolnshire	52.92°N 00.73°W	SK8537
Sedgefield	Durham	54.64°N 01.45°W	NZ3528
Sedgeford	Norfolk	52.89°N 00.54°E	TF7136
Sedgehill	Wiltshire	51.05°N 02.20°W	ST8628
Sedgemere	Solihull	52.37°N 01.67°W	SP2275
Sedgley	Dudley	52.54°N 02.13°W	SO9194
Sedgley Park	Salford	53.51°N 02.27°W	SD8202
Sedgwick	Cumbria	54.27°N 02.75°W	SD5187
Sedlescombe	East Sussex	50.93°N 00.53°E	TQ7818
Sedrup	Buckinghamshire	51.79°N 00.85°W	SP7911
Seed	Kent	51.27°N 00.77°E	TQ9456
Seed Lee	Lancashire	53.71°N 02.63°W	SD5824
Seedley	Salford	53.48°N 02.30°W	SJ8099
Seend	Wiltshire	51.34°N 02.08°W	ST9461
Seend Cleeve	Wiltshire	51.33°N 02.10°W	ST9360
Seend Head	Wiltshire	51.33°N 02.11°W	ST9260
Seer Green	Buckinghamshire	51.60°N 00.61°W	SU9691
Seething	Norfolk	52.52°N 01.40°E	TM3197
Seething Wells	Surrey	51.39°N 00.31°W	TQ1767
Sefster	Shetland Islands	60.23°N 01.46°W	HU3050
Sefton	Merseyside	53.50°N 02.98°W	SD3501
Sefton Park	Liverpool	53.37°N 02.94°W	SJ3787
Seghill	Northumberland	55.06°N 01.56°W	NZ2874
Seifton	Shropshire	52.44°N 02.76°W	SO4883
Seighford	Staffordshire	52.81°N 02.17°W	SJ8824
Seil	Argyll and Bute	56.29°N 05.61°W	NM762172
Seilebost	Western Isles	57.85°N 06.95°W	NG0696
Seion	Gwynedd	53.18°N 04.18°W	SH5467
Seisdon	Staffordshire	52.54°N 02.23°W	SO8494
Seisiadar	Western Isles	58.22°N 06.19°W	NB5434
Selattyn	Shropshire	52.88°N 03.10°W	SJ2633
Selborne	Hampshire	51.09°N 00.94°W	SU7433
Selby	North Yorkshire	53.78°N 01.07°W	SE6132
Selgrove	Kent	51.28°N 00.88°E	TR0158
Selham	West Sussex	50.97°N 00.67°W	SU9320
Selhurst	Croydon	51.38°N 00.10°W	TQ3267
Selkirk	Scottish Borders	55.54°N 02.84°W	NT4728
Sellack	Herefordshire	51.94°N 02.64°W	SO5627
Sellack Boat	Herefordshire	51.94°N 02.64°W	SO5628
Sellafirth	Shetland Islands	60.65°N 01.05°W	HU5297
Sellan	Cornwall	50.11°N 05.61°W	SW4230
Sellibister	Orkney Islands	59.27°N 02.49°W	HY7243
Sellick's Green	Somerset	50.96°N 03.12°W	ST2119
Sellindge	Kent	51.10°N 00.99°E	TR1038
Selling	Kent	51.26°N 00.92°E	TR0456
Sells Green	Wiltshire	51.35°N 02.07°W	ST9562
Selly Hill	North Yorkshire	54.46°N 00.67°W	NZ8609
Selly Oak	Birmingham	52.43°N 01.95°W	SP0382
Selly Park	Birmingham	52.43°N 01.92°W	SP0582
Selmeston	East Sussex	50.84°N 00.14°E	TQ5107
Selsdon	Croydon	51.34°N 00.06°W	TQ3562
Selsey	West Sussex	50.73°N 00.79°W	SZ8593
Selsey Bill	West Sussex	50.72°N 00.77°W	SZ864924
Selside	Cumbria	54.38°N 02.72°W	SD5399
Selside	North Yorkshire	54.17°N 02.33°W	SD7875
Selsley	Gloucestershire	51.72°N 02.24°W	SO8303
Selsmore	Hampshire	50.78°N 00.96°W	SZ7399
Selson	Kent	51.24°N 01.29°E	TR3055
Selsted	Kent	51.15°N 01.15°E	TR2144
Selston	Nottinghamshire	53.07°N 01.31°W	SK4653
Selston Common	Nottinghamshire	53.06°N 01.30°W	SK4752
Selston Green	Nottinghamshire	53.07°N 01.32°W	SK4553
Selworthy	Somerset	51.20°N 03.56°W	SS9146

=== Sem-Sez ===
Location	Locality	Coordinates (links to map & photo sources)	OS grid reference
Semblister	Shetland Islands	60.23°N 01.40°W	HU3350
Semer	Suffolk	52.07°N 00.90°E	TL9946
Sem Hill	Wiltshire	51.03°N 02.17°W	ST8826
Semington	Wiltshire	51.33°N 02.15°W	ST8960
Semley	Wiltshire	51.03°N 02.15°W	ST8926
Sempringham	Lincolnshire	52.88°N 00.35°W	TF1133
Send	Surrey	51.28°N 00.53°W	TQ0255
Send Grove	Surrey	51.27°N 00.55°W	TQ0154
Send Marsh	Surrey	51.28°N 00.52°W	TQ0355
Senghenydd	Caerphilly	51.60°N 03.28°W	ST1190
Sennen	Cornwall	50.06°N 05.70°W	SW3525
Sennen Cove	Cornwall	50.07°N 05.70°W	SW3526
Sennybridge	Powys	51.94°N 03.57°W	SN9228
Serlby	Nottinghamshire	53.39°N 01.05°W	SK6389
Serrington	Wiltshire	51.12°N 01.91°W	SU0636
Sessay	North Yorkshire	54.16°N 01.31°W	SE4575
Setchey	Norfolk	52.69°N 00.41°E	TF6313
Setley	Hampshire	50.79°N 01.57°W	SU3000
Seton	East Lothian	55.95°N 02.94°W	NT4174
Seton Mains	East Lothian	55.96°N 02.93°W	NT4275
Setter	Shetland Islands	60.51°N 01.18°W	HU4581
Settiscarth	Orkney Islands	59.04°N 03.11°W	HY3618
Settle	North Yorkshire	54.06°N 02.29°W	SD8163
Settrington	North Yorkshire	54.11°N 00.73°W	SE8370
Seven Ash	Somerset	51.09°N 03.21°W	ST1533
Sevenhampton	Gloucestershire	51.88°N 01.95°W	SP0321
Sevenhampton	Swindon	51.60°N 01.71°W	SU2090
Seven Kings	Redbridge	51.56°N 00.09°E	TQ4587
Sevenoaks	Kent	51.27°N 00.17°E	TQ5255
Sevenoaks Common	Kent	51.24°N 00.17°E	TQ5252
Sevenoaks Weald	Kent	51.22°N 00.17°E	TQ5250
Seven Sisters	Neath Port Talbot	51.75°N 03.71°W	SN8208
Seven Springs	Gloucestershire	51.85°N 02.05°W	SO9617
Seven Star Green	Essex	51.89°N 00.80°E	TL9325
Severn Beach	South Gloucestershire	51.55°N 02.66°W	ST5484
Severn Stoke	Worcestershire	52.09°N 02.22°W	SO8544
Sevick End	Bedfordshire	52.17°N 00.40°W	TL0954
Sevington	Kent	51.12°N 00.89°E	TR0340
Sewards End	Essex	52.01°N 00.27°E	TL5638
Sewardstone	Essex	51.65°N 00.01°W	TQ3897
Sewardstonebury	Waltham Forest	51.63°N 00.01°E	TQ3995
Sewell	Bedfordshire	51.88°N 00.56°W	SP9922
Sewerby	East Riding of Yorkshire	54.09°N 00.18°W	TA1968
Seworgan	Cornwall	50.13°N 05.22°W	SW7031
Sewstern	Leicestershire	52.77°N 00.69°W	SK8821
Sexhow	North Yorkshire	54.44°N 01.27°W	NZ4706
Sezincote	Gloucestershire	51.96°N 01.75°W	SP1730
