= List of shipwrecks in July 1839 =

The list of shipwrecks in July 1839 includes ships sunk, foundered, wrecked, grounded, or otherwise lost during July 1839.

== 2 July ==
List of shipwrecks: 2 July 1839
Ship	State	Description
Alcide	France	The ship was driven ashore at Algeciras, Spain, where she was subsequently wrecked. She was on a voyage from Marseille, Bouches-du-Rhône to Havre de Grâce, Seine-Inférieure.
Maria	United Kingdom	The brig sprang a leak and sank in the South China Sea west of Borneo. Her twenty passengers and crew took to a boat. They were rescued on 25 July by the schooner Zeemeuw (Netherlands). Maria was on a voyage from the Isle de France to Koepang, Netherlands East Indies.
King William IV	(United Kingdom of Great Britain and Ireland) New South Wales	The steamship was driven ashore and wrecked at Newcastle. All on board were rescued. She was on a voyage from Newcastle to Sydney.

== 3 July ==
List of shipwrecks: 3 July 1839
Ship	State	Description
Townley	United Kingdom	The ship was driven ashore in the Traverse. She was on a voyage from Quebec City, Lower Canada, British North America to New York, United States. Townley was later refloated and put back to Quebec City.

== 4 July ==
List of shipwrecks: 4 July 1839
Ship	State	Description
Silvia	United Kingdom	The ship ran aground on the Burbo Bank, in Liverpool Bay. She was on a voyage from Liverpool, Lancashire to Quebec City, Lower Canada, British North America She was later refloated and put back to Liverpool.

== 5 July ==
List of shipwrecks: 5 July 1839
Ship	State	Description
Brothers	United Kingdom	The ship was driven ashore on Saltholm, Denmark. She was on a voyage from Riga, Russia to London. Brothers was refloated the next day and resumed her voyage.
Grand Turk	United States	The ship was wrecked on Foy's Rock, off the coast of the Florida Territory. Her crew were rescued. She was on a voyage from St. Ubes, Portugal to New Orleans, Louisiana.
Strathmore	United Kingdom	The ship ran aground on Patterson's Rock, off the coast of Argyllshire. She was on a voyage from Liverpool, Lancashire to Saint Petersburg, Russia. Strathmore was refloated and resumed her voyage.

== 6 July ==
List of shipwrecks: July 1839
Ship	State	Description
Abigail	United States	The ship was destroyed by fire at Eastport, Maine.
Laura Eliza	United Kingdom	The ship was driven ashore east of Littlehampton, Sussex. She was on a voyage from London to Liverpool, Lancashire. Laura Eliza was later refloated and resumed her voyage.
Martha	United States	The ship was destroyed by fire at Eastport.
Vedra	United Kingdom	The ship ran aground on the Braun Reff, off the coast of Denmark. She was on a voyage from Gloucester to Saint Petersburg, Russia. Vedra was later refloated and resumed her voyage.

== 7 July ==
List of shipwrecks: 7 July 1839
Ship	State	Description
Josephine	France	The ship ran aground on the Domesnes Reef. She was on a voyage from Cette, Hérault to Riga, Russia. Josephine was refloated and resumed her voyage.

== 8 July ==
List of shipwrecks: 8 July 1839
Ship	State	Description
Swalen	Sweden	The ship ran aground on the Goodwin Sands, Kent, United Kingdom. She was on a voyage from Gothenburg to Bordeaux, Gironde, France. Swalen was refloated and resumed her voyage.
Venus	United Kingdom	The ship was driven ashore at Stromness, Orkney Islands. She was on a voyage from Raahe, Grand Duchy of Finland to Liverpool, Lancashire. Venus was refloated on 10 July and taken into Stromness.

== 11 July ==
List of shipwrecks: 11 July 1839
Ship	State	Description
Eagle	United Kingdom	The schooner was damaged by fire at Fraserburgh, Aberdeenshire She was on a voyage from Sunderland, County Durham to Newburgh, Fife.
Hope	(United Kingdom of Great Britain and Ireland) New South Wales	The cutter was wrecked on the South Head Reef, off Port Jackson. Her crew were rescued.

== 12 July ==
List of shipwrecks: 12 July 1839
Ship	State	Description
Carl	Netherlands	The ship was sighted in the Øresund whilst on a voyage from Riga, Russia to Amsterdam, North Holland. No further trace, presumed foundered with the loss of all hands.
Caspar	Sweden	The ship was driven ashore at Faial Island, Azores. She was on a voyage from Gothenburg to New York, United States. Caspar was refloated on 29 July and taken into "Porto Fine".
Ellen Pope	United Kingdom	The schooner was driven ashore and wrecked at Bonmahon, County Cork. Her crew were rescued. She was on a voyage from Newport, Monmouthshire to Cork.
Generous Friends	United Kingdom	The wherry collided with Ipswich (United Kingdom) at Harwich, Essex and sank. All on board were rescued by Ipswich.

== 13 July ==
List of shipwrecks: 13 July 1839
Ship	State	Description
Elizabeth	United States	The ship was driven ashore in Sandy Bay, Gibraltar. She was on a voyage from Marseille, Bouches-du-Rhône to New York. Elizabeth was later refloated and put into Algeciras, Spain.
Margaret	United Kingdom	The ship was driven ashore and wrecked in the Tusket Islands, Nova Scotia, British North America. She was on a voyage from Boston, Massachusetts, United States to Sydney, Nova Scotia.

== 14 July ==
List of shipwrecks: July 1839
Ship	State	Description
Rhoda	United Kingdom	The brig ran aground in the Tamar River and was damaged. She was on a voyage from Launceston, Van Diemen's Land to London.
Waterloo	United Kingdom	The paddle steamer caught fire and sank in the English Channel 10 nautical miles (19 km) south south east of the Nab Lightship ( Trinity House). All on board transferred to the Nab Lightship. Waterloo was on a voyage from London to Gibraltar.

== 15 July ==
List of shipwrecks: 15 July 1839
Ship	State	Description
Elizabeth	United Kingdom	The ship ran aground on the Burbo Bank, in Liverpool Bay. She was on a voyage from Liverpool, Lancashire to Christianstadt, Sweden.

== 16 July ==
List of shipwrecks: 16 July 1839
Ship	State	Description
Countess of Dunmore	United Kingdom	The ship ran aground on the Burbo Bank, in Liverpool Bay.
Trio	United Kingdom	The ship was driven ashore at Wexford. She was on a voyage from Quebec City, Lower Canada, British North America to Wexford.

== 17 July ==
List of shipwrecks: 17 July 1839
Ship	State	Description
Speedwell	United Kingdom	The ship was driven ashore at Salcombe, Devon. She was later refloated.

== 18 July ==
List of shipwrecks: 18 July 1839
Ship	State	Description
Ann and Margaret	United Kingdom	The ship was driven ashore and wrecked at Milford Haven, Pembrokeshire. Her crew were rescued.
Britannia	United Kingdom	The ship ran aground on the Horse Shoe Bank, in Liverpool Bay.
Bromley	United Kingdom	The ship was driven ashore and wrecked in the Sound of Kylerea. She was on a voyage from Liverpool, Lancashire to Macduff, Aberdeenshire.
Frau Kea	Kingdom of Hanover	The ship was driven ashore near Seathorne, Lincolnshire, United Kingdom. She was on a voyage from Leer to Hull, Yorkshire, United Kingdom.
George Lockwood	United Kingdom	The ship was driven ashore at Penzance, Cornwall with the loss of all hands. She was refloated on 29 July.
Hero	United Kingdom	The ship was driven ashore and wrecked at Port Logan, Wigtownshire. Her crew were rescued. She was on a voyage from Glasgow, Renfrewshire to Dunkirk, Nord, France.
Hoop	Netherlands	The galiot was wrecked on the Bondicar Rocks, off the coast of Northumberland, United Kingdom. She was on a voyage from Rotterdam, South Holland to Dundee, Forfarshire, United Kingdom.
Mary	United Kingdom	The ship was driven ashore at Hull. She was on a voyage from Hamburg to Hull. Mary was refloated the next day.
Perseverance	United Kingdom	The ship was driven ashore and wrecked near Porthleven, Cornwall with the loss of all hands. She was on a voyage from Aberavon, Glamorgan to Truro, Cornwall.
Stafford	United Kingdom	The ship ran aground in the River Tees at Middlesbrough, Yorkshire.

== 19 July ==
List of shipwrecks: July 1839
Ship	State	Description
Apollo	United Kingdom	The brig was driven ashore and wrecked at Tenby, Pembrokeshire with the loss of six lives. She was on a voyage from Newport, Monmouthshire to Cork.
Autumn	United Kingdom	The brig was driven ashore at Millbay, Devon.
Dorchester	United Kingdom	The ship was driven ashore near Laugharne, Carmarthenshire. Her crew were rescued. She was on a voyage from Quebec City, Lower Canada, British North America to Bristol, Gloucestershire. Dorchester was refloated on 26 July.
Drake	United Kingdom	The brig was driven ashore and wrecked at Plymouth, Devon. All on board were rescued.
Elizabeth	United Kingdom	The ship was driven ashore and damaged at Millbay. She was on a voyage from London to Gloucester. Elizabeth was later refloated.
Erwartung	Flag unknown	The ship was sighted in the Øresund whilst on a voyage from Saint Petersburg, Russia. to Antwerp, Belgium. No further trace, presumed foundered with the loss of all hands.
Falkland	United Kingdom	The ship was driven ashore and damaged at Liverpool, Lancashire. She was on a voyage from Danzig to Liverpool. Falkland was refloated on 20 July and taken into Liverpool.
Frau Kea	Kingdom of Hanover	The ship was driven ashore at Seathorne, Lincolnshire, United Kingdom. She was on a voyage from Leer to hull, Yorkshire, United Kingdom.
Margaret	United Kingdom	The ship was driven ashore and wrecked at Bridport, Dorset. She was on a voyage from Tobago to London.
Mary	Hamburg	The ship was driven ashore at Hull. She was refloated the next day and taken into Hull.
Nancy	United Kingdom	The ship was wrecked on the Pollock Rocks, off the Isle of Man. Her crew were rescued by Mona's Isle ( (United Kingdom of Great Britain and Ireland) Isle of Man). She was on a voyage from Liverpool to Drogheda, County Louth.
Naomi	United Kingdom	The ship was driven ashore and wrecked at Bridport. Her crew were rescued. She was on a voyage from London to Bristol, Gloucestershire.
Pheasant	United Kingdom	The ship was driven ashore near the Hook Lighthouse, County Wexford. She was on a voyage from Newport to Waterford.
Pickering Dodge	United States	The ship was driven ashore and wrecked at the mouth of the River Tâf with the loss of five of the sixteen people on board. She was on a voyage from Liverpool, Lancashire, United Kingdom to Newport and Salem, Massachusetts.
Visitor	United Kingdom	The ship was driven ashore near Theddlethorpe, Lincolnshire. Her crew were rescued. She was on a voyage from Arkhangelsk, Russia to King's Lynn, Norfolk.

== 20 July ==
List of shipwrecks: 20 July 1839
Ship	State	Description
Coralie et Melanie	France	The ship was dismasted in the English Channel whilst on a voyage from London, United Kingdom to Guadeloupe. She was towed into Portsmouth, Hampshire, United Kingdom, where she was subsequently condemned.
Falcon	United Kingdom	The ship was driven ashore and damaged at Liverpool, Lancashire. She was on a voyage from Danzig to Liverpool. Falcon was later refloated and taken into Liverpool.
Lady Curraghmore	United Kingdom	The sloop foundered in the Irish Sea off the Smalls Lighthouse with the loss of five of the fourteen people on board. Survivors were rescued by the steamship City of Limerick (United Kingdom). Lady Curraghmore was on a voyage from Dungarvan, County Antrim to Swansea, Glamorgan.
Ocean	United Kingdom	The ship was driven ashore at Redcar, Yorkshire. She was later refloated and taken into Hartlepool, County Durham.

== 21 July ==
List of shipwrecks: July 1839
Ship	State	Description
Charlotte	United Kingdom	The ship was driven ashore at Dove Point. She was on a voyage from Liverpool, Lancashire to Boston. Charlotte was refloated on 22 July and resumed her voyage.

== 23 July ==
List of shipwrecks: 23 July 1839
Ship	State	Description
Active	United Kingdom	The ship was driven ashore near Huna, Caithness. She was on a voyage from Liverpool, Lancashire to Fraserburgh, Aberdeenshire. Active was later refloated and resumed her voyage.

== 24 July ==
List of shipwrecks: 24 July 1839
Ship	State	Description
Aquiles	Chilean Navy	The brigantine was driven ashore and wrecked at Callao, Peru.
George Canning	Hamburg	The ship was driven ashore and wrecked at Copiapó, Chile.
Jane	United Kingdom	The ship was driven ashore and wrecked at Copiapó with the loss of a crew member.
Monteagudo	Chilean Navy	The frigate sank off Valparaíso. Her crew were rescued.
Theodore	Chile	The brig was driven ashore and wrecked at Copiapó.

== 25 July ==
List of shipwrecks: 25 July 1839
Ship	State	Description
Venus	United Kingdom	The ship was wrecked near Arendal, Norway. She was on a voyage from "Tobye" to Hull, Yorkshire.

== 26 July ==
List of shipwrecks: 26 July 1839
Ship	State	Description
Admiral Cockburn	United Kingdom	The whaler was driven ashore and wrecked at Mussenberg, Cape Town with the loss of a crew member. She was on a voyage from the South Seas to London.
Lord Byron	United Kingdom	The ship foundered whilst on a voyage from Brixham, Devon to the Canary Islands. Her crew were rescued.
Nordstjern	Norway	The ship was driven ashore at Leith, Lothian, United Kingdom. She was on a voyage from Leith to Farsund.

== 27 July ==
List of shipwrecks: 27 July 1839
Ship	State	Description
British Queen	United Kingdom	The brig was wrecked at Walberswick, Suffolk. She was on a voyage from Newcastle upon Tyne, Northumberland to Southwold, Suffolk.
Oceanus	Stettin	The ship ran aground on the Kentish Knock. Her crew were rescued. She was on a voyage from Stettin to Honfleur, Calvados, France. Oceanus was refloated on 30 July.
Superior	United Kingdom	The ship was wrecked on the Kentish Knock. Her crew were rescued. She was on a voyage from Newcastle upon Tyne, Northumberland to Fécamp, Seine-Inférieure, France.
Trotter	United Kingdom	The ship was run down and sunk in the North Sea off Berwick upon Tweed, Northumberland by Manchester (United Kingdom). Her crew were rescued. She was on a voyage from Newcastle upon Tyne to Arbroath, Forfarshire.

== 28 July ==
List of shipwrecks: 28 July 1839
Ship	State	Description
Eleanor	United Kingdom	The ship was wrecked at Port Natal, Natalia Republic.

== 29 July ==
List of shipwrecks: 29 July 1839
Ship	State	Description
George Lockwood	United Kingdom	The ship was driven ashore at Penzance, Cornwall. She was later refloated and taken into Penzance.

== 30 July ==
List of shipwrecks: 30 July 1839
Ship	State	Description
Eleanor	United Kingdom	The ship ran aground on the Gar Sand, in the North Sea off the coast of County Durham. She floated off and was driven ashore at Seaton Snook, County Durham. Eleanor was on a voyage from Quebec City, Lower Canada, British North America to Seaton Sluice, County Durham. Eleanor was refloated on 3 August and taken into Stockton-on-Tees, County Durham.

== 31 July ==
List of shipwrecks: 31 July 1839
Ship	State	Description
Angel	Spain	The ship was wrecked on Point Carubbulus, Cuba. All on board were rescued. She was on a voyage from Barcelona to Havana, Cuba.
Benledi	United Kingdom	The paddle steamer was holed following a steampipe explosion. All 200-plus passengers were rescued by the paddle steamer Bonnie Dundee (United Kingdom). Benledi was on a voyage from Newshaven, Lothian to Dundee, Forfarshire.
Cornelis	Netherlands	The ship was abandoned in the Atlantic Ocean and subsequently foundered. She was on a voyage from Havana, Cuba to Amsterdam, North Holland.
Egeria	United Kingdom	The ship was wrecked on the Gunfleet Sand, in the North Sea off the coast of Essex. Her crew were rescued. She was on a voyage from Arkhangelsk, Russia to London.
George IV	United Kingdom	The ship was driven ashore and wrecked at Llanddulas, Caernarfonshire Her crew were rescued.
Margaretha Mathilda	Denmark	The ship was driven ashore on Ameland, Friesland, Netherlands. She was on a voyage from Thisted to London, United Kingdom. Margaretha Matilda was refloated the next day and put into Hollum, Friesland.
Severn	United Kingdom	The brig ran aground of the Gunfleet Sand and was abandoned by her crew. She was later refloated and taken into Wivenhoe, Essex.
Thomas and Ann	United Kingdom	The ship was wrecked at Whitby, Yorkshire.
William and Edward	United Kingdom	The ship was driven ashore at Llanddulas. She was refloated on 3 August.

== Unknown date ==
List of shipwrecks: Unknown date in July 1839
Ship	State	Description
Bethel	United Kingdom	The ship foundered in the Atlantic Ocean. All on board were rescued by Thomas (United Kingdom).Bethel was on a voyage from Cardiff, Glamorgan to Philadelphia, Pennsylvania, United States.
Drake	United Kingdom	The ship was driven ashore and severely damaged at Plymouth, Devon. She was refloated on 29 July.
Elizabeth	United Kingdom	The ship was driven ashore and damaged in Millbay. She was on a voyage from London to Gloucester. Elizabeth was later refloated.
Farmer	United Kingdom	The ship was driven ashore at Montrose, Forfarshire. She was refloated on 19 July and taken into Montrose.
John	United Kingdom	The ship struck rocks off the Île d'Orléans, Lower Canada, British North America. She was on a voyage from Quebec City, Lower Canada to Hull, Yorkshire. John was towed back to Quebec City, where she arrived on 8 July. She was consequently condemned.
Mentor	United Kingdom	The ship was driven ashore near Varberg, Sweden. She was later refloated and towed into Gothenburg.
Mic Mac	(United Kingdom of Great Britain and Ireland) New South Wales	The whaler, a brig, was wrecked on Bond's Reefs before 8 July.
Naparina	United Kingdom	The ship was driven ashore at "Malane" before 22 July. She was on a voyage from Dublin to Quebec City. Naparina was late refloated and taken into Quebec City.
Ocean	United Kingdom	The ship was driven ashore at Redcar, Yorkshire. She was refloated on 20 July and put into Hartlepool, County Durham.
Sophia	United Kingdom	The ship was driven ashore in Runswick Bay. She was refloated on 11 July.
William and Mary	United Kingdom	The ship was run aground on the Corton Sand, in the North Sea off the coast of Suffolk. She was refloated on 26 July and proceeded on her voyage.
