= Evenburg =

Coordinates: 53°13′52″N 7°29′41″E

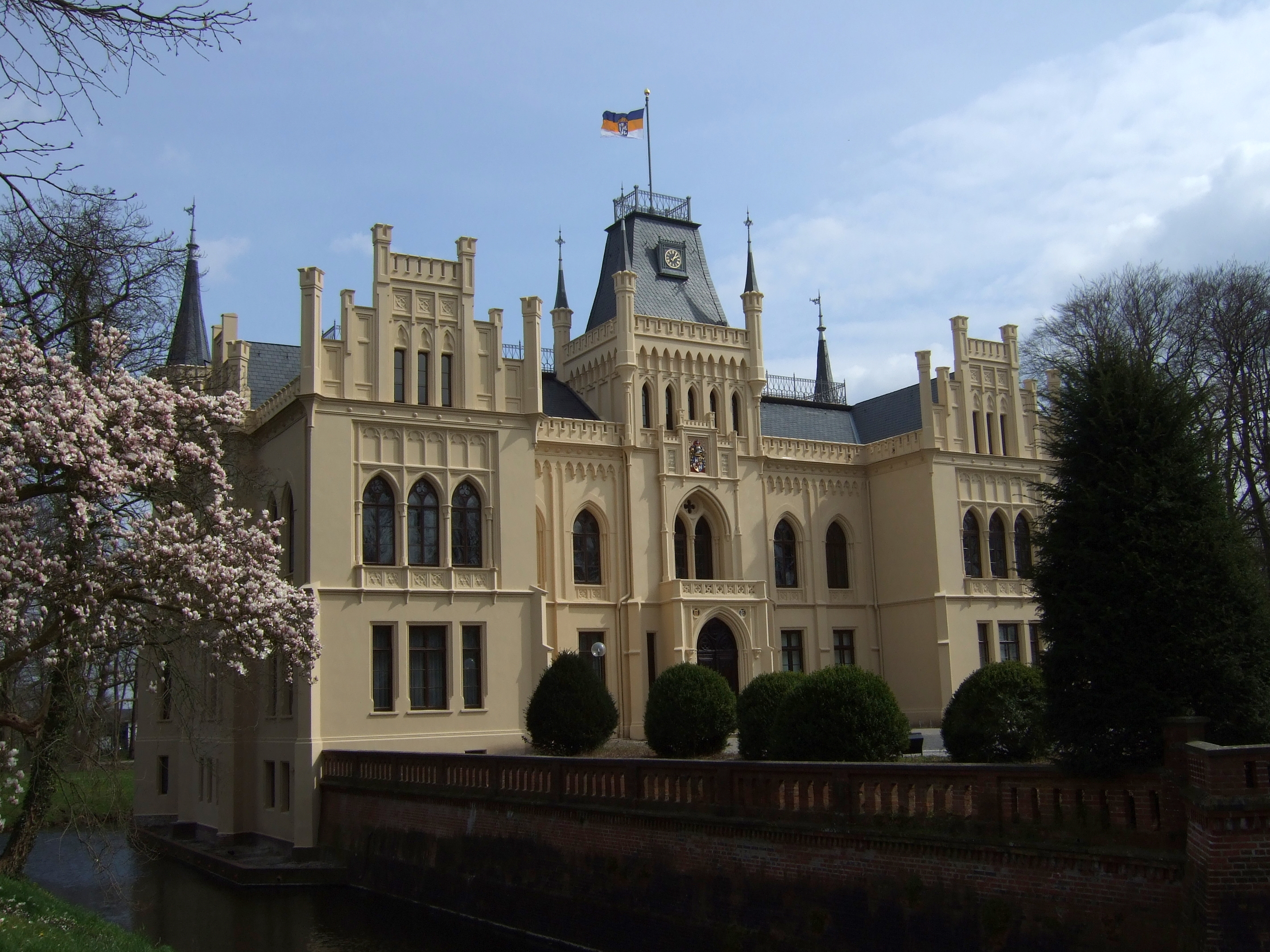
Castle in neugothic style: The Evenburg 2007.

The Evenburg is a water castle in the village of Loga (Leer) in north Germany (East Frisia/Ostfriesland) not far from the River Leda.

== History ==
It was built by Colonel Erhard Reichsfreiherr von Ehrentreuter of Hofrieth (1596-1664), commander of the Dutch garrison in Emden, between the years 1642 and 1650. He named the castle after his wife Eva, Baroness Ungnad, of Bohemia, whom he had married in 1631. Colonel von Ehrentreuter had been enfeoffed with Loga and the neighbouring village of Logabirum by Count Ulrich II of East Frisia to pay off his considerable gambling debts.

Marie von Ehrentreuter (1633-1702), the youngest daughter of the colonel, married Gustav Wilhelm Freiherr von Wedel (1641-1717) who came from Königsberg. The later field marshal of the Danish King Christian became the new lord of Evenburg and also the Governor of Oldenburg Land. In 1684, having amassed a considerable fortune, he bought the Jarlsberg near Christiania (Oslo) in Norway as well. From that time onwards, the von Wedels were given the title of Count.

Descendants of the von Wedel family, whose main residence today is Gödens Castle in the parish of Sande, occupied the Evenburg for centuries.

== Architecture ==
In 1861/62, the building, which was one of the earliest examples of classical architecture in the Dutch style, was badly in need of repair and was largely demolished. Only the foundation walls and the vault of the old transept in the centre were incorporated into the new residence, which was otherwise executed in the Neo-Gothic style; its architect being Richard Stueve from Hanover.

During the Second World War (1939-1945) the castle was badly damaged. The filigreed roof structures could not be restored, the roof was covered very simply.

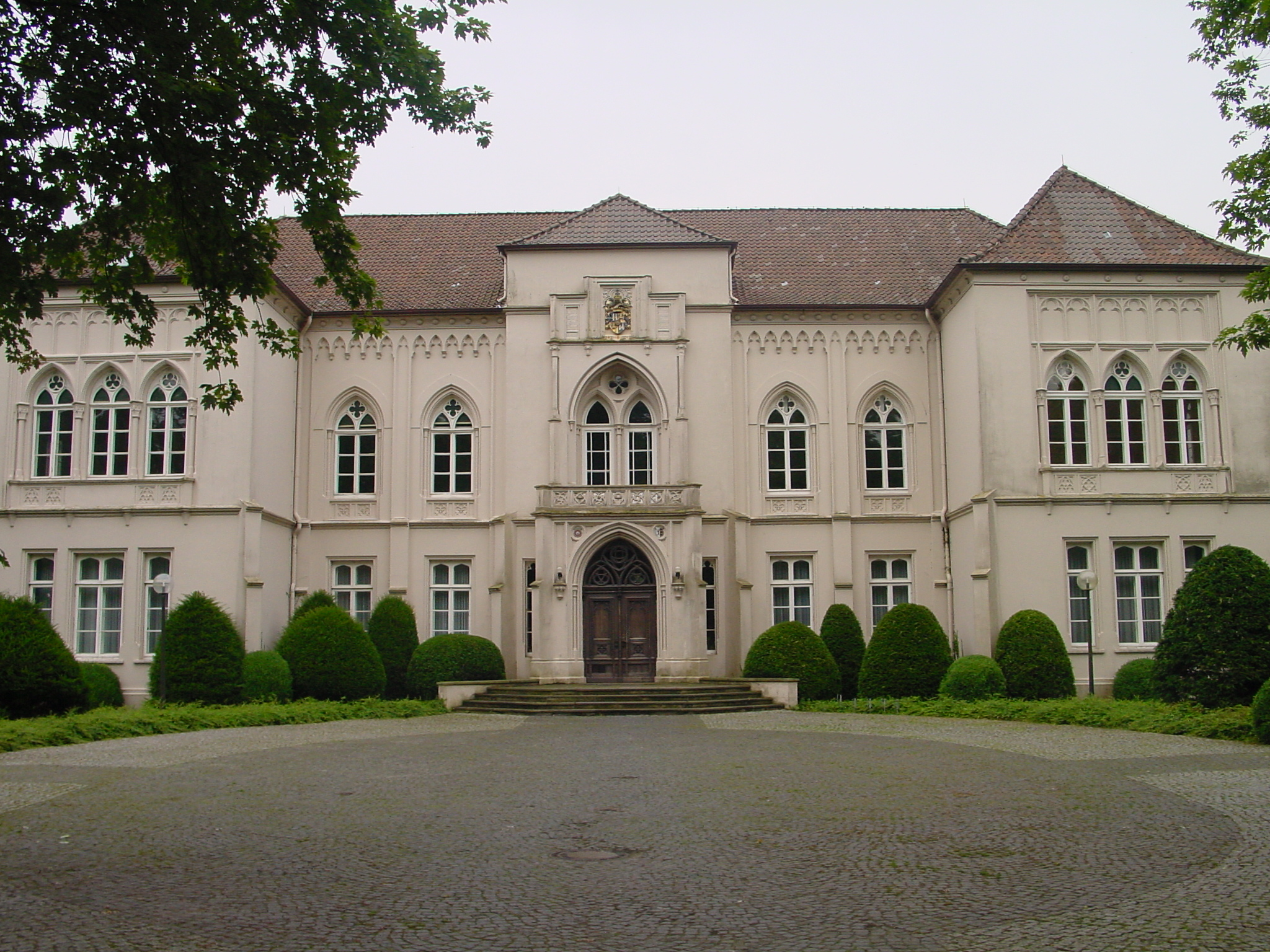
Frontal view of the Evenburg in the years 1972-2002

After extensive renovation work the Evenburg is now home to various institutions including the Education Academy of East Frisia and a college for grammar school teachers. Until a few years ago it also housed the district media centre for Leer district, who had acquired the Evenburg in June 1975 along with its estates for about seven million deutschmarks from the von Wedels. Its attractions include the long double avenue, which leads from the town of Leer to the castle, the baroque bastion (Vorburg) of 1703 (home to the district music school), the hallway, the remains of the old stables and the extensive landscaped park in the style of an English garden with paths to the Ledadeich (dyke).

By 2006 the Evenburg had been returned to its appearance in the mid-19th century. The neo-Gothic roof and many interior details were restored. It was opened in January 2007. The castle may be visited as part of a guided tours. The hall (Saal) and the bastion host concerts and other events.

== Sources ==
- Bärenfänger, Rolf (1996). Archäologie im Park des Schlosses Evenburg in Loga. Wegweiser zur Vor- und Frühgeschichte Niedersachsens 26. Oldenburg:Isensee Verlag, ISBN 3-89995-319-3.
- Braukmüller, Heide and Neumann, Detlev (1996). Zur Geschichte der Evenburg. Leer:Reinhard, ISBN 3-927139-24-6.
- Gerdes, Klaus (2008). Naturkundlicher Führer durch den Evenburgpark in Loga, Leer:Landkreis Leer, ISBN 978-3-00-025859-6
