= Unken (disambiguation) =

Unken is a municipality in the district of Zell am See in the state of Salzburg in Austria.

Unken may also refer to:

- Unkenreflex or unken reflex, a defensive posture adopted by some amphibians
- Hayo Unken, first owner of Harderwykenburg castle, in Leer, Lower Saxony, Germany
- Unken Inuzuka, character in the manga Sumomomo Momomo
