= Haneburg =

Coordinates: 53°13′38″N 7°26′36″E

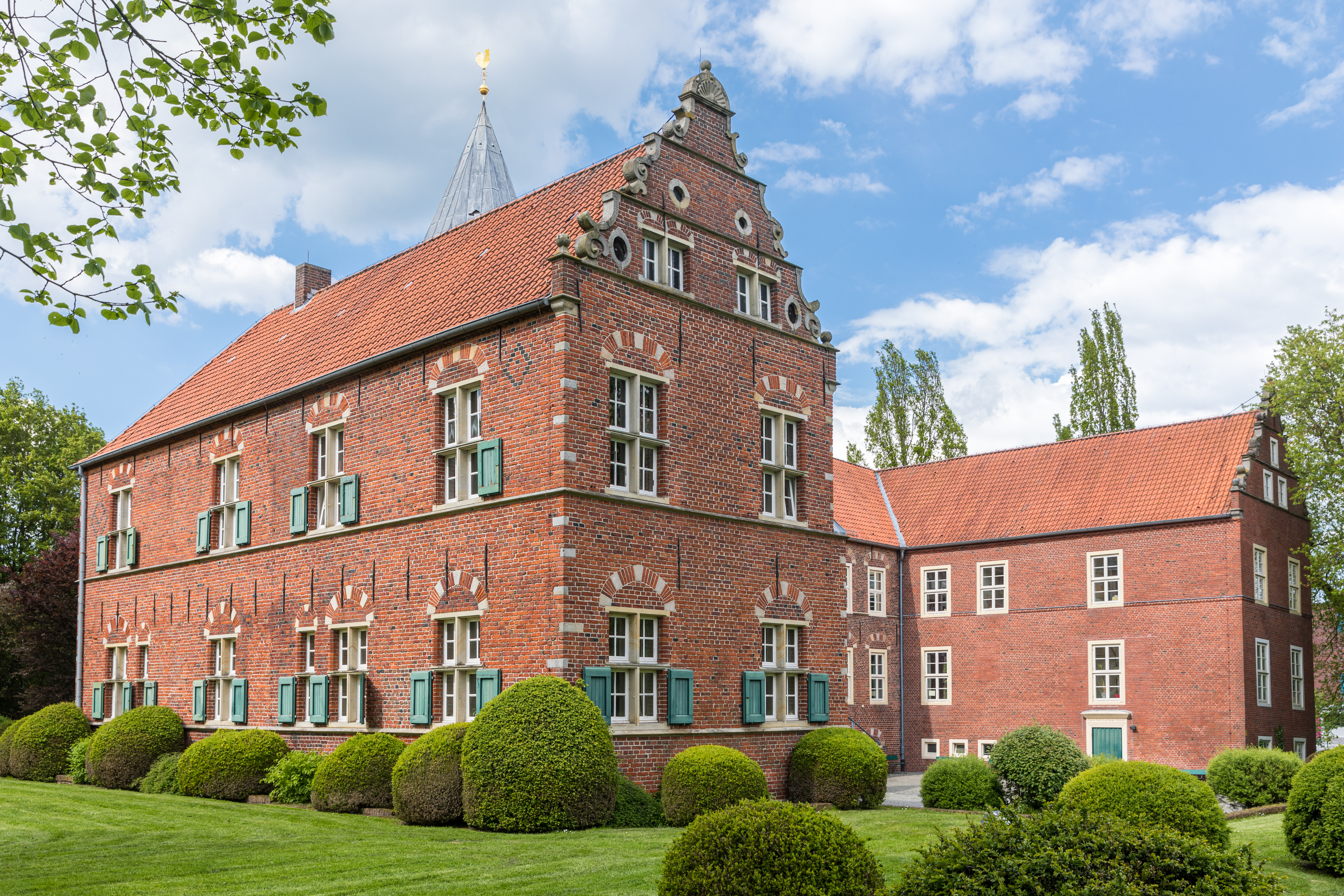
Haneburg in Leer

Haneburg is a castle in East Frisia, Germany. It is one of the few buildings remaining of the Renaissance time in north-west Germany, which was much affected by the Netherlands. The castle was built by the chieftain of Leer, Hayo Unken, in the middle of the 15th century.

Subsequently, the castle passed via the Frese family into the possession of the Hane family, from whom the building takes its present name. Joest Hane, the steward (Drost) of the Count of East Frisia in Stickhausen, began to repair the castle in 1621 and extended it by the addition of the southern Renaissance wing. His son Dietrich Arnold Hane built the northern wing in 1671.

Until some years ago the Haneburg was an old people's home. After complex renovation work it is today the home of the office of the people's high school for the city and district of Leer. Temporarily it is in use for art exhibitions and conferences. It is the property of the district of Leer, which uses the knights' hall for representative causes. However, historical interiors are no longer present in the castle.
