= Ulf Thiele =

German politician (born 1971)

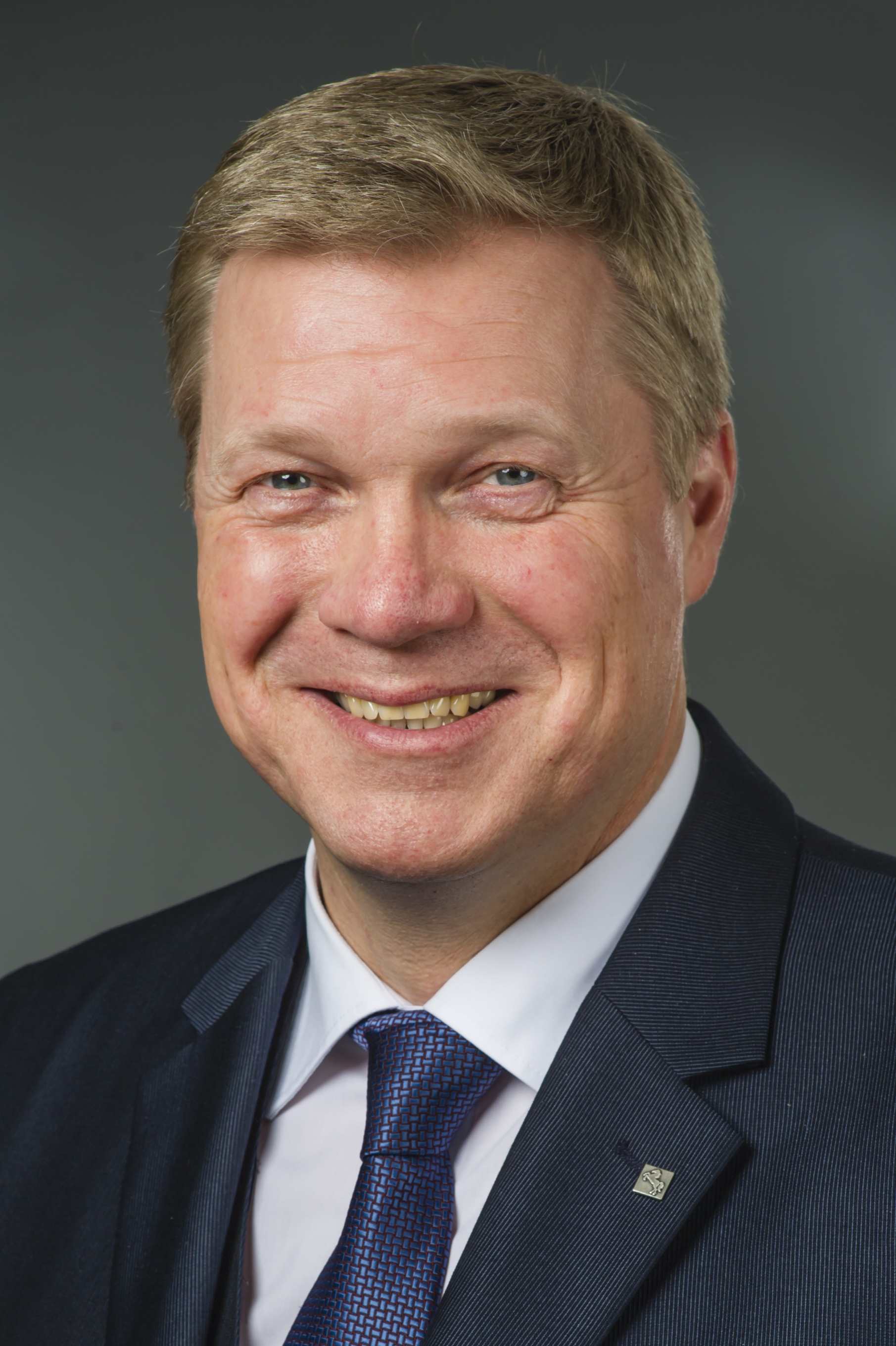
- Thiele in 2018

Member of the Landtag of Lower Saxony
- Incumbent
- Assumed office 4 March 2003
- Preceded by: Anton Lücht
- Constituency: Leer

Personal details
- Born: 8 April 1971 (age 55) Leer
- Party: Christian Democratic Union (since 1991)

Ulf Thiele (born 8 April 1971 in Leer) is a German politician serving as a member of the Landtag of Lower Saxony since 2003. He has served as chairman of the Christian Democratic Union in East Frisia since 2020.
