= Logabirum =

Coordinates: 53°15′N 7°31′E

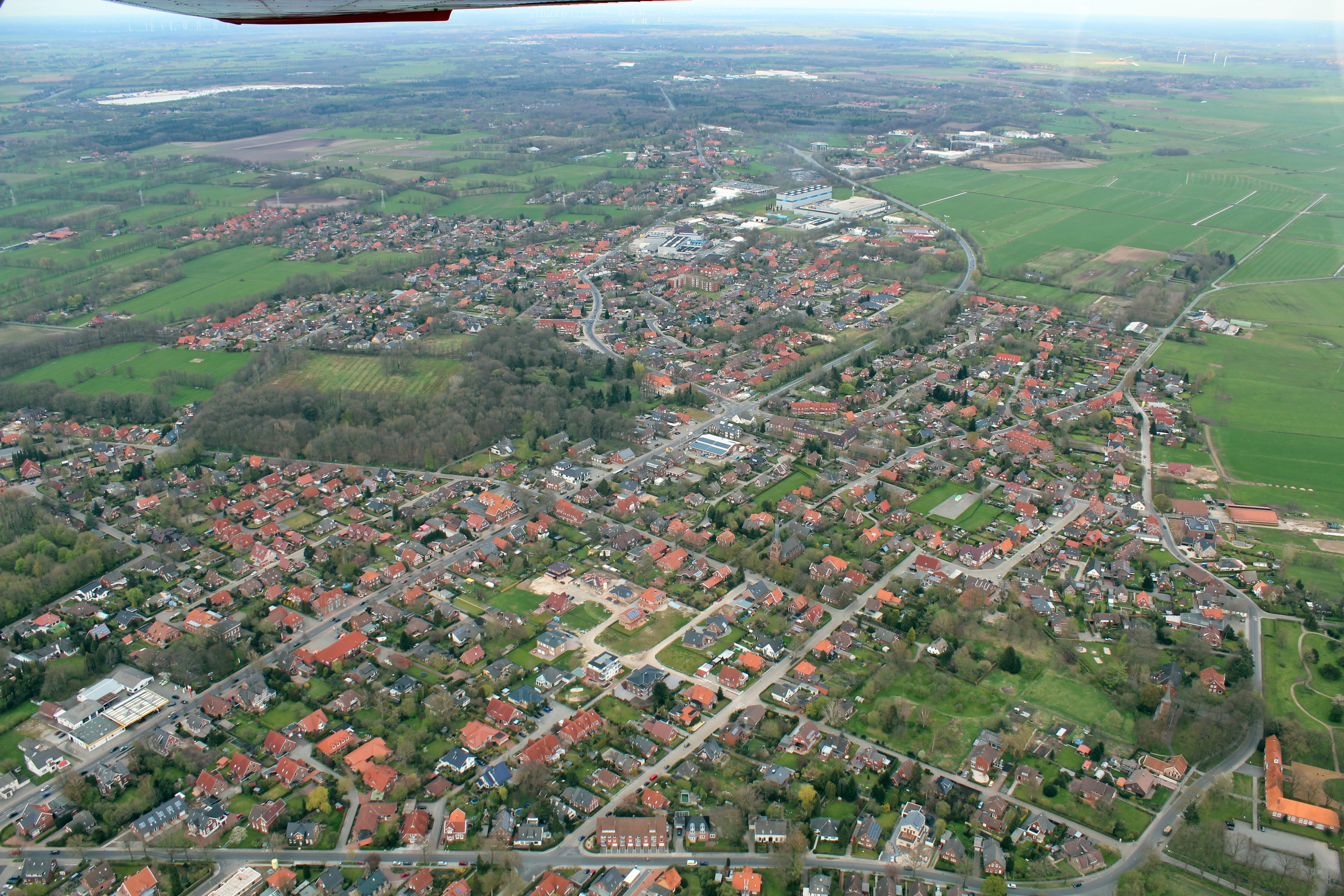
- Interactive map of Logabirum

Logabirum is a quarter in the city of Leer in East Frisia, Lower Saxony, Germany.

== The name ==
Logabirum was documented for the first time in 1439 as Loghebeerne. Before the spelling of Logabirum was fixed, it had a number of different variations. e.g.

- On a gravestone plate of 1598, one can recognize an old way of writing: "Loech Beerum".
- On old maps and documents, Logabirum is also written as "Logeberum," "Logaeberumi" or "Lochberum".

There are also many different ways of interpreting the origins of the name.

One possibility is that "Loghe" or "Loech" comes from German and meant "locality/local/village". "Beerum" or "Berum" means forest, thus "Logabirum" meant village at the forest. After G. Lohse and H. Thomas thought "birum" should be to attributed to the Germanic word "bir" (farmstead). Thus "Berum" would mean "in the yards" and Logabirum "in the yards with Loga".

Another interpretation again comes from that Celtic origins, i.e. "Lo" - height, "ge" - green country, "berum" - "homestead of the bears". Here it is considered that the forest in its current shape was only cultivated by the count house and thus is substantially younger.

== History ==
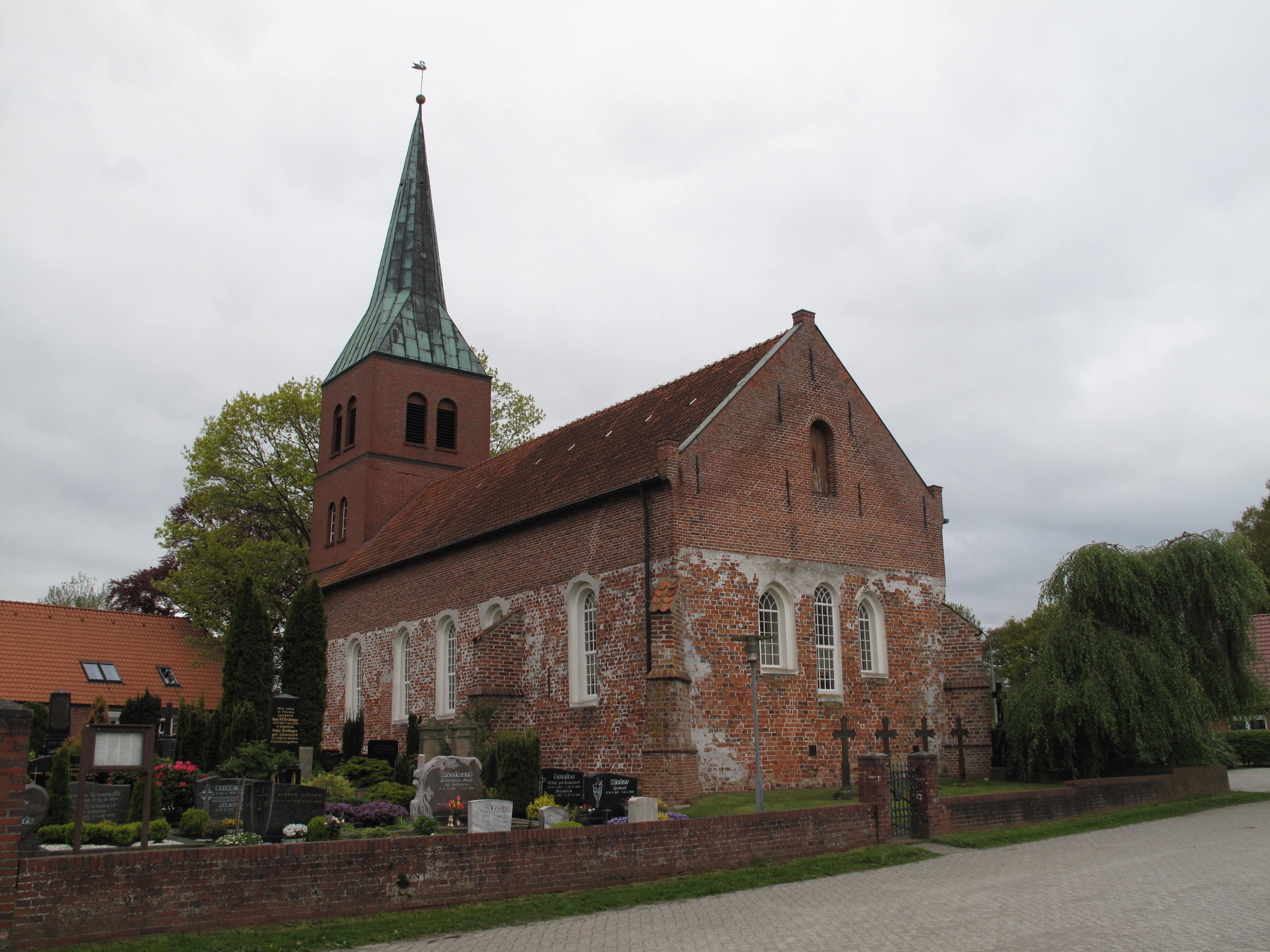
Church of Logabirum

Logabirum was built on a geest, oriented southwest-northeast. Based on different investigations and urn findings, the oldest traces of habitation around Logabirum date back to before 2000 BC, more specifically in Siebenbergen. There was an old dolmen field, from which only one or two dolmens remain in a small forest.

Landmarks in Logabirum include the church, which was probably built around 1300. Additionally, the only mill in the Leer area can be found in Logabirum. This mill has been in the possession of the Eicklenborg family since its construction in 1895.

In 1973, Logabirum became part of the city of Leer in East Frisia (Lower Saxony). Nevertheless, it retained much of its village atmosphere.
