= Waltham Holy Cross Urban District =

Former district of Essex, England

Coordinates: 51.6°N 0.1°E

Waltham Holy Cross
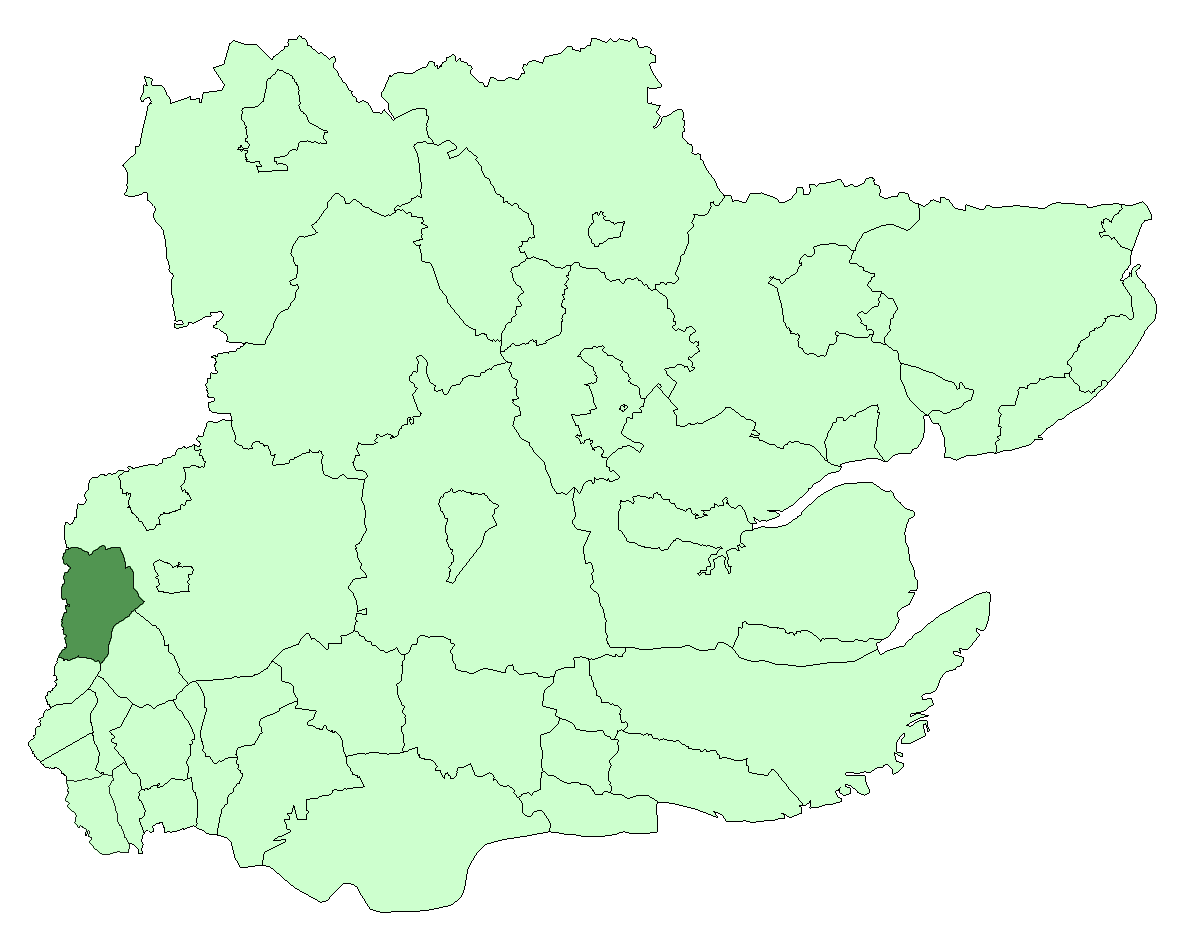
- Waltham Holy Cross within Essex in 1961
- Area
  - 1911: 11,017 acres (44.58 km^{2})
  - 1931: 11,016 acres (44.58 km^{2})
  - 1961: 10,959 acres (44.35 km^{2})
- Population
  - 1911: 6,795
  - 1931: 8,201
  - 1961: 11,655
- Density
  - 1911: 0.6/acre
  - 1931: 0.7/acre
  - 1961: 1.1/acre
- History
  - Origin: Waltham Holy Cross parish
  - Created: 1850
  - Abolished: 1974
  - Succeeded by: Epping Forest
- Status: Local board of health district (1850–1894); Urban district (1894–1974)
- Government: Waltham Holy Cross Local Board of Health (1850–1894); Waltham Holy Cross Urban District Council (1894–1974)
  - HQ: Town Hall, Waltham Abbey
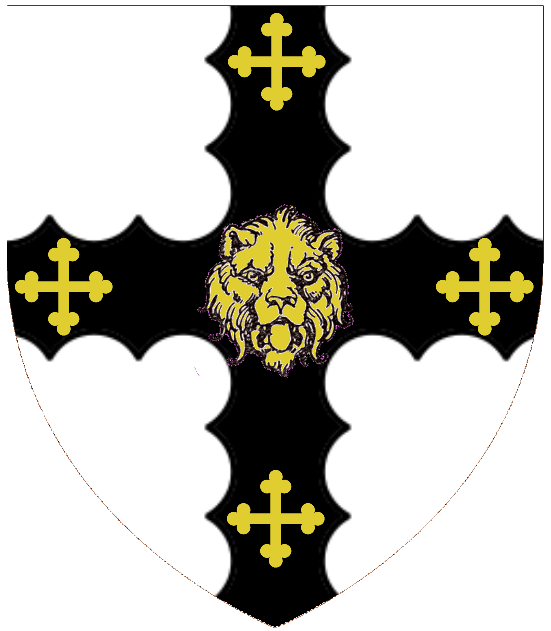

Waltham Holy Cross (also known as Waltham Abbey) was a local government district in the county of Essex, England. It was created as a local board district in 1850, covering the ancient parish of Waltham Holy Cross. In 1894 it became an urban district.

It formed part of London's Metropolitan Police District. The urban district was within the area considered by the Royal Commission on Local Government in Greater London, but it was decided not to include it in Greater London when that was created in 1965. The district was abolished and amalgamated with other local government districts in 1974 to form the Epping Forest non-metropolitan district. As part of the 1974 reforms, a successor parish was created covering the abolished urban district, named Waltham Abbey.

== History ==
In 1850, the large ancient parish of Waltham Holy Cross, commonly referred to as Waltham Abbey, adopted the Public Health Act 1848 (11 & 12 Vict. c. 63). The parish therefore became a local board district, administered by an elected local board with powers to provide certain local government functions relating to public health, notably around the provision of water supply and sewers. Local board districts were also classed as urban sanitary districts after 1872, when they were given further powers.

Such local board districts were reconstituted as urban districts under the Local Government Act 1894, with the local board being replaced by an urban district council. The district formed part of the London Traffic Area from 1924 and the London Passenger Transport Area from 1933.

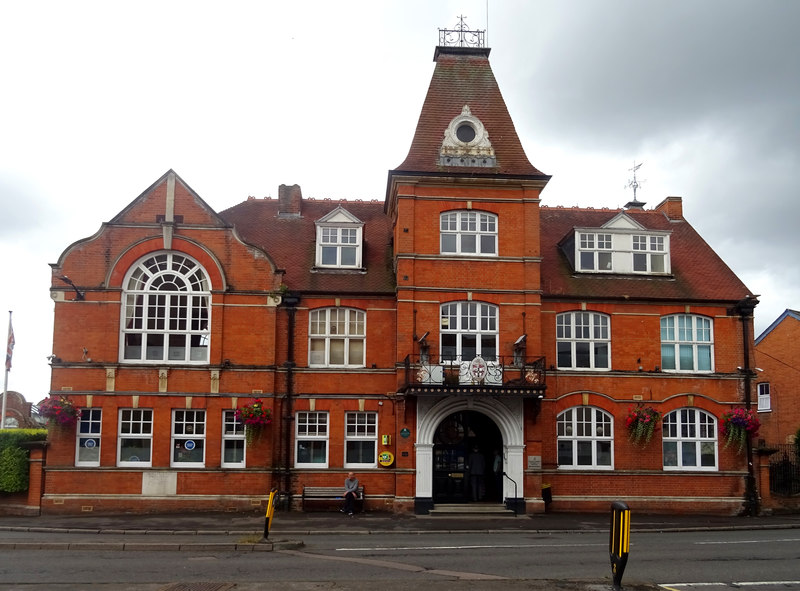
Waltham Abbey Town Hall

The council built itself Waltham Abbey Town Hall on Highbridge Street in 1904 to serve as its headquarters.

Following the Local Government Act 1929, in 1932 it was proposed that Waltham Holy Cross and Chingford should be merged to form a new urban district of Chingford and Waltham Abbey. The amalgamation was supported by Chingford Urban District Council but was not supported by the Waltham Holy Cross Urban District Council, who feared increased rates and the potential loss of the annual fair and market. The lack of a direct rail connection between the districts was also highlighted. The review resulted in no amalgamation and only a small transfer of territory from Waltham Holy Cross to Chingford.

The district was within the Metropolitan Police District and part of the review area of the Royal Commission on Local Government in Greater London set up in 1957. The commission decided not to include the district in the proposed Greater London area, because it was entirely within the Metropolitan Green Belt and had limited connection to the London built-up area.

The urban district was abolished in 1974 under the Local Government Act 1972, becoming part of the non-metropolitan district of Epping Forest.

A successor parish was formed for the area of the Waltham Holy Cross Urban District. It was renamed Waltham Abbey upon creation in 1974. By resolution of the new parish council, the civil parish adopted the status of a town, allowing the parish council to take the title Waltham Abbey Town Council, with its headquarters at Waltham Abbey Town Hall.

== Geography ==
The district was bounded on the west by the River Lea and contained a large part of Epping Forest. The main settlement was the town of Waltham Abbey, with four outlying hamlets of Holyfield, Upshire, High Beech and Sewardstone. Following a county review order in 1934, an area of 58 acres with a population of 23 (in 1931) was transferred to Chingford Urban District.

=== Coat of arms ===
The urban district council was granted a coat of arms on 9 November 1956. The black engrailed cross and four gold cross crosslets on a silver ground come from the arms of Waltham Abbey and the lion's face is from the attributed arms of King Harold Godwinson. The crest above the arms featured a stag for Epping Forest. In the stag's mouth was a seaxe, or distinctive notched sword, from the arms of Essex County Council. A heraldic fountain on the stag's shoulder represented the King George V Reservoir. The colours of the torse wreath and mantling were red and white: the livery colours of both Essex County Council and the City of London Corporation, custodians of Epping Forest. The coat of arms of the urban district council were transferred to Waltham Abbey Town Council by Order in Council in 1974.

Coat of arms of Waltham Holy Cross Urban District
Notes Granted 9 November 1956, to the Waltham Holy Cross Urban District Council. Crest Out of a Coronet composed of six Fleurs-de-Lys set upon a Rim Or a demi-Stag at gaze proper charged on the shoulder with a Fountain and holding in the mouth a Seaxe the blade Argent the hilt and pommel Or mantled Gules doubled Argent. Escutcheon Argent on a Cross engrailed Sable a Lion's Face between four Crosses bottonnée Or. Motto Sanctae Nomine Crucis
