= Bingumer Sand =

Island in the river Ems

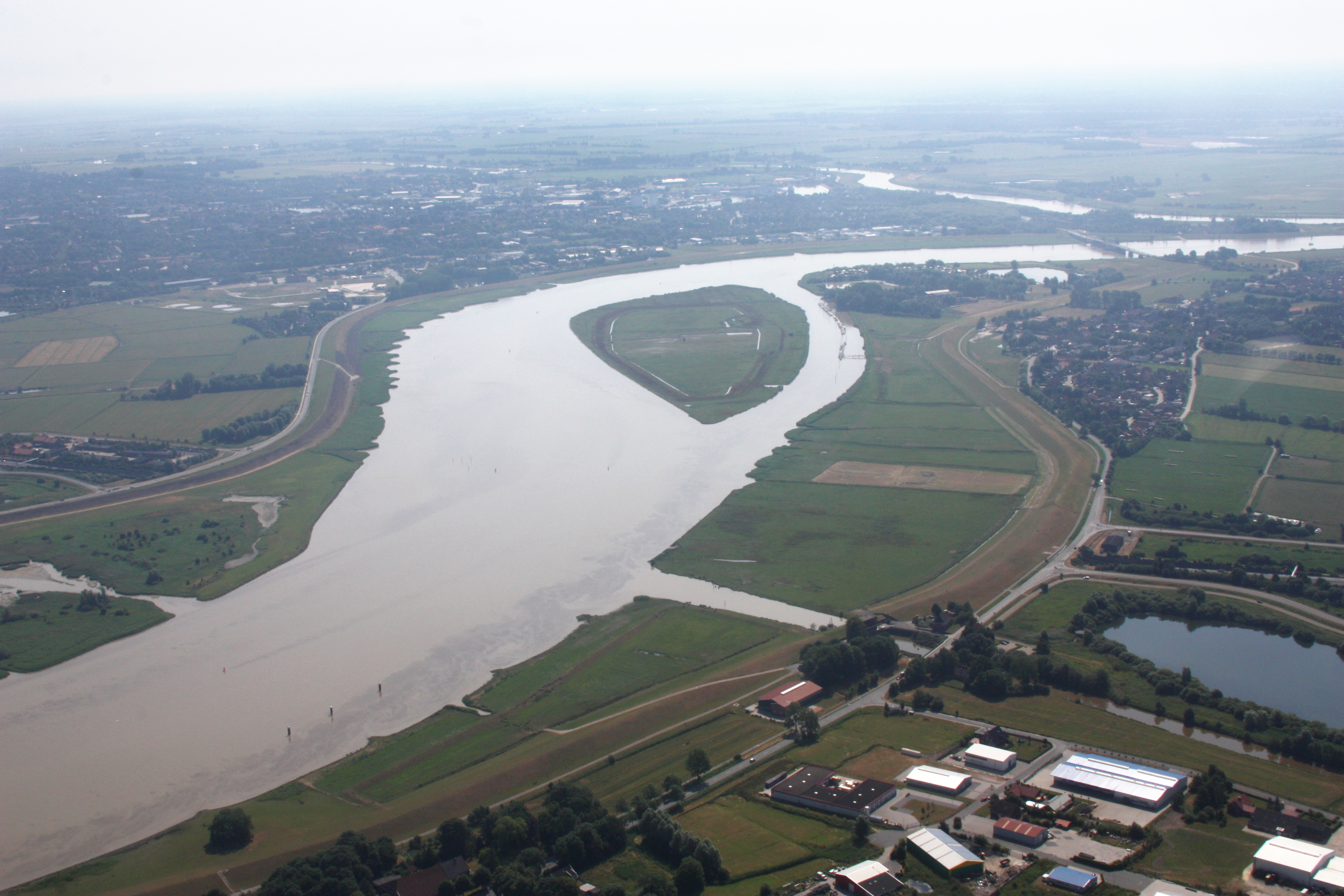
- Bingumer Sand. Behind: the town of Leer

Geography
- Coordinates: 53°13′41″N 7°25′05″E
- Adjacent to: River Ems

Bingumer Sand is a small river island in the Ems off the Rheiderland shore near Bingum in East Frisia. It is part of the Emsauen zwischen Ledamündung und Oldersum nature reserve. Not far from the Bingumer Sand is the Jann Berghaus Bridge.

== Function ==
The naturally formed island is used today as a shelter for Bingum's marina. In summer the island is used as pasture for cattle. To protect it from sudden storm surges a two-metre-high earth bank was made. In winter the cattle are transported to the mainland by ferry. Until c. 1970 high pylons for an overhead line crossing as part of a medium tension network crossed the Ems on Bingumer Sand. Several brick foundations bear witness today.

== Literature ==
- Moning, Christoph; Weiß, Felix (2015). Vögel beobachten in Norddeutschland.
