= Waltham Abbey Town Hall =

Municipal building in Waltham Abbey, Essex, England

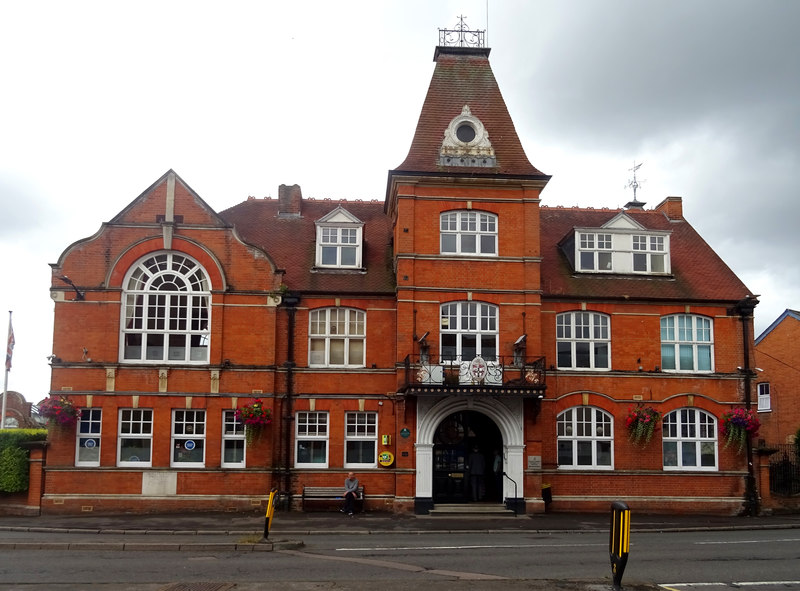
- Waltham Abbey Town Hall

- Location within Essex

General information
- Architectural style: Art Nouveau style
- Location: Waltham Abbey, Highbridge Street
- Coordinates: 51.6873°N 0.0045°W
- Inaugurated: 1904

Design and construction
- Main contractor: John Bentley & Sons

Waltham Abbey Town Hall is a municipal building in Highbridge Street, Waltham Abbey, Essex. The town hall was completed in 1904 as the headquarters of Waltham Holy Cross Urban District Council, and today serves as the headquarters of Waltham Abbey Town Council. An example of Art Nouveau architecture, it is a locally listed building.

== History ==
Local civic officials found it necessary to establish some proper accommodation following the formation of the Waltham Holy Cross Urban District in 1894. The site selected was occupied by an old slum called Camps Court which was accordingly demolished. The foundation stone for the "Waltham Holy Cross Council Buildings" was laid by Mrs A. J. Chapman, wife of the then chairman of the council, in January 1904. The building, which was designed in the Art Nouveau style with a tower in the style of a French chateau, was built by the local contractor, John Bentley & Sons. It was officially opened by Mrs A. J. Chapman in late 1904.

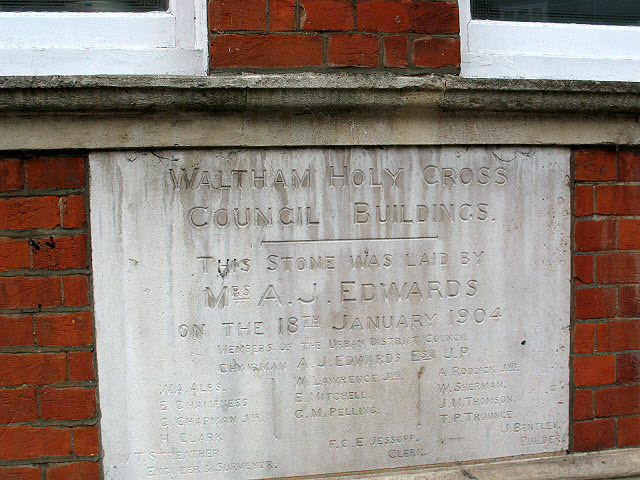
Foundation stone of the town hall

There were originally two arched doorways to the west of the front door for use by a horse-drawn fire engine. The fire engine was mechanised in 1923 and the fire station moved to Romeland after the Second World War.

In late 1914, during the First World War, the building was converted for use as a Red Cross Voluntary Aid Detachment hospital. The hospital initially deployed 40 beds but later in the war this increased to 50 beds, and after a hutted ward had been built it increased to 64 beds.

The building continued to be the meeting place of Waltham Holy Cross Urban District Council but ceased to be the local seat of government when Epping Forest District was formed by the Local Government Act 1972 in 1974.

In 2003 a plaque was erected on the town hall by the Richard III Society to commemorate the 500th anniversary of the death of Margaret of York, who had local connections and had been sister of both King Edward IV and King Richard III. (Note: The Richard III Society subscribe to the alternative view that Mary of York was born at Waltham Abbey rather than Fotheringhay Castle.)

The local singer, Luciee-Marie Closier, who performed in series 3 of the talent show, The Voice, performed from the balcony of the town hall in November 2014. The town hall still remains the meeting place of Waltham Abbey Town Council.
