= Sewardstonebury =

Hamlet in Essex, England

Coordinates: 51.645°N 0.010°E

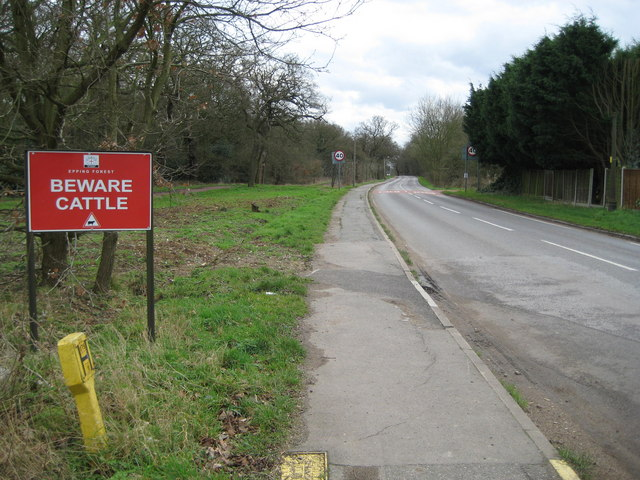

- Location within Essex
- OS grid reference: TQ390959
- District: Epping Forest
- Shire county: Essex
- Region: East
- Country: England
- Sovereign state: United Kingdom
- Post town: LONDON
- Postcode district: E4
- Dialling code: 020
- Police: Essex
- Fire: Essex
- Ambulance: East of England
- UK Parliament: Epping Forest

Sewardstonebury is a small hamlet within Epping Forest and district of Waltham Abbey, just north of the border with Chingford. It runs along Bury Road, which connects the northern part of Station Road in Chingford with the A112 Sewardstone Road.

It is located approximately 18 km (11 miles) northeast of Charing Cross, and surrounded by the forest. The nearest places are Chingford to the south and Sewardstone to the north. The area is completely residential (there are no shops, pub, or church) and most of the housing comprises very large, detached villas set in substantial grounds.

It contains the UK headquarters of the scouting movement, Gilwell Park, and the exclusive West Essex golf club is based in the hamlet.

No public transport services run through the area, although the nearest train station is Chingford, within walking distance.

== Nearest places ==
- Chingford
- Epping Forest
- Sewardstone
- High Beach
