= Sewrah Moor =

Hamlet in Cornwall, England

Coordinates: 50°11′40″N 5°10′41″W

Sewrah Moor is a hamlet in west Cornwall, England, United Kingdom. It lies just north of Stithians.
