= Harderwykenburg =

Coordinates: 53°13′47″N 7°26′54″E

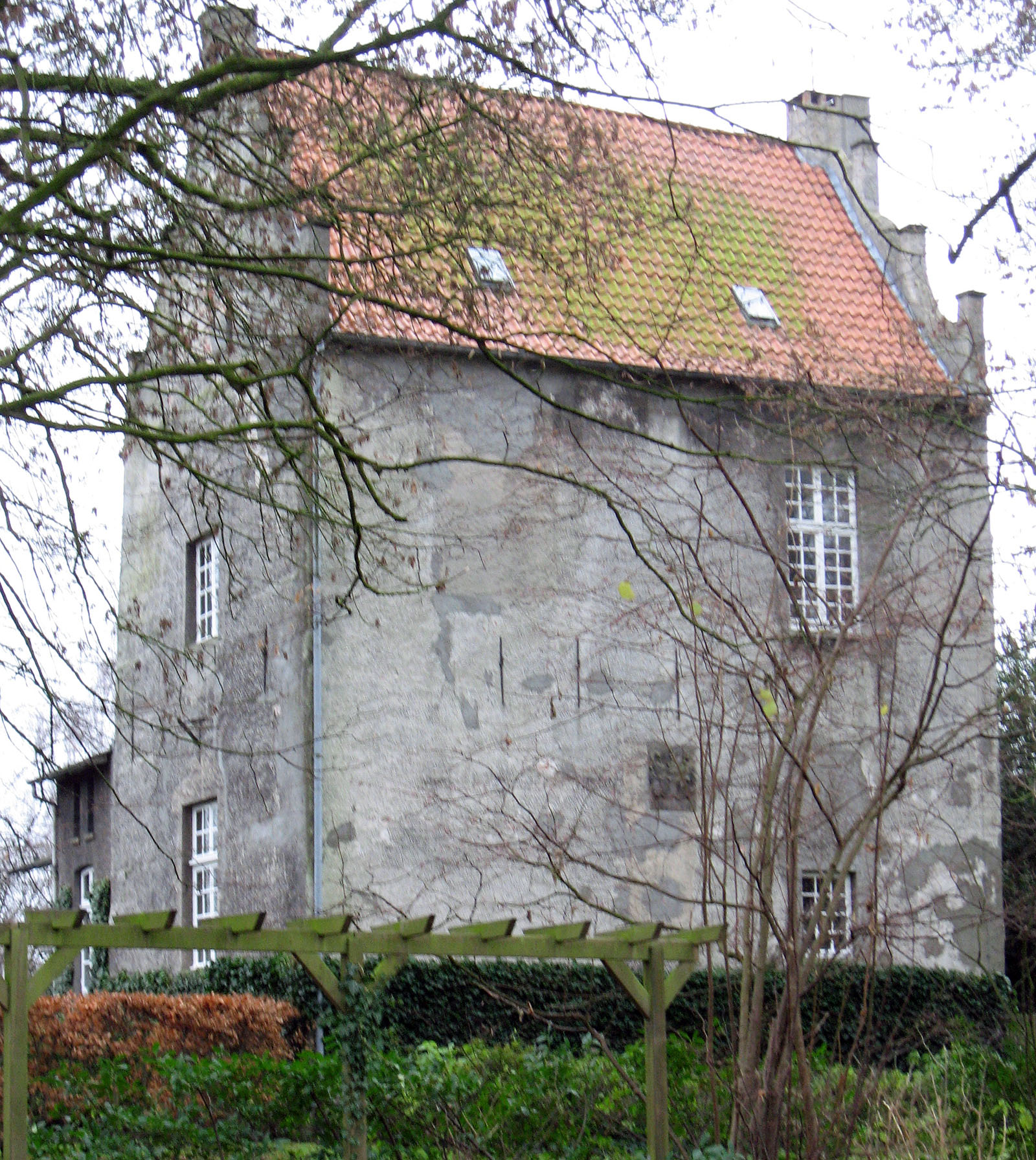
Harderwykenburg.

The Harderwykenburg is one of the oldest extant castles of East Frisia. It was built in the style of a medieval stone house soon after 1450 in Leer, Lower Saxony, Germany.

== History ==
The original building, in the form of a tower, was built of stones from a monastery, and measures 8.09 x 11.13 meters. The external walls are between 0.96 and 1.23 meters thick. The tower was later supplemented by a two-storey extension. The steeply proportioned building has now been not entirely satisfactorily restored.

The first owner of the castle was probably the chieftain Hayo Unken, on his mother's side a grandchild of the chieftain Focko Ukena. The castle was also known as the "Unkenburg", after Hayo's family name. In 1588 the steward (Drost) Dietrich Harderwyk Armgard married a daughter of Hayo Unken IV, and thus came into possession of the castle, which now bears his family name.

In 1788 possession of the building passed from the then owner, Carl Stephan von Schilling, to Carl Gustav, Baron zu Inn und Knyphausen, whose descendants continue to live there.
