= Selsted =

Hamlet in Kent, England

Coordinates: 51.1565°N 1.1715°E

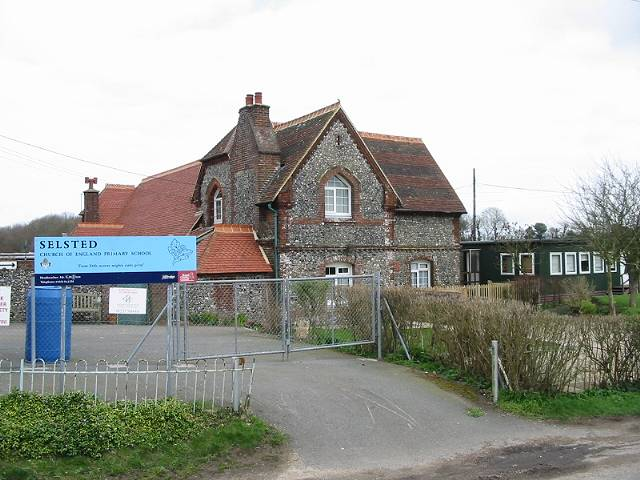
- Selsted CofE Primary School

- Location within Kent
- OS grid reference: TR2244
- District: Folkestone and Hythe
- Shire county: Kent
- Region: South East
- Country: England
- Sovereign state: United Kingdom
- Postcode district: CT15
- Dialling code: 01303
- Police: Kent
- Fire: Kent
- Ambulance: South East Coast
- UK Parliament: Folkestone and Hythe

Selsted is a hamlet in Kent, England. It is in the local government district of Folkestone and Hythe, and the electoral ward of North Downs East.

During 2006, protests were held against a proposed closure of Selsted Church of England Primary School by Kent County Council, however, the plan was abandoned in September 2006.

The village has a cricket team in Division 2 of the Kent Village League, and who were the 2007 Lords Ashford League Champions.
