= Sewardstone =

Hamlet in Essex, England

Coordinates: 51.6597°N 0.0017°E

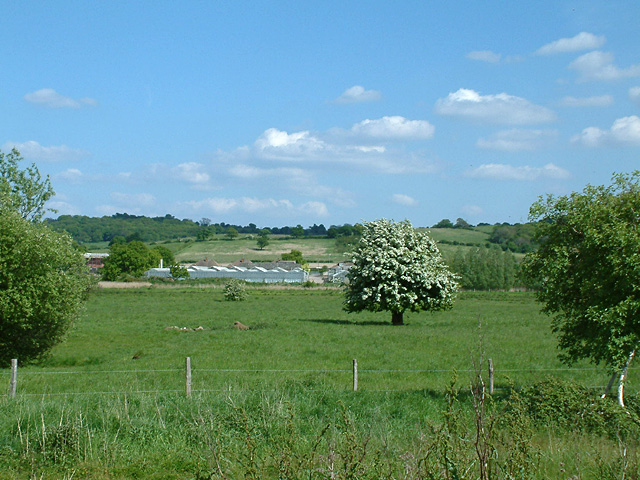
- Sewardstone Marsh is part of the Lee Valley Park

- Location within Essex
- OS grid reference: TQ385975
- Civil parish: Waltham Abbey
- District: Epping Forest
- Shire county: Essex
- Region: East
- Country: England
- Sovereign state: United Kingdom
- Post town: LONDON
- Postcode district: E4
- Dialling code: 020
- Police: Essex
- Fire: Essex
- Ambulance: East of England
- UK Parliament: Epping Forest

Sewardstone is a hamlet in the parish of Waltham Abbey, in the Epping Forest District of Essex, England. It is located south of the main built-up area of Waltham Abbey, lying between Epping Forest, Chingford and Enfield. It is 11.6 miles north-northeast of Central London and is in the London commuter belt.

== History ==
The name of the hamlet is derived from "Seward's ton", with 'ton' meaning a farmstead.

Settlement at Sewardstone could date back to the Iron Age, indicated by the discovery of a dugout canoe.

Sewardstone formed part of the ancient parish of Waltham Holy Cross. It was one of the four ancient subdivisions of the parish. (Note: Waltham Holy Cross was divided into the township of Waltham Abbey and the hamlets of Upshire, Holyfield, and Sewardstone.) Sewardstone was the only part of the parish of Waltham Holy Cross that had not formed part of the manor of Waltham and instead formed the Sewardstone manor. Waltham Abbey owned most of the land in the parish from the 12th century. The whole parish adopted the Public Health Act 1848 (11 & 12 Vict. c. 63) in 1850 which created the Waltham Holy Cross Local Board of Health. The hamlet was recorded as being 3,022 acres (12.23 km^{2}) in 1888.

In 1874 the Waltham school board built a school at Sewardstone with about 100 places. Attendance declined after the First World War and it closed in 1939.

In 1934, an area near Yardley House of 58 acres with a population of 23 (in 1931) was transferred from Sewardstone to Chingford.

In 2013 a new community of 119 homes was built at Gillwell Hill on the boundary with Chingford. The land was formerly used as kennels for the greyhound racing at Walthamstow Stadium.

== Governance ==
There are three tiers of local government for Sewardstone. The parish council is Waltham Abbey Town Council, the district council is Epping Forest District Council and the county council is Essex County Council.

== Geography ==
The area has scattered development, with large sections of open land. It is more or less linear, being centred on the A112 road (Sewardstone Road), which connects Waltham Abbey and Chingford. The King George V Reservoir and Sewardstone Marsh form the boundary with the London Borough of Enfield, to the west. There is a connection to Enfield Island Village by a footpath but not by road. A section of Epping Forest forms the boundary with the London Borough of Waltham Forest to the south, aside from in the southwest where the built-up area of Chingford extends into Sewardstone at Gilwell Hill. To the east is High Beach.

The headquarters of the world Scout movement, Gilwell Park, is in Sewardstone.

=== Nearest places ===
- Sewardstonebury
- High Beach
- Chingford
- Walthamstow
- Loughton
- Waltham Abbey

== Transport ==
To the south of the hamlet, London Buses Route 215 offers a frequent service from Lee Valley Camp Site to Walthamstow Central. The nearest railway station is Chingford Station, which is on the London Overground network and has frequent trains to London Liverpool Street Station. The nearest London Underground station is at Loughton on the Central Line and has frequent trains to both London and Epping.
