= Seathorne =

Village in Lincolnshire, England

Coordinates: 53.168387°N 0.350694°E

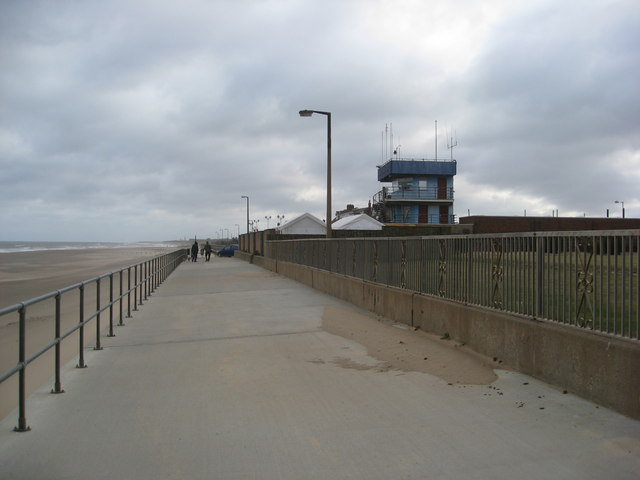
- Seathorne

- Location within Lincolnshire
- OS grid reference: TF562656
  - London: 115 mi (185 km) SSW
- District: East Lindsey
- Shire county: Lincolnshire
- Region: East Midlands
- Country: England
- Sovereign state: United Kingdom
- Post town: Skegness
- Postcode district: PE25
- Police: Lincolnshire
- Fire: Lincolnshire
- Ambulance: East Midlands
- UK Parliament: Boston and Skegness

Seathorne is a small coastal village in the East Lindsey district of Lincolnshire, England. It is situated approximately 2 miles (3.2 km) north from Skegness, and is adjacent to Winthorpe.

The area was developed in 1925, with the development of the Seathorne Estate.
