= Leer, Lower Saxony =

Leer
- Town
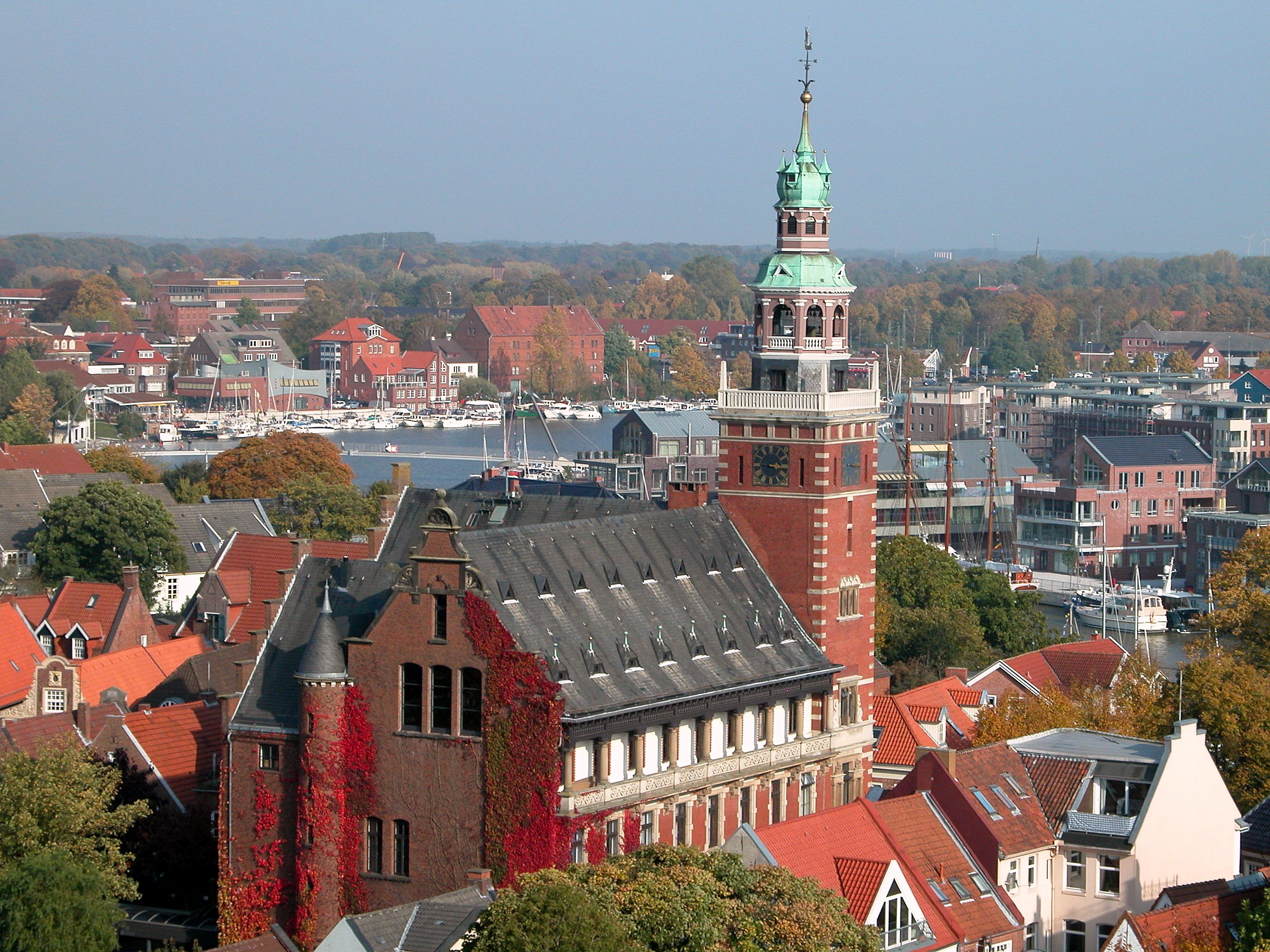
- View of town hall and harbor

- Flag Coat of arms

- Location of Leer within Leer district
- Interactive map of Leer
- Location within Germany Location within Lower Saxony
- Coordinates: 53°13′51″N 7°27′10″E
- Country: Germany
- State: Lower Saxony
- District: Leer
- Subdivisions: 9 Subdivisions

Government
  - Mayor (2021–26): Claus-Peter Horst (Ind.)

Area
  - Total: 70.11 km^{2} (27.07 sq mi)
- Elevation: 3 m (9.8 ft)

Population (2025-12-31)
  - Total: 34,277
  - Density: 488.9/km^{2} (1,266/sq mi)
- Time zone: UTC+01:00 (CET)
  - Summer (DST): UTC+02:00 (CEST)
- Postal codes: 26789
- Dialling codes: 0491
- Vehicle registration: LER
- Website: www.leer.de

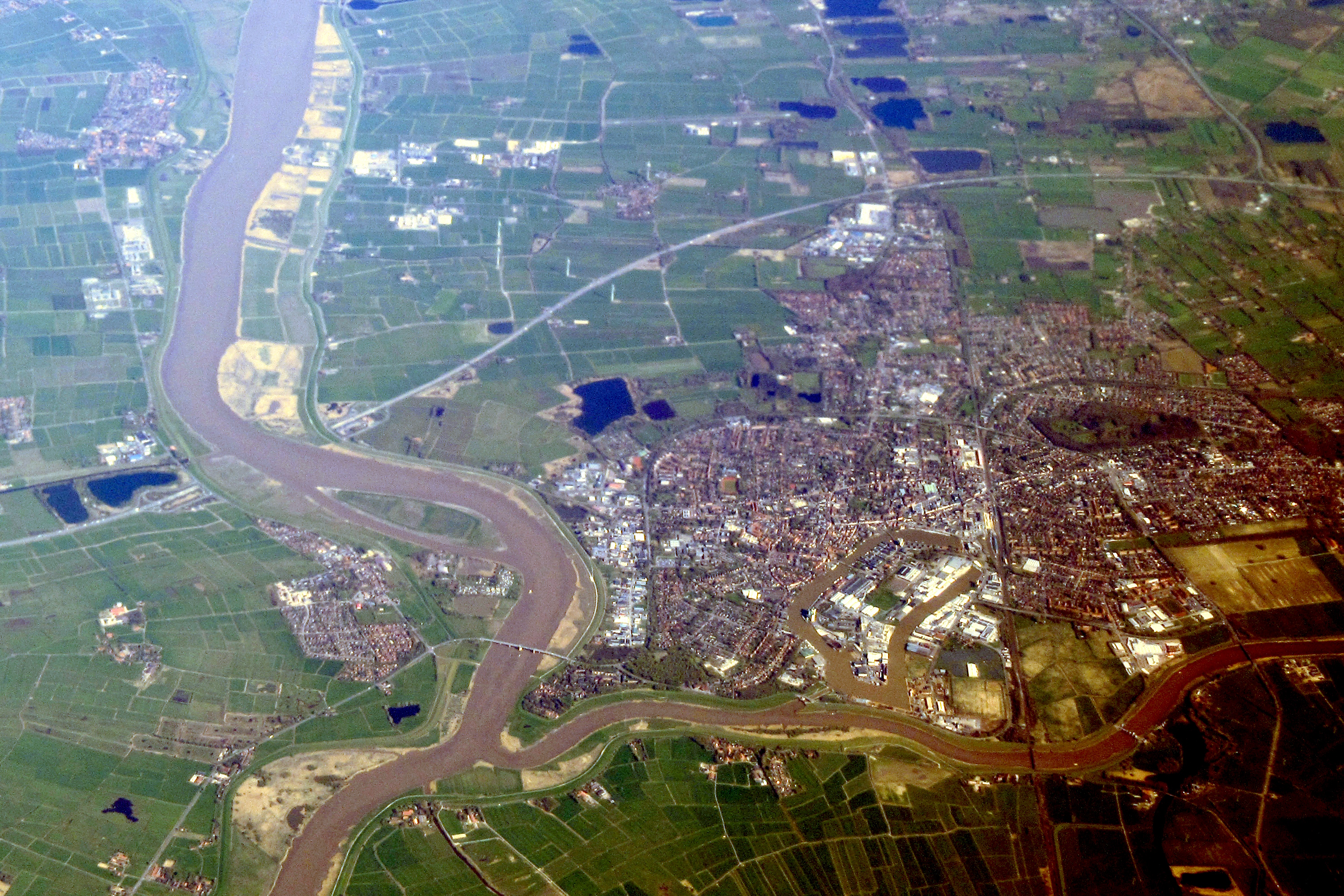
Aerial view of Leer

Leer (German pronunciation: [leːɐ̯]) is a town in the district of Leer in the region of East Frisia, in the northwestern part of Lower Saxony, Germany. It is situated on the river Leda, a tributary of the river Ems, near the border with the Netherlands. With 34,958 inhabitants (2021), it is the third-largest city in East Frisia after Emden and Aurich.

It has a railway and autobahn connection to Groningen, Netherlands, Emden, Bremen and the South (Rheine and the Ruhr industrial region).

== Geography ==
Leer had been a settlement long before it was first mentioned in written documents. Originally, the city was situated at a meander near the mouth of the river Leda into the Ems, which is still the center of the town today. Even though Leer is some 30 km (19 mi) away from the coast, it can be reached by large ships via the Ems. Leer lies close to the Dutch border; the district of Leer shares a border with the Dutch province of Groningen. The island and nature reserve of Bingumer Sand lies within the district.

== History ==
Historical affiliations

County of East Frisia 1464–1744
Kingdom of Prussia 1744–1806
(Netherlands) Kingdom of Holland 1806–1810
First French Empire 1810–1813
Kingdom of Prussia 1813–1815
Kingdom of Hanover 1815–1866
Kingdom of Prussia 1866–1871
German Empire 1871–1918
Weimar Republic 1918–1933
Nazi Germany 1933–1945
Allied-occupied Germany 1945–1949
West Germany 1949–1990
Germany 1990–present

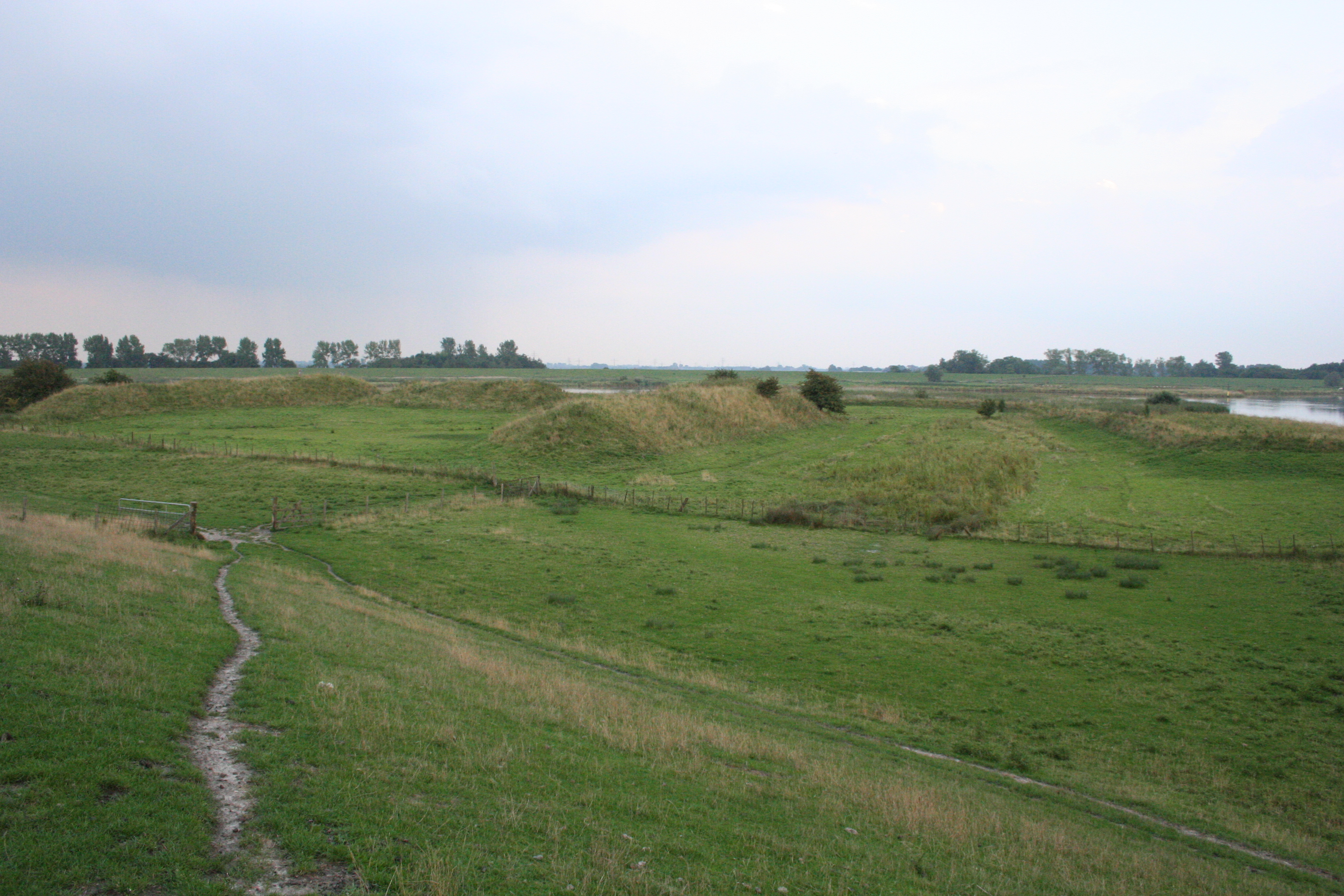
Remains of the Feste Leerort at the mouth of the Leda into the Ems river, 1453–1760

There are many traces of early settlements in the area, including crude flint tools that are dated back to roughly 3200 BCE.

In 791 CE Saint Ludger built the first chapel in East Frisia at the western edge of the settlement Leer, then still named Hleri after 'feetlot', 'willow'. This chapel is mentioned for the first time in a written document from 850 CE.

During the 14th and 15th centuries, Leer was hometown of the Ukena family, which was one most influential East-Frisian chieftain families of that time. The town profited from the trade with the Hanse, and the fortress Leerort was built.

In 1508, Count Edzard obtained the official right to host a market, which started the tradition of the Gallimarkt, which is now an annual fair. In 1744 East Frisia fell to Prussia, then ruled by Frederick the Great. Town privileges were awarded in 1823 by George IV, King of Hanover.

In 1854 Leer became connected to the Hannoversche Westbahn railway, which at that time connected Emden and Rheine in the Ruhr area. In 1856, the Westbahn was connected to the central German railway network.

Unlike Emden, Leer only suffered little damage by Allied bombing in World War II. The city was occupied by Canadian troops on 28 April 1945.

On 1 October 1955, Leer received the status of an independent city.

== Politics ==
Since 1964 the city's government has been led by the Social-Democratic Party SPD. The major opposition parties are the Christian Democratic Union Party CDU, the Green Party and the Allgemeine Wählergemeinschaft (AWG), an independent local party. The mayor of Leer is Claus-Peter Horst, elected in 2021.

The town council consists of (elections of 2016):

- SPD: 36.7% / 14 seats
- CDU: 27.9% / 11 seats
- AWG: 10.2% / 4 seats
- Grüne: 13.9% / 5 seats
- FDP: 3.0% / 1 seat
- The Left: 3.1% / 1 seat
- CDL: 3.5% / 1 seat
- BfL 1.3%: / 1 seat
- Haase 0.5%: / 0 seat

=== Mayors ===
Term of office	Mayor
1812–1814	Maire Willem Cramer von Baumgarten
1814–1842	Abraham Erlenholtz (till 1823 temporary)
1843–1852	Adolf Wilhelm Hillingh
1852–1857	Georg Heinrich Leonhard Schow
1857–1888	Julius Pustau
1888–1913	August Dieckmann
1914–1917	City counsel Gerhard Tschackert (temporary)
1917–1920	Emil Helms
1920–1933	Erich vom Bruch
1933–1945	Erich Drescher
1945–1946	Albrecht Graf von Wedel
1946	Johann Epkes
1946	Hermann Uebel
1946–1948	Louis Thelemann
1948–1950	Ernst Stendel
1950–1964	Hermann Uebel
1964–1968	Friedrich Geerdes
1968	Heinrich Klasen
1968–1973	Horst Milde
1973–2001	Günther Boekhoff
2001–2014	Wolfgang Kellner (independent)
2014–2021	Beatrix Kuhl (CDU)
2021–incumbent	Claus-Peter Horst (independent)

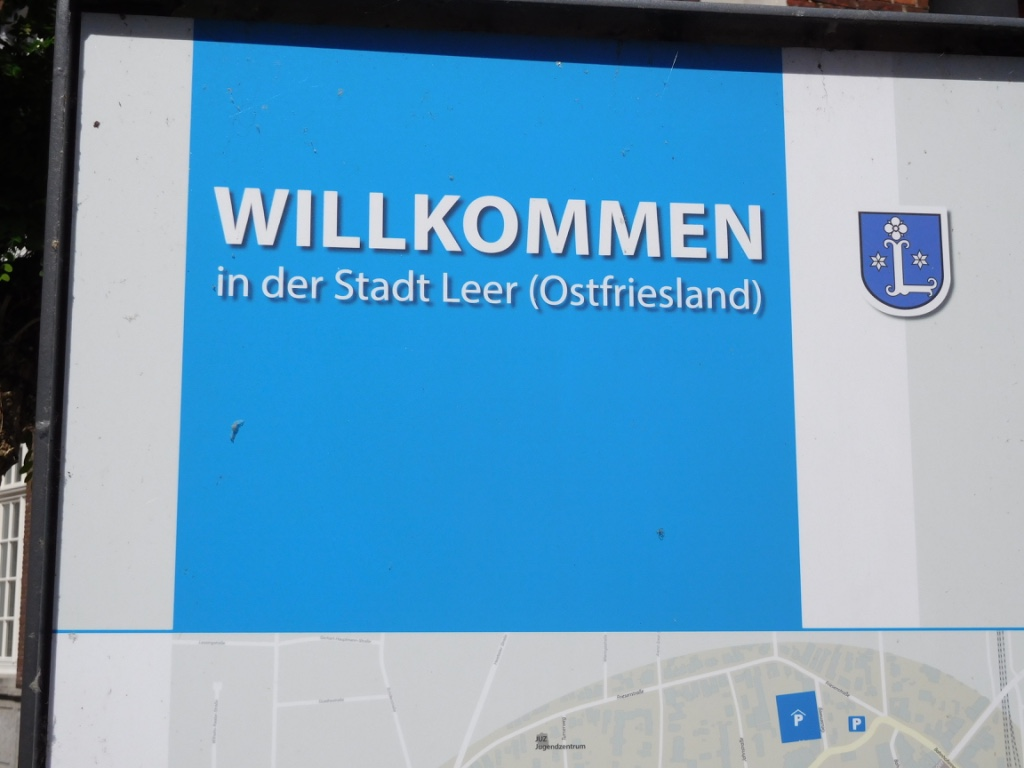
Welcome to the City of Leer, East Frisia

== Notable buildings ==
- Harderwykenburg
- Haneburg
- Evenburg
- Philippsburg (Castle)
- Telecommunication tower Leer-Nüttermoor (height: 160 m or 520 ft)
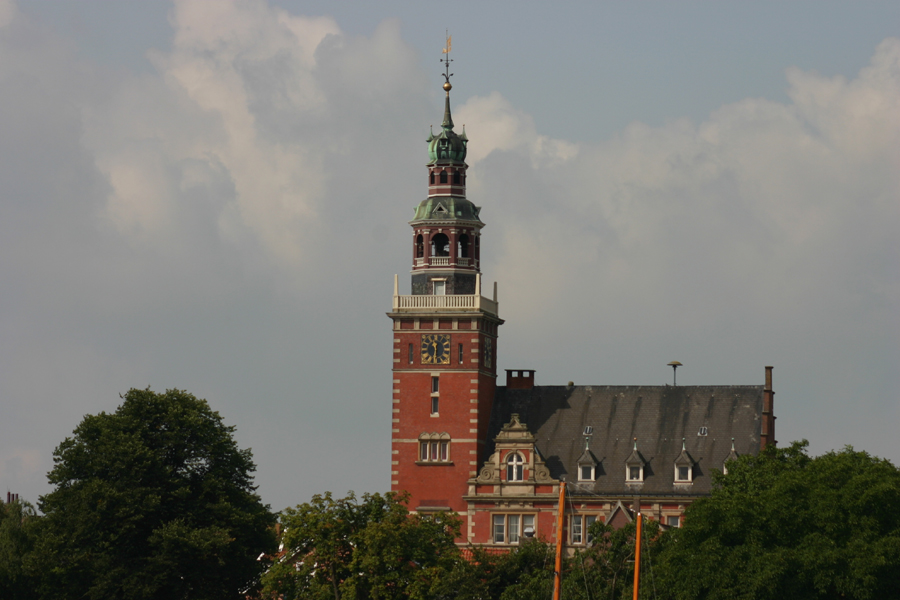
City hall in Leer

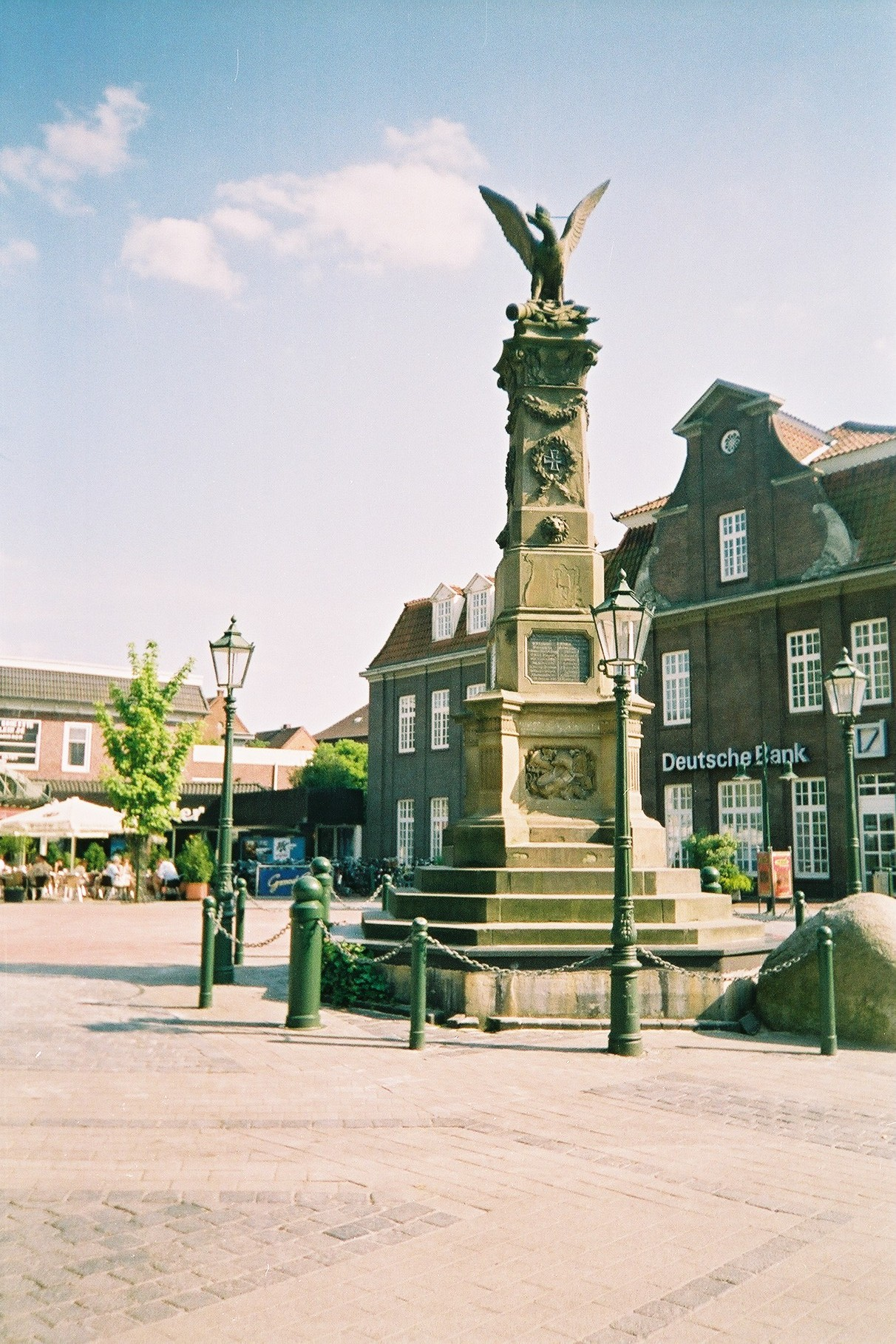
City centre in Leer

== Religion ==
Leer is a traditional Protestant city and home to both the Lutheran and Reformed churches. The German Reformed Church has its head office in Leer. Furthermore, Leer offers an unusually large variety of smaller religious communities, especially Baptists, Mennonites, Methodists, Adventists and Mormons. Even though Eastern Frisia is a mainly a Protestant region, there is a small Roman Catholic community in Leer.

== Economics and infrastructure ==
Two autobahns (freeways) cross north of Leer, the A 28 (Leer – Bremen) and the A 31 (Emden – Oberhausen, Ruhr Area). The city itself has three junctions to the autobahns. Leer railway station is a relay station between Groningen and Bremen in the west–east direction and the South and Emden harbour (with a large VW factory and shipping facilities) in the north. The airfield Leer-Papenburg north of the city offers limited passenger flights to nearby airfields, most notably the East Frisian Islands. The closest international airport is Bremen Airport.

Leer is home to many German shipping companies – about 20 per cent of the German merchant fleet are registered in Leer. The Bünting group Home is based in Leer and is one of the city's main employers. Although Bünting owns several German supermarket chains, the company is best known for their tea, which is available all over Germany.

Each year in autumn the Gallimarkt is held. Traditionally a cattle-market, the Gallimarkt is now one of the largest fairs in Northwest Germany.

== Education ==
In Leer there are seven primary schools and numerous secondary schools. The two gymnasiums, Telletta-Gross-Gymnasium and Ubbo-Emmius-Gymnasium, educate more than 1,500 pupils each and are two of the largest grammar schools in Lower Saxony. The Navigation School is now a faculty of the Hochschule Emden – Leer (University of applied science). The town also offers education at two vocational schools.

== Twin towns – sister cities ==
Leer is twinned with:

- Elbląg, Poland
- Trowbridge, United Kingdom

== Notable people ==
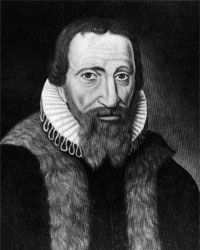
Ubbo Emmius, c. 1605

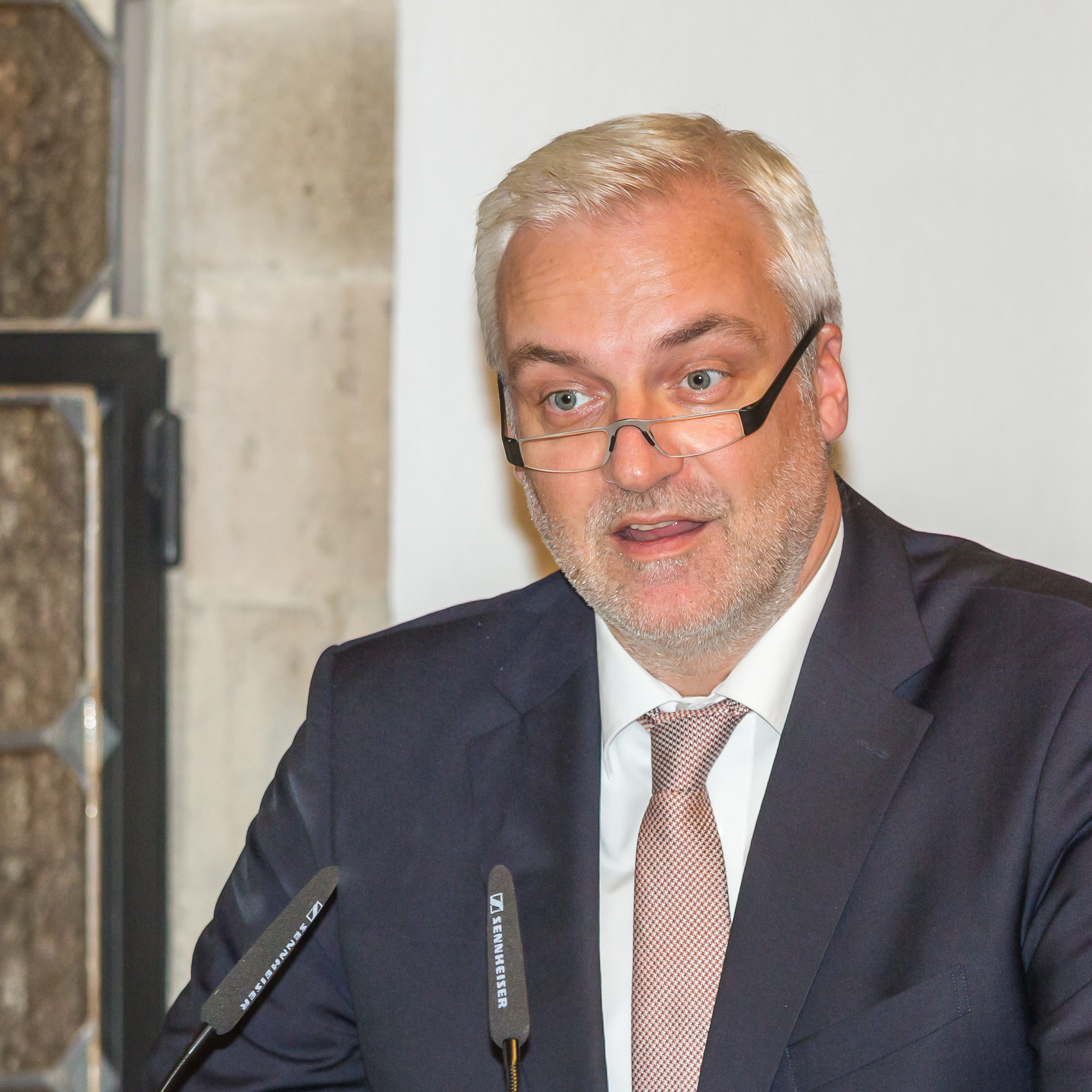
Garrelt Duin, 2018

- Focko Ukena (1370–1436), East Frisian chieftain
- Ubbo Emmius (1547–1625), theologian, geographer and historian from the University of Groningen
- Gustaaf Willem van Imhoff (1705–1750), governor-general of Dutch East India
- Petrus Hofstede de Groot (1802–1886), Dutch theologian.
- Johann Ludwig Hinrichs (1818–1901), co-founder of the German Baptists
- Onno Klopp (1822–1903), publicist and historian.
- Wilhelmine Siefkes (1890–1984), writer of Low German
- Bernhard Bavink (1879–1947), Natural philosopher and scientist
- Ernst Reuter (1889–1953), politician and municipal scientist, mayor of West-Berlin 1948–1953, brought up locally
- Hermann Lange (1912–1943), priest killed by Nazis
- Marron Curtis Fort (1938–2019), linguist and curator of Low German and Frisian languages, lived locally
- Karl Dall (1941–2020), presenter, singer and comedian; gained his apprenticeship locally
- Friedel Grützmacher (born 1942), politician of Alliance 90/The Greens
- H.P. Baxxter (born 1964), singer of the band Scooter
- Garrelt Duin (born 1968), former local and national politician (SPD)
- Ulf Thiele (born 1971), politician (CDU)
- Ilka Groenewold (born 1985), TV presenter, singer and amateur athlete
- Alfred Hartmann, Kapitan, owner of Hartmann Group.

=== Sport ===
- Okka Rau (born 1977), beach volleyball player
- Christina Hennings (born 1984), rower
- Tobias Steffen (born 1992), footballer who has played over 250 games
