= Cheshunt Hockey Club =

English field hockey club

Cheshunt
- Full name: Cheshunt Hockey Club
- Ground: Turnford School, Cheshunt, Hertfordshire, England
Home colours	Away colours

Cheshunt Hockey Club are a field hockey club based in Cheshunt, Hertfordshire, England. The club trains and plays on an astroturf pitch at Turnford School and has its clubhouse at the Wormley Sports Club. The club has four adults teams, the men playing in the East Hockey League system and the ladies playing in the 5 Counties League system.

== History ==
Cheshunt Ladies have been in existence since pre-war and were originally based at Grundy Park, Cheshunt. In 1972, the club moved base to the Cheshunt Club, Albury Ride, Cheshunt. In 1974 the Men's Section was formed. In 1997, the two respective sections of Cheshunt Club merged to become The Cheshunt Hockey Club.

== Teams ==
=== Season 09-10 ===
Men's 1st XI: East League 4SW
Men's 2nd XI: East League 7SW
Men's 3rd XI: East League 9SW
Ladies' 1st XI: 5 Counties Division One
Ladies' 2nd XI:
