= Rags Brook =

River in Hertfordshire, England

Coordinates: 51.71361°N 0.04909°W

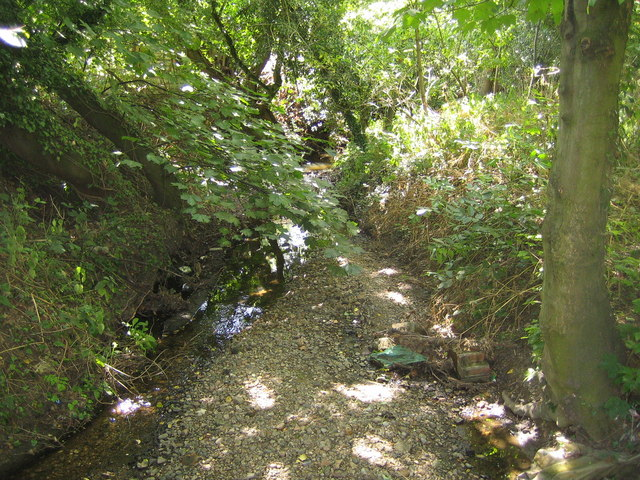
Rags Brook Tributary in Goff's Oak

Rags Brook is a tributary of the Small River Lea, which is a tributary of the River Lea. Rags Brook rises in the hills between Goffs Oak Cuffley in Hertfordshire, England. Brookfield Lane follows the course of the brook and the Brookfield Centre reflects the brook in its name.

The highest river level recorded at Rosedale Way, Cheshunt was 1.69 metres (5 ft 7 in), which it reached on 12 July 2021.

The brook runs through Cuffley and Cheshunt before converging with Turnford Brook in the area known as Cheshunt Wash, before joining the Small River Lea. The brook, notably runs through the neighbourhood of Hastings Avenue. A pavement goes directly over the river. Embankments have been made on this river, due to it being a flood risk for the neighbouring sectors of Cheshunt, including, Flamstead End and Rosedale.
