= Turnford Brook =

Stream in Hertfordshire, England

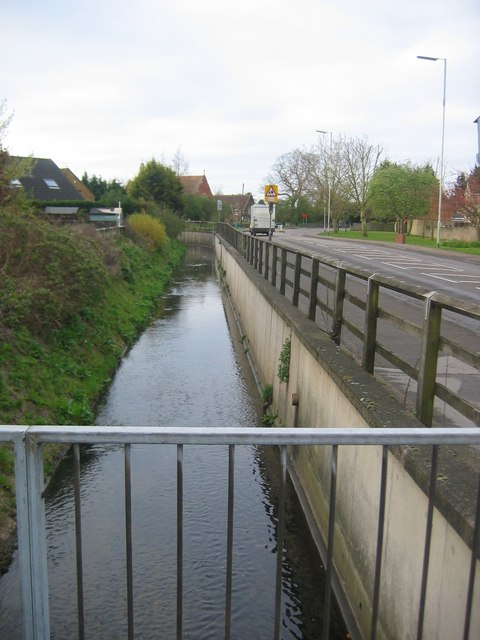
Turnford Brook at Turnford

Turnford Brook is a minor tributary of the River Lea. The brook flows through the Borough of Broxbourne for approximately 3 miles (5 km).

== Course ==
The brook rises close to the Wormley-Hoddesdonpark Wood South SSSI 51.7317°N 0.0928°W and flows easterly through open countryside and is joined by the Wormleybury Brook before passing under the A10 and the New River at the Turnford aqueduct and the A1170. The brook then flows in a southerly direction through a culvert alongside the B176 road at Cheshunt Wash. After merging with Rags Brook the brook flows easterly under the West Anglia Main Line to quickly join the Small River Lea in the River Lee Country Park at Cheshunt 51.7147°N 0.0207°W.
