= Hertford Regional College =

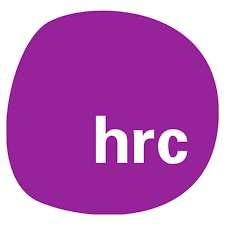

Location
- Scotts Road; Ware, Hertfordshire, SG12 9JF; England

Information
- Type: Further Education
- Established: 1991
- Local authority: East Hertfordshire
- Department for Education URN: 130722 Tables
- Ofsted: Reports
- Chairman of the Governors: Mike Carver
- Principal: Tony Medhurst
- Gender: Mixed
- Age: 16+
- Website: http://www.hrc.ac.uk/

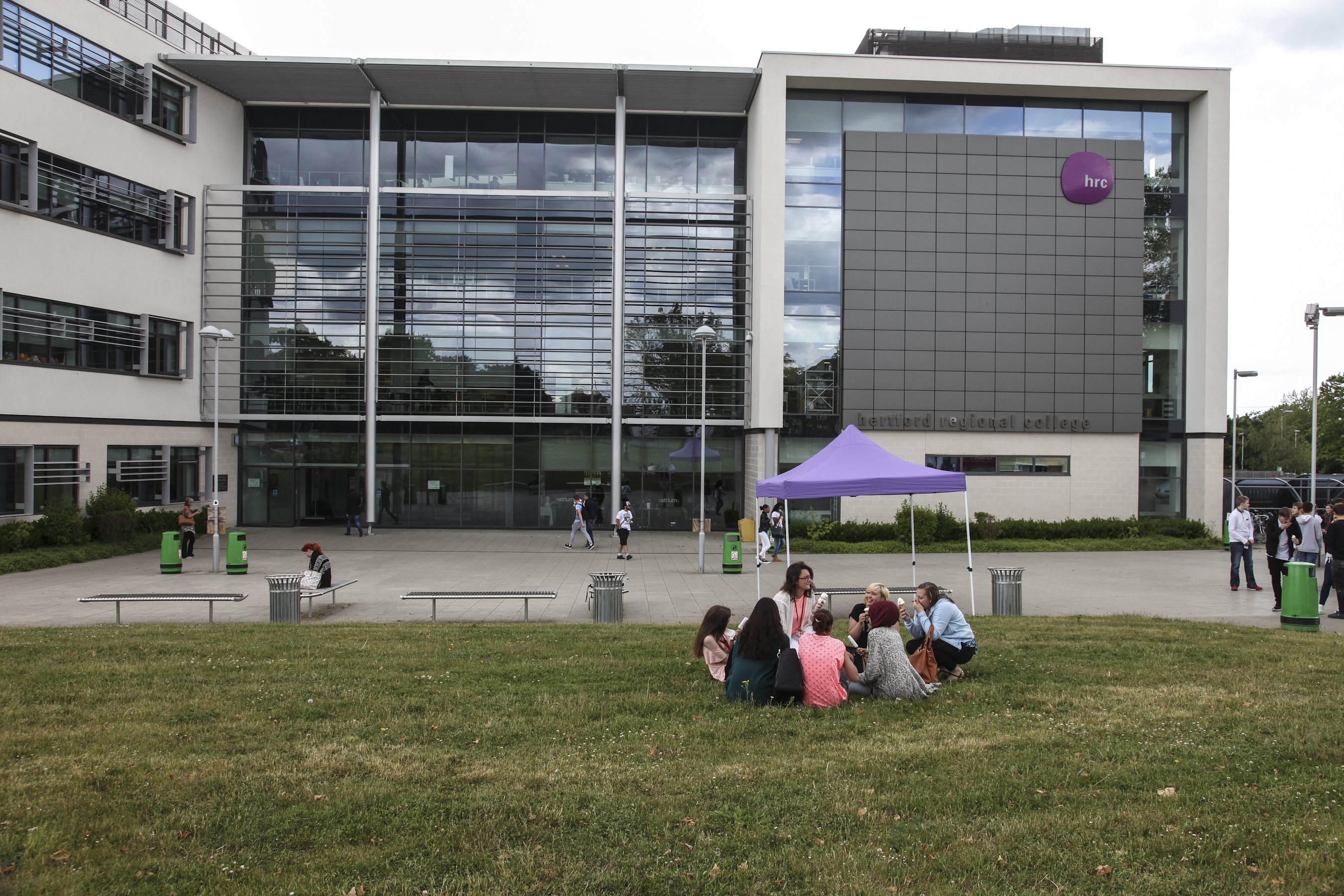
Hertford Regional College - Broxbourne Campus External View

Hertford Regional College (HRC) is a further education college located over two sites in Hertfordshire, England.

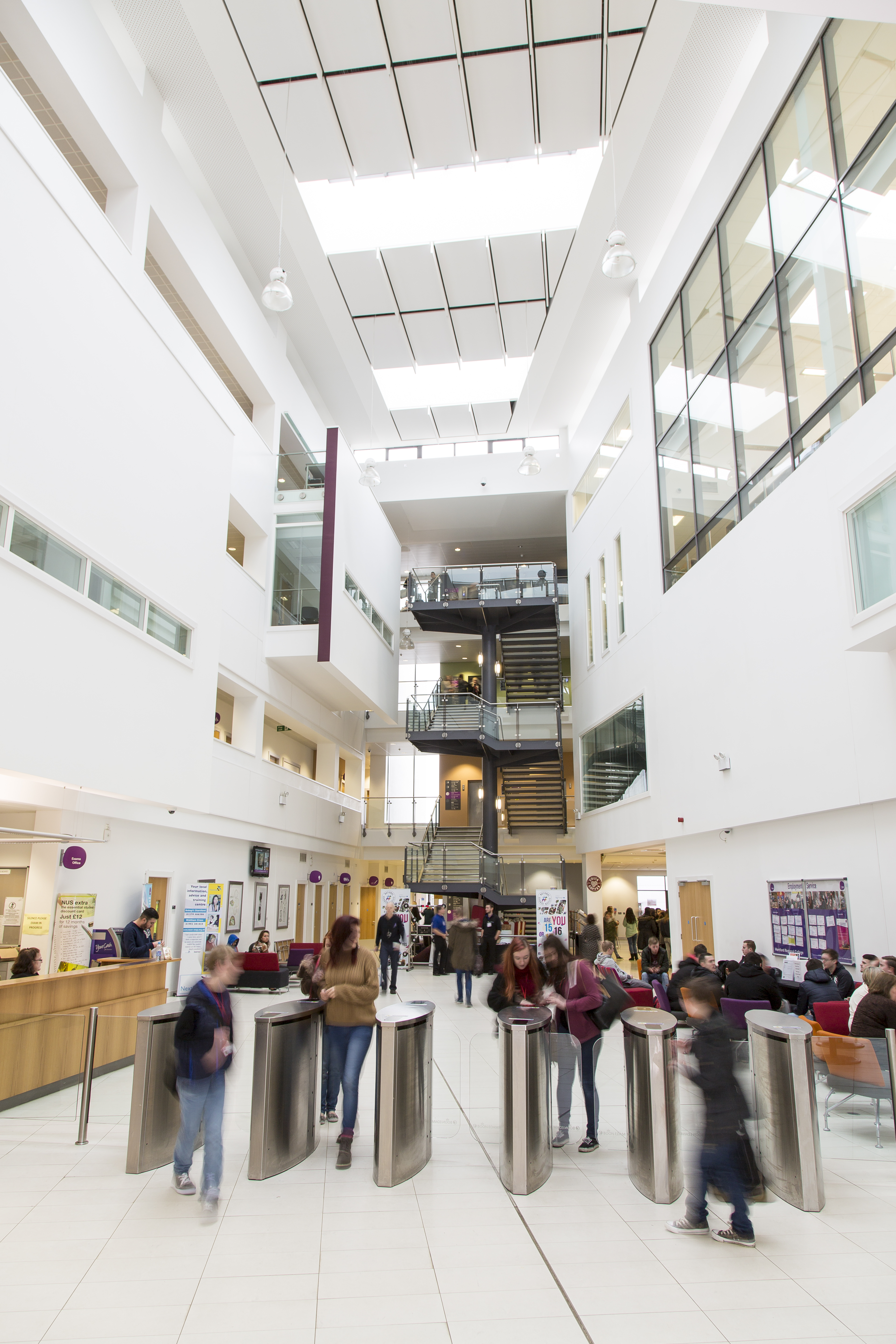
Hertford Regional College - Broxbourne Campus Atrium Area

== History ==
Hertford Regional College (HRC) was formed from the merger of Ware College and East Herts College in 1991. Today, the College is based at two sites in Hertfordshire at Turnford (51.7247°N 0.0244°W) and at Ware (51.8074°N 0.0312°W).

== About the College ==
HRC offers a range of full-time study programmes, apprenticeships, higher education qualifications and part-time courses. Courses are designed to prepare students for progression to their chosen career - whether that be directly from the college or after further/higher education.

Subjects taught include Art and Design, Business, Catering, Hairdressing, Performing Arts, Sports, Teacher Training and more. There is a dedicated building at the Ware Campus at which specialist programmes are delivered for students with learning difficulties and disabilities.

A proportion of HRC's Higher Education qualifications are validated by universities, including the University of Hertfordshire and the University of Greenwich.

In 2015, HRC partnered with Tottenham Hotspur Football Club to create a Football Development Centre, combining academic and sporting qualifications. This partnership offers students the opportunity to train at Tottenham Hotspur's official training ground and be taught by experienced coaches.

== Campuses and Facilities ==
The college has two campuses, one located in Broxbourne and one in Ware.

=== Ware ===
The Ware campus is home to the Creative Arts and Enterprise building. The campus offers training in subjects including Fine Art, Photography, Visual Merchandising, Graphic and 3D Design, Games Design and Hair, Beauty and Media Make-Up.

==== Inspires Salon ====
The college's Inspires Salon features five hairdressing salons and six beauty salons. It is open to the public.

=== Broxbourne ===
The Broxbourne campus houses all of the college's STEM facilities, including Engineering, Motor Vehicle, Construction and Electrical workshops, as well as Science laboratories. Also on this campus are the Michael Morpurgo Theatre, TV and recording studios, Childcare and Health & Social Care suites, gym and sports hall and a JetBlue air cabin – an 18-seat aircraft cabin which has been lifted straight from a real British Airways plane.

==== Atrium Restaurant ====
The Atrium Restaurant is a student-run restaurant, open to the public, found on the Broxbourne campus. It serves modern European cuisine and is rated the #1 restaurant in Broxbourne on TripAdvisor.

== Alumni ==
- Maggie Alphonsi, international rugby player
- George Ezra, musician
- Marcus Graham, actor
