= Cheshunt Great House =

Information regarding the manor house

- Location within Hertfordshire

General information
- Location: Cheshunt, Hertfordshire, England
- Coordinates: 51.7071°N 0.0544°W
- Completed: Late 15th century
- Demolished: 1965

Cheshunt Great House was a manor house in the town of Cheshunt, Hertfordshire, England, near to Waltham Abbey. It is said to have been built by King Henry VIII for Cardinal Thomas Wolsey. The family seat of the Shaw family for over a century, by the late 19th century it was used as a Freemasons Hall and was later used during World War II. After the war, the hall was too costly to run and was opened to the public until a fire gutted it in 1965. It had been made a Grade II listed building on 11 June 1954.

== History ==
The site had been a late medieval courtyard building, the residence of the manor of Andrews. The house was built in the latter part of the 15th century and was two storeys high with a tiled roof. Cardinal Thomas Wolsey owned the manor from 1519 until 1529.

By the 18th century, the manor was owned by the Shaw family. In 1750, lord of the manor, William Shaw, saw that the exterior of the house was encased in Georgian brick and expanded, except the north front. In 1801, much of the house was in a state where it needed to be demolished, and around 1820 the south side was demolished by John Shaw, who was the owner around this time.

In the late 19th century, the house was used on several occasions for conferences. On 8 July 1876, the Provincial Grand Lodge of Hertfordshire was held at the manor, and until the 1930s it served as a Freemasons hall. In 1906, Cheshunt Great House and its 3 acres (1.2 ha) of land were put on the market for roughly £2,000, which was later reduced to £900. It was purchased by Great House Co. Ltd, although most of the lodgers bought shares in the company. From August 1939 until 1944, the house was used for wartime requirements. After World War II, Cheshunt Great House was considered too expensive to renovate and was opened to the public until destroyed by fire in 1965. It was excavated in 1969. Later, the site was turned into a landscaped garden.

== Structure ==
The hallway

In an early 18th-century print of the house, it was quadrangular, inclosing a courtyard, and there was some evidence that a wing had been removed from the north end of the west front. The south, west, and east fronts of the house still remained in the early 20th century and were built of plain red brick with tiled roofs. The south front entrance of the building had a four-centred stone arch with a very large round arched window above it which was dated to around 1850. The bases of three diagonal brick chimneys are believed to have dated to the early 17th century.

Cheshunt Great House had a large hallway and basement; the hallway received some light from built-up windows in the west wall. The main entrance door opened directly into the south end of the old hall. The hall measured 37 feet 6 inches long by 24 feet 6 inches wide and was paved with square slabs of black and white marble with a stone fireplace and 18th-century panelling. A portrait and heraldry hung above the fireplace. The ceiling was adorned with carved corbels, representing angels holding shields with two human heads. A doorway at the north-west corner of the hall led to a corridor which led to an oak staircase dated to around 1750, with three balusters to each step.

The kitchen was located in the room to the north of the hallway, with a lath and plaster. The adjacent room featured a large, placid-looking fireplace, with the ceiling above supported by three old oak beams supported by a 15-inch-diameter (380 mm) circular pier without capitals in the centre. In 1912 it was reported that one of the piers had been replaced by a simple wooden post. Two windows were located in the east wall, with two openings in the south wall. At the western end was a vaulted passage, which by the early 20th century had been partially bricked up. A fireplace was located in the north wall, with moulded four-centred arch and jambs. The upper floor to the hall was relatively placid, with little of note except for an 18th-century fireplace.

== See also ==
- Destruction of country houses in 20th-century Britain
- St Mary the Virgin, Cheshunt
- Theobalds Palace
- Cheshunt
