= Turnford, Hertfordshire =

Village in Hertfordshire, England

Turnford
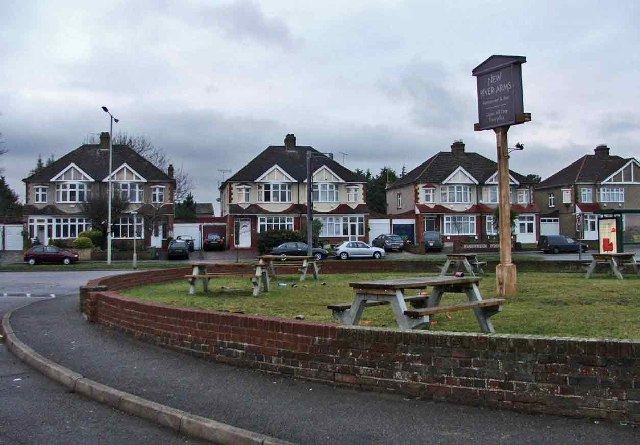
- High Road, Turnford

- Location within Hertfordshire
- Population: 8146 with Wormley
- OS grid reference: TL3639204404
- District: Broxbourne
- Shire county: Hertfordshire
- Region: East
- Country: England
- Sovereign state: United Kingdom
- Post town: Broxbourne
- Postcode district: EN10
- Dialling code: 01992
- Police: Hertfordshire
- Fire: Hertfordshire
- Ambulance: East of England
- UK Parliament: Broxbourne

Turnford is a village in the Borough of Broxbourne, in Hertfordshire, England, in an area generally known as the Lee Valley. It is bounded by Wormley to the north, Cheshunt to the south and west, and its eastern boundary is formed largely by the Lee Navigation. Central London at Charing Cross is approximately 18 miles (29 km) south. At the 2001 census, together with Wormley, the village had a population of 8,146 in 3,399 households.

== History ==
Turnford lies in a site where evidence of Palaeolithic, Late Bronze Age and Iron Age relics have been recorded. By the late Saxon period the village existed as a farm belonging to the manor of Cheshunt. A Benedictine nunnery was established in the 12th century on Turnford Marsh. Part of the medieval buildings survived within a farm until gravel quarrying destroyed the remains in 1955. Turnford remained a hamlet up to the 19th century until the nursery industry began to move out of North London in the 1880s. Growers including Thomas Rochford grew grapes, tomatoes, cucumbers and other items. By the late 20th century this industry had moved away to be replaced by housing estates where Thomas Rochford Way and Rochford Close are a reminder of the area's horticultural past.

== Etymology ==
The name Turnford appears to have Saxon origins and is probably a compound of Old English tun and ford - the ford by the farm.

== The village today ==
Much of Turnford due to its good transport links and close proximity to London is given over to residential development. However, its western boundary is mostly rural and to the east includes the Turnford and Cheshunt Pits a SSSI located in the Lee Valley Park.

Amenities include a selection of retail outlets, essential services, two public houses including the Grade II listed Bull's Head Inn. and is home to Haileybury Turnford (formerly Turnford School) and the Hertford Regional College.

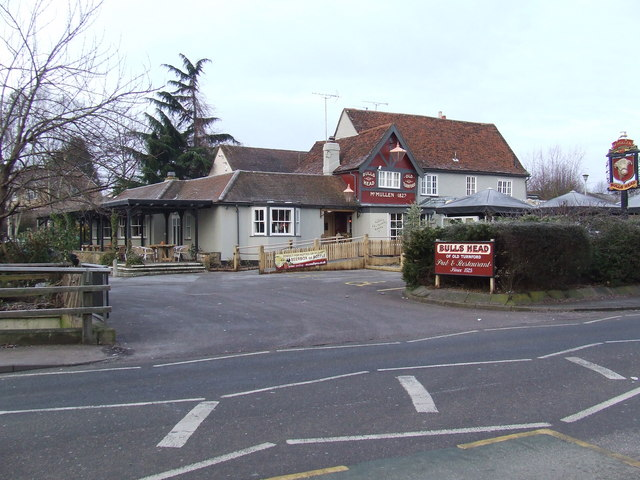
Bull's Head Inn

In 2014, the area of Wormley & Turnford was awarded £1m from the Big Local Trust to invest in the community over the next 10 years. Completely resident volunteer led, it will enable locals to regenerate their community.

== Watercourses ==
Passing under the A10 road from west to east Turnford Brook a River Lea tributary flows in a culvert alongside the High Road, Turnford before flowing under the West Anglia railway line to merge with the Small River Lea in the River Lee Country Park. Accessed from the New River Path the Turnford Pumping Station built in 1870 stands close to the man-made New River. The building houses a unique stationary steam engine built by Boulton and Watt in 1845. Forming a boundary between Hertfordshire and Essex the Lee Navigation flows in a southerly direction on Turnford's eastern fringe. Pedestrian and cycle access from the B176, Cheshunt Wash 51.715°N 0.0221°W links to the towpath of the river to join the Lee Valley Walk.

== Public transport ==
West Anglia Main Line railway stations Cheshunt and Broxbourne are both approximately 2 miles (3.2 km) distant. Bus routes that serve the village include the 310, 25, 907 and 907A. There are plans to open a new railway station in Turnford. As part of the Broxbourne Local Plan by the Borough of Broxbourne and Hertfordshire County Council, "the proposed station would [provide] access to Hertford Regional College and also serve the Brookfield development. The new station is proposed to be located at a site between the Regional College and Groom Road, with access provided from the Turnford High Road/The Springs roundabout through the college car park and along the undeveloped strip of land between Robinia Road/Sorbus Road to the north and Landau Way/Tarpan Way to the South." The plans also include the opening of Park Plaza North station between Turkey Street and Theoblads Grove, and the four-tracking of the West Anglia Main Line.

== Governance ==
The village together with Wormley form one of ten electoral wards in the Broxbourne constituency.

== Notable people ==
Footballer Ossie Ardiles lived in the village whilst playing for Tottenham Hotspur in the 1970s and 1980s.
