= Burnt Farm Cottage =

Historic building in Hertfordshire, England

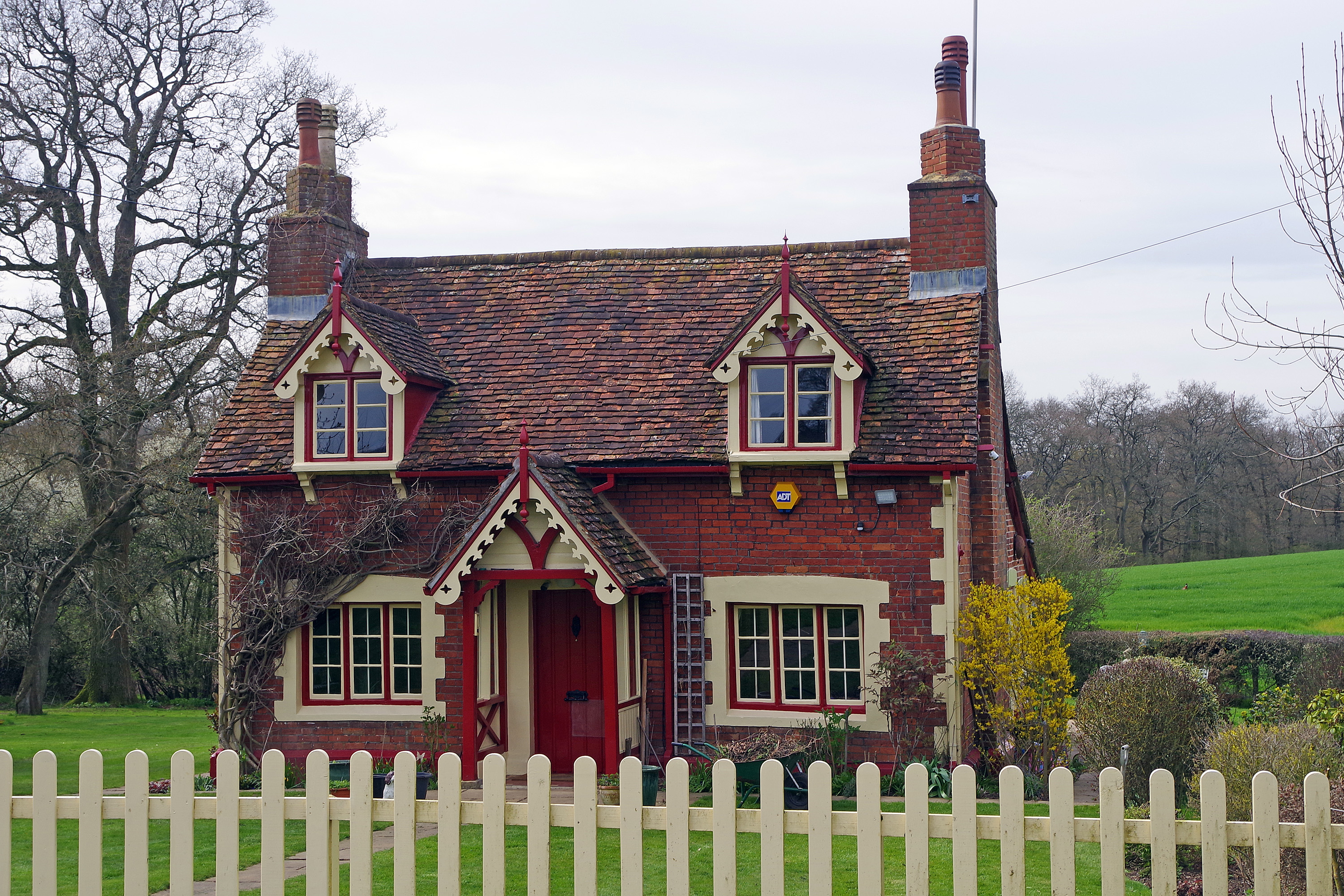
- The building in 2023

- Location within the United Kingdom Location within England Location within Hertfordshire
- 51.69492°N 0.09821°W
- Location: Cheshunt, England

History
- Built: c. 1840 (186 years ago)

Site notes
- Area: Hertfordshire

Listed Building – Grade II
- Designated: 8 November 1983
- Reference no.: 1073151

Burnt Farm Cottage is an historic building in Cheshunt, Hertfordshire, England. Standing on the western side of Burntfarm Ride, just north of Cuffley Brook, it dates to around 1840. It became a Grade II listed structure on 8 November 1983.

The brick cottage has painted cement quoins and a tiled roof. It is one storey, with dormer windows. The ground-floor windows have three lights and three-pane casements. The vertical panel door stands in a gabled wooden porch. The porch has curved pediment brackets.

The gabled dormer windows have been renovated. The chimney stacks, which are exposed on each side of the cottage, have paired diagonal shafts.
