= Cheshunt Park =

Park in Hertfordshire, England

Coordinates: 51.7167°N 0.04575°W

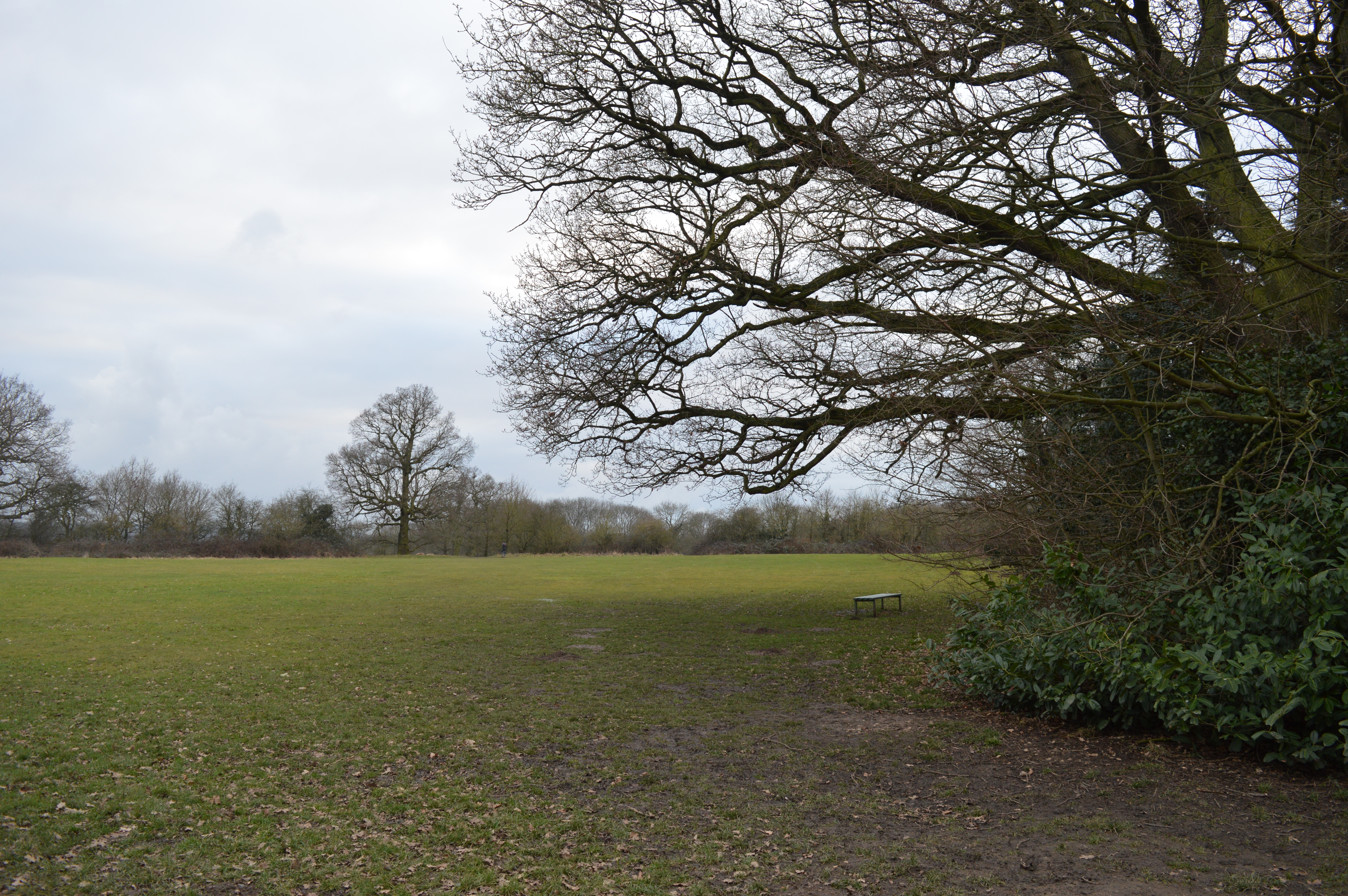

Cheshunt Park is a 40 hectare public park and Local Nature Reserve in Cheshunt in Hertfordshire. (Note: The Natural England page of the site is wrongly headed "Chestnut Park", but it refers to the "Friends of Cheshunt Park" and the map is correctly labelled) It is owned and managed by Broxbourne Borough Council.

The park is crossed by the course of the Roman Ermine Street. The park was originally part of the manor of Cheshunt, and there is mention of a park belonging to that manor from as early as 1339. By the 16th century, Cheshunt Park was in separate ownership. In 1795, a mansion called Brantyngeshaye was built at Cheshunt Park. The house subsequently also became known as Cheshunt Park after the park in which it stood. The house was demolished in 1970.

The park has grass and woodland which has ancient hedgerows, wildflower meadows, a pond and an orchard which is cropped by traditional cattle breeds. It has car parking, a playground, toilets and a café.

There is access from Park Lane.
