= Small River Lea =

Coordinates: 51.686°N 0.0179°W

The Small River Lea is a minor tributary of the River Lea, which flows through the Lee Valley Park between Cheshunt and Enfield Lock. It forms part of the Turnford and Cheshunt Pits Site of Special Scientific Interest (SSSI) as it flows through the River Lee Country Park.

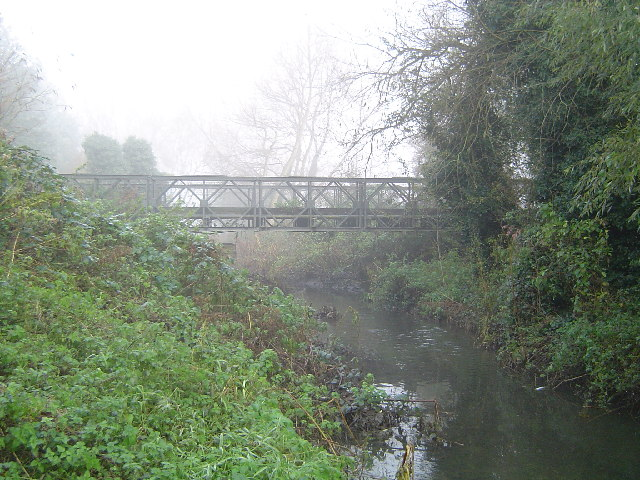
The Small River Lea at Cheshunt spanned by a Bailey bridge

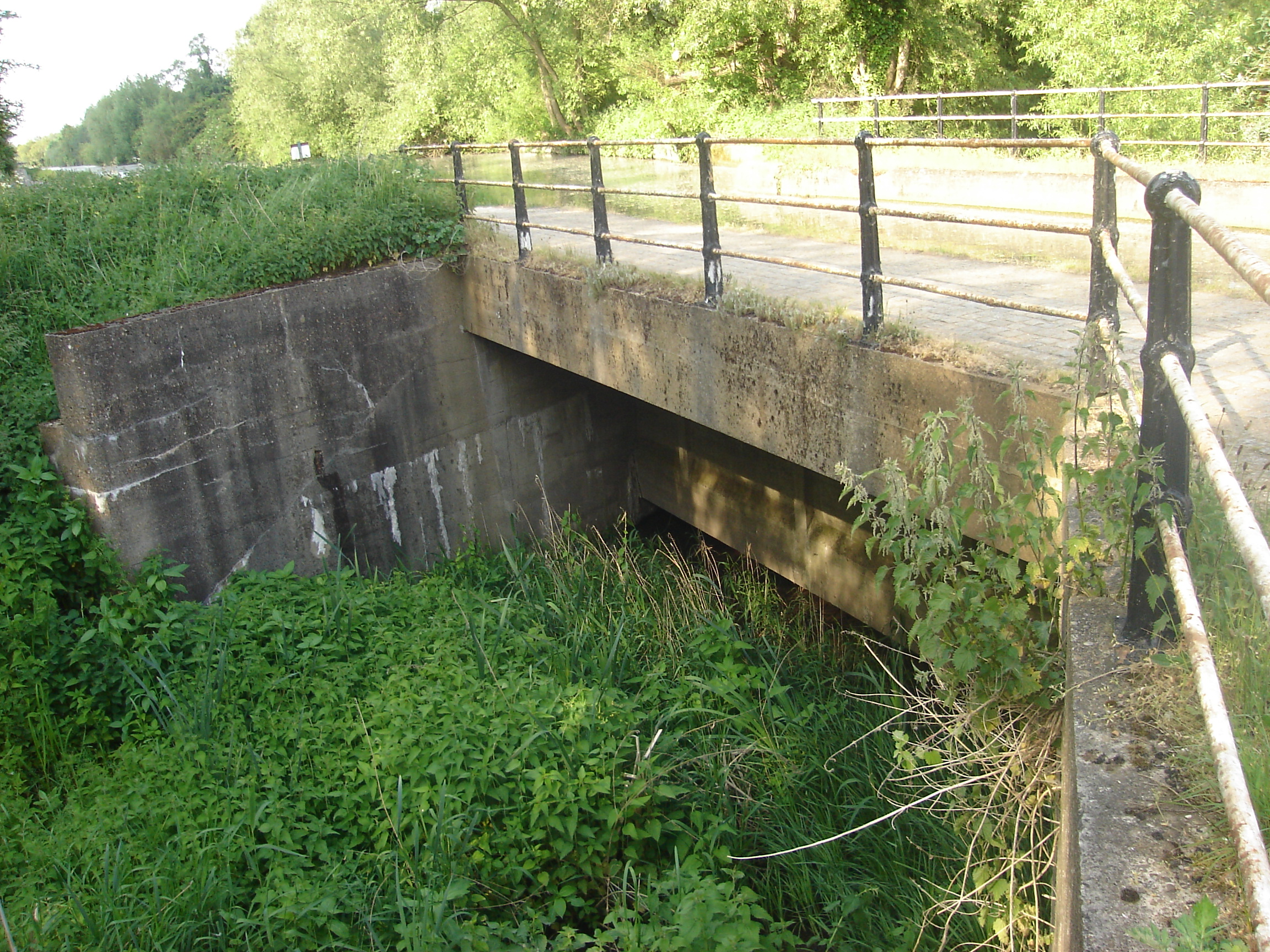
The river at Aqueduct Lock

== Course ==
The river leaves the Old River Lea below Kings Weir to flow through an aqueduct under the River Lee Navigation at Aqueduct Lock. It is joined by Turnford Brook TL3624703866 at Turnford before meandering in a southerly direction past various lakes including the North Metropolitan and Cheshunt Lake and parallel with the West Anglia Main Line railway line. The river forms a boundary with the Lee Valley youth hostel at Cheshunt before flowing under Windmill Lane close to Cheshunt railway station. It flows close to the Lea Valley railway line and then between Bowyers Water and the River Lee Navigation before passing under the A121 road close to Waltham Cross to the west and Waltham Abbey to the east. The river passes under the M25 motorway into Rammey Marsh to merge with Turkey Brook below Enfield Lock close to the A1055 road.

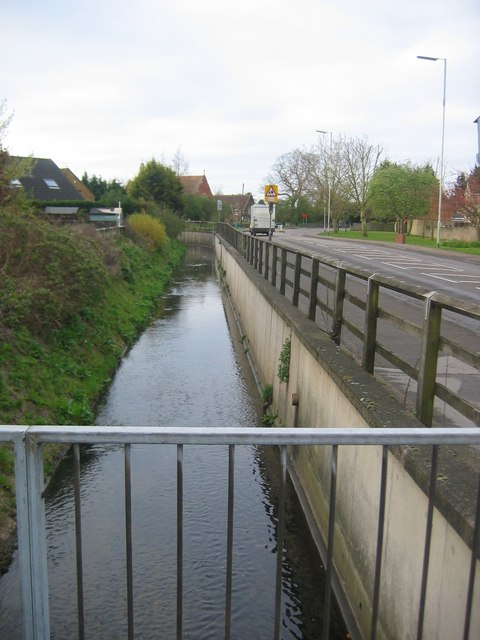
Turnford Brook at Turnford

== Ecology ==
The river flows mostly hidden in a deep channel. Shallow and prone to pollution, it is not known as a fishery. It is however a valuable spawning/nursery area for fish.
