= Wormleybury Brook =

River tributary in Hertfordshire, England

Coordinates: 51.73092°N 0.03579°W

Wormleybury Brook is a tributary of the River Lea which rises in the hills south of White Stubbs Lane in Hertfordshire, England.
