= Haileybury Turnford =

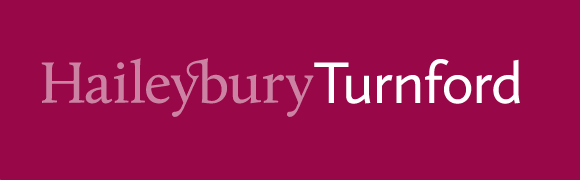
- Logo of Haileybury Turnford

Location
- Mill Lane; Cheshunt, Hertfordshire, EN8 0JU; England
- Coordinates: 51.711455°N 0.024555°W

Information
- Type: Academy
- Motto: Ambition, pride, success.
- Local authority: Hertfordshire
- Department for Education URN: 142051 Tables
- Ofsted: Reports
- Principal: Robin Newman
- Gender: Coeducational
- Age: 11 to 18
- Website: http://www.haileyburyturnford.com/

Haileybury Turnford (formerly Turnford School) is a coeducational secondary school and sixth form located in Turnford, Hertfordshire, England.

Previously a community school administered by Hertfordshire County Council, in September 2015 Turnford School converted to academy status and was renamed Haileybury Turnford. The school is now sponsored by Haileybury and Imperial Service College, a private school in Hertford. Hertfordshire County Council continue to coordinate its admissions.

== Conversion and recent developments ==
In July 2015, the school closed its gates for the last time as 'Turnford School'. It re-opened under the new name 'Haileybury Turnford' in September 2015. Haileybury College, an independent school in Hertford, became its sponsor, and a new uniform was introduced and the school colours were changed from green to magenta.

Ofsted rated Haileybury Turnford as a 'Good School' in March 2022, recognising the high quality of education now evident at the school. There are regular local trips and visits, and a growing number of trips for students overseas, including to the Battlefields in Belgium, an Art, Media & Photography trip to New York, a ski trip to Italy, and opportunities for sixth formers to visit Australia and Uganda.

Haileybury Turnford opened one new building in September 2021, and the rest of the school will be completely redeveloped in the next 2–3 years.

== Notable former students ==
- Alexandra Cristo, Author
- Scarlette Douglas, TV Presenter, Singer, Dancer and TV Property Expert
- Roxy Eloise, Author
- Tommie Kidd, Actor
- Laura Trott, Cyclist and GB's most successful female Olympian
