= Cheshunt =

Town in Hertfordshire, England

Coordinates: 51°42′08″N 0°02′05″W

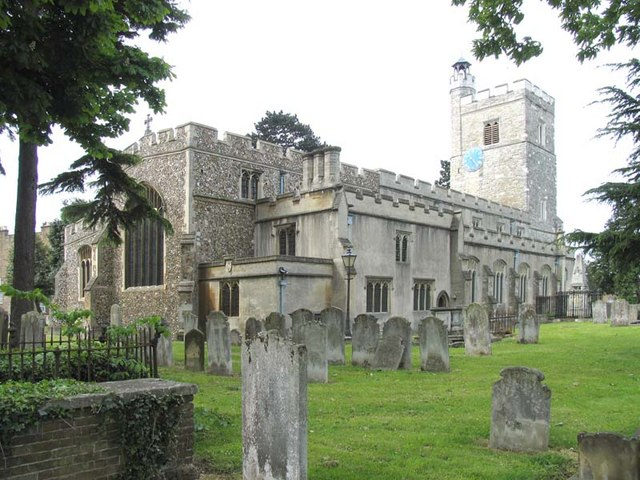
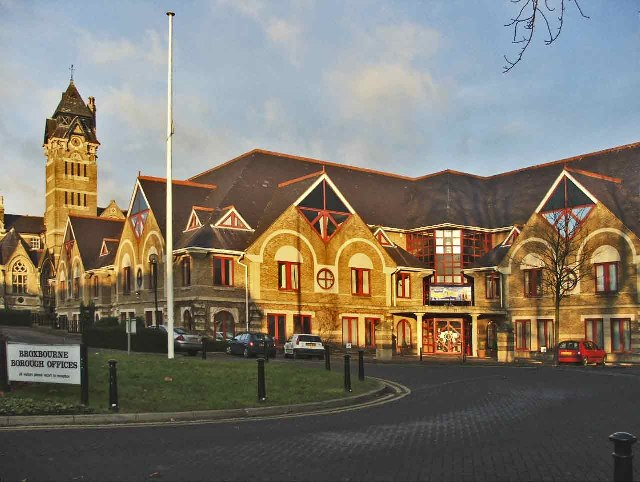
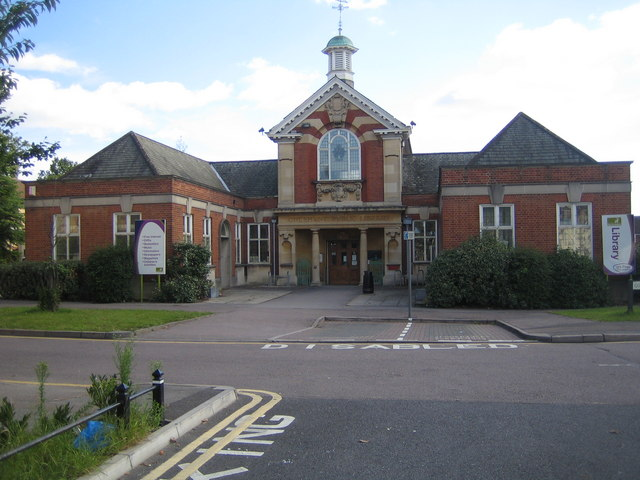
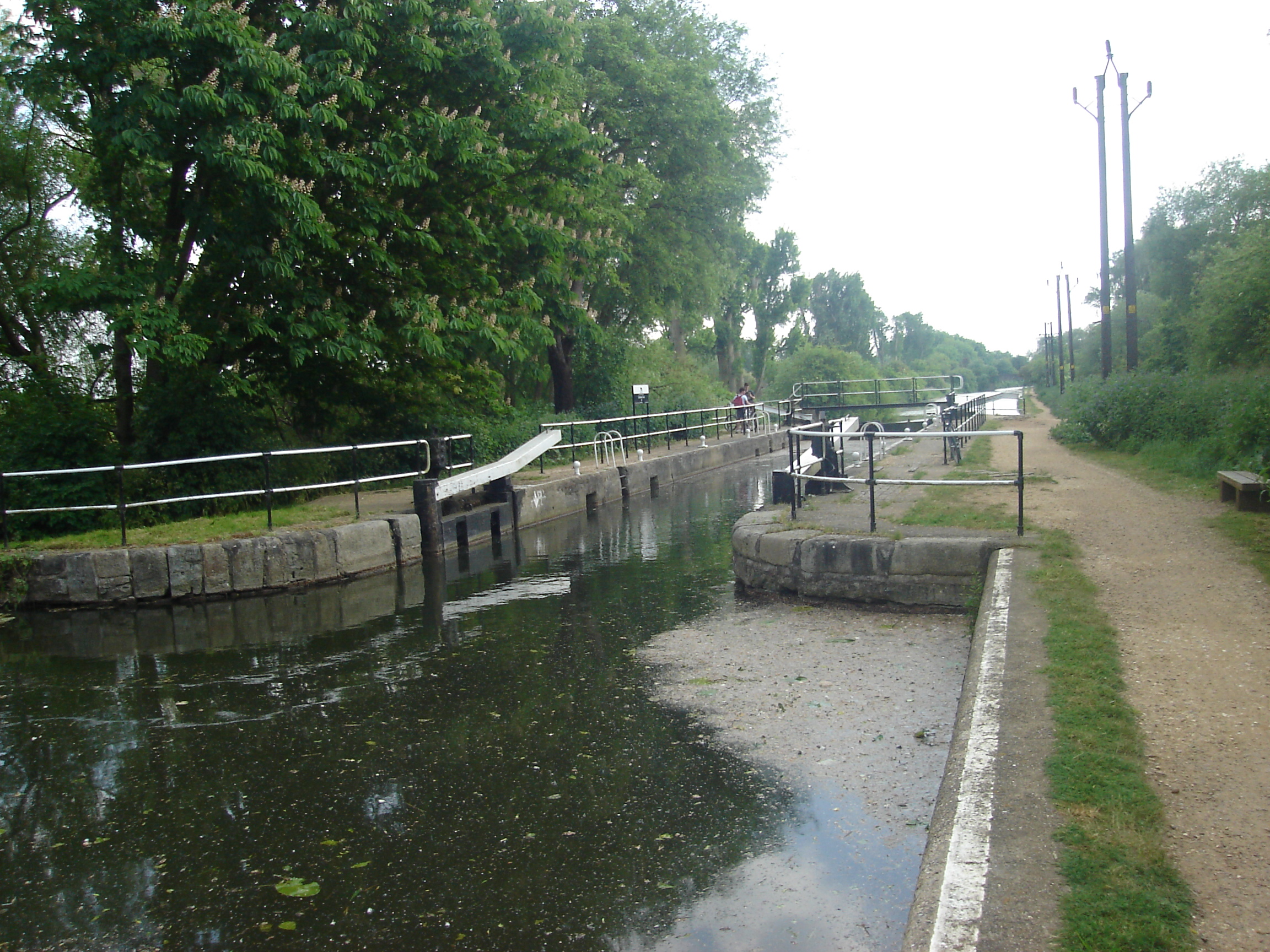
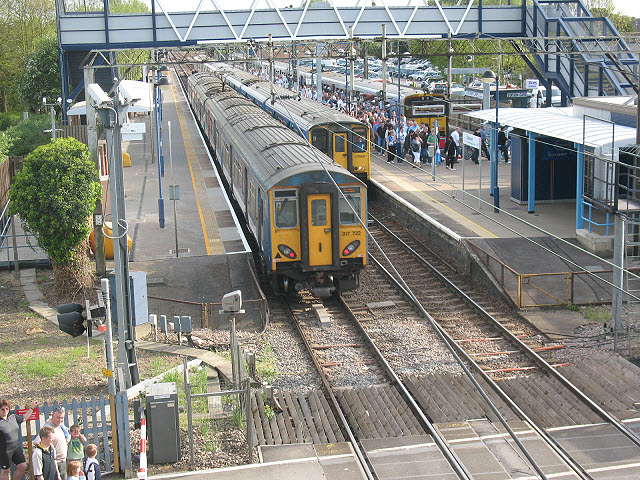
- Clockwise from top: St Mary's Church, Cheshunt Library, Cheshunt station, Cheshunt Lock, and the Broxbourne Borough Council offices

- Location within Hertfordshire
- Population: 43,680 (Built-up area, 2021)
- OS grid reference: TL358021
  - London: 12 mi (19 km)
- District: Broxbourne
- Shire county: Hertfordshire
- Region: East
- Country: England
- Sovereign state: United Kingdom
- Post town: WALTHAM CROSS
- Postcode district: EN7, EN8
- Dialling code: 01992
- Police: Hertfordshire
- Fire: Hertfordshire
- Ambulance: East of England
- UK Parliament: Broxbourne

Cheshunt (/ˈtʃɛzənt/ CHEZ-ənt) is a town in the Borough of Broxbourne, in Hertfordshire, England. It lies within the London commuter belt approximately 13 miles (21 km) north of Central London, on the River Lea and Lee Navigation, bordering the Lee Valley Park. At the 2021 census, the Cheshunt built-up area had a population of 43,680.

Cheshunt was recorded as Cestrehunt in the Domesday Book of 1086. The original centre of Cheshunt was around St Mary's Church, near the course of the Roman road of Ermine Street. The main centre subsequently shifted eastwards onto the High Street and Turners Hill, which together form a main road running roughly parallel to the River Lea. Cheshunt was an ancient parish; as well as Cheshunt itself the parish also covered Waltham Cross, Turnford, Goffs Oak, and surrounding rural areas. The parish included a number of large country houses and their estates, notably including Cheshunt Great House, Cheshunt Park, and Theobalds. The civil parish of Cheshunt was abolished in 1974 on the creation of the borough of Broxbourne.

In the 20th century, the town was known for glasshouse horticulture and rose cultivation. Cheshunt today is a commuter town with regular services via Cheshunt railway station on the West Anglia Main Line and London Overground, and is accessible by road via the A10 and M25 motorway.

== Toponymy ==
The name Cheshunt is Old English. It appears as Cestrehunt in the Domesday Book of 1086. The first element, ceaster, derives from the Latin castra, meaning "fort" or "military camp", a common component in English place names that indicates Roman origins. The second element, hunt, is thought to denote "a hunting ground" or "huntsman", suggesting that the area may have been known for its association with hunting. Alternatively, the second element may derive from funta, meaning a spring.

This etymology is consistent with Cheshunt's position on the Roman road of Ermine Street. Though no archaeological evidence of a Roman fort has been conclusively identified in Cheshunt itself, its toponymic structure and strategic location suggest a Roman presence.

== History ==
=== Prehistoric and Roman period ===
Archaeological evidence indicates human activity from prehistoric times in the area that became Cheshunt, with excavations uncovering flint tools and pottery.

Map of Roman roads in Britannia, with Ermine Street marked in red

During the Roman era, the Ermine Street was built through the area, being a major road linking Londinium (London) to Eboracum (York). By the time of the Norman Conquest of 1066, this section of Ermine Street had been replaced by a newer road to the east, running closer to the River Lea. Parts of the course of the old Ermine Street are now followed by footpaths, whilst other sections of the Roman road can only be detected as buried archaeological remains.

Although the town's name suggests there was a Roman camp here, no trace of a permanent Roman settlement has been found in the area. That said, there have been a number of finds from the Roman era, including coins and pottery finds. The Roman Urn public house on Crossbrook Street commemorates this heritage. An episode of Time Team in 2002 followed an archaeological dig which uncovered further Roman-era artefacts in Cheshunt.

=== Medieval period ===
By the end of the Anglo-Saxon era, Cheshunt was a manor. Immediately before the Norman Conquest of 1066, it was owned by someone called Edeva the Fair. The Domesday Book of 1086 records the manor as Cestrehunt in the Hertford Hundred of Hertfordshire. By then, it was owned by Alan Rufus, a Breton nobleman who had been granted extensive estates across England in the years following the Battle of Hastings. The Domesday Book recorded a total of 78 households in the manor, which also had a mill and extensive woodland.

A priest is recorded in the Domesday Book, suggesting Cheshunt was also a parish by that time. Cheshunt's parish church, dedicated to St Mary, was built between 1418 and 1448, replacing an earlier church on the site. By the late 12th century, Cheshunt also had a Benedictine convent known as Cheshunt Nunnery, which survived until the dissolution of the monasteries in the 1530s.

=== Country houses and estates ===
Cheshunt had comprised a single manor at the time of the Domesday Book. In medieval times it had a moated manor house, the site of which is now known as Half Moat Manor. It stood on the east side of Dark Lane (the former Ermine Street), and to the west of the parish church.

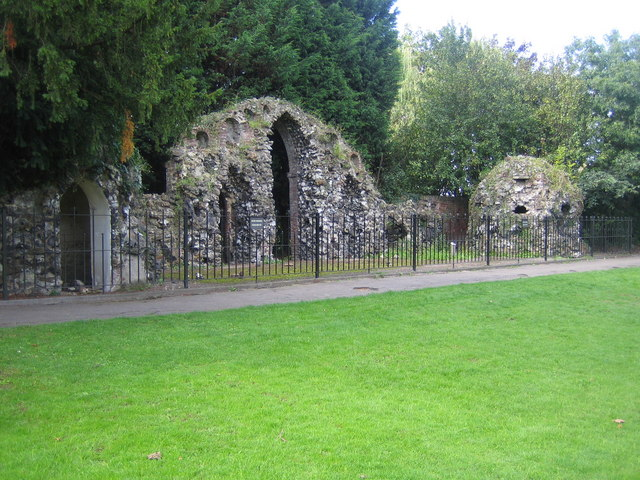
Ruins of Theobalds Palace in Cedars Park, originally built by William Cecil in the 1560s

The manor of Cheshunt gradually fragmented into smaller manors or estates. In the south of the parish, Theobalds had become a separate manor by 1441. It was acquired by William Cecil in 1564. He had the house there rebuilt shortly afterwards. The new building was known as Theobalds Palace. Cecil became Lord Burghley in 1571 and was a major political figure of the time. Elizabeth I visited Theobalds frequently. Elizabeth had also visited Cheshunt prior to her accession to the throne, staying in the household of Anthony Denny in 1548.

The Cecil family gave Theobalds Palace to James I in 1607 in exchange for Hatfield House. James found Theobalds a good location for sport and spent significant time there. He died at Theobalds in 1625. Much of the palace was demolished in 1650 following the English Civil War. The remainder of the palace was demolished in 1765, following the construction of Theobalds House on a new site within the Theobalds estate, about a mile to the west of the palace. The site of the palace was eventually donated to the local council in 1919 to become a public park called Cedars Park.

The Temple Bar gateway, which had been completed in 1672 to mark the western entrance of the City of London, was dismantled in 1878. It was subsequently re-erected in Theobalds Park in the 1880s. It was dismantled again and returned to London in 2004, where it was re-erected on a new site in Paternoster Square, adjacent to St Paul's Cathedral.

Cheshunt Great House prior to its destruction by fire in 1965

By 1474, a manor called Andrews had also been created at Cheshunt. Cheshunt Great House was built in the 15th century as its manor house, likely on the site of an earlier building as its vaults were said to date from the 13th century. In 1519, the Great House came into the possession of Cardinal Thomas Wolsey, chief adviser to Henry VIII. The Great House was destroyed in a fire in 1965.

Cheshunt Park was another estate created from part of the ancient manor of Cheshunt. There is mention of a park belonging to the manor from as early as 1339. By the 16th century, Cheshunt Park had become a separate estate. In 1795, a mansion called Brantyngeshaye was built at Cheshunt Park for its owner, Oliver Cromwell, who was great-grandson of the Oliver Cromwell who had ruled England in the 1650s following the English Civil War. The house subsequently also became known as Cheshunt Park after the park in which it stood. The house was demolished in 1970.

=== Growth of the modern town ===
In the early 19th century, the settlement of Cheshunt was still described as a village. The settlement had two main centres; the ancient core of the village along the street called Churchgate near the parish church, and a roadside settlement which had grown up along High Street and Turners Hill about 0.6 miles (1 km) to the east, to take advantage of passing trade along that main road.

Dewhurst School on Churchgate was founded in 1640 by Robert Dewhurst. Now called Dewhurst St Mary's School, it is Cheshunt's oldest school.

The Cheshunt Railway, an experimental overhead monorail, was opened in 1825. It was designed by engineer Henry Robinson Palmer, and was primarily built to carry materials from the brickworks of a Mr Gibbs near Gews Corner to a wharf on the River Lea. It also carried passengers, making it the world's first passenger monorail. The design featured an overhead track with horse-drawn carriages suspended below, with hinged rail sections to accommodate road crossings. No trace of the monorail survives.

The Northern and Eastern Railway opened its line from London as far as Broxbourne in 1840. The line passed through the parish of Cheshunt, but the only station in the parish when the line first opened was Waltham station at Waltham Cross. Cheshunt railway station subsequently opened in 1846. The railways enhanced connectivity with London. Commuter housing grew significantly, particularly from the 1930s onwards.

==== Glasshouse industry ====
Cheshunt became a major centre of commercial glasshouses for market gardening, growing vegetables such as tomatoes and cucumbers, and flowers such as roses. Growers were able to take advantage of the area's good water supply and its proximity to London. The first glasshouses in the area were built in 1806. The nursery firm Paul and Son, established in 1806, gained prominence for breeding notable varieties of rose, including the 'Cheshunt Hybrid' introduced in the 1870s.

In 1931, British Pathé featured Cheshunt's female horticultural workers in an "Eve's Film Review" segment titled Glass-House Girls. The footage shows women harvesting cucumbers in the town's commercial greenhouses, and sorting the produce into wicker baskets before loading them onto lorries for distribution.

By 1967, the Cheshunt area had a quarter of the country's glasshouses. The industry went into sharp decline after that, and most of the glasshouses were redundant by the end of the 1970s, with many subsequently being redeveloped for housing.

==== War commemoration ====
In 1923, a war memorial was erected to honour local men who died in the First World War. It was designed by architect J. W. Hanchett, and stands in the central garden of a courtyard of almshouses at the corner of Turners Hill and Victoria Close. It was later rededicated to also include those who died in the Second World War and post-1945 conflicts.

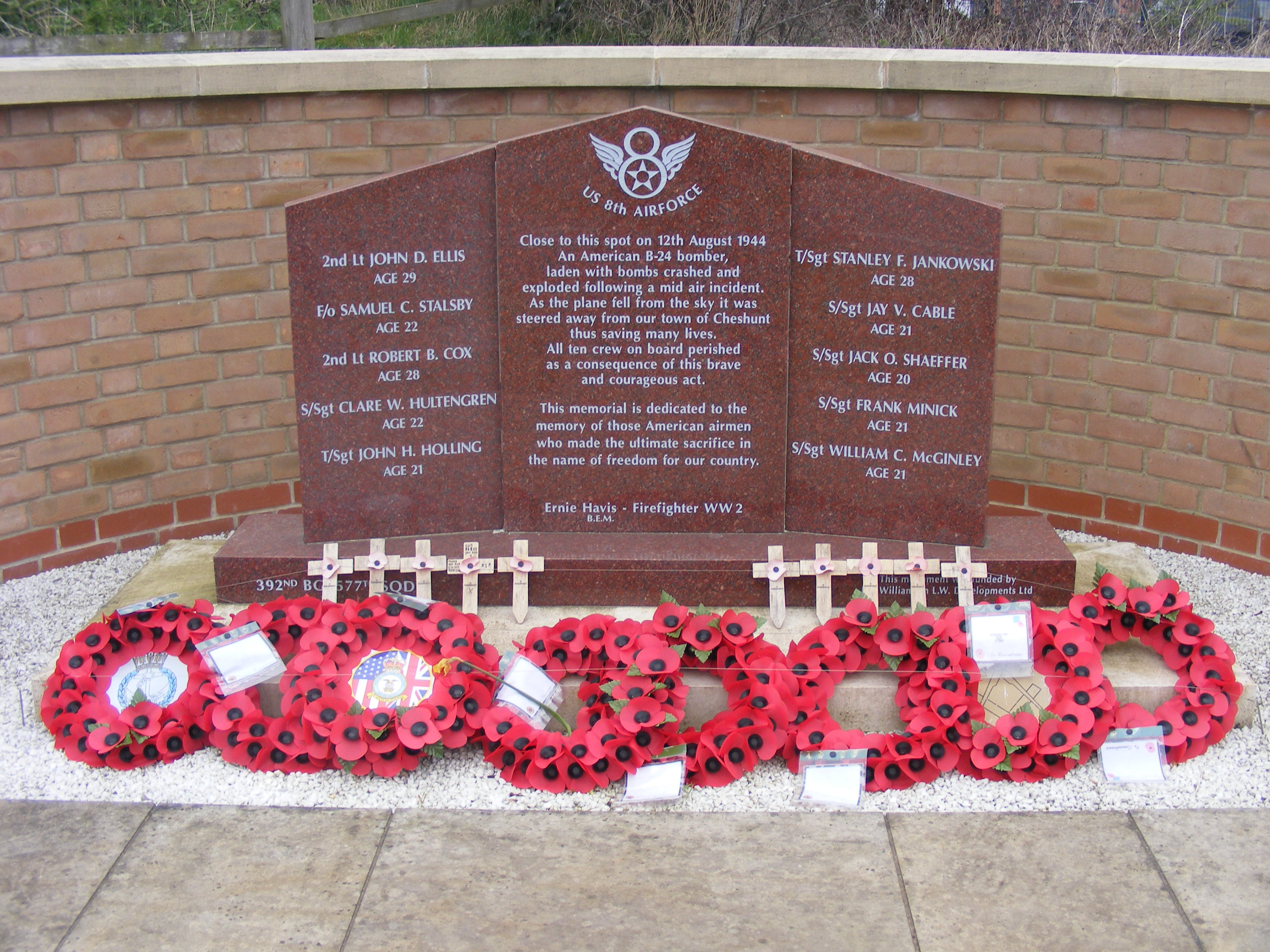
Memorial to the ten American crew who died in a plane crash in 1944

During the Second World War, on 12 August 1944, a Consolidated B-24 Liberator bomber of the United States Army Air Forces, en route to France and loaded with explosives, crashed on land at Albury Farm, killing all ten crew members aboard. Witnesses reported that the stricken plane initially appeared to have been heading for the centre of Cheshunt, but was steered by its pilot, Lieutenant John D. Ellis, to avoid landing on the town itself, avoiding civilian casualties. The incident is commemorated in the naming of a modern road as Lieutenant Ellis Way. A memorial plaque was also unveiled in 2010 near the crash site at the entrance to St Mary's School, honouring the American crew's sacrifice.

==== Economic and urban development ====
Following the Second World War, a number of council estates were developed in Cheshunt, with some being built on land bought by London borough councils in order to cater for London overspill.

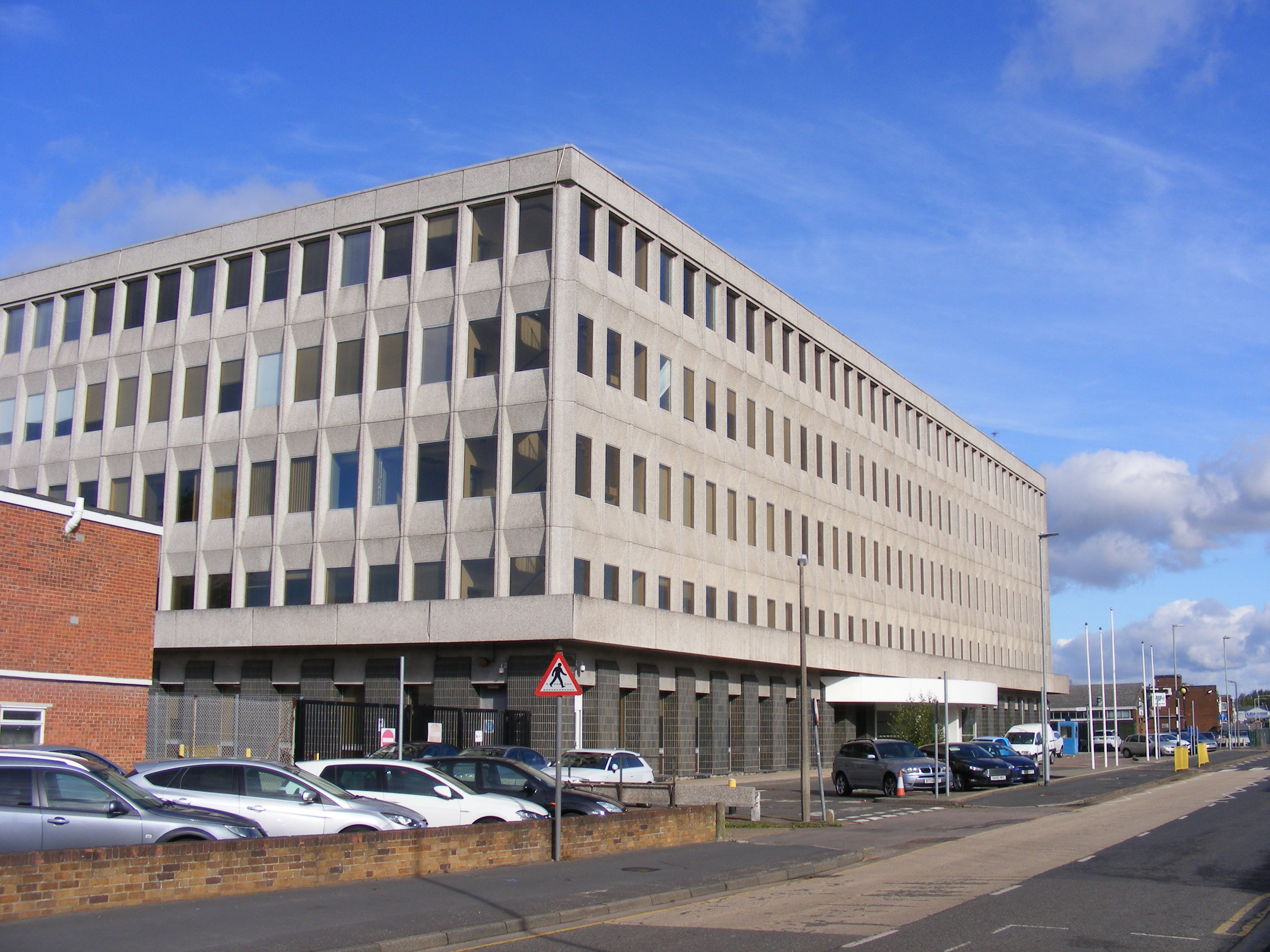
The former Tesco headquarters in Cheshunt, which served as the company's base until 2016

In 1973, Tesco established its headquarters at Delamere Road in Cheshunt. The site remained Tesco's headquarters until 2016, when the company moved its headquarters to Welwyn Garden City. The former Tesco headquarters was subsequently demolished to make way for the new "Cheshunt Lakeside" development of 1,700 homes alongside a new school and shops.

Cheshunt today functions as a commuter settlement, supported by its transport connections, including proximity to the M25 motorway and rail links. In a survey in 2019 by the This Is Money website, Cheshunt was ranked as the best commuter town for people working in London based on factors including property prices, travel time, and local amenities.

== Geography ==
=== Location and topography ===
Cheshunt is located in the Borough of Broxbourne, Hertfordshire, approximately 13 miles (21 km) north of central London. The town lies within the Lea Valley, the wide, gently-sloping valley of the River Lea, which flows south into the River Thames. The area's geological composition includes Quaternary alluvial deposits and Eocene London Clay, contributing to the fertile soils which made the area particularly suited for market gardening.

=== Hydrology and natural features ===
The River Lea and its network of waterways–including the Lee Navigation, Small River Lea, Rags Brook and Turnford Brook–form part of the 10,000-acre (4,000 ha) Lee Valley Park, a linear green corridor that includes wetlands, woodlands, and recreational areas.

Turnford Brook, a minor tributary of the River Lea, rises near Wormley and flows south-east beneath the A10 and the New River via an aqueduct at Turnford. It continues through Cheshunt Wash, a low-lying area that also receives flow from Rags Brook, before running under the West Anglia Main Line and eventually joining the Small River Lea in the River Lee Country Park.

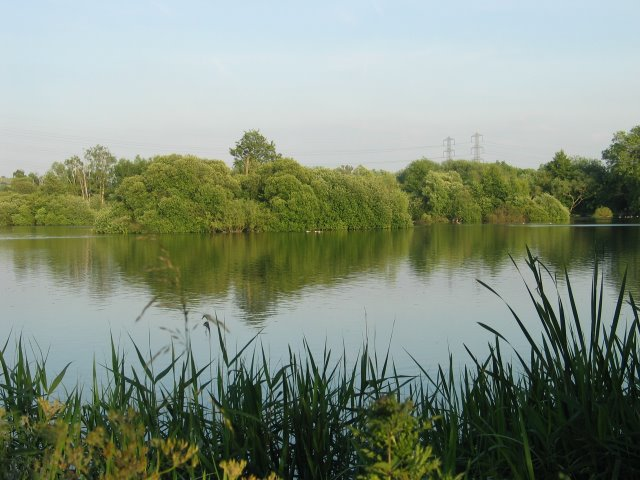
North Met Pit, a former gravel pit now part of the Turnford and Cheshunt Pits SSSI

The town also contains the Turnford and Cheshunt Pits, a designated Site of Special Scientific Interest (SSSI). These former gravel pits, now flooded, are valued for their biodiversity, supporting orchids, dragonflies, and over 200 bird species.

The New River was built in the 17th century to supply drinking water to London. It passes through the town near the modern Brookfield shopping centre, White Fields estate and Bury Green.

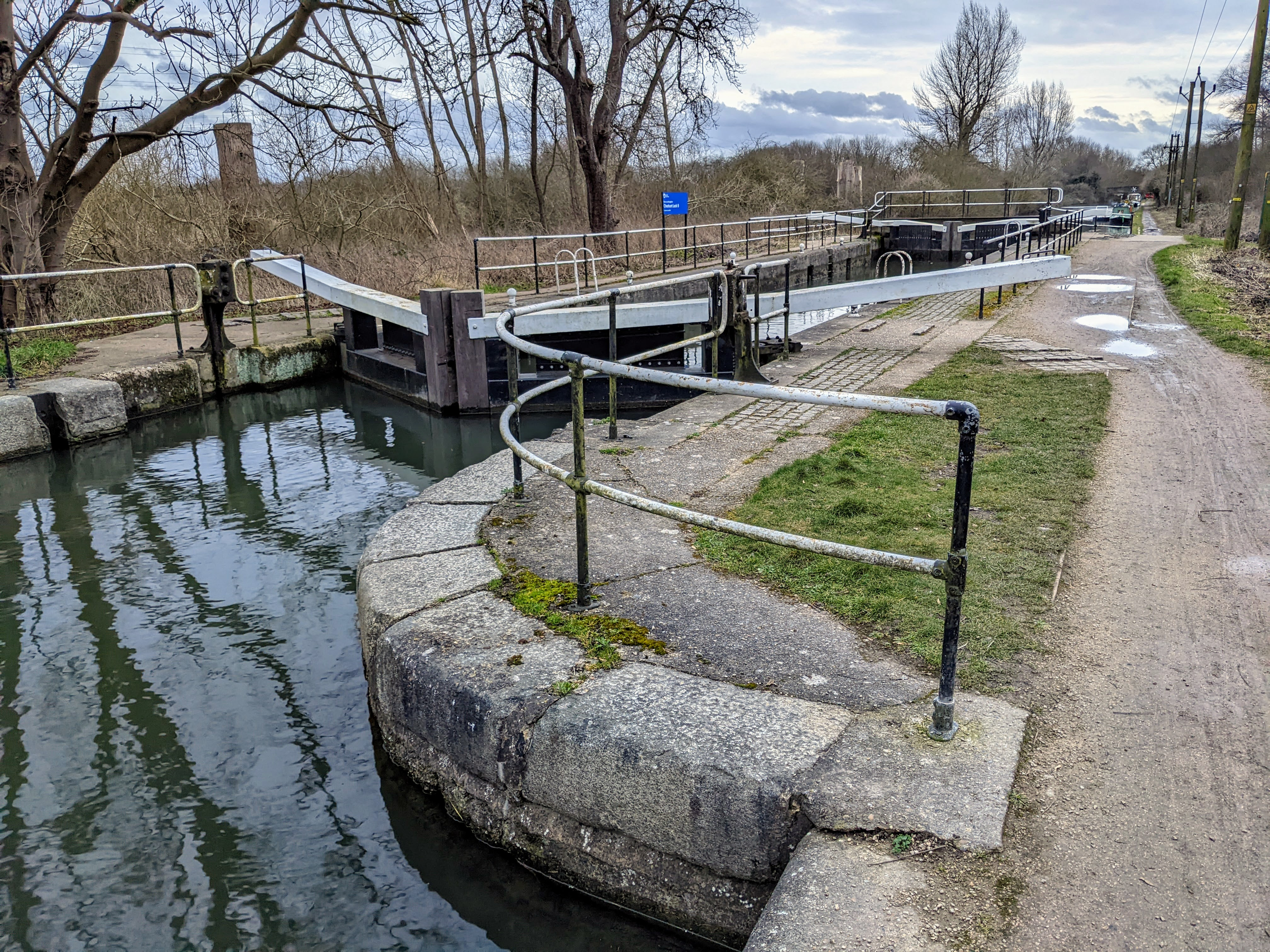
Cheshunt Lock on the Lee Navigation

At Cheshunt Lock on the Lee Navigation, boaters navigate an operational lock that reflects the town's historic involvement in river trade and transport.

=== Climate ===
Cheshunt has a temperate maritime climate, characterised by mild summers and cool winters. Average high temperatures range from 8 °C in January to 23 °C in July, with an annual precipitation of approximately 720 mm. Rainfall is evenly distributed throughout the year.

Average monthly temperatures in Cheshunt (°C)
Month	Jan	Feb	Mar	Apr	May	Jun	Jul	Aug	Sep	Oct	Nov	Dec
Average high	8	8	10	13	17	20	22	22	19	15	11	8
Average temperature	5	5	7	10	13	16	18	18	15	12	8	6
Average low	3	3	4	6	9	12	14	14	12	9	6	4

== Demographics ==
At the 2021 census, the Cheshunt built-up area as defined by the Office for National Statistics had a population of 43,680.

== Governance ==
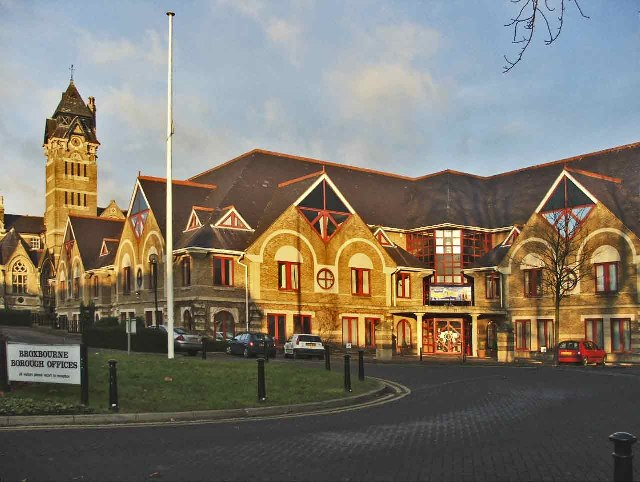
Broxbourne Borough Council's offices, Bishop's College, Churchgate, Cheshunt

There are two tiers of local government covering Cheshunt, at district (borough) and county level: Broxbourne Borough Council and Hertfordshire County Council. The borough council is based in Cheshunt, having its offices at the Bishop's College on Churchgate.

=== Administrative history ===
Cheshunt was an ancient parish in the hundred of Hertford. The parish was subdivided into three townships: Cheshunt Street, Waltham Cross, and Woodside. In 1837 the parish was included in the Edmonton Poor Law Union, a group of parishes which collectively administered their responsibilities under the poor laws.

The parish of Cheshunt was made a local board of health district in 1850, administered by an elected board, which first met in October that year. Such districts were reconstituted as urban districts under the Local Government Act 1894.

Coat of arms granted to Cheshunt Urban District Council in 1944

The urban district council was initially based at St Mary's Hall on College Road. It later moved to a converted house called the Manor House on Turners Hill. Cheshunt Public Library was built in the Manor House grounds in 1907. In 1944, the urban district council was granted its own coat of arms.

In 1965, the urban district council entered Cheshunt into a twin town partnership with Stains in the Île-de-France region of northern France, just north of Paris. The partnership was established to foster cultural understanding and community links between the two towns. A new road off Cadmore Lane was named Stains Close by the mayor of Stains as part of the ceremony to mark the twinning.

Cheshunt Urban District was abolished in 1974 under the Local Government Act 1972. The area became part of the new Borough of Broxbourne. No successor parish was created for the former urban district, and so it became unparished. Shortly before its abolition, the old urban district council bought the former Bishop's College on Churchgate, and that complex was extended to become the headquarters of the new Broxbourne Borough Council.

== Economy ==
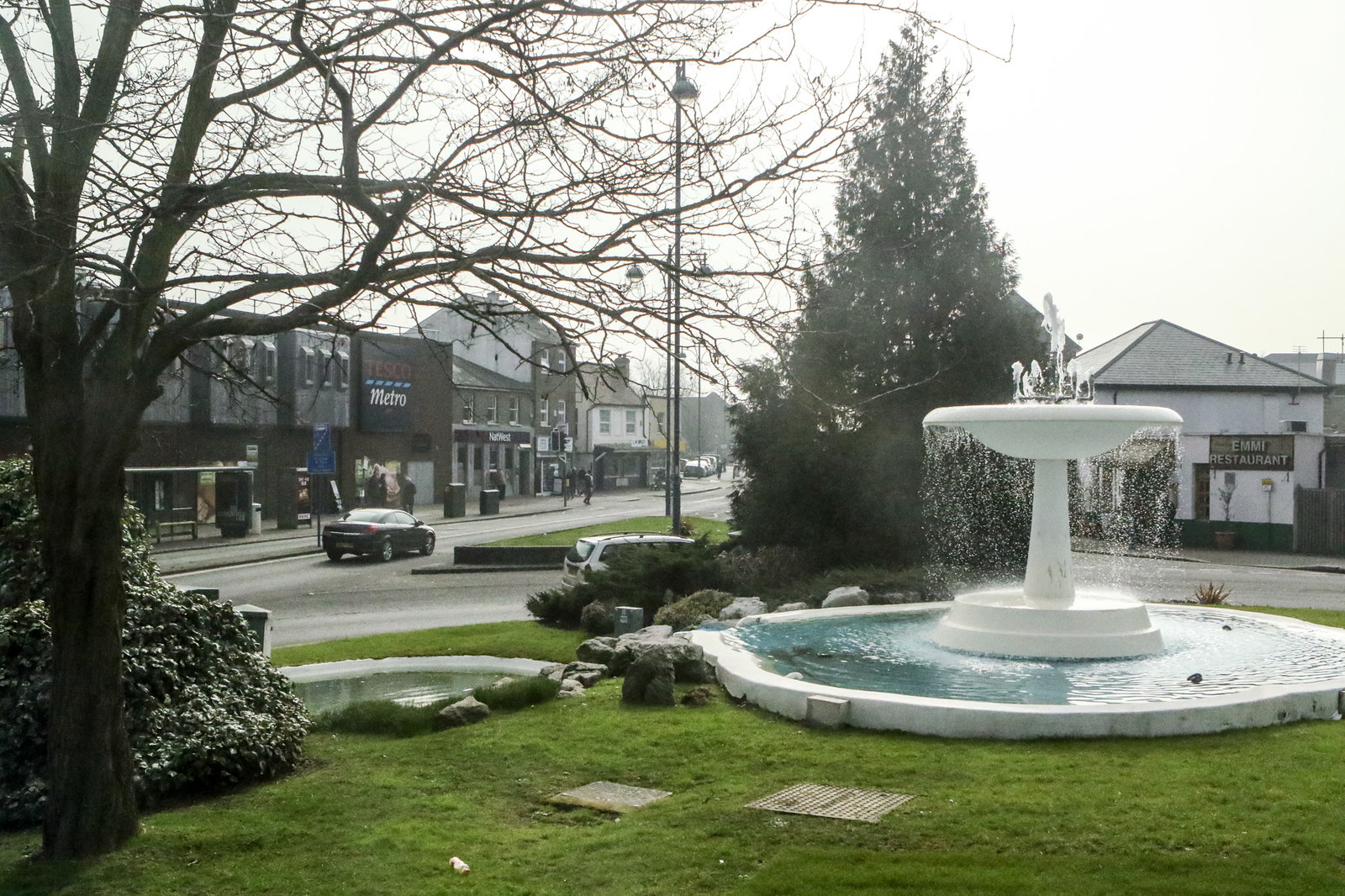
Fountain at the Old Pond roundabout in the centre of Cheshunt

Cheshunt's historic retail core, around the Old Pond junction where Turners Hill and College Road meet, is classed as a district centre by Broxbourne Borough Council. It is more modest in scale than the borough's two designated town centres at Waltham Cross and Hoddesdon.

Cheshunt also includes the large Brookfield retail park, on the north side of the town adjoining the A10. In 2021, retail was the largest employment sector for jobs based in Broxbourne borough, accounting for 23.5% of jobs. This was well above the Hertfordshire average for the sector, which was 14.4%. Planning permission was granted in 2025 for the "Brookfield Riverside" development, expanding the retail park into a new town centre, coupled with a development of over 1,250 homes at "Brookfield Garden Village" to the west of the A10.

The Theobalds Business Park near the junction of the A10 and Lieutenant Ellis Way is a modern development comprising offices, warehouses, and an enterprise centre designed to support small and medium-sized enterprises. The Theobalds Business Park also includes Google's first UK data centre, which opened in 2025.

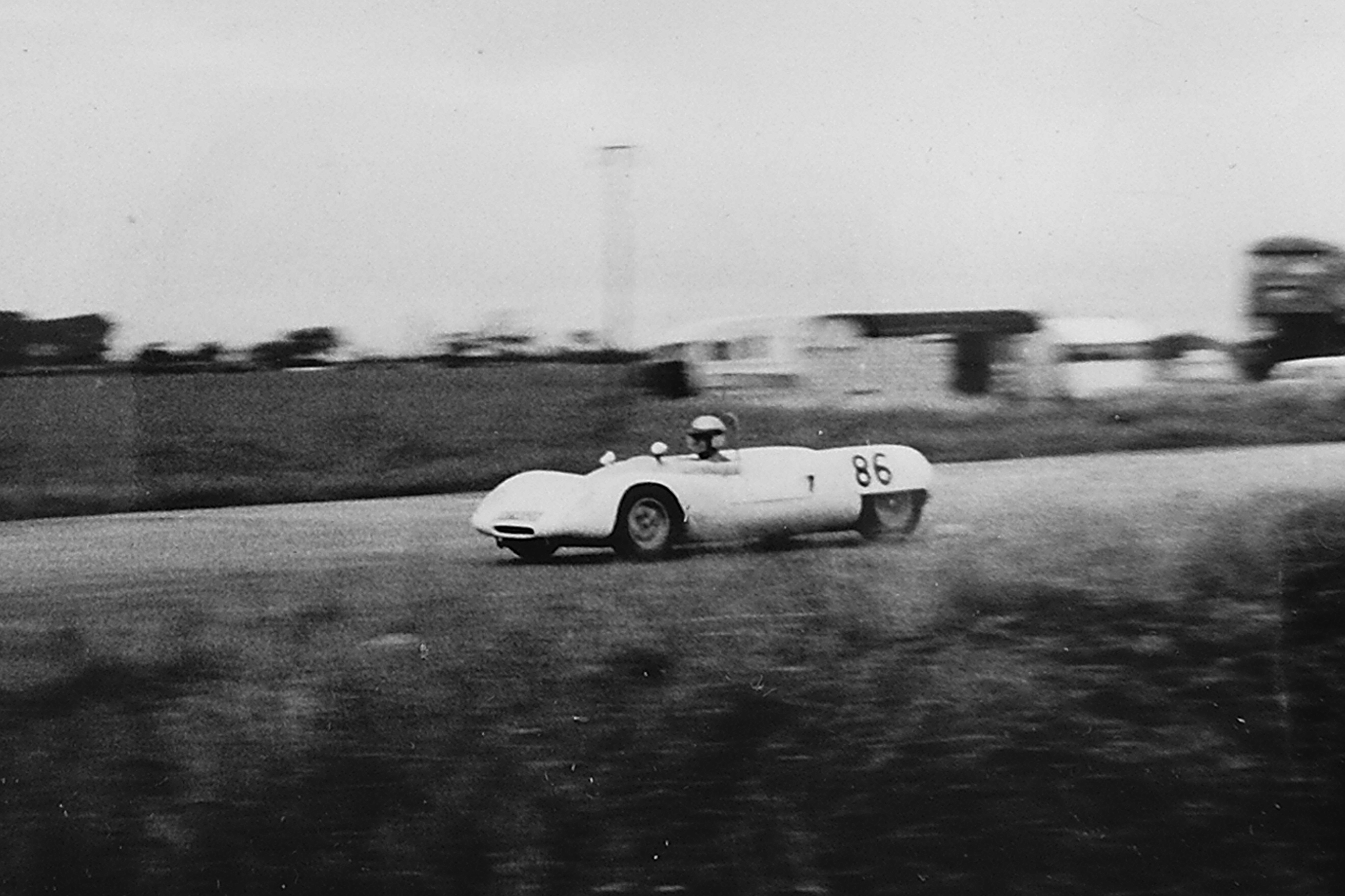
A Lotus 23B, manufactured at the Cheshunt facility between 1963 and 1966

In 1959, Colin Chapman relocated Lotus Cars and Team Lotus from Hornsey to a purpose-built facility on Delamare Road, Cheshunt. During their tenure in Cheshunt, Lotus won two Formula One Constructors' Championships (in 1963 and 1965). The company only stayed in Cheshunt for six years, before moving to Hethel, Norfolk, in 1966.

== Education ==
Cheshunt is served by thirteen primary schools and four secondary schools. The secondary schools are:

- Goffs Academy, Goffs Lane.
- Goffs-Churchgate Academy, College Road.
- Haileybury Turnford, Mill Lane.
- St Mary's Church of England High School, Lieutenant Ellis Way.

== Transport ==
=== Rail ===
Cheshunt railway station is served by both Greater Anglia and London Overground services. The station lies on the West Anglia Main Line and the Lea Valley lines, and has regular services to London Liverpool Street via Tottenham Hale and Seven Sisters, as well as northbound services to Hertford East, Bishop's Stortford, and Cambridge. The station is located in London fare zone 8, facilitating convenient travel within the Greater London area.

In 2024, the London Overground line serving Cheshunt was officially renamed the Weaver line as part of a network-wide rebranding initiative.

=== Road ===
The A10, also known locally as the Great Cambridge Road, connects the town to Junction 25 of the M25 motorway, Central London, Hertford, and Cambridge. The A10 serves as a north-south corridor through Hertfordshire.

=== Bus ===
Cheshunt is served by a variety of commercial and Hertfordshire County Council-supported bus services. Routes connect the town to Waltham Cross, Hoddesdon, Broxbourne, Hertford, Harlow, Potters Bar, and Waltham Abbey. Operators include Arriva Shires & Essex, Centrebus, Metroline, and Sullivan Buses.

=== Cycling ===
National Cycle Route 1 passes through Cheshunt, forming part of a larger network from Dover to the Shetland Islands. The Lee Valley Country Park provides scenic and practical cycling and walking routes along the River Lea, linking Cheshunt with Ware, Hoddesdon, Waltham Abbey, Tottenham, and Stratford.

As part of the Connect2 project funded by the Big Lottery Fund, the Paul Cully Bridge was constructed in 2010 to provide a safe cycle and pedestrian route over the A10. This bridge links Theobalds Lane with Lieutenant Ellis Way and expands the cycling infrastructure in the area.

== Sport ==
=== Football ===
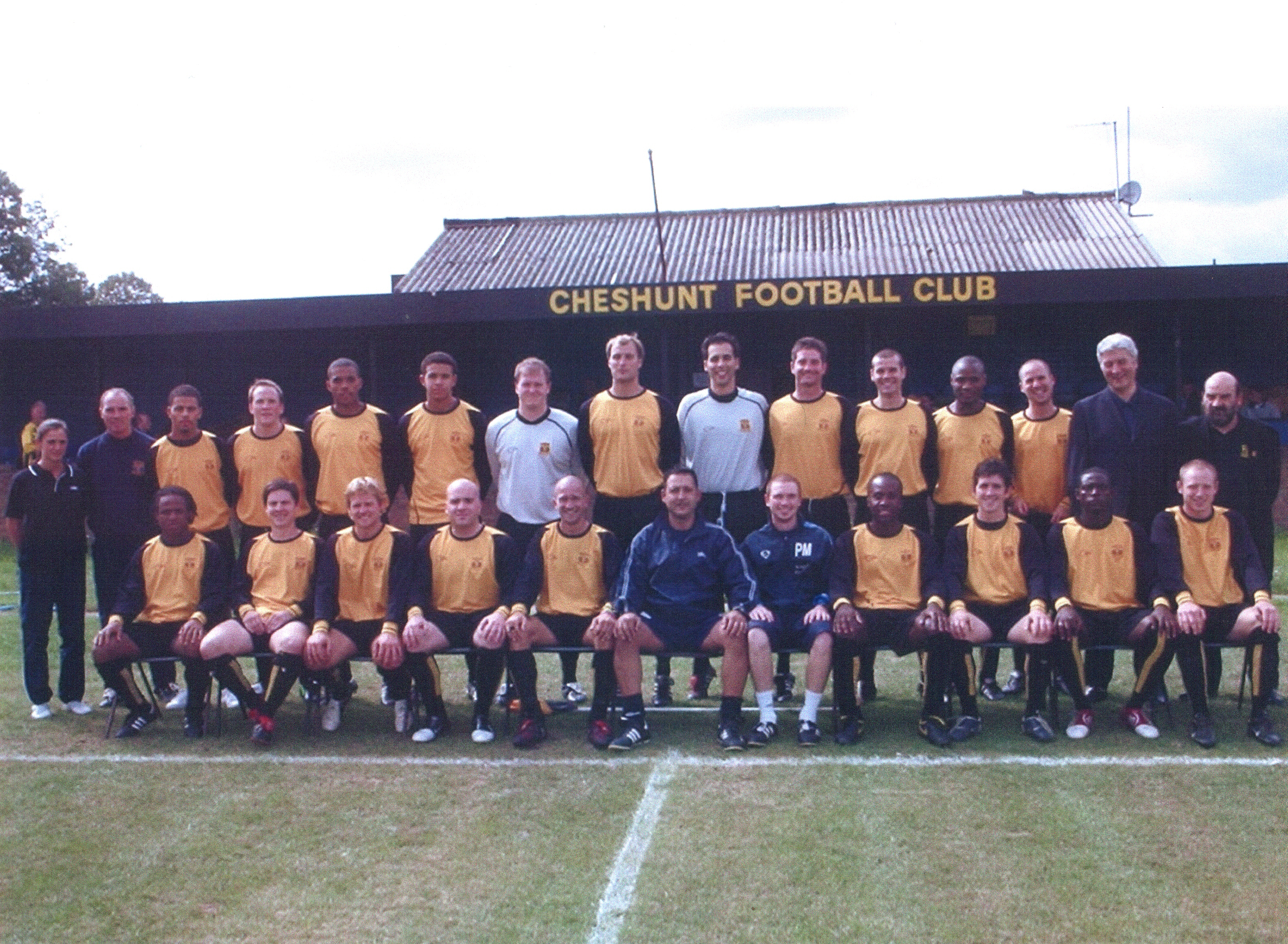
Cheshunt F.C. squad during the 2005–06 season

Cheshunt is home to Cheshunt F.C., a semi-professional football club founded in 1946. The team competes in the Isthmian League Premier Division and plays at Theobalds Lane Stadium, which has a capacity of approximately 3,500 spectators. The former professional footballer Iain Dowie played for the club during the 1980s.

F.C. Romania, established in 2006 by Romanian immigrants, also shares Theobalds Lane Stadium. The club competes in the Spartan South Midlands League Premier Division and has been part of the Cheshunt football scene since 2012.

Historically, Tottenham Hotspur F.C. used a training ground in Cheshunt from 1952 until 1996. The 11-acre site was initially purchased from Cheshunt F.C. and served as the club's primary training facility before relocating to Chigwell.

=== Rugby Union ===
Cheshunt Rugby Football Club operates from Rosedale Sports Club on Andrew Lane. The club fields multiple teams, including men's, women's, and youth squads. The men's first team competes in Counties 1 Herts/Middlesex, while the women's team participates in National Challenge 2 South East (North East).

=== Cricket ===
Cheshunt Rosedale Cricket Club was formed in 2018 through the merger of Cheshunt Cricket Club and Waltham Cross Rosedale CC. The club has facilities at Rosedale Sports Club.

=== Golf ===
Cheshunt Park Golf Centre features an 18-hole, par-71 parkland course designed by Donald Hawtree in 1971. Spanning 6,635 yards, the course includes a 9-bay driving range, putting green, and chipping area. The facility is open to both members and visitors and has a clubhouse with a bar and restaurant.

=== Water sports ===
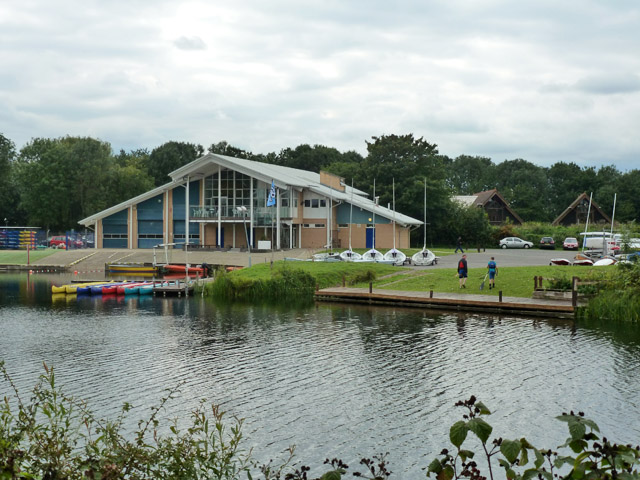
Herts Young Mariners Base

The Herts Young Mariners Base (HYMB) is an outdoor activity centre located off Windmill Lane in Cheshunt, within the Lee Valley Park. The site offers a range of water-based and adventure activities, including kayaking, canoeing, paddleboarding, open water swimming, sailing, and raft building. In addition to aquatic training, the base also provides land-based programmes such as climbing, archery, and orienteering.

The base is operated by Hertfordshire County Council and is used by local schools, scouts, youth organisations, and adult groups for educational and team-building programmes. The facility includes a lakeside wharf, equipment stores, changing rooms, and classrooms, and occupies the site of a former open-air swimming pool.

=== Leisure facilities ===
The Laura Trott Leisure Centre, named after the Olympic gold medallist, has a gym, swimming pool, exercise classes, sauna, and steam rooms. The centre also provides facilities for racket sports and hosts a number of community events.

Cheshunt Community Sports Park serves as a hub for local sports and recreation. The facility includes a gym, personal training services, sports therapy, football pitches, indoor and outdoor bowls courts, squash courts, and function rooms.

== Notable people ==
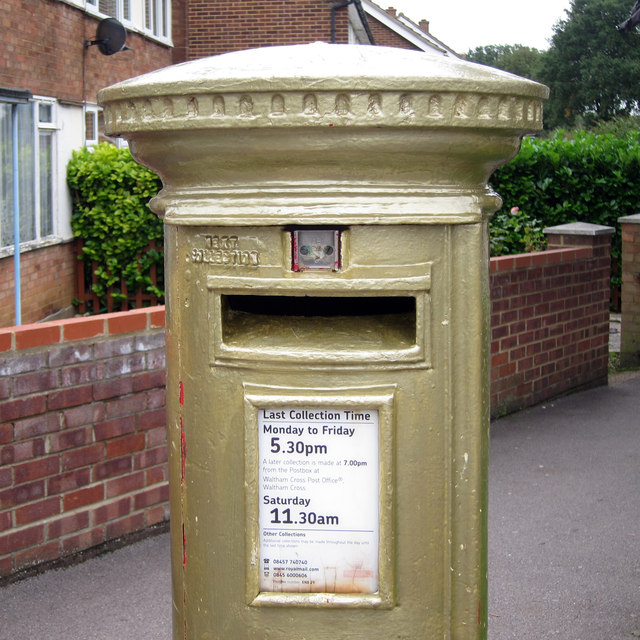
Laura Trott's gold post box on Cadmore Lane, Cheshunt, painted in honour of her 2012 Olympic gold medal.

- Victoria Beckham – Singer and fashion designer; attended St Mary's High School in Cheshunt during the 1980s.
- David Bentley – Footballer with Arsenal and Tottenham Hotspur; grew up in Cheshunt during the 1990s.
- Michael Birch – Tech entrepreneur and co-founder of Bebo.
- Eric Christiansen (1937–2016) – Historian and fellow emeritus of New College, Oxford. Born in Cheshunt.
- Phillip Cottrell – BBC journalist who grew up in Cheshunt and attended Cheshunt School.
- Richard Cromwell – Lived at Cheshunt from the 1690s until his death in 1712.
- John Dalton – Bass guitarist for The Kinks; attended Cheshunt Secondary Modern School.
- Michael Dobbs – Writer and politician; known for the "House of Cards" series.
- Allison Fisher (b.1968) – Snooker and billiards champion
- King James I – Died at Theobalds Palace in Cheshunt in 1625.
- Laura Kenny (formerly Trott) – Six-time Olympic medal-winning cyclist (2012–2020); grew up in Cheshunt.
- Greg Lincoln – Former professional footballer and current coach; born in Cheshunt in 1980.
- Ralph Creed Meredith – Chaplain to George VI and Elizabeth II; Vicar of Cheshunt 1932–1940.
- Linda Lusardi – Former glamour model and actress; longtime Cheshunt resident.
- Ryan Mason – Footballer and interim Tottenham Hotspur manager; attended Cheshunt School.
- Declan McKenna – Indie rock musician who rose to fame in the 2010s.
- Rebecca Morelle – BBC Science Editor; attended Goffs School in Cheshunt.
- Andy Parker – Drummer and founding member of the rock band UFO; born in Cheshunt in 1952.
- Cliff Richard – Singer, musician, and actor; lived in Cheshunt in the 1940s/50s.
- Billy Joe Saunders – Professional boxer, active from the 2010s.
- Emma Trott – Retired professional cyclist; born in Cheshunt in 1989.
- Cardinal Thomas Wolsey – Granted land in Cheshunt by King Henry VIII; the remains of his manor house, Cheshunt Great House, are located at Goffs Lane.

== See also ==
- Burnt Farm Cottage – a listed building in Cheshunt
