= History of Loughton =

Loughton is a town in the county of Essex in England. The first settlement can be traced back to 2,500 years ago, but the earliest records of the modern-day site of Loughton are from the Anglo-Saxon era of English history, when it was known as Lukintone. After the Norman Conquest it became part of the estate of Waltham Abbey and is mentioned in the Domesday Book as Lochintuna. It was during the 17th century, however, when Loughton began to grow significantly as a coaching stop on the newly created main route to Cambridge and East Anglia. With good transport links and proximity to both London and also Epping Forest and the countryside, it became a popular location for aristocratic and wealthy Londoners to have a home.

Most of the great houses from the 17th and 18th centuries have disappeared, and much of the modern-day housing in Loughton was built in the Victorian and Edwardian eras, with significant expansion of the town in the 1930s. A major factor in the town's continuing popularity was the advent of the railways in the 1850s and a direct line to central London, so that city-dwellers had easy access for day trips to Epping Forest (the line remains to this day as part of the Central line on the London Underground system). At the time, the Great Eastern Railway Company would not offer workmen's fares to and from Loughton, so development was of a middle-class character. Loughton was a fashionable place for artistic and scientific residents in Victorian and Edwardian times, and a number of prominent residents were also socialists, nonconformists, and social reformers. The north-eastern suburb of Debden is a post-war development intended to ease the chronic housing shortage in London in the 1940s. A large estate of prefabs was built along Oakwood Hill Road with occupation commencing in the summer of 1948.

Loughton today retains much of its semi-suburban character which has meant the town remains predominantly well-off and middle-class. It was given new national prominence when it was featured in the 2002 TV documentary show Essex Wives.

== Prehistory ==
Loughton has a very long history of settlement. Standing on a strategic spur of high ground in Epping Forest is Loughton Camp, an Iron Age fort built about 500 BC. Loughton Camp is roughly oval, defended by a single earth rampart enclosing about 12 acres (49,000 m^{2}). At one time, the Camp must have commanded an extensive view down the Roding valley, but by 1872 it was covered by dense undergrowth and entirely forgotten. In that year it was re-discovered by a Mr B.H. Cowper, and excavations ten years later found Iron Age pottery within the ramparts. Camps like this were probably places of refuge and citadels rather than places to live.

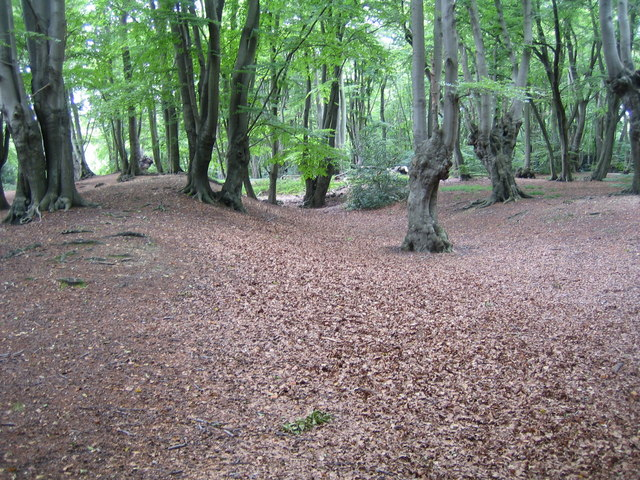
The rampart of Loughton Camp

Loughton Camp lies close to Ambresbury Banks, another Iron Age fortification (which is in Epping parish). Though the two forts were once thought to be sequential - Loughton Camp followed by Ambresbury - the current view is that they face each other across a watershed which was an ancient boundary line, later re-used as the boundary between Ongar and Waltham Hundreds. It is now believed that these two forts were in separate - and presumably sometimes hostile - territories, roughly equivalent to the medieval Hundreds of Ongar (Loughton Camp) and Ambresbury (Waltham). The forts may therefore have acted as very visible strategic positions, huge frontier markers, which defined the boundary between two territories.

== Roman era ==
There was significant Roman settlement along the Roding valley, with a minor road from London to the Roman small town at Dunmow following the course of the river. There was a settlement on the Chigwell side of the river at Little London; excavations indicate that this may have been a relay station (mutatio) where official travellers on state business could change horses and rest for the night. Little London may have been the settlement of Durolitum mentioned in the Antonine Itinerary; the name means 'the fort on the ford', which fits the geography, although the archaeological evidence has not revealed any military buildings. There was also a substantial Roman building on the Loughton side of the Roding, probably a large farmhouse.

== Anglo-Saxon era ==
In the 5th century, there was some continuation of Roman-style rule for a time, but Anglo-Saxon invaders quickly carved out new territories. One of these was the Kingdom of Essex. In the Loughton area, it is likely that rural life carried on much as it had always done, although the forest may have expanded as the population declined through war and plague. It was in this Saxon period that modern Loughton first began; known as Lukintune, the place-name is Anglo-Saxon, and means ‘the farm of Luhha'. Settlement was widely scattered; Lukintune was in the area of the later Loughton Hall, and two other hamlets were around Alderton Hall (Aelwartone - ‘the farm of Aethelwaru’), and Debden House (Tippedene - ‘the valley of Tippa’)

In 1062 Harold Godwinson (later King Harold II), re-founded Waltham Abbey and Edward the Confessor granted various estates to the Abbey, which included Tippedene (Debden) and Alwartune (Alderton Hall, in Loughton). Edward the Confessor's charter of 1062 is the first written evidence of the settlement (Lukinton). The bounds of these estates are given in the charter, but have never been analysed to assess their actual geographical extent. Tippedene means 'the valley of Tippa', but by the 13th century, the original meaning had been forgotten and the estate was by then known as Dupedene, 'deep valley'.

The boundaries of the Tippedene estate survive in an Anglo-Saxon charter. One landscape feature mentioned in the charter is saeteres burh - robbers' camp - and this may have been the Anglo-Saxon name for Loughton Camp.

== Norman era ==
Following the Norman invasion, the Domesday Book, issued in 1087, gives two snapshots of life in the area, first as it was in 1066 under Edward the Confessor, and again in 1086 under William the Conqueror (here it is written as Lochintuna). Domesday assessed the taxability of every estate in the land, so is an extremely useful guide to the taxable population and their taxable resources. Loughton was fragmented into eight separate estates. Five were held by Waltham Abbey itself, including one they had annexed from a free man. Other landowners were Robert Gernon, Peter of Valognes (who had displaced a free Anglo-Saxon named Wulfric), and the king himself. There were a total of 88 heads of households across both Chigwell and Loughton. The land must have been well-wooded as it was said to be capable of supporting 1,870 pigs, a notional measure of the size of forest but a very large number all the same. 76 acres (310,000 m^{2}) of meadows on the 10 estates of Chigwell and Loughton may well have consisted mainly of land beside the Roding, which was fertile but liable to seasonal flooding. Livestock comprised 28 cattle, 48 sheep, and 48 pigs, as well as 15 goats. There had been a watermill at Chigwell in 1066, but this had been abandoned by 1086.

== Medieval era ==
Loughton's growth since Domesday has largely been at the expense of the forest. Expansion towards the Roding was not possible over the marshy meadows, but there were gradual encroachments into the forest to the north and west of the village; it should be remembered that until recently, while the forest trees were themselves a valuable resource, the open spaces and scrub which are a natural part of any forest were simply regarded as 'waste', which ought to be taken into cultivation. Loughton landlords and villagers both saw fit to enclose and build upon forest 'waste', but the trickle of forest destruction threatened to turn into a flood in the 19th century, once royalty had lost interest in protecting the woodland as a hunting reserve, and more particularly after the railway arrived in Loughton in 1856. As the forest disappeared, some Loughton villagers defied landowners to practice their ancient right to lop wood, and the intelligentsia began to express alarm at the loss of such a significant natural resource. A series of court cases, one brought by the Loughton labourer, Thomas Willingale who has a major road, an artery from The Broadway shops down into the centre of the Debden Estate,named after him. was needed before Epping Forest was finally saved in 1878 for the enjoyment of everyone.

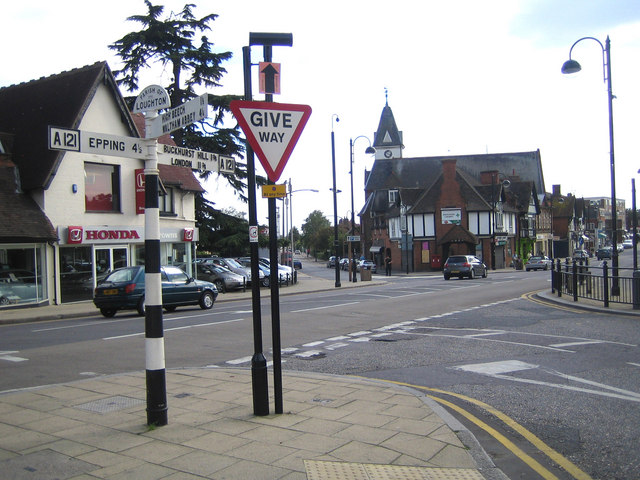
Loughton High Road

. Thomas Willingale has a major road, an artery from The Broadway shops down into the centre of the Debden Estate, named after him.

Loughton's High Road in the Middle Ages ran to Woodford to the south, but to the north, surrounded by Forest, it petered out, with footpaths running down to the Roding from Buckhurst Hill and to Chigwell. However, between 1611 and 1622, the High Road was extended via what is now Church Hill and Goldings Hill to Epping, and this quickly became the main coaching route from London to East Anglia. However, it remained a difficult route for horse-drawn traffic, because of steep hills, so in 1830-34 the Epping New Road was constructed. As early as 1404 the High Road was mentioned in a court action, when one John Lucteborough was prosecuted for throwing the rubbish from his ditch outside Richard Algor's gate on the King's highway. Richard Algor's house survived in part, concealed by much overbuilding, until 1963 near the junction of Algers Road and High Road. Many of Loughton's other roads are of ancient origin, such as Rectory Lane, Traps Hill, and Smarts Lane.

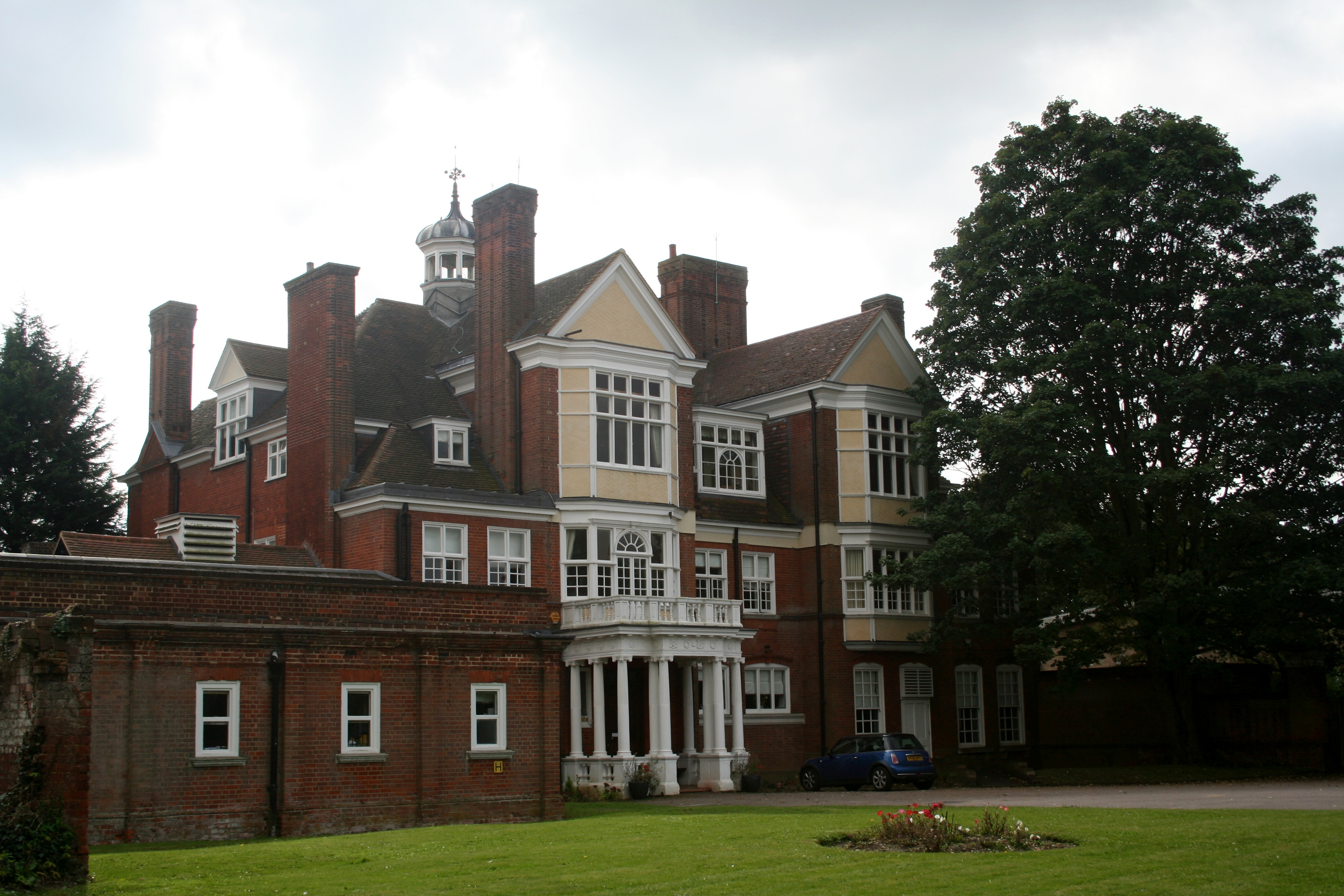
Loughton Hall

Loughton Hall has had a fascinating history. Mary Tudor was its owner two months before she became queen in 1553. In 1578 it passed to the Wroth family, who were prominent in public and court life; they held it until 1738. Lady Mary Wroth (1586-c1652) of Loughton Hall was a member of a glittering Jacobean literary circle and her book Urania was the first full-length novel to be written by an English woman. The 16th-century house, visited by James I, Anne of Denmark, Ben Jonson and Sir Robert Sidney, the younger brother of Sir Philip Sidney and the father of Mary. Sir Philip died some months before Mary Wroth was born. He therefore never visited Loughton Hall. The original Loughton Hall burnt down in a fire in 1836, to be replaced by the present building, which the Reverend J. W. Maitland had built in 1878. The Maitland family held the manor for much of the 19th century, and dominated parish life. As major landowners, they were bound up with the controversy over the future of the Forest. In 1944 the house and estate were sold to the London County Council. A London County Council estate was built on the land, which was called the Debden estate rather than the Loughton Hall estate, and the house was given over to community use. From 1948 until the early 1950s Loughton Hall was an "Infants School" catering for 5 to 8 year olds.

Agriculture and forestry were the most important local trades until well into the 20th century. There were other industries however, on a small scale. As the place-names Tile-Kiln Farm and Potters Close testify, there were brick, tile and pottery manufacturing sites in the area from the 15th century onwards. In Loughton, these were located on Goldings Hill, Englands Lane, Nursery Road, between Albion Hill and Warren Hill, and York Hill.

Loughton's High Road was defined for centuries by the two historic inns at either end, the Crown and the King's Head. There were a few shops in between, and a cottage or two, but the bustling shopping centre we see today has only really come about since 1918.

However, the area was attractive to London merchants and business-people from the 17th century onwards as it provided the advantages both of a country retreat together with proximity to London; Loughton is less than 12 miles (19 km) from Charing Cross. But even now, this is not suburbia; the stout fences and high holly hedges of many houses recall a time not so long ago when it was necessary to keep out straying cattle and deer.

Dick Turpin (1705–1739), the notorious highwayman, made his mark in the area during his life of crime. In about 1734, the Widow Shelley, living in a farm on Traps Hill, was supposedly roasted over her own fire by Turpin until she confessed to where her money was hidden. In fact, his last spell of 'going straight' before he became a professional thief appears to have been in Buckhurst Hill, where between 1733 and 1734 he was a butcher. The area was no doubt convenient for deer-poaching, another of his 'trades'. Fear of his ruthless style of burglary led householders in Loughton to build 'Turpin traps', heavy wooden flaps let down over the top of the stairs and jammed in place with a pole against the upstairs ceiling. Some of these survived until the middle of the 20th century.

Although in excess of 50 dwellings over 200 years old remain, most of the grand houses built in the 17th and 18th centuries have gone. These were country retreats for wealthy City merchants and courtiers, but the gradual urbanisation of the area has left few of them intact. Loughton Hall and Alderton Hall in Loughton survive. A second wave of grand Victorian edifices, built by nouveau riche industrialists and magnates, survives in better order. North Haven and Loughton Lodge are examples. Here too, though, there have been losses, such as Brooklyn in Loughton, the home of the influential Gould family, demolished to make way for Loughton Library. These houses required armies of domestic servants, which in turn attracted more people to the area.

== Victorian era ==
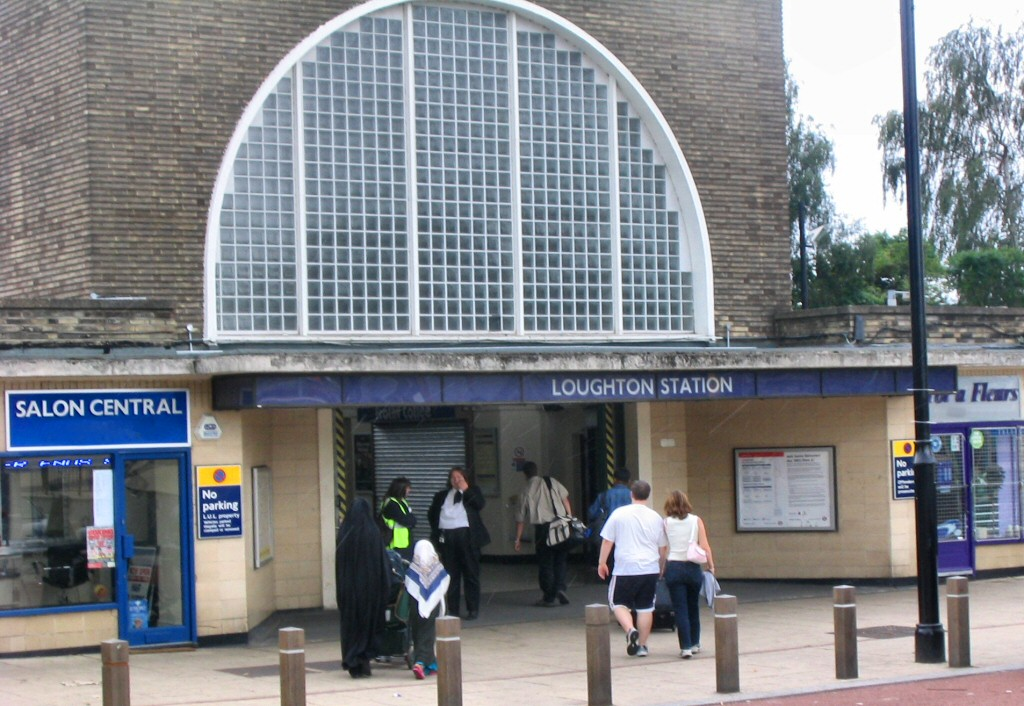
Loughton underground station

In Wright's History of Essex published in 1835, Loughton is described as 'distinguished by its numerous genteel houses and beautiful and picturesque scenery'.

Like other parts of Essex, Loughton also had a strong tradition of nonconformism, and the area is liberally supplied with chapels and meeting halls of varying Protestant traditions. The Baptists founded their chapel in Loughton from 1813. After a brief false start in Chigwell in 1827, Methodism came late to the area, surprising in a district so well trod by John Wesley. A chapel was established in England's Lane in 1873 by Edward Pope, while after a spell in Forest Road, Loughton, a new site was established in 1886, in High Road opposite Traps Hill. The red-brick Gothic-style church by architect Josiah Gunton, erected in 1903, was replaced in 1987 by a strikingly modern building which is quite a Loughton landmark. Congregationalists were active in Chigwell from 1804, and in Loughton shared the Baptist Chapel as a Union Church.

Before the railways, there were regular stagecoaches from Loughton to London, and the turnpike through Loughton was an important stagecoach route through to Cambridge, Norwich, Newmarket, and other East Anglian towns.

Beyond the High Road, the arrival of the railway in 1856 spurred the town's development. Loughton's growth was essentially infilling and expansion within an ancient village, but it was a slow process. Very roughly, the west side of the High Road being developed from about 1881 up to the First World War, and the east side largely being built up in the Edwardian and interwar periods.

The railway first came to Loughton in 1856, when the Eastern Counties Railway (later the Great Eastern Railway) opened a branch line via Woodford. This was extended in 1865 to Ongar. The loop line from Leytonstone to Woodford which takes in, inter alia, Hainault, Grange Hill, Chigwell and Roding Valley tube stations, was opened in 1903. After the Second World War, these services were electrified in stages and handed to London Transport's Central line. Electrification was completed as far as Loughton on 21 November 1948 (including the loop line), with the section to Epping completed on 26 September 1951. After years of decline, the final section of this line, from Epping to Ongar, was closed in 1994. The arrival of the railway was undoubtedly a key factor in the growth of the area, and also provided visitors with a convenient and cheap means of reaching Epping Forest, transforming it into the "East Enders' Playground".

The railways brought a tourist boom to the forest, and Loughton's streets rang to the shouts of Cockneys making their way to the forest. Tea rooms sprang up everywhere to cater for the thirsty trippers, and at weekends hordes of cyclists poured out of London seeking the tranquility and beauty which the forest offered. The tourist invasion was not universally welcomed; the visitors were condemned by some as insanitary, irreligious, and disruptive, and Loughton was long nicknamed 'Lousy Loughton' from the lice and fleas purportedly left behind by East Enders.

The Ragged School Union began organising visits to the Forest by organised parties of poor East End children in 1891. Shortly afterwards, Loughton became the focus for their operations. Trainloads of children - with metal identity tags and locked into carriages - were brought on special trains in their thousands every summer, to be marched up Station Road and Forest Road to the Shaftesbury Retreat. The trains were paid for by Pearson's Fresh Air Fund, a charity promoted by a publishing magnate. The Retreat offered pony rides, funfair side-shows, a sit-down tea and a romp in the forest. Some local residents regarded the trips, which continued into the 1930s as a nuisance, and local streets and parts of the forest were sprayed with disinfectant after the children had passed through!

== Twentieth century ==
Direct omnibus services linked Loughton to London from 1915. The old No. 10 route from Victoria to Abridge via Loughton survived until 1976 (a modern derivative, paid for by Essex County Council, again numbered 10, linked Loughton and Abridge until 2007), and the No. 20 service from Leyton to Epping survives, though it has terminated in Loughton since 1976 and now only runs from Walthamstow to Debden. The No. 167 route runs from Loughton to Ilford.

During the First World War, anti-aircraft positions were located in Epping Forest as part of the wider defences of London, but action was minor compared to the Second World War.

On the very first day of the Blitz, 7 September 1940 ("Black Saturday"), a Hurricane from 303 Squadron crashed onto an air-raid shelter in Roding Road, killing three occupants. The Polish pilot bailed out, and was promptly arrested as he could speak virtually no English. Also killed by "friendly fire" was PC Albert Hinds, blown up outside Loughton Police Station by a shell from an anti-aircraft battery in Nursery Road. Two A.R.P. men nearby died later from their injuries. A memorial plaque placed on the police station in 2005 commemorates all Loughton's civilian war dead; it is one of very few UK civilian war memorials. Even before the Blitz had begun, there was sporadic German bombing; two people were killed in The Drive on 26 July 1940, the first fatalities of the war in the London Civil Defence Region. In a 1941 raid, farms were damaged in Loughton and Debden, while a gun battery at Loughton Hall was hit, killing a soldier. At Staples Road Schools, the white-painted air-raid shelter directions are still clearly visible (but repainted at various times since): CASUALTY ENTRANCE - THROUGH AIRLOCK BY SANDBAGS. Staples Road school had until 2006 the unique distinction of having amongst its alumni both the Foreign Secretary, Jack Straw, and the chairman of the Foreign Affairs Select Committee, Mike Gapes.

There has been much post-war rebuilding and infilling; the church of St. Edmund of Canterbury, in Traps Hill, is an example of modern church architecture, built in 1958 following a disastrous fire in an earlier building. Another notable modern church is Loughton Methodist Church, opened in 1987. The Victorian St Mary's Church has had a foyer and modern hall attached in 2008 and all the pews removed. The police station was rebuilt in 1963/64. There has also been some post-war rebuilding of High Road shops, notably Centric Parade, which dates from 1983, but is effectively a new facade built on to the former London Cooperative Society supermarket, one of the largest in the UK when opened in 1962, with roof-top car park. The M11 motorway linking London to Cambridge passes very close to Loughton; this part of the motorway was opened in 1977. Light industrial units proliferated along the Roding valley between 1975 and 2000, notably in Langston Road where the Bank of England printing works is located. The printing works were taken over by De La Rue in 2003 when the company won the contract to print and supply UK banknotes. The headquarters of the UK greeting cards company Clinton Cards is also located in Langston Road.

From 1900 to 1933, Loughton was governed by the Loughton Urban District Council. From 1933 to 1974 it was part of the Chigwell Urban District together with Buckhurst Hill and Chigwell. Since 1996, Loughton has had its own town council.

== Twenty-first century ==
The headquarters of construction company Higgins Group plc on Langston Road made a significant addition to the townscape in 2005.

Following the 2002 ITV1 TV series Essex Wives, journalists used the phrase "golden triangle" to describe the three towns of Loughton, Chigwell, and Buckhurst Hill, for their general affluence and the up-front ostentation of some of their inhabitants.

When the German bombs landed in The Drive on 26 July 1940 killing two people, the German air force were not aiming for The Drive, their target was Loughton Station and the sidings, indeed the station was damaged probably from the same stick of bombs that landed in The Drive with such sad consequences. A bomb landed at the station damaging part of the track, platform and some seating area. above these seats were the enamel 'Loughton' signs, the sign on the blast side was damaged beyond recognition, but the sign on the leeward side survived with minor damage. this sign was saved by the station master and put into a maintenance cupboard on the station. Later the station master took the sign home as it was going to be scrapped. This information came from the station master's son in 1985.
