= John Maitland =

John Maitland may refer to:

- Sir John Maitland, 1st Lord Maitland of Thirlestane (1537–1595), Commendator of Coldingham Priory
- John Maitland, 1st Earl of Lauderdale (died 1645), Viscount of Lauderdale, Viscount Maitland and Lord Thirlestane & Boltoun, 2nd Lord Maitland of Thirlestane
- John Maitland, 1st Duke of Lauderdale (1616–1682), 2nd Earl of Lauderdale
- John Maitland, 5th Earl of Lauderdale (1655–1710), Scottish judge and politician
- John Maitland (Haddington MP) (1732–1779), MP for Haddington Burghs, 1774–1880
- John Maitland (Chippenham MP) (c. 1754–1831), MP for Chippenham, 1806–1812 and 1817–1818
- John Maitland (Royal Navy officer) (1771–1836), Royal Navy admiral
- John Maitland (accountant) (1803–1865), accountant to the Court of Session
- John Gorham Maitland (1818–1863), English academic and civil servant
- John Maitland (Kirkcudbright MP) (1841–1922), MP for Kirkcudbright, 1874–1880
- Sir John Maitland (Conservative politician) (1903–1977), MP for Horncastle, 1945–1966
- John Maitland (British Army officer) (1732–1779), British commander in American Revolutionary War
- John Maitland (The Bill), a fictional police officer in the TV series The Bill
- Jack Maitland (born 1948), American football player
- John Whitaker Maitland (1831–1909), rector of Loughton, lord of the manor, and owner of Loughton Hall
- John Maitland (Illinois politician), member of the Illinois Senate, 1979–2002
- John Alexander Fuller Maitland (1856–1936), British music critic and scholar
- Johnnie Maitland (1914–1988), Australian sports shooter
