= Willingale =

Willingale may refer to:

- Willingale, Essex
- Willingale Airfield, RAF Station Chipping Ongar, a former World War II airfield in Essex, England

== People ==
- Thomas Willingale
- Betty Willingale
