= Strevens =

Strevens is an English surname. Notable people with the surname include:

- Ben Strevens (born 1980), English footballer and manager
- John Strevens (1902–1990), English artist
- Leofranc Holford-Strevens (born 1946), English scholar

== See also ==
- Stevens (surname)
