= William Whitaker Maitland =

High sheriff of Essex

William Whitaker Maitland (1794-1861) was a British landowner, and High Sheriff of Essex in 1836.

He was the son of John Maitland, politician and landowner.

He inherited Woodford Hall, a large house in Woodford, Essex, with 50 acres of land adjacent to Epping Forest, and the nearby Loughton Hall and their manors from his father.

In 1851, he owned 1,120 acres in Loughton, let out as ten separate farms. He was recorded as being the patron of the living of the village's parish church in 1848.

He leased Woodford Hall to William Cox, and in 1840, to William Morris, father of William Morris the textile designer, poet, and socialist activist, then aged 6.

His third son, the Reverend John Whitaker Maitland, was the rector of Loughton, and lord of the manor.
