= Ron Moulton =

English author and editor

- Born: Ronald Godfrey Moulton; 15 May 1924; Loughton, Essex, England
- Died: 8 October 2010 (aged 86); Bushey, Hertfordshire, England
- Citizenship: United Kingdom
- Occupations: author and editor
- Spouse: Betty Moulton
- Children: a son and two daughters

Ronald Godfrey Moulton (1924–2010) was an English author and editor, notable for his work in the field of scale models and aeromodelling.

== Biography ==
Moulton was born in Loughton Essex in 1924. Watching the Alan Cobham Flying Circus, at the age of 10, inspired his interest in aircraft, and especially in modelling. In 1940, he trained at RAF Halton, initially working on aircraft, before being posted to Pietersberg, South Africa, in order to service Airspeed Oxford monoplanes.

In the post-WW2 period, Moulton was credited with introducing control line models, initially to Great Britain, and then to Continental Europe. Moulton wrote extensively about model aircraft, model engines and kites. He worked as an editorial assistant at the Aeromodeller magazine, becoming its editor in 1959.

Moulton's interest and promotion of human-powered aircraft led to him acting as observer for the Royal Aeronautical Society for the 1979 Kremer prize-winning flight of the Gossamer Albatross across the English Channel. In 1981, he was an observer for the Solar Challenger flight between Pontoise – Cormeilles Aerodrome, north of Paris, to Manston Royal Air Force Base in Manston, Kent.

In retirement, Moulton lived in Bushey, Hertfordshire. He had been married to Betty, who pre-deceased him, and together they had a son and two daughters.

== Publications ==
Moulton's books include:

=== As author ===
- — (1956). Flying scale models, etc. Watford, UK: Model Aeronautical Press.
- — (1958). Model aero engine encyclopaedia. Watford, UK: Model Aeronautical Press.
- — (1961). Control line manual : A complete review of all methods of controlling model aircraft in circular flight, etc. Watford, UK: Model Aeronautical Press.
- — (1963). Modern aeromodelling. London, UK: Faber & Faber.
- — (1968). Modern aeromodelling (2nd ed.). London, UK: Faber & Faber.
- — (1969). Control line manual : A complete review of all methods of controlling model aircraft in circular flight, etc (1969 ed.). Hemel Hempstead, UK: Model and Allied Publications.
- — (1974). Modern aeromodelling (revised ed.). London, UK: Faber & Faber. ISBN 0571048528.
- — (1978). Kites. with Pat Lloyd, illustrator. London, UK: Pelham. ISBN 072070829X.

=== As co-author ===
- — & Lloyd, Pat (1992). Kites : a practical handbook. Argus. ISBN 185486050X.

=== As editor ===
- Laidlaw-Dickson, D.J. & —, eds. (1963). Aeromodeller Annual 1963-64. Watford, Herts, UK: Model Aeronautical Press.
- Laidlaw-Dickson, D.J. & —, eds. (1964). Aeromodeller Annual 1964-65. Watford, Herts, UK: Model Aeronautical Press.
- Laidlaw-Dickson, D.J. & —, eds. (1965). Aeromodeller Annual 1965-66. Hemel Hempstead, Herts, UK: Model Aeronautical Press.
- Laidlaw-Dickson, D.J. & —, eds. (1966). Aeromodeller Annual 1966-67. Hemel Hempstead, Herts, UK: Model Aeronautical Press.
- Laidlaw-Dickson, D.J. & —, eds. (1967). Aeromodeller Annual 1967-68. Hemel Hempstead, Herts, UK: Model Aeronautical Press.
- — & Laidlaw-Dickson, D.J., eds. (1968). Aeromodeller Annual 1968-69. Hemel Hempstead, Herts, UK: Model and Allied Publications.
- — & Laidlaw-Dickson, D.J., eds. (1969). Aeromodeller Annual 1969-70. Hemel Hempstead, Herts, UK: Model and Allied Publications.
- — & Laidlaw-Dickson, D.J., eds. (1970). Aeromodeller Annual 1970-71. Hemel Hempstead, Herts, UK: Model and Allied Publications.
- — & Laidlaw-Dickson, D.J., eds. (1971). Aeromodeller Annual 1971-72. Hemel Hempstead, Herts, UK: Model and Allied Publications.
- — & Laidlaw-Dickson, D.J., eds. (1972). Aeromodeller Annual 1972-73. Hemel Hempstead, Herts, UK: Model and Allied Publications.
- —, ed. (1973). Aeromodeller Annual 1973-74. Hemel Hempstead, Herts, UK: Model and Allied Publications.
- —, ed. (1974). Aeromodeller Annual 1974-75. Hemel Hempstead, Herts, UK: Model and Allied Publications.
- —, ed. (1975). Aeromodeller Annual 1975-76. Hemel Hempstead, Herts, UK: Model and Allied Publications.
- —, ed. (1976). Aeromodeller Annual 1976-77. Watford, UK: Model and Allied Publications. ISBN 9780852424650.
- —, ed. (1977). Aeromodeller Annual 1977-78. Watford, UK: Model and Allied Publications. ISBN 0852425503.
- —, ed. (1978). Aeromodeller Annual 1978-79. Watford, UK: Model and Allied Publications. ISBN 0852426267.
