= Thomas Willingale =

Thomas Willingale (1799–1870), lived in the village of Loughton in Essex, United Kingdom. He was instrumental in the preservation of Epping Forest (which struggle was seminal in the national and indeed international conservation movement) and is still remembered for his actions. He is commemorated by an article in the Oxford Dictionary of National Biography, on which this article is based.

"Lopping" was the ancient practice of cutting or lopping the boughs and branches of trees by commoners for use as fuel during winter. Thomas Willingale was a man who guarded this right, and every November 11 at midnight, he went into the forest as he believed that if no-one started lopping at the appointed hour, the rights would be lost forever.

In 1860, the lords of the manor were encroaching on the forest to stop the commoners from practicing their lopping rights. There is a legend which cannot be proved or disproved, but is still commonly told in Loughton, that the major local landowner, William Whitaker Maitland, tried to end this custom by inviting all those with rights to lop to a supper at the King's Head pub (now a restaurant in the "Zizzi" chain), in Loughton High Road. He was hoping that by midnight, they would all be too drunk to go into the forest and exercise their rights. The legend says that Thomas Willingale realised treachery was afoot, and at midnight he lopped off a branch before triumphantly returning to the King's Head.

Four years later, the Revd John Whitaker Maitland enclosed 1,318 acres (5 km^{2}) of forest land, with the intention of selling this on for building or horticulture. Thomas Willingale was incensed by this further erosion of commoner rights in the forest and decided to fight the enclosure. He continued to lop and was prosecuted at Waltham Abbey court; some members of his family, though not Thomas himself, were imprisoned as a result. Luckily a number of well-to-do people came to Thomas's aid, promising support and more importantly financial help. These included Sir Thomas Fowell Buxton of Warlies, a prominent landowner, his brother Edward North Buxton of Knighton, a leading member of the Commons Preservation Society and John T. Bedford, a member of the City of London Corporation.

Eventually the City of London Corporation was persuaded to take on the landowners and “secure for the People, for the purposes of public health and recreation” the remainder of the forest of Epping. Legal proceedings by the Corporation, against the enclosures began August 1871 resulting, ultimately, in the Epping Forest Act 1878.

Unfortunately, Thomas Willingale died in 1870 and was unable to see the forest given the protection it deserved. The abolition of lopping was, however, part of this settlement.

Today, Epping Forest is still enjoyed for recreation by thousands of people each year. The forest itself is protected from development of any kind, and as a result still stretches from the heart of East London out into the Essex countryside, a green lung for the area which has of course become much more built up since 1878. Thomas Willingale is commemorated in Loughton by the street name Willingale Road, the Thomas Willingale School, and formerly had a pub named after him in Chingford (renamed "The Station House" in 2006). The Lopping Hall in Loughton was paid for out of compensation money for extinguishment of the lopping rights. It contains a carved hornbeam memorial tablet to Willingale and its north entrance includes a terracotta pediment illustrating loppers at work in the forest. There is a blue plaque on the wall of St John's Churchyard, where Willingale is buried in an unmarked pauper's grave. There is no known likeness of Willingale. Those extant in the town are of his son, also Thomas.
