= Debden Park High School =

Location
- Willingale Road; Loughton, Essex, IG10 2BQ; England; 51.65436°N 0.08979°E

Information
- Type: Academy
- Motto: Be your own future
- Established: 1999-09-01
- Department for Education URN: 136555 Tables
- Ofsted: Reports
- Headteacher: Helen Gascoyne
- Gender: Coeducational
- Age: 11 to 18
- Enrolment: 1050
- Colours: Navy blue and white
- Website: http://www.debdenparkhigh.essex.sch.uk/

Debden Park High School is a mixed academy school situated in Loughton. The current headteacher is Helen Gascoyne, and the previous one, being Cristian Cavanagh, was appointed in April 2007, succeeding Michael Moore.

On average, there are 1050 students on roll.
