= Essex Wives =

2002 British television series

Essex Wives was a television documentary series about married women socialising together in Essex, England. It ran for a single series in 2002 and launched the career of Jodie Marsh.

== Format ==
The ITV programme featured the daily lives of a number of women, including Jodie Marsh, which led to her subsequent career. The show used the nickname golden triangle to describe the settlements of Chigwell, Buckhurst Hill and Loughton in the Epping Forest district upon which the series was centred. The area is well known for its high property prices and relative affluence of its residents compared to the national average. Several properties are owned by professional footballers; their spouses, as well as others of a similar stature, have been referred to as WAGs by the tabloid press. They are relatively rich, but do not work regularly and chose to spend most of the day socialising instead.

The programme featured stereotypical activities of these women, such as visiting Jacuzzis, nail bars, tanning, shopping at Prada or performing yoga. It was criticised for giving an inaccurate portrayal of Essex life; towns elsewhere in the county such as Halstead and Colchester or natural features such as the Colne Valley do not generally exhibit the behaviour seen on Essex Wives, including "white stilettos, shiny leatherette handbags or ankle chains". The series pointed out that Chigwell has ten beauty salons and four nail bars, and said that some of the wives had decided to seek modelling jobs for their young children.
