= John Whitaker Maitland =

John Whitaker Maitland (1831–1909) was the rector of Loughton, lord of the manor, and owner of Loughton Hall.

== Early life ==
He was the third son of William Whitaker Maitland, landowner and High Sheriff of Essex. He was educated at Harrow School, and Trinity Hall, Cambridge.

== Career ==
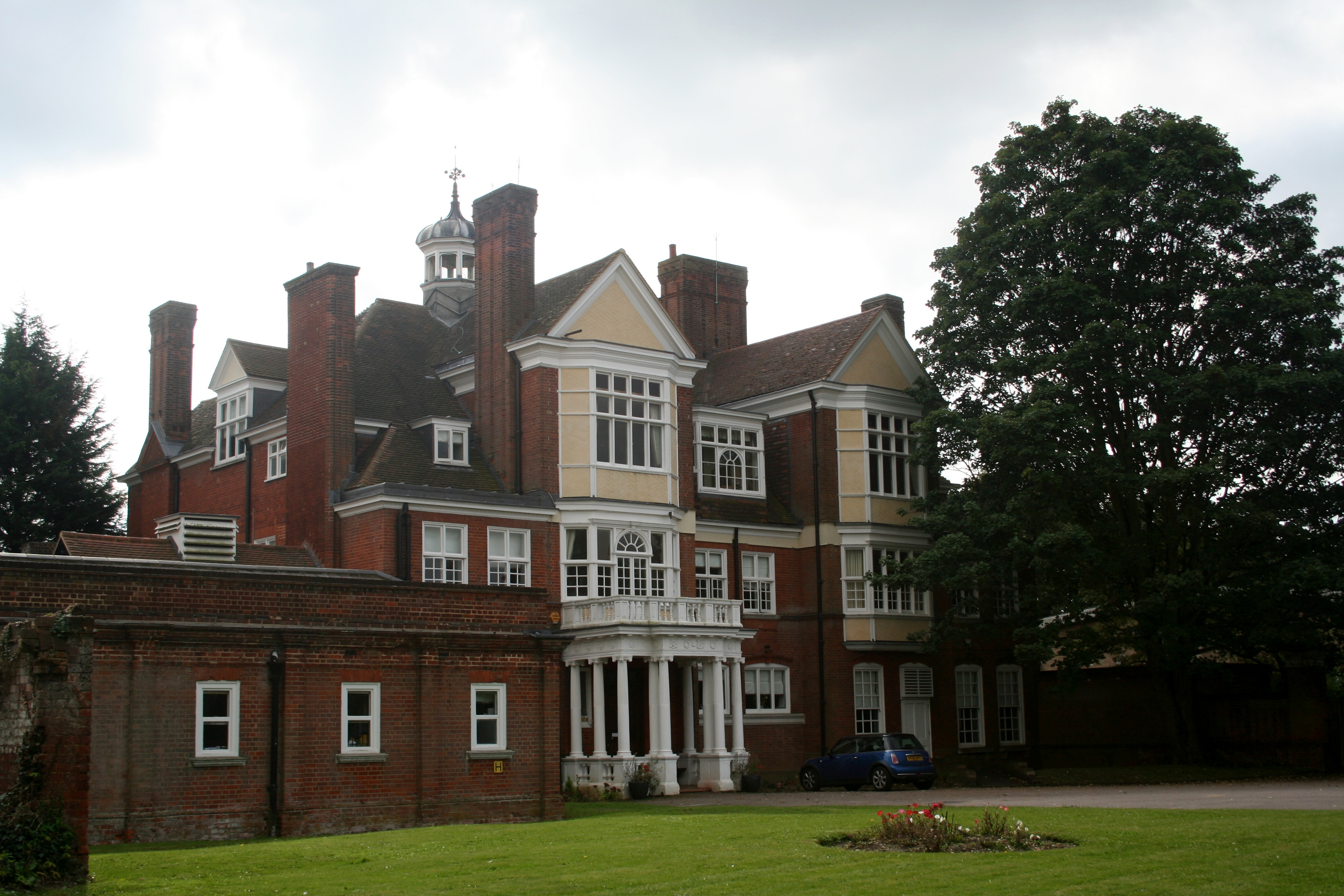
Loughton Hall in 2013

Loughton Hall had been destroyed by fire in 1836, and after Maitland received £30,000 from the City of London for enclosing parts of Epping Forest which he owned, he rebuilt in 1878.

It was designed by William Eden Nesfield in a mock Jacobean style.

== Personal life ==
He married Venetia Neave, daughter of Sir Digby Neave, 3rd Baronet and Hon. Mary Arundell.

He is the grandfather of the politician Sir John Maitland through his son William Whitaker Maitland.
