= John Strevens =

English painter

John Frederick Lloyd Strevens (1902–1990) was a British artist who regularly exhibited at the Royal Academy, the Royal Society of British Artists, the Royal Society of Portrait Painters and the Paris Salon.

Strevens was born in London and studied at Heatherley's School of Fine Art but was a largely self-taught painter. His early life in Edwardian England continued to inspire his work. He would regularly use his wife and daughters as models for his paintings. His first one-man show in 1947 featured "The Three Princesses" which depicted his daughters Josephine, Victoria and Virginia. In the 1960s he became particularly known for his oil paintings of children and flowers and was a successful portrait artist. Many of his paintings of children and flowers, were made into prints.

After his first wife's death he married Julia Marzo a Barcelona native and had a daughter, Bridget.

Twenty years after his death two of his paintings were donated by his daughter to his local hospital, St Margaret's in Epping, Essex; Strevens had been treated there for Parkinson's disease in later life. Many more of his paintings were auctioned, while some remained with his three daughters from his first marriage. A blue plaque to Strevens has been placed on his house, in Lower Park Road, Loughton.

Two of Strevens' paintings are in the collection of the British Council.
