= Chigwell Urban District =

Former local government area in the UK

Coordinates: 51.63°N 0.07°E

Chigwell
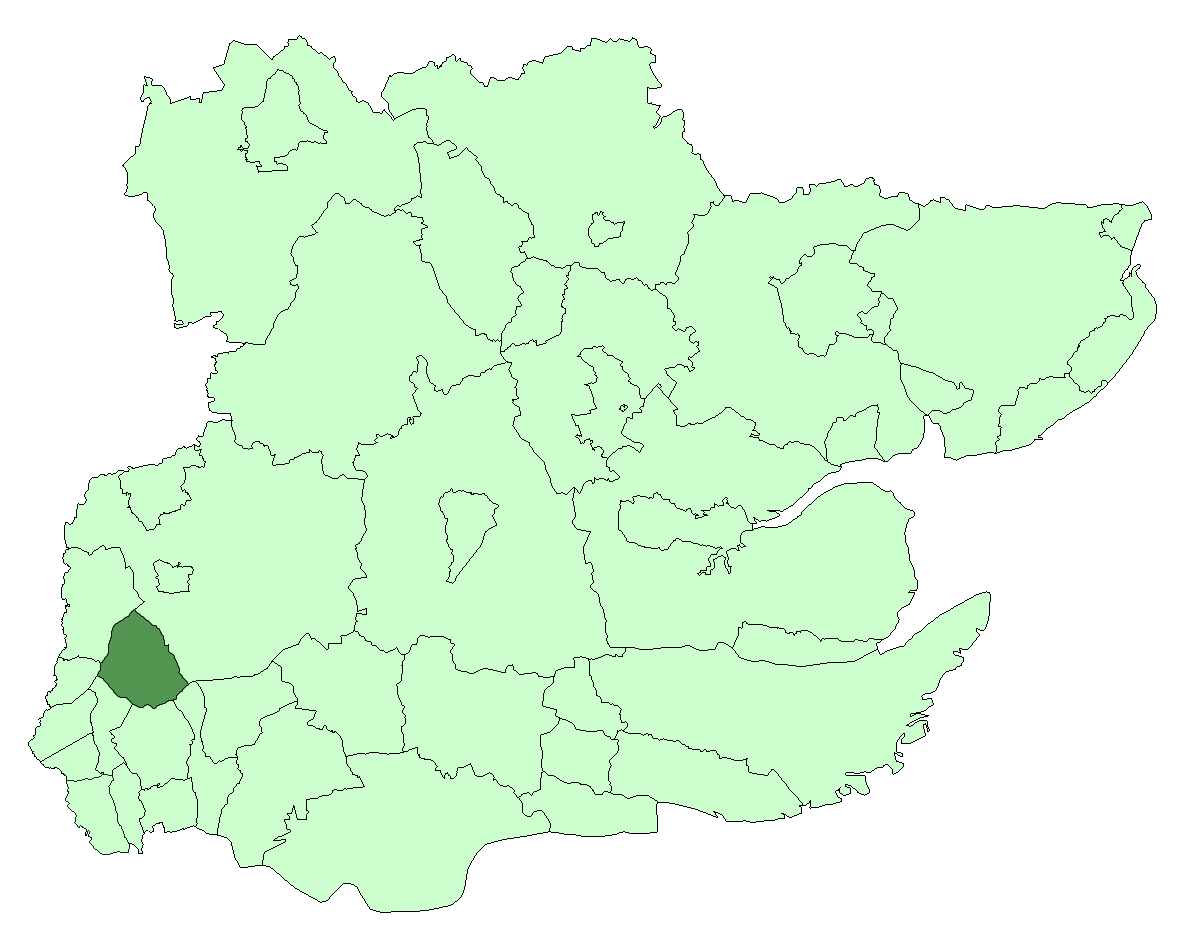
- Chigwell within Essex in 1961
- Area
  - 1933-1965: 8,971 acres (36.30 km^{2})
  - 1965-1974: 8,890 acres (36.0 km^{2})
- Population
  - 1939: 23,966
  - 1951: 51,802
  - 1971: 53,791
- Density
  - 1939: 2.7/acre
  - 1951: 5.8/acre
  - 1971: 6.1/acre
- History
  - Created: 1933
  - Abolished: 1974
  - Succeeded by: Epping Forest District; London Borough of Redbridge
- Status: Urban district
- Government
  - HQ: Loughton
  - Motto: Non Progredi est Regredi (Not to go forward is to go backward)
- Coat of arms of Chigwell Urban District Council

Chigwell was a local government district in south west Essex, England. It contained the settlements of Chigwell, Loughton and Buckhurst Hill; and formed part of the Metropolitan Police District.

== Formation ==
It was created an urban district by a county review order on 1 October 1933 as the merger of the former area of:

- Buckhurst Hill Urban District (874 acres)
- Loughton Urban District (3,962 acres)
- Chigwell civil parish only, from Epping Rural District (4,135 acres)

== Development ==
The district lay on the edge of the Greater London Conurbation and experienced a rapid population growth, in part caused by London County Council out-county construction at Loughton, the Urban District's headquarters, and also in the south east of the district of the Hainault Estate (which also extended into neighbouring Ilford and Dagenham). Extensive council house building by the Chigwell Urban District itself took place between Buckhurst Hill and Loughton.

In 1948, the New Works Programme of the London Passenger Transport Board brought the London Underground services of the Central line to six stations in the district; namely Roding Valley, Chigwell, Grange Hill, Buckhurst Hill, Loughton and Debden. The large LT Hainault depot was also mostly in the U.D.

== Coat of arms ==
The coat of arms were granted in 1951 and represent Or, a stag at rest proper, on a chief gules three axe-heads bendwise sinister with blades down-words argent.

== Abolition ==
The Royal Commission on Local Government in Greater London considered the entire district for inclusion in Greater London, however after strong local resistance, only a small area of 81 acres (330,000 m^{2}) around Hainault was transferred from the urban district and Essex to form part of the London Borough of Redbridge in Greater London in 1965. The population of this area in 1961 was 7,071.

On 1 April 1974 the remainder of the district was abolished by the Local Government Act 1972 and the area has since formed part of the Epping Forest District.
