= Debden House =

Building in Loughton, Essex, England

Coordinates: 51.6642°N 0.0784°E

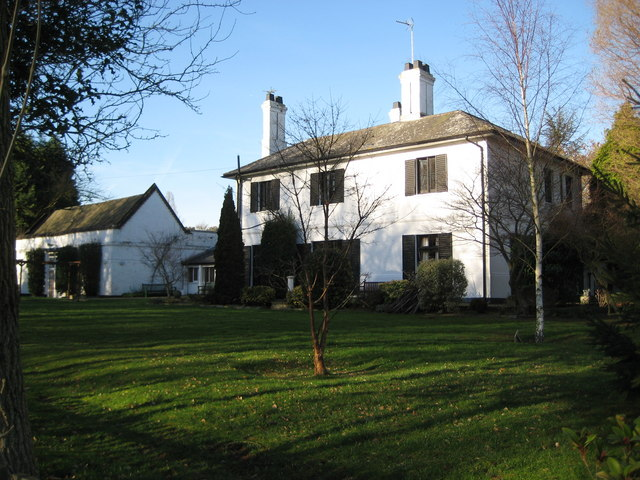
- Interactive map of the Debden House area

General information
- Owner: Newham London Borough Council

Website
- www.debdenhouse.com

Debden House is a conference centre and campsite located in Loughton, Essex, England. The house is owned and operated by Newham London Borough Council.

The house is used as a conference centre with residential facilities during the week, and is available for hire. Newham Borough Council use the house extensively for staff training, team-building exercises and conferences. Residential accommodation is available for students.

The campsite at Debden House is open from May to September every year. Facilities include a shop, cafe, washing and drying machines, electric points, toilets and showers.

== History ==
The house was built in the early 19th century and extended in both the 19th and 20th centuries. It is constructed in two storeys of painted brick with a slate roof to a rectangular floor plan and was probably a former coach house. It is now a grade II listed building

Formerly known as Debden Green House, it was once part of the Debden Hall estate, which in 1851 was owned by local magistrate John Williams. It was bought in 1883 by Joseph Thomas Palmer, a printing ink manufacturer, who lived there until his death in 1898, followed by his son-in-law until 1917. Debden Green House was bought at auction by Edward Green in 1920, who lived there until it was purchased by the Borough of East Ham in 1946. It was opened as the Debden House Residential Adult Education Centre in 1949.

== The Hamilton family ==
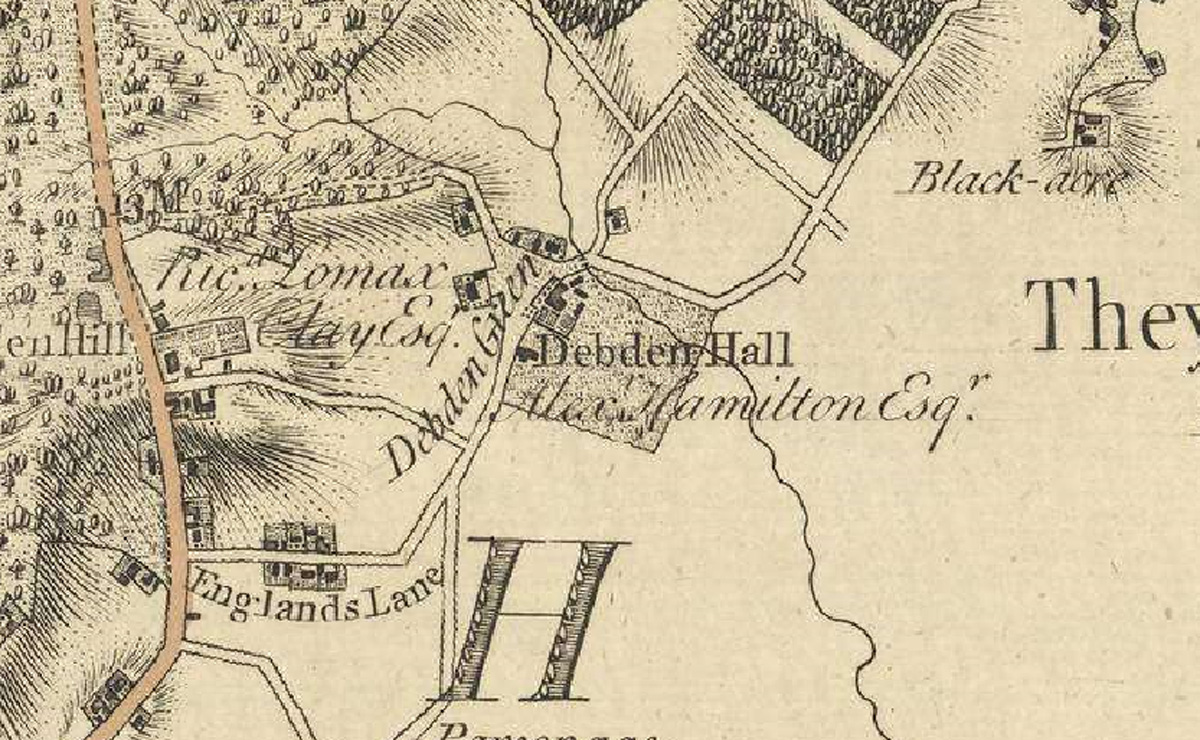
Map of 1777 of Debden Hall and Debden Green

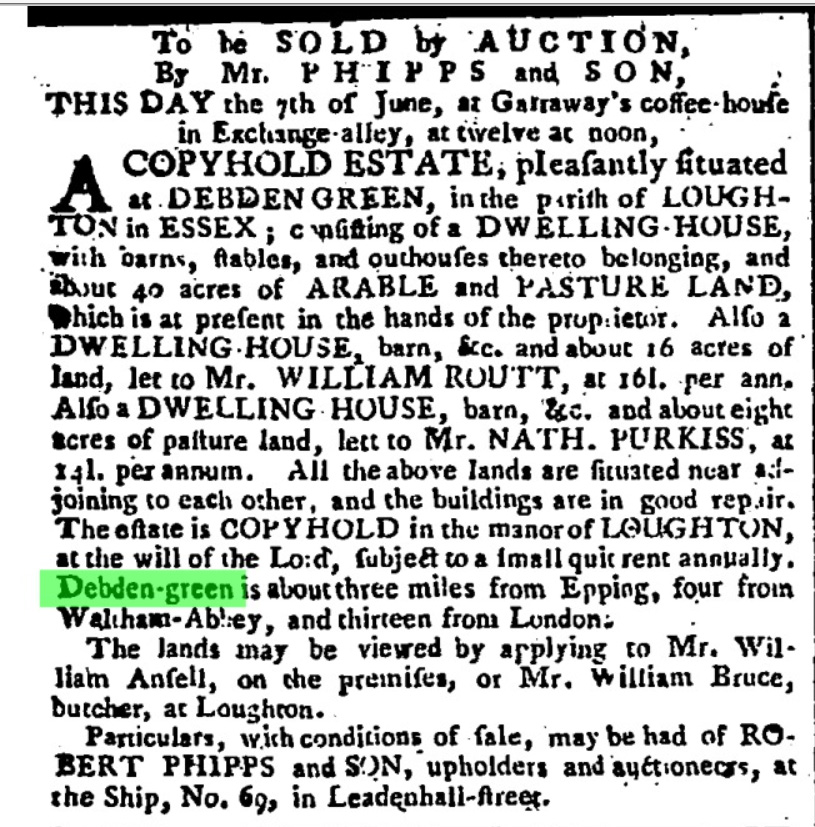
Sale notice of 1869

In the map of 1777, Alexander Hamilton (1693–1781) is shown to be the owner of Debden Hall and Debden House, Debden Green. He owned Debden Green House for many years before this as a newspaper advertisement of 1748 mentions that he can be contacted at his house on Debden Green. It seems that these houses existed before the Hall was built because in 1769 he unsuccessfully advertised them for sale. The sale notice is shown.

Alexander Hamilton was born in 1693. His father was William Hamilton, Lord of the Manor of Wishaw in Scotland. He became a lawyer and went to live at Lincoln's Inn in London. He married three times. His first wife was Frances Dalzell whom he married in 1720 but she died shortly afterwards. His second wife was Barbara Lilley whom he married in 1729 and by her he had two sons William and Anthony Hamilton. She also died and in 1745 he married Charlotte Stiles whose father Robert Stiles (1663–1739) was a landowner in Loughton.

He lived much of his life at Lincoln's Inn and died there in 1781 at the age of 88. It seems that he used Debden Hall and House as his country estate. When he died his eldest son William Hamilton (1730–1811) inherited his property. William was also a lawyer who lived at Lincoln's Inn. He married Sarah Allan and they had two daughters Sarah and Mary Hamilton.

William died in 1811 and as he had no sons his property was left to his nephew William Richard Hamilton. It seems that sometime after this both Debden House and the Hall were sold to Nicholas Pearse who was the husband of Sarah Hamilton, William's daughter. This is evident from a sale notice in 1846 for the 212-acre Debden Green Estate which describes the Hall and the House. This notice, which is shown, mentions that Nicholas Pearse was the owner.

Nicholas Pearse (1758–1825) was the son of a wealthy landowner and clothier also called Nicholas Pearse (1720–1793) from Heddington and he had inherited property when his father died in 1793. A portrait of his father was painted by Thomas Gainsborough in about 1760. In 1797 he married Sarah Hamilton who at this time would have been living at Debden Hall as her father William owned it. The couple had no children and when Nicholas died in 1825 he left Sarah a life interest in his estate and after that his will stated that it was to be sold and the proceeds should be put in a Trust to be distributed amongst distant relatives. After Nicholas died Sarah lived at Debden Hall until her death. The 1841 Census shows that she is living there with eight servants. She died in 1845 and the property was sold. It was bought by John Williams.

== Residents after 1850 ==
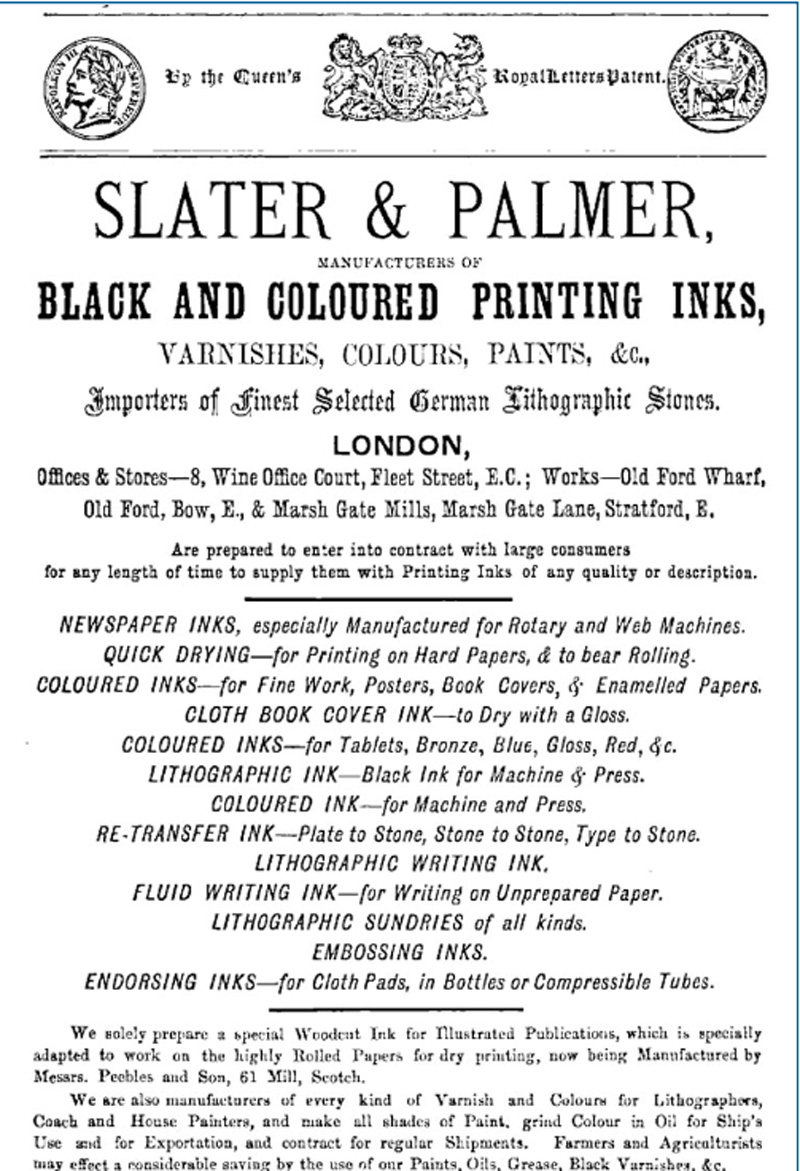
Advertisement for Slater and Palmer

John Williams (1792–1883) purchased the whole Debden Estate in about 1850. He was a Member of the London Stock Exchange and had retired to live the life of a Country Gentleman. It seems that he lived in the Hall and rented Debden House to various tenants. His obituary described him in the following terms.

"At the ripe old age of 91 Mr John Williams, familiarly known as “the Squire” died at his residence Deben Hall. The deceased gentleman was one of the oldest Members of the Stock Exchange and for many year was the Justice of the Peace for this county. He was a bachelor and during his latter years after having relinquished business lived a quiet unassuming life. He was of a most benevolent disposition and many were the bounties he distributed especially at Christmas time to the poor by whom he was greatly beloved. He was a staunch supporter of the various London hospitals to which he contributed large amounts."

He died in 1883 and his property was left to distant relatives. It was put on the market for sale. The sale notice lists the various properties in the Estate. As well as the Hall there was The Mount, The Beeches, Elm Cottage and Debden Green House which was described as a detached residence with stabling, gardens and paddock containing altogether about two acres.

The sale notice also states that he owned the Birch Hall Estate. The Debden Estate was bought by Joseph Thomas Palmer.

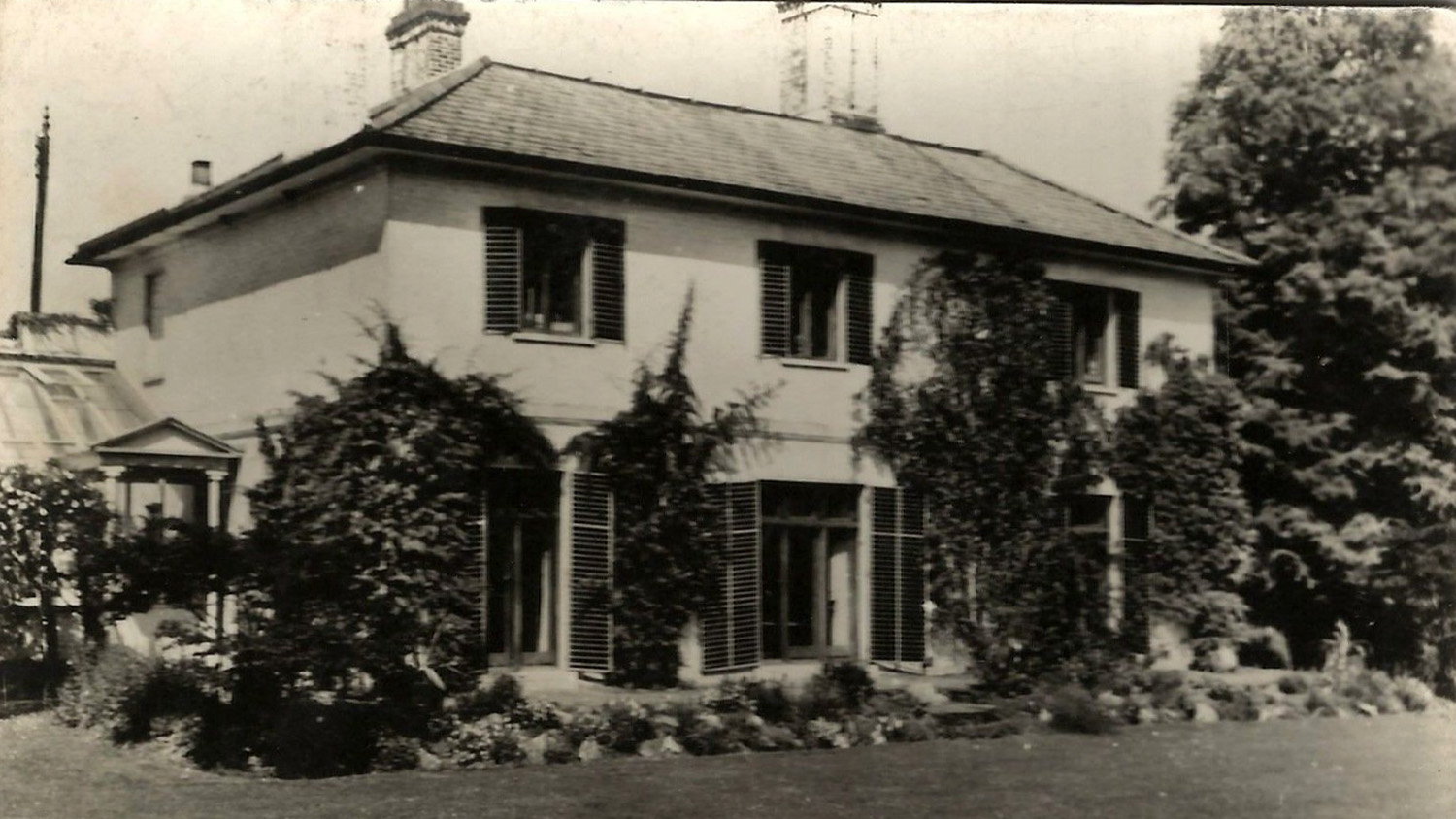
Debden House in about 1920

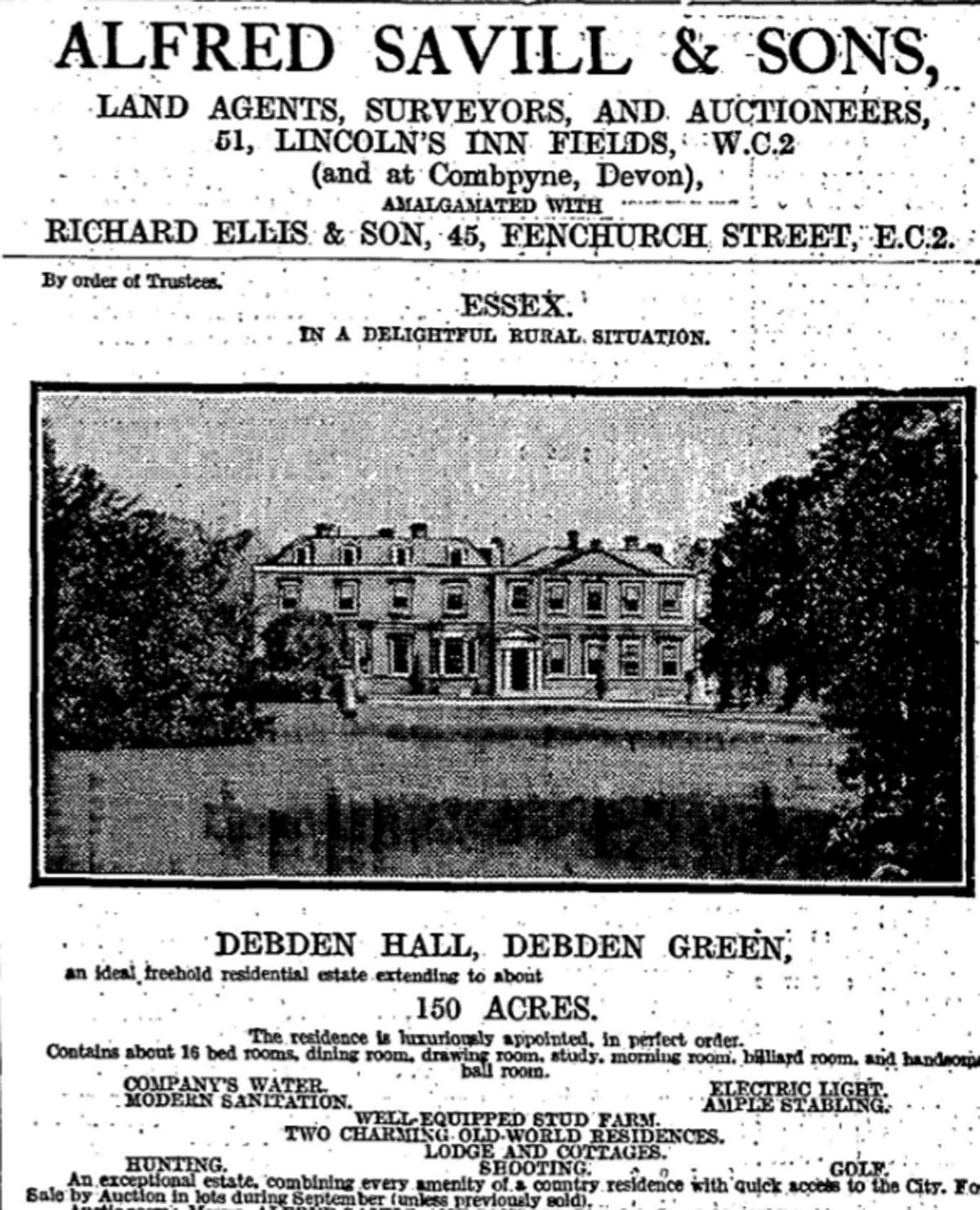
Sale notice for Debden Hall Estate in 1920

Joseph Thomas Palmer (1841–1895) was born in London. His father was Joseph Randall Palmer who manufactured printing ink. Joseph also became an ink manufacturer and was a partner in the firm Slater and Palmer which had a factory in London. He married twice his first wife died in 1863 and in 1867 he married Mary Ann Lellyett but she died in 1872 in a carriage accident in Walthamstow. His sister in law Ellen Lellyett was a spinster and as she had little money he employed her as his housekeeper. She is shown to be living at Debden Hall with the family in 1891. When Joseph died in 1895 he made provision for her in his will. She had an independent income and she was allowed to live at Debden Hall for the next three years after which it was left to his daughter Gertrude Lellyett Palmer.

Gertrude Lellyett Palmer (1868–1912) was born in 1868. In 1890 she married William Richard Clarke (1856-1917). The couple lived at Clare Hall in Chigwell for some years. Several years Gertrude inherited the property she put the whole Estate on the market for sale. In the advertisement Debden House is described as “a well-built freehold residence in a pleasant situation facing the Green containing eight bed and dressing rooms, bathroom, five reception rooms and domestic offices with stabling for three horses and pleasure and kitchen gardens.”

It seems that they decided not to sell the estate because the 1911 Census shows them both to be at Debden Hall with their daughter Dorothy, three visitors and eight servants. Gertrude died at the Hall in 1912 and William died in 1917. They are both buried at St John's Cemetery, Loughton.

In 1920 the estate was advertised for sale. The advertisement that appeared in “The Times” contained a picture of Debden Hall and this is shown. At this stage the estate was split and Debden House was sold separately to Edward Green. In 1947 the house was sold to the County Borough of East Ham whose successors Newham) still own it today.
