= Buckhurst Hill =

Town in Essex, England

Coordinates: 51.632°N 0.036°E

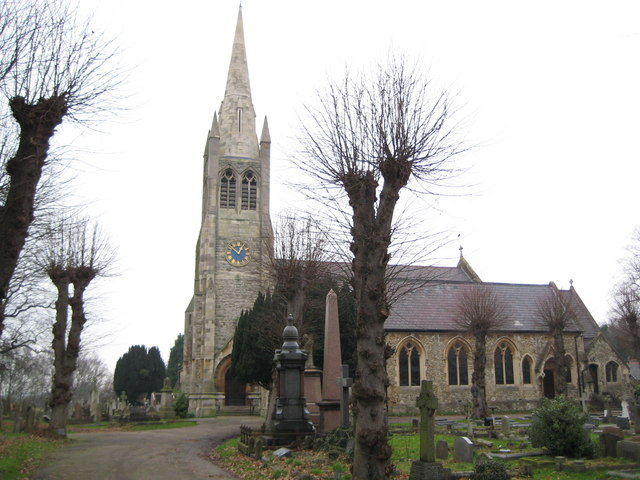
- The parish church of St John the Baptist, built in 1837

- Location within Essex
- Interactive map of Buckhurst Hill
- Population: 11,755 (Parish, 2021)
- OS grid reference: TQ415935
  - London: 11 mi (18 km) SW
- Civil parish: Buckhurst Hill
- District: Epping Forest
- Shire county: Essex
- Region: East
- Country: England
- Sovereign state: United Kingdom
- Post town: BUCKHURST HILL
- Postcode district: IG9
- Dialling code: 020
- Police: Essex
- Fire: Essex
- Ambulance: East of England
- UK Parliament: Epping Forest
- Website: Buckhurst Hill Parish Council

Buckhurst Hill is a town and civil parish in the Epping Forest District of Essex, England. It is inside the M25 London orbital motorway but lies just outside the administrative boundary of Greater London. It is adjacent to the northern boundary of the London Borough of Redbridge and is 11 miles (18 km) north-east of Charing Cross in central London. The area developed following the opening of Buckhurst Hill station in 1856 on what was originally a branch of the Eastern Counties Railway but now forms part of the Central line of the London Underground. At the 2021 census the parish had a population of 11,755.

== History ==
The name Buckhurst Hill is Old English and means a hill covered with beech trees. The earliest known mention of the name dates from the 12th century as La Bocherste. In 1135 the "wood of Buckhurt" was granted to Stratford Langthorne Abbey, which then owned it until the abbey's dissolution in 1538. In the 17th and 18th centuries the area was known as Bucket Hill before the name settled on its modern form.

In medieval times Buckhurst Hill lay within the bounds of Epping Forest and consisted of only a few scattered houses along the ancient route connecting Woodford to Loughton. This route through the forest was upgraded in the 17th century and became part of stagecoach routes between London and Cambridge, Norwich, Bury St Edmunds and Great Dunmow.

Buckhurst Hill formed part of the ancient parish of Chigwell in the Hundred of Ongar, but was separated from Chigwell village and the parish church there by the River Roding. Until 1890 there was no bridge over the river to link Buckhurst Hill to Chigwell. To reach Chigwell prior to 1890, Buckhurst Hill residents had to either ford the river or take a longer route via the bridges at Woodford or Loughton.

By the 1830s the population of Buckhurst Hill was large enough to need its own church. St John's Church was built in 1837 as a chapel of ease to Chigwell. It was assigned a chapelry district the following year, which was subsequently upgraded to being a separate ecclesiastical parish from Chigwell in 1867. In 1838, St John's National School was also built adjacent to the new church on land donated by the lord of the manor. The construction of the school cost £209, largely funded by donations from local residents.

Buckhurst Hill station opened in 1856 on the Eastern Counties Railway's branch line to Loughton. Following the arrival of the railway the area around the station was rapidly developed with new streets and suburban housing. Queens Road was laid out within a year of the station opening to serve as Buckhurst Hill's main commercial street, and the surrounding roads were laid out for housing, including numerous villas and grand houses. The population of Buckhurst Hill had been estimated to be 180 in 1838. By the 1861 census, the population of the ecclesiastical parish of Buckhurst Hill had grown to 787, and by 1884 the population had reached 4,000. Although never within London's administrative boundaries, as early as 1914 Buckhurst Hill was being described as a suburb of London.

The rapid development of Buckhurst Hill and other areas adjoining Epping Forest led to the clearing of some areas of the forest. Landowners pushed for further clearances, in which they were opposed by a public campaign to protect the remaining forest. These disputes culminated in the Epping Forest Act 1878 which gave statutory protection to the forest and passed responsibility for its management to the Corporation of London.

Whilst Buckhurst Hill had become a separate ecclesiastical parish in 1867, it remained part of the civil parish of Chigwell until 1894. When elected parish and district councils were established under the Local Government Act 1894, it was decided that the more developed Buckhurst Hill west of the Roding and the more rural part of Chigwell parish east of the Roding needed to be administered separately. The old parish was therefore split along the river, with Buckhurst Hill being removed from the parish of Chigwell to become its own urban district.

Buckhurst Hill Urban District was abolished in April 1933 when the area was merged with the parish of Chigwell (from which it had been separated less than 39 years earlier) and the Loughton Urban District to form the Chigwell Urban District. Buckhurst Hill continued to form a civil parish after the 1933 reforms, but as an urban parish it was ineligible to have a parish council; the lowest elected tier of local government between 1933 and 1974 was Chigwell Urban District Council.

The railway through Buckhurst Hill station was transferred to London Underground as part of the New Works Programme of 1935–1940. After diversion and electrification works, the route became part of the Central line in 1948.

Chigwell Urban District was abolished in 1974 when the area became part of the new Epping Forest District. The area of the former Chigwell Urban District became unparished as a result of the 1974 reforms. In 1996, three new civil parishes were created covering the area of the pre-1974 Chigwell Urban District: Buckhurst Hill, Chigwell, and Loughton.

== Geography ==
The town is located at the western edge of Essex, 11 miles (18 km) north-east of Charing Cross and bordering the London Borough of Redbridge. Parts of Epping Forest in Buckhurst Hill are intermingled with residential areas.

== Governance ==
There are three tiers of local government covering Buckhurst Hill, at parish, district, and county level: Buckhurst Hill Parish Council, Epping Forest District Council, and Essex County Council. The parish council is based at Buckhurst Hill Library on Queens Road.

== Transport ==
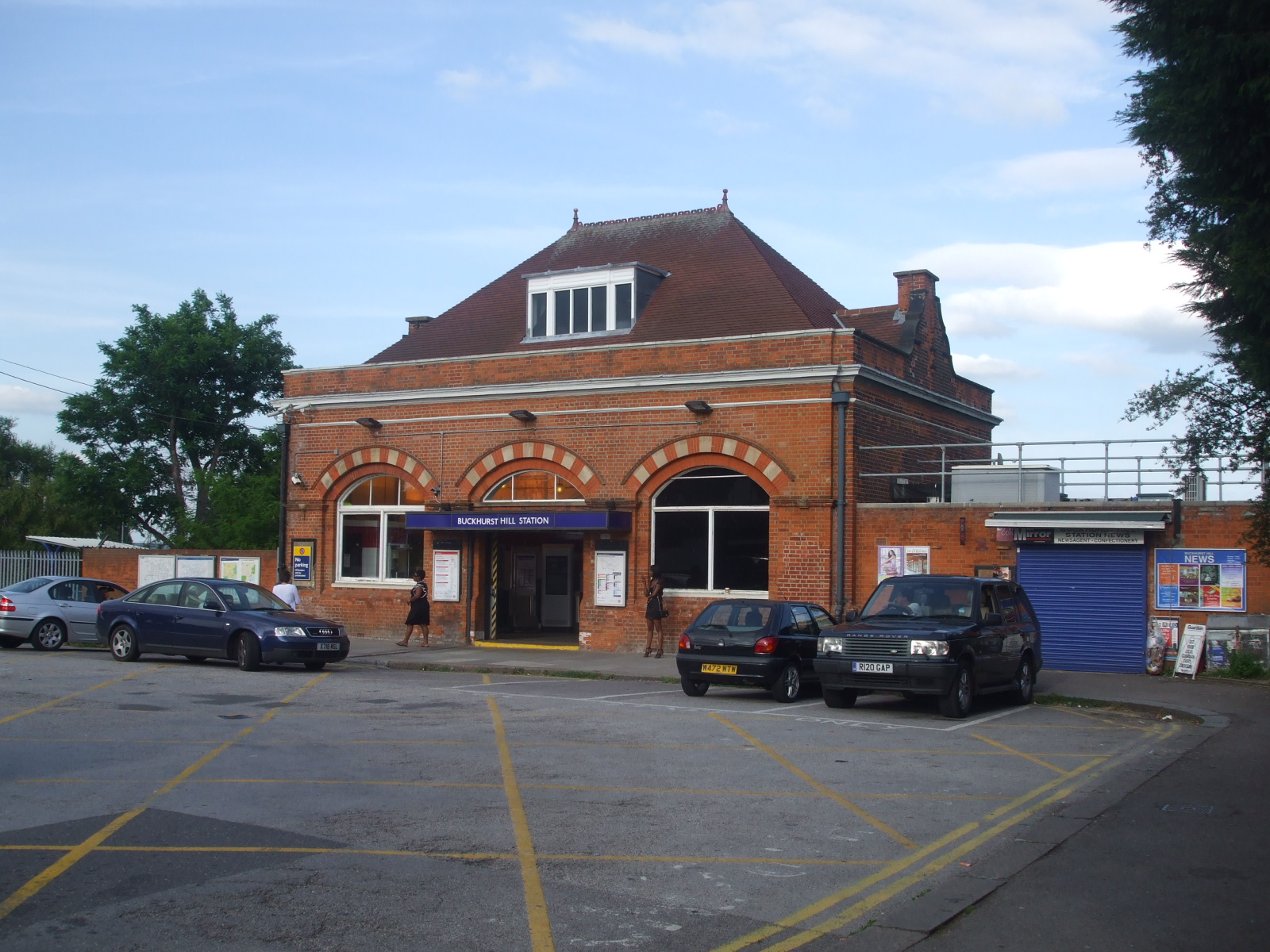
Buckhurst Hill station

Buckhurst Hill is served by two London Underground stations: Buckhurst Hill (in London fare zone 5) and Roding Valley (in zone 4), which are on the Central line. The line directly links the area to central London, as well as local areas including Woodford, South Woodford, Leytonstone, Epping and Loughton.

London Overground railway services from nearby Chingford station can be used to reach London Liverpool Street, via Walthamstow and Hackney.

Most bus routes serving Buckhurst Hill are London Buses services, operated by Stagecoach London. Services link the town with Chingford, Debden, Ilford, Loughton, Walthamstow and Woodford. Bus service 397 can be used to reach Chingford station.

== Sport ==
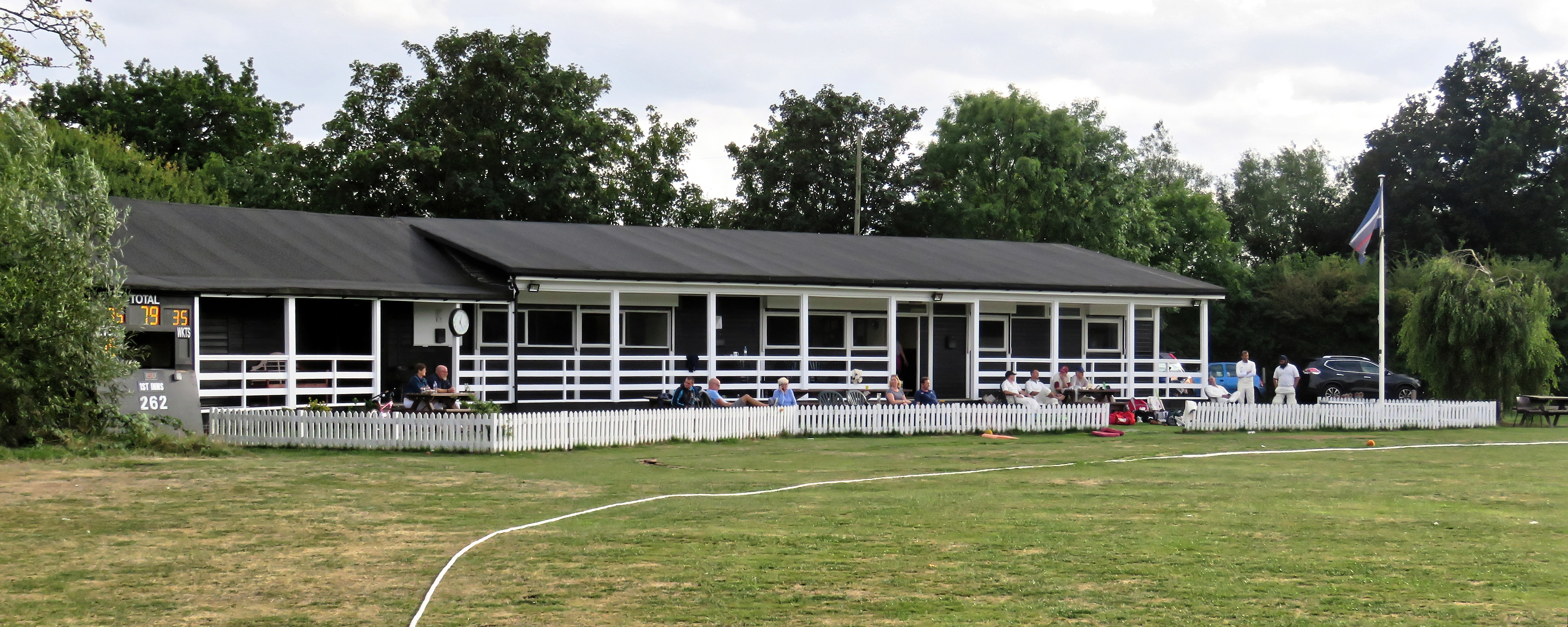
Buckhurst Hill Cricket Club

Buckhurst Hill F.C., known as "the Stags", has a ground at Roding Lane at the east of the town. Buckhurst Hill Cricket Club plays in the Shepherd Neame Essex League.

== Education ==
=== Primary ===
There are two state primary schools in the parish: Buckhurst Hill Community Primary School, and St John's (Church of England) School.

=== Secondary ===
There is no state secondary school in the parish. Roding Valley High School in Loughton provides secondary level education for the area. It was formed in 1989 by the merger of three schools: Loughton County High School for Girls, Buckhurst Hill County High School (for boys) and Epping Forest High School.

=== Independent ===
Braeside School was a fee-paying school; it closed in 2025. The Daiglen School is a small independent preparatory school on Palmerston Road.

== Notable people ==
- Sir William Addison (1905–1992) – historian and author, lived in Buckhurst Hill and owned a bookshop in Loughton.
- Richard Crossman, Labour politician, was born and grew up in Buckhurst Hill.
- Mark Knopfler, musician, lived in Buckhurst Hill for a while when he first moved to London and was still an English teacher.
- Daniel Mays, actor, grew up in Buckhurst Hill.
- Jack Straw, Labour politician, was born in Buckhurst Hill.
- Dick Turpin moved to Buckhurst Hill in 1725.
