= Loughton =

Town in southwest Essex, England

Coordinates: 51.6494°N 0.0735°E

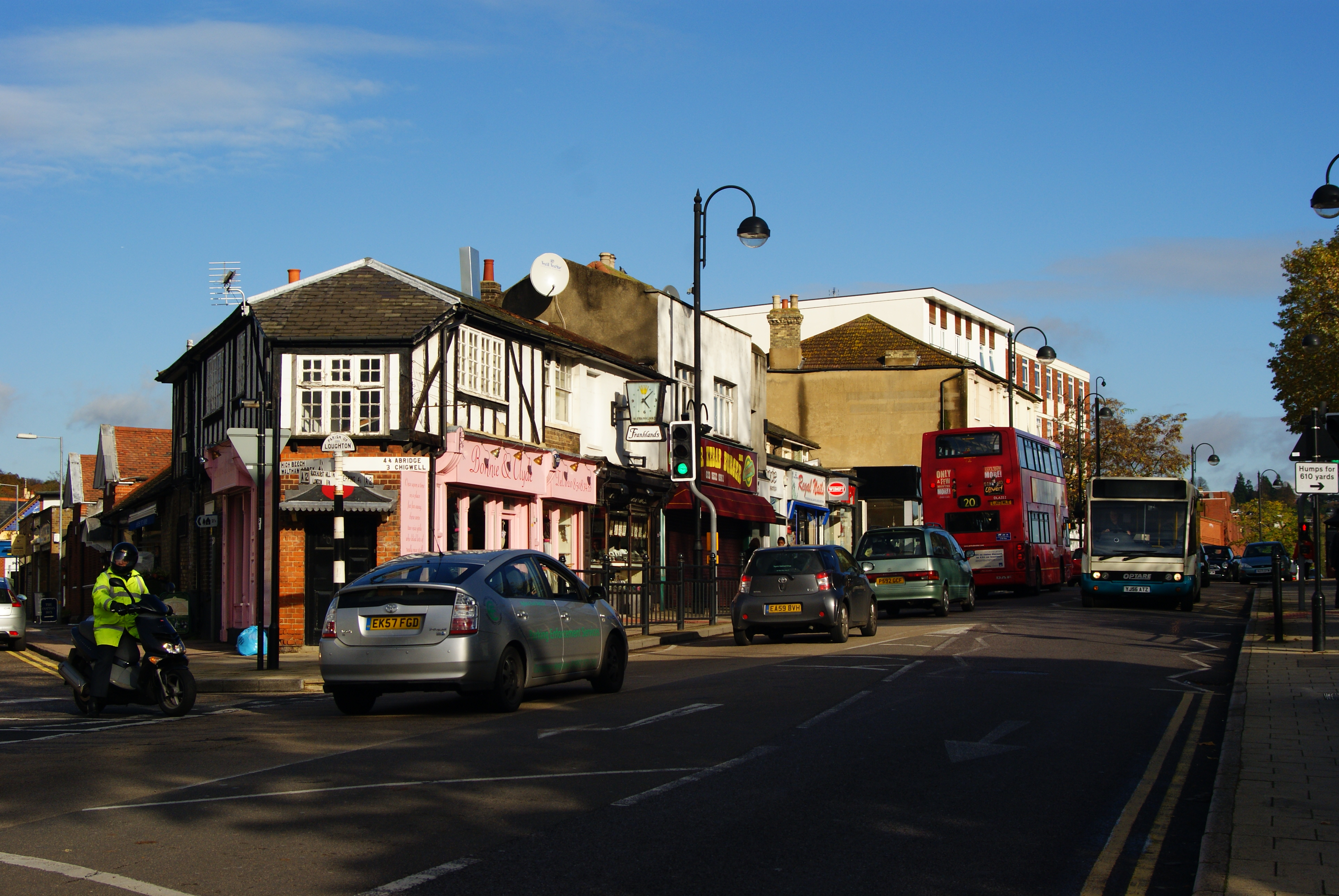
- High Road, Loughton
- Interactive map of Loughton
- Area: 15.30 km^{2} (5.91 sq mi)
- Population: 33,346 (Parish, 2021)
  - Density: 2,179/km^{2} (5,640/sq mi)
- OS grid reference: TQ422961
  - Charing Cross: 12 mi (19 km) SW
- Civil parish: Loughton
- District: Epping Forest
- Shire county: Essex
- Region: East
- Country: England
- Sovereign state: United Kingdom
- Post town: LOUGHTON
- Postcode district: IG10
- Dialling code: 020
- Police: Essex
- Fire: Essex
- Ambulance: East of England
- UK Parliament: Epping Forest
- Website: http://www.loughton-tc.gov.uk

Loughton (/ˈlaʊtən/) is a town and civil parish in the Epping Forest District of Essex, England. It is inside the M25 London orbital motorway but lies just outside the administrative boundary of Greater London. It lies 13 miles (21 km) north-east of Charing Cross in central London. The parish has two stations on the Central line of the London Underground: Loughton and Debden. At the 2021 census the parish had a population of 33,346.

The parish includes part of the ancient woodland of Epping Forest. Loughton has three conservation areas and 56 listed buildings, together with a further 50 that are locally listed.

The neighbouring parishes are Waltham Abbey, Theydon Bois, Chigwell, and Buckhurst Hill. The parish also borders the London Borough of Waltham Forest near Chingford.

== History ==
There is evidence of prehistoric settlement in the area. Loughton Camp is a Mesolithic fort in Epping Forest to the north-west of the town, which was rediscovered in 1872.

The name Loughton is Old English and means the farm or settlement of someone called Luhha.

In Saxon times, Loughton was a vill. By the 1060s the vill was subdivided into six estates or manors. In 1060, two of the six Loughton manors were given to the monastery of Waltham Abbey by Harold Godwinson, along with the neighbouring manors of Debden and Alderton. The grant of these manors to the abbey was subsequently confirmed in a charter from Edward the Confessor in 1062.

Following the Norman Conquest, the Domesday Book of 1086 records the six Loughton manors as Lochentuna. Two of the Loughton manors were still owned by Waltham Abbey, as were Alderton (listed as Aluertuna) and Debden (listed as Tippedana). The medieval Alderton Hall survives on Alderton Hall Lane.

The six manors of Loughton plus the manors of Alderton and Debden became the parish of Loughton. Loughton's medieval parish church, dedicated to St Nicholas, stood beside Loughton Hall on Rectory Lane.

The manor of Loughton Hall was owned by Mary Tudor from shortly before she became queen in 1553. The manor was later owned by the Wroth family from 1578 to 1738. Sir Robert Wroth (c. 1576 – 1614) and his wife Lady Mary Wroth (1587 – c. 1652) entertained many of the great literary figures of the time, including Ben Jonson, at the house.

In the early 17th century a new road through the forest was built. The main road from London to Epping and beyond had previously taken a more circuitous route to the east of Loughton, running through Chigwell, Abridge and Theydon Bois. The new road provided a better route from London not just to Epping, but also to Cambridge and East Anglia. The road served as a stagecoach route, and Loughton developed into a more significant village along the new road. The road through the village was bypassed in 1834 when Epping New Road was built, following higher ground through the forest to the west of Loughton to avoid some of the steeper hills on the older route.

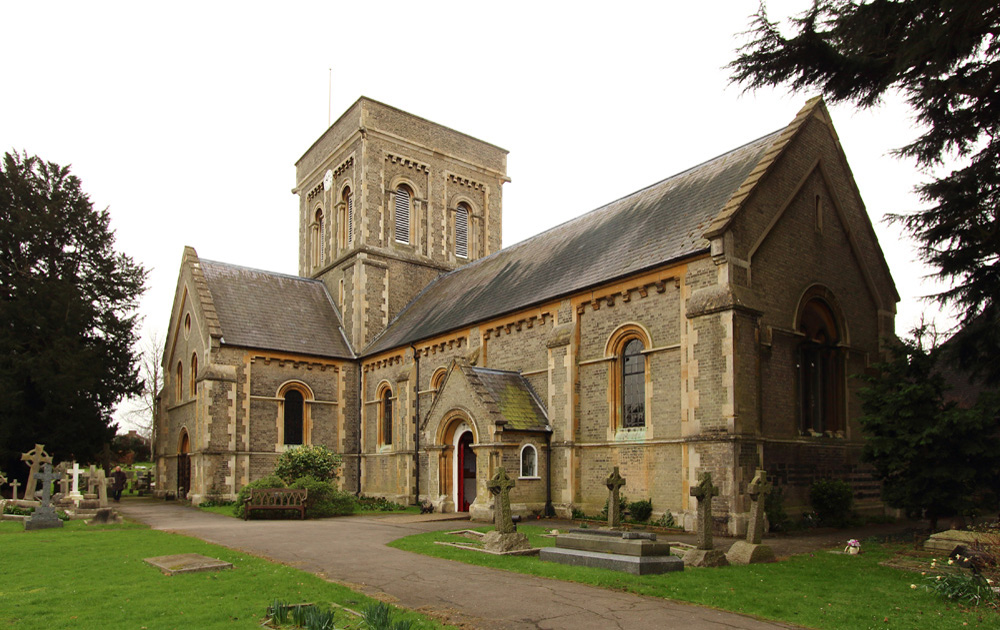
St John the Baptist's Church, built 1846

Loughton Hall burnt down in 1836. Following the loss of the manor house, and with the principal part of the village having grown up along the main road, the medieval St Nicholas' Church was left quite isolated from the population it served. A new parish church dedicated to St John the Baptist was therefore built in 1846, just off the main road through the village. St Nicholas' Church was demolished shortly afterwards, although a smaller chapel of ease also dedicated to St Nicholas was subsequently built within the churchyard of the medieval church in 1877. Loughton Hall was eventually rebuilt in 1878 by John Whitaker Maitland, whose family held the manor for much of the 19th century. It is now a care home and is a grade II listed building.

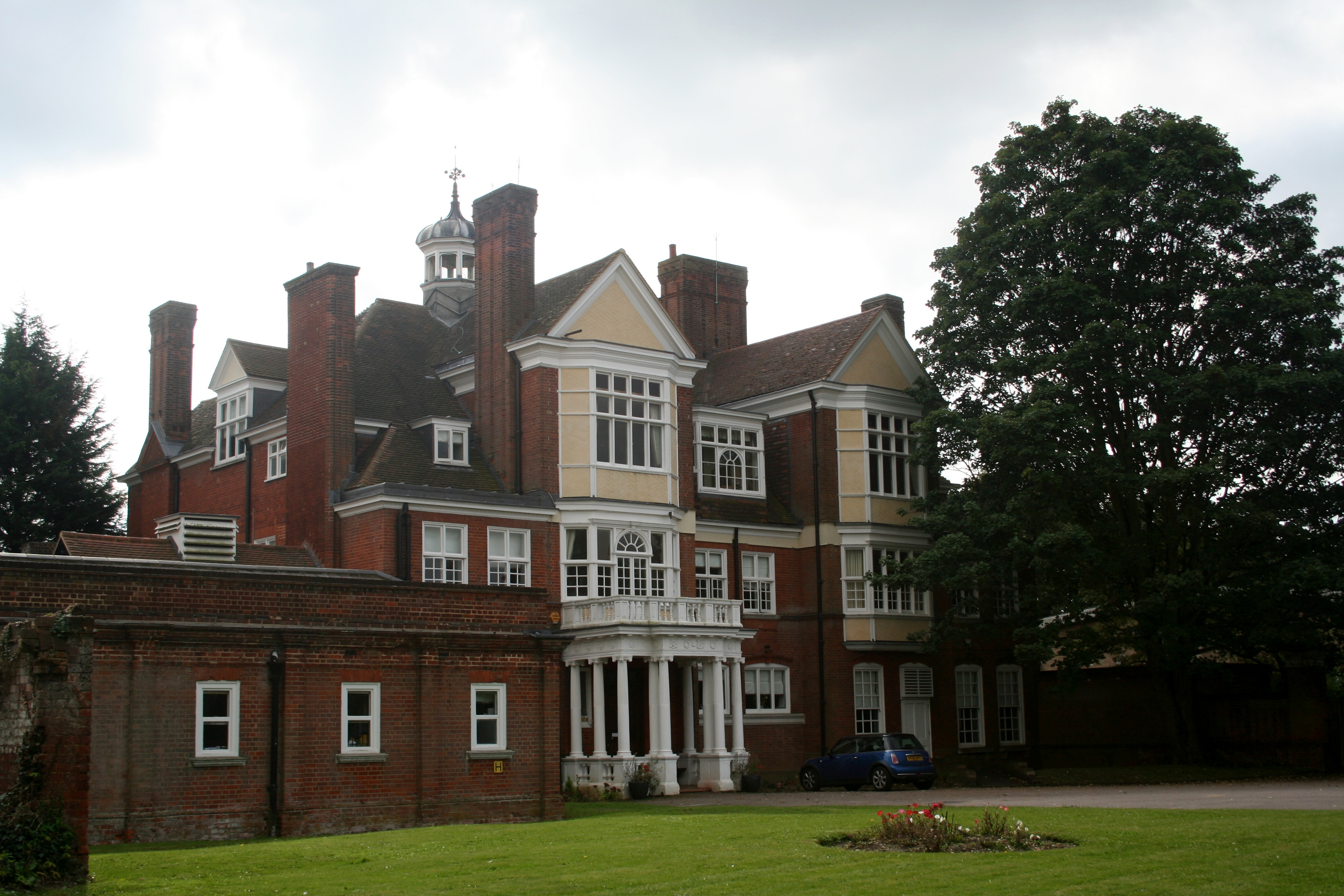
Loughton Hall, built 1878 on site of medieval manor house

Loughton railway station opened in 1856 at the end of a branch of the Eastern Counties Railway from London via Woodford. The Eastern Counties Railway became part of the Great Eastern Railway in 1862, and the line was extended to Epping and Ongar in 1865, which needed Loughton's station to be relocated onto the new through tracks, replacing the former terminus station. A second station in the parish was built as part of the 1865 extension; it was initially called Chigwell Road and then Chigwell Lane, being then the nearest station to Chigwell. It was renamed Debden in 1949. The railway through Loughton was transferred to London Underground as part of the New Works Programme of 1935–1940. After electrification works and the construction of a new link to the existing underground line near Stratford, the route became part of the Central line in 1948.

The arrival of the railway in the 1850s spurred on the town's development. Areas such as Baldwins Hill were developed on the edge of the forest. These new areas were popular with the middle classes, and a number of prominent artists and scientists moved to Loughton. Further enclosure and development of the forest was supported by landowners, notably John Whitaker Maitland, who was both lord of the manor of the Loughton Hall estate and a clergyman, being the rector of Loughton. Further development into the forest was opposed by many existing local residents concerned for the loss of their ancient lopping rights; Thomas Willingale, a labourer, was a prominent opponent of the landowners. These disputes culminated in the Epping Forest Act 1878 which gave statutory protection to the forest and passed responsibility for its management to the Corporation of London.

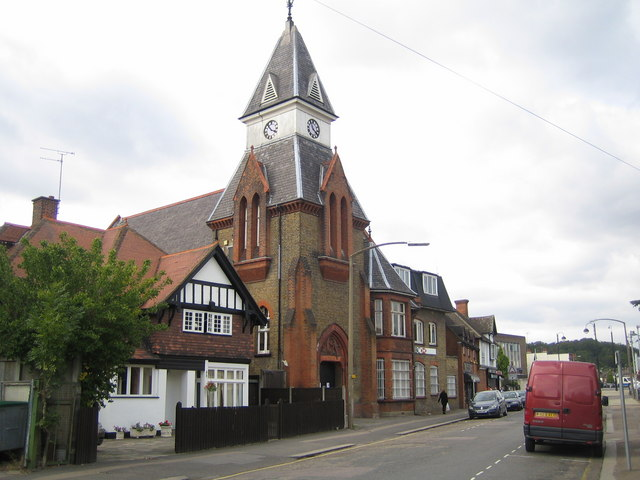
Lopping Hall, Station Road

The 1878 Act protected the forest from development, but also ended the rights of local residents to lop timber. In compensation for the loss of these rights, Lopping Hall was built as a public hall for the town by the Corporation of London, opening in 1884.

On the north-eastern side of Loughton the Debden estate was built from 1945 onwards as part of the policy of London overspill, which aimed both to reduce overcrowding in London and to replacing housing and industry in London which had been lost during the Second World War. Although Loughton was outside the administrative area of the County of London, the Debden estate was built by London County Council. The estate took its name from the ancient manor of Debden, which had been centred on Debden Green to the north of the new estate.

Located within Debden's industrial estate is the former printing works of the Bank of England; in 1993 the printing works were taken over by De La Rue on their winning the contract to print the banknotes. The headquarters of greeting card company Clinton Cards and construction firm Higgins Group are also located within the Debden Industrial Estate. In 2008, electronics firm Amshold announced their intention to move the group's headquarters to Loughton from Brentwood. They moved to a site in Langston Road; in 2012, their property company Amsprop converted a headquarters building next to the Town Council offices in Rectory Lane.

In 2002, Loughton featured in the ITV1 programme Essex Wives, a documentary series about the lives of some of the nouveau riche who have resided in the Essex satellite towns of London since the 1980s. The series propelled Jodie Marsh, one of its featured characters, to fame. Journalists' use of the term "golden triangle" to describe the towns of Loughton, Buckhurst Hill and Chigwell for their propensity to attract wealthy footballers, soap-opera actors and TV celebrities as residents derives from this. The town has been used as a backdrop in other television series, notably The Only Way is Essex, and two shops in the High Road are associated with members of its cast.

== Geography ==
Loughton is bounded by Epping Forest to the west and the Roding river valley to the east. After the Epping Forest Act 1878 prohibited any further expansion of the town into the forest, the forest and the river have formed two natural barriers constraining any expansion westwards or eastwards, and consequently most of the growth in the last 100 years has been through infilling and construction of new housing estates to the north and south of the old town centre, plus the purpose-built suburb of Debden to the north-east. The Roding valley is somewhat marshy and the river is prone to flooding, so construction close to the river is very limited and the majority of the land around it has been designated as a nature reserve or left as open space parkland. The M11 motorway that follows the course of the Roding along this section of its length is built on raised banks or flyovers, to avoid potential problems with flooding.

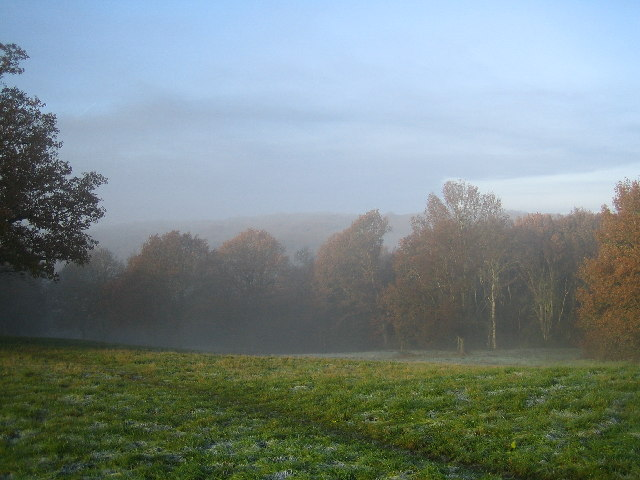
View of Epping Forest from Baldwins Hill

The highest parts of the town are the roads that border the forest's edge; from the green outside the Gardeners Arms pub near the junction of York Hill, Pump Hill and Baldwins Hill there are views of London, south-west Essex, Kent and Surrey. From here, on a clear day, there is a panoramic view of London landmarks and the North Downs beyond. There are numerous other fine views from different parts of the town, including one roughly at the junction of Traps Hill, Borders Lane, Alderton Hill and Spareleaze Hill, and another on Spring Grove and Hillcrest Road. In the valley between these two hills flows Loughton Brook, which rises in Epping Forest near Waltham Abbey and flows through the forest and Baldwins and Staples Ponds before traversing the town and emptying into the Roding.

There are several distinctive neighbourhoods in Loughton mostly identifiable by the building types incorporated during their development:

- Old Loughton refers to the original settlement which grew up around Loughton High Road.
- Debden occupies about 650 acres/225 hectares to the north east of Loughton; London County Council built the woodland development between 1947 and 1952 out of county to rehouse people from London whose homes had been destroyed or damaged during the Second World War. The largest open space in Debden is Jessel Green, an open hillside towards its centre, deliberately planned as a central open resource by the LCC.
- Debden Green is a hamlet set around an ancient green in the north-east corner of the parish. Debden House in Debden Green is an adult learning and conference centre run by the London Borough of Newham; the grounds include a campsite.
- Goldings Manor is a modern estate of mostly large detached houses built in the grounds of 'Goldings Manor', a large mansion demolished after being hit during the Blitz. It comprises four residential streets; Broadstrood, Campions, Garden Way and Stanmore Way.
- Great Woodcote Park is a modern housing estate at the southern end of Loughton, built on the site of the former North Farm.
- Little Cornwall is a hilly area of north-west Loughton closest to Epping Forest characterised by steep hills, weatherboarded houses, narrow lanes and high holly hedges.
- Roding Estate or South Loughton is the area south-east of the London Underground Central line and was mostly built up between the First World War and Second World War.

== Demographics ==
At the 2021 census, the parish had a population of 33,346. The built up area population figures published by the Office for National Statistics are rounded to the nearest five people, and the built up area of Loughton was reported to have a population of 33,345, in essence matching the population of the parish. The population had been 31,106 in 2011.

The 2021 census showed that 73.5% of the town's population identified as White British. In 2016, Loughton was assessed by the Policy Exchange as the third best ethnically integrated town in the country.

Ethnic Group	1991		2001		2011		2021	
Ethnic Group	Number	%	Number	%	Number	%	Number	%
White: Total	27,617	97.5%	28,867	95.1%	28,232	90.8%	28,116	84.3%
White: English/Welsh/Scottish/Northern Irish/British	–	–	27,631	91.1%	26,342	84.7%	24,517	73.5%
White: Irish	–	–	381	1.3%	367	1.2%	423	1.3%
White: Gypsy or Irish Traveller	–	–	–	–	22	0.1%	16	0%
White: Romani	–	–	–	–	–	–	38	0.1%
White: Other	–	–	855	2.8%	1,501	4.8%	3,122	9.4%
Asian: Total	516	1.8%	866	2.9%	1,342	4.3%	2,236	6.7%
Asian or Asian British: Indian	319	1.1%	506	1.7%	665	2.1%	1,064	3.2%
Asian or Asian British: Pakistani	31	0.1%	106	0.3%	203	0.7%	383	1.1%
Asian or Asian British: Bangladeshi	6	0%	45	0.1%	59	0.2%	141	0.4%
Asian or Asian British: Chinese	92	0.3%	124	0.4%	161	0.5%	256	0.8%
Asian or Asian British: Other Asian	68	0.2%	85	0.3%	254	0.8%	392	1.2%
Black: Total	109	0.4%	209	0.7%	589	1.9%	942	2.8%
Black or Black British: African	30	0.1%	97	0.3%	338	1.1%	486	1.5%
Black or Black British: Caribbean	46	0.2%	105	0.3%	177	0.6%	331	1%
Black or Black British: Other Black	33	0.1%	7	0%	74	0.2%	125	0.4%
Mixed: Total	–	–	317	1%	743	2.4%	1,352	4.1%
Mixed: White and Black Caribbean	–	–	116	0.4%	257	0.8%	404	1.2%
Mixed: White and Black African	–	–	14	0%	83	0.3%	172	0.5%
Mixed: White and Asian	–	–	112	0.4%	226	0.7%	418	1.3%
Mixed: Other Mixed	–	–	75	0.2%	177	0.6%	358	1.1%
Other: Total	76	0.3%	81	0.3%	200	0.6%	707	2.1%
Other: Arab	–	–	–	–	33	0.1%	102	0.3%
Other: Any other ethnic group	76	0%	81	0.3%	167	0.5%	605	1.8%
Total	28,318	100.0%	30,340	100.0%	31,106	100.0%	33,353	100.0%

== Governance ==
There are three tiers of local government covering Loughton, at parish (town), district, and county level: Loughton Town Council, Epping Forest District Council, and Essex County Council. The town council is based at 1 Buckingham Court on Rectory Lane.

For national elections, Loughton forms part of the Epping Forest constituency.

=== Administrative history ===
Loughton was an ancient parish in the Ongar hundred of Essex. When elected parish and district councils were established under the Local Government Act 1894, Loughton was given a parish council and included in the Epping Rural District. In 1900, the parish was removed from the rural district and made a separate urban district. The urban district council was based at Lopping Hall.

Loughton Urban District was abolished in 1933, when the area was merged with the neighbouring Buckhurst Hill Urban District and the parish of Chigwell to form the Chigwell Urban District. Loughton continued to form a civil parish after the 1933 reforms, but as an urban parish it was ineligible to have a parish council; the lowest elected tier of local government between 1933 and 1974 was Chigwell Urban District Council. Despite the name of the district, the council based itself in Loughton, building offices in the 1930s on Old Station Road.

Chigwell Urban District was abolished in 1974 when the area became part of the new Epping Forest District. The area of the former Chigwell Urban District became unparished as a result of the 1974 reforms. In 1996, three new civil parishes were created covering the area of the pre-1974 Chigwell Urban District: Buckhurst Hill, Chigwell, and Loughton. On its creation, the new parish council for Loughton adopted the name Loughton Town Council.

=== Public services ===
Between 1839 and 31 March 2000, policing and crime prevention was provided by the Metropolitan Police. From 1 April 2000, responsibilities were transferred to the Essex Police following the creation of the Greater London Authority.

Loughton has a fire station operated by the Essex County Fire and Rescue Service.

== Culture and the arts ==
=== Drama ===
Loughton is home to the East 15 Acting School. East 15 grew from the work of Joan Littlewood's famed Theatre Workshop. Joan Littlewood's Theatre Workshop was based in Stratford, London, whose postal district is E15. The School, which became part of the University of Essex in 2000, includes the Corbett Theatre in its campus. Regular productions are staged at the theatre, which was named after Harry H. Corbett (1925–1982), himself a Theatre Workshop member and benefactor of East 15. The theatre building is actually a converted medieval flint barn from Ditchling, Sussex which was dismantled and rebuilt in Loughton.

The character actor Jack Watling (1923–2001) lived in Alderton Hall, Loughton. His son, Giles (born 1953), also an actor, was born there. Actor and playwright Ken Campbell (1941–2008), nicknamed 'The Elf of Epping Forest', lived in Baldwins Hill, Loughton, where a blue plaque to him was erected in 2013. Comedy-drama actor Alan Davies (born 1966) grew up in Loughton, and attended Staples Road school. Actress Jane Carr (born 1950), best known for her role as "Louise Mercer" in the American version of the sitcom Dear John from 1988 to 1992, was born in Loughton.

Amateur drama is performed mainly at Lopping Hall. Performances are from Loughton Amateur Dramatic Society, founded in 1924, which until 2006 alternated with those from the now-defunct West Essex Repertory Company, founded in 1945. Lopping Hall opened in 1884 and was paid for by the Corporation of London to compensate villagers for the loss of traditional rights to lop wood in Epping Forest, rights which were bought out when the management of the forest was taken over by the corporation in 1878. Lopping Hall served as Loughton's town hall and was the venue for most of the parish's social – and especially musical - activities during the early 20th century. There are ambitious plans by the Trustees for the building's restoration.

=== Music ===
Loughton's classical music scene dates back to the late 19th century, when there were regular concerts by the Loughton Choral Society in Lopping Hall under the conductorship of Henry Riding. Today, performances are mainly at two venues: Loughton Methodist Church hosts the annual Loughton Youth Music Festival, which showcases talented pupils from local schools and colleges. St. John's Church festival choir undertakes extensive overseas tours, and in turn hosts well-known soloists, chamber and operatic groups. The music hall artiste José Collins (1887–1958) lived at 107 High Road. The hymn writer Sarah Flower Adams (1805–1848) lived with her husband William Bridges Adams (1797–1872) at a house called 'Sunnybank', demolished in 1888 and replaced by No. 9 Woodbury Hill.

Loughton boasts a few rock and pop music connections; Mark Knopfler of Dire Straits was a lecturer at Loughton College (now Epping Forest College). The Wake Arms public house (now demolished), which was about 50 yards (46 m) north of the Loughton boundary in Waltham Abbey on a roundabout, was a rock music venue from 1968 to 1973, hosting bands such as Black Sabbath, Deep Purple, Genesis, The Pretty Things, Status Quo, Uriah Heep, and Van der Graaf Generator. Ray Dorset, the lead singer of Mungo Jerry, had his first taste of fame when his band 'The Tramps' won the Loughton Beat Contest in 1964.

Roding Players is an amateur orchestra which rehearses at Roding Valley High School and gives three concerts a year in the Epping Forest area; composer Miles Harwood is Musical Director. Epping Forest Brass Band, founded in 1935, also has regular concerts in the Epping Forest area, and competes in national competitions and exhibitions. Loughton Cinema had a resident ladies' band during the 1930s.

Loughton also has its own music academy, the 'Loughton Music Academy' founded in 2001. Performances are with full orchestral participation.

Loughton Folk Club was founded on 28 October 2010 and held its first Loughton Folk Day on 9 April 2011. The Club meets weekly at 8pm at Loughton Club, Station Road, Loughton.

=== Opera and dance ===
In the 1930s, Loughton was home to the Pollards Operas, outdoor operatic performances in the garden of a large house. These were directed by Iris Lemare (1902–1997) and produced by Geoffrey Dunn (1903–1981), a prominent impresario, actor and cinematographer, and included several first British performances of operas. Loughton Operatic Society, founded in 1894, is one of the oldest arts organisations in Essex, and still stages regular musicals and operas at Lopping Hall.

Epping Forest District Council's Arts Unit, Epping Forest Arts, stages occasional dance-based performance works in Loughton, with community and schools participation. Harlow Ballet, which stages full-scale amateur ballet productions at Harlow Playhouse, also recruits in the area.

=== Visual arts ===
The sculptor and painter Sir Jacob Epstein (1880–1959) lived at 'Deerhurst' between 1933 and 1950, after having rented no. 49 Baldwins Hill; he produced some of works there. Sculptor Elsa Fraenkel lived at Elm Lodge, Church Lane, after World War II. Artist John Strevens (1902–1990) lived at 8 Lower Park Road from 1963 until his death. Walter Spradbury (1889–1969), best known for his iconic interwar London Transport posters, lived nearby in Buckhurst Hill.

William Lakin Turner lived and painted at Clovelly, York Hill, Loughton, in the 1890s. From 1908 to 1936, William Brown Macdougall, artist, and his wife, the author and translator, Margaret Armour, lived in Loughton. Juggler Mark Robertson (1963–1992) lived at 'The Avenue' and appeared at the London Palladium and on television.

=== Cinema ===
Early cinematic shows took place in the Lopping Hall. A purpose-built Loughton Cinema was opened by actress Evelyn Laye on 9 October 1928; designed by local architect Theodore Legg, it could seat 847. This was later reduced to 700. In July 2010 Loughton Town Council organised a screening of An Education, the first film screening in Loughton since the closure of the cinema, and its success prompted the formation of the Loughton Film Society in September 2010 to redress the lack of a local cinema.

George Pearson (1875–1973), a director and film-writer in the early years of British cinematography, was headmaster of Staples Road Junior School, Loughton 1908–1913. Charles Ashton (1884 – c. 1968), film actor from the silent movie era, lived at 20 Carroll Hill, Loughton, from 1917–34.

Several films have been set in the Loughton area, including the 2001 TV movie Hot Money, based on real events at Loughton's Bank of England printing works.

=== Literature ===
Shakespeare's Midsummer Night's Dream was perhaps written for the marriage of Sir Thomas Heneage, Vice-Chamberlain of the Royal Household to the Countess of Southampton, who lived near Loughton at Copped Hall.

Lady Mary Wroth (1586–1652), niece of poet Sir Philip Sidney, lived at Loughton Hall with her husband Sir Robert Wroth, and they turned the mansion into a centre of Jacobean literary life. Ben Jonson was a frequent visitor, and dedicated his play The Alchemist to Mary and poetry collection The Forest to Sir Robert. Lady Mary was an author in her own right, and her book Urania is generally regarded as the first full-length English novel by a woman.

Anthony Trollope (1815–1882) who lived for some time at nearby Waltham Cross, set part of his novel Phineas Finn (1869), which parodies corrupt electoral procedures, in a fictitious Loughton. Robert Hunter, lexicographer and encyclopaedist (1823–1897) built a house in Loughton, and there compiled his massive Encyclopaedic dictionary. William Wymark Jacobs (1863–1943) lived at The Outlook, Upper Park Road before moving to Feltham House, Goldings Road. Best known as the author of the short story The Monkey's Paw. Jacobs also wrote sardonic short stories based in 'Claybury', a thinly veiled fictionalisation of Loughton. Rudyard Kipling (1865–1936) stayed as a child at Goldings Hill Farm.

Arthur Morrison (1863–1945), best known for his grim novels about London's East End, lived in Salcombe House, Loughton High Road. Constance E. H. Inskip (1905–1945) an Evening News journalist who also wrote three novels amongst other translation work, lived in the town until her death at the birth of her daughter. Both were buried at nearby High Beach. Hesba Stretton (1832–1911) was a children's author who lived in Loughton. Hesba Stretton was the pen name of Sarah Smith; her novels about the street children of Victorian London raised awareness of their plight. Horace Newte lived at Alderton Hall and the Chestnuts: he was a prolific novelist. Another children's writer, Winifred Darch (1884–1960), taught at Loughton County High School for Girls 1906–1935 (now Roding Valley High School), as did the hymnodist and poet, Emily Chisholm (1910–1991), who lived in Loughton at 3 Lower Park Rd.

Ruth Rendell, Baroness Rendell of Babergh (1930–2015), who lived in Shelley Grove, Loughton, was educated at Loughton County High School for Girls and subsequently worked as a journalist in Loughton at the West Essex Gazette. Some of her fiction is set in Epping Forest, and 'Little Cornwall', the hilly area of north-west Loughton close to Epping Forest, takes its name from her description in the novel The Face of Trespass. Much of her 2014 novel The Girl Next Door is set in the Loughton of 1944 and 2013. There is a blue plaque on one of her former homes, 45 Millsmead Way.

Poets associated with Loughton include Sarah Flower Adams (1805–1848), and Sarah Catherine Martin (c. 1766–1826), author of the nursery rhyme "Old Mother Hubbard", who is buried in the churchyard of St. Nicholas Church, Loughton. William Sotheby (1757–1833), poet and classicist, lived at Fairmead, Loughton. Alfred, Lord Tennyson (1809–1892) lived at Beech Hill House, High Beach 1837–1840 where he wrote parts of his magnum opus "In Memoriam". John Clare (1793–1864) lived at a private asylum at High Beach 1837–1841. The First World War poet Edward Thomas (1878–1917) also lived at High Beach 1915–1917. The poet George Barker (1913–1991) was born at 116 Forest Road, Loughton. Geoffrey Ainger (1925–2013), who wrote the Christmas carols "Born in the Night", "Mary's Child", "Do Shepherds Stand" and several other hymns, was Methodist minister of Loughton 1958–63. Ralph Russell, foremost Western scholar of Urdu language and literature, lived in Queens Road as a child and attended Staples Road School.

T. E. Lawrence bought land at Pole Hill in Chingford after the First World War and constructed a hut and swimming pool there. After the Chingford Urban District council bought the land in 1930 and demolished his structures, he re-erected the hut in the grounds of The Warren in Loughton in 1931. The hut remains there, but in a state of disrepair.

=== Museum and archives ===
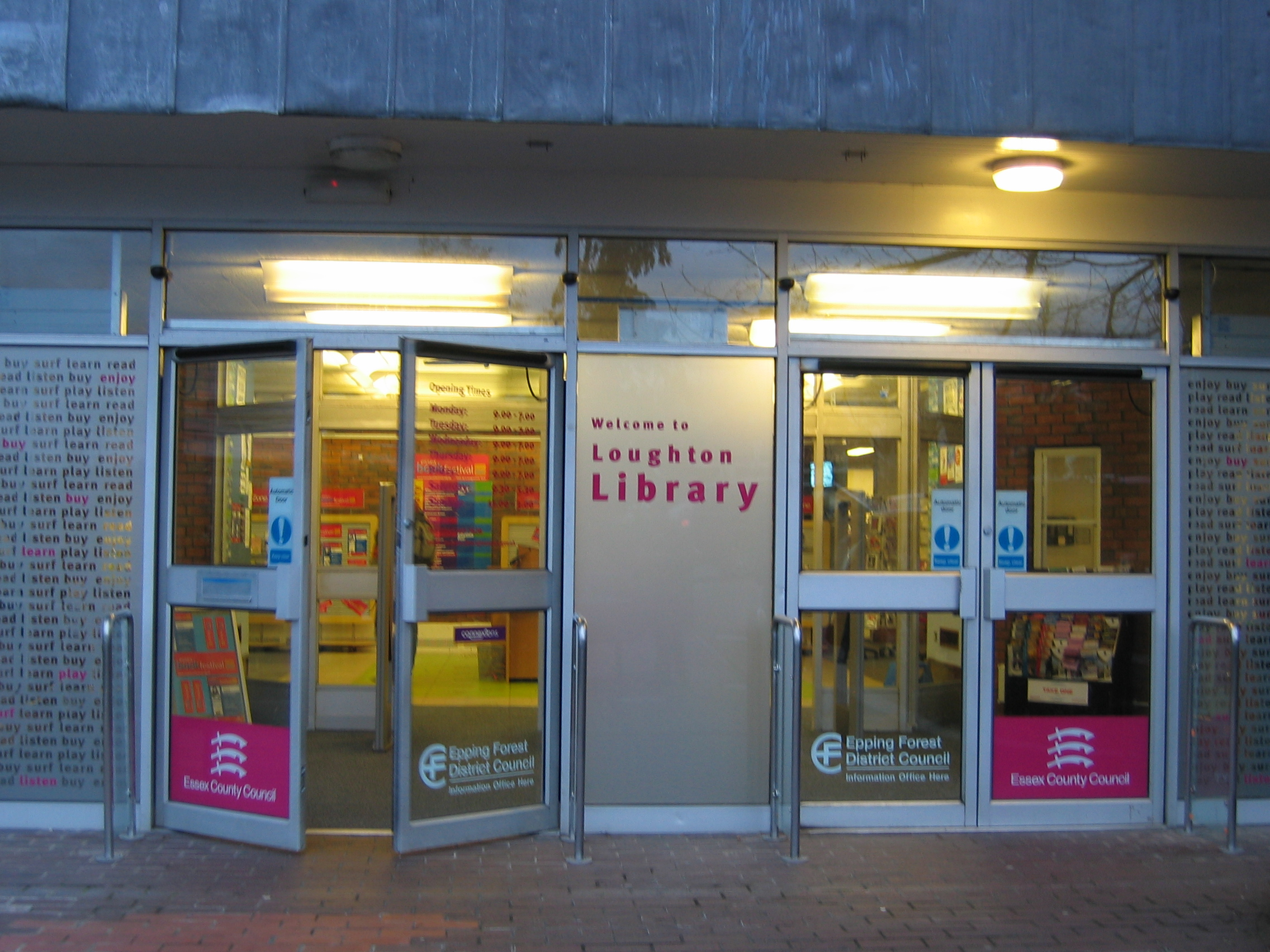
Loughton Library

Loughton is home to two national archives:

- The British Postal Museum Store, in Lenthall Road, houses objects ranging from the desk of Rowland Hill (founder of the Penny Post), to mobile post office vehicles and an astounding range of post boxes.
- The National Jazz Archive is housed in Loughton Library and Town Hall; it is the national repository and research centre for printed material, photographs and memorabilia relating to jazz, with an emphasis on British jazz. Founded by jazz trumpeter Digby Fairweather in 1988, it includes a collection of British jazz recordings, photographs, posters and memorabilia. The archive holds regular celebrity and live jazz events.

Funding was pledged in 2006 to help establish a Street Museum in Loughton. There is also an Epping Forest District Museum store in the town, but this is not open to the public.

A number of Loughton buildings, including the Masonic Hall, Lopping Hall, Mortuary Chapel and several churches, were opened for Heritage Open Days in September 2007, the first time this had been done.

== Sport and leisure ==
A number of sports personalities live in the town, including cricketers James Foster and Ryan ten Doeschate.

Loughton Leisure Centre at Traps Hill, managed by a private operator on behalf of the Epping Forest District Council, includes a swimming pool complex and fitness facilities. Other large commercial sports and leisure facilities are also to be found in the area.

- Athletics – Members of the Loughton Athletic Club, based at the Pavilion in Southview Road and affiliated to the Essex AAA, compete in a variety of regional track and field competitions, including the Women's Southern League and the Men's Southern League.
- Bowls – Loughton Bowls Club has its ground at Eleven Acre Rise.
- Boxing – Dennis & Dyer Boxing Academy, opened in 2020, is located off of Debden Broadway with British Boxing Board of Control certified coaches, teaching boxing at amateur and professional level.
- Cricket – Loughton Cricket Club was founded in 1879, and plays in the Shepherd Neame Essex League. Its cricket ground, complete with thatched pavilion, and facing the war memorial, originated as a field named Mott's Piece. One of the earliest presidents of the Loughton Cricket Club was Julius Rohrweger, a local German extraction who owned Uplands, a large house adjacent to the cricket ground. As he was politically a Liberal, the local Conservative party created and supported for some time a rival team, the Loughton Park Cricket Club, though this no longer exists. The South Loughton Cricket Club was founded in 1938 and plays at the Roding Road Cricket Ground.
- Fencing – Loughton Fencing Club meets at Debden Park High School.
- Football – At Willingale Road Playing Fields and at the Roding Valley Recreation Ground a variety of local football teams play. Loughton Town FC & Coppice Row play their home games at the latter, in the Essex Sunday Combination & The Harlow and District League respectively. GFA Loughton FC, founded in 2014, has youth teams in the Echo Junior League as well as running Grassroots Football Academy, a Youth Football Academy at GGSK College, Roding Lane IG9.
- Loughton FC, founded in 1965, dropped out of the Hertfordshire Senior County League in 2007 and now plays in the Bishops Stortford, Stansted and District League and has youth teams in the Echo Junior League and the Barking Youth League. Ron Greenwood (1921–2006), manager of the England football team 1977–82, lived in Loughton for some years at 18 Brooklyn Avenue.
- Golf – Loughton Golf Club owns a 9-hole course in Clays Lane. There are many other golf courses close by, including Abridge Golf and Country Club, Chigwell Golf Club, Chingford Golf Club, Royal Epping Forest Golf Club, Theydon Bois Golf Club, West Essex Golf Club, Woodford Golf Club and Woolston Manor Golf Club.
- Orienteering and Rambling – Several long-distance footpaths pass through Loughton, including the Forest Way and the London Outer Orbital Path, and shorter walks are also popular, especially in Epping Forest. Chigwell & Epping Forest Orienteering Club was founded in 1966. West Essex Ramblers, founded in 1970, are the local rambling club for Loughton. The traditional Epping Forest Centenary Walk, an all-day event commemorating the saving of Epping Forest as a public space, takes place annually on the fourth Sunday in September.
- Speedway – The first event at High Beach near Loughton was staged on 19 February 1928.
- Swimming – Epping Forest District Swimming Club, founded in 1977, meets at Loughton Leisure Centre.
- Tennis – The Avenue Lawn Tennis Club has four artificial grass courts on its ground between The Avenue and Lower Park Road. From November 2006 to March 2007, the tennis courts were resurfaced with a new layer of astroturf and sand. There is a children's half-court with a basketball net. The courts surround the clubhouse which (among other things) contains a table tennis table and a pool table. The Town Council maintains tennis courts on the Roding Valley, but those which are part of the Loughton Bowls and Lawn Tennis Club are disused.
- Taekwondo – Loughton Taekwondo meets at Debden Park High School. The club ranked top 5 at the BTCB National Taekwondo Championships in 2010 with 4 athletes becoming British Champion. The instructor Chan Sau won England's first ever gold medal at the 2008 Commonwealth Games in Canada.
- Karate – The Loughton Karate Club meets at The Lopping Hall or the Loughton Club Tuesdays, Fridays and Sundays

== Transport ==
=== Railway ===
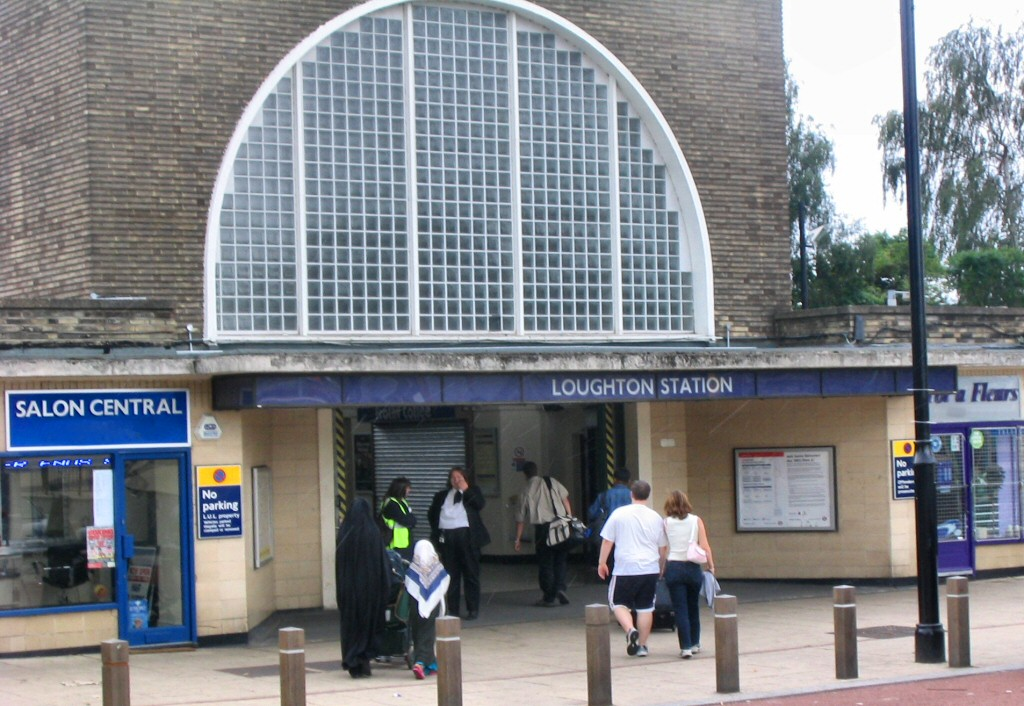
Loughton underground station

The town is served by both Loughton tube station and, further north-east, Debden tube station on the Central line of the London Underground. The line provides access to locations in the City, east and west London.

The current Loughton station was opened in 1940, but both the line and stations existed before that. The railway line dates back to 22 August 1856, when the branch from Stratford was opened by the Eastern Counties Railway. Debden station was named Chigwell Lane from 1865 until 1949 (although it was Chigwell Road for a few months in 1865). The route transferred to the Central line in 1949.

=== Buses ===
Bus routes serving Loughton are London Buses services, operated primarily by Stagecoach London. Services link the town with Buckhurst Hill, Chingford, Debden, Ilford, Walthamstow and Woodford. Other services include Route 66 operated by Arriva to Waltham Cross and various Central Connect services.

=== Roads ===
The M11 motorway, which links Cambridge to London, is accessed on Loughton's eastern boundary at junction 5 (south). The junction does not permit entry to northbound carriageway or exit southbound. The M11 was constructed in a number of phases beginning in the 1970s and finally opened in the 1980s.

== Education ==
In 2006, schools in Loughton had approximately 2330 places in post-16 education, approximately 1200 places in Key Stage 4, approx. 1700 places in Key Stage 3, approximately 1500 places in Key Stage 2 and approximately 600 places in Key Stage 1 - almost all of which were in comprehensive schools. Davenant Foundation has always had a sixth form; the other two secondary schools opened sixth forms in September 2015 and 2017

=== Primary schools ===
- Alderton Infant and Junior Schools
- Hereward Primary School
- Staples Road Primary School (an amalgamation of Staples Road Infant and Junior Schools in 2011)
- Thomas Willingale School
- White Bridge Primary School (an amalgamation of White Bridge Infant and Junior Schools in 2014/2015)
- St John Fisher Catholic Primary School

=== Secondary schools ===
- Davenant Foundation School
- Debden Park High School
- Roding Valley High School

=== Faith schools ===
- St. John Fisher Catholic Primary School – a voluntary aided school, whose Board consisting of appointees from the Catholic Church controls the admission policy whilst the Essex Local Education Authority provides its funding.
- Davenant Foundation School - founded in Whitechapel in 1680, and moved to Loughton in 1965–66. Despite its title, it is a voluntary aided school; the school is an ecumenical Christian school for 11- to 18-year-olds, which operates its own admissions policy based on parental attendance at any mainstream Christian church. In deference to its origins in a part of east London with a large Jewish population, Jewish children are also eligible.

=== Special schools ===
- Oak View School
- Woodcroft School

=== Independent schools ===
- Oaklands School (age 2½–11)

=== Colleges ===
- Debden House – residential adult education college
- East 15 Acting School – part of the University of Essex
- Epping Forest College – further education college
- LMAT – music academy

== Notable people ==
Notable people associated with Loughton (apart from those listed above) include:

- Thomas Willingale (1799–1870) — whose name is associated with the campaign that resulted in the preservation of Epping Forest. A plaque commemorating him is to be found in the wall of St John's Church at Church Lane.
- James Cubitt (1836–1914) — architect, best known for his design of nonconformist chapels such as the Union Chapel, Islington and the Welsh Church in Charing Cross Road in London, lived from c. 1880 onwards at Brook Villas and Cotsall Eaton Villas on the High Road, and spent the last years of his life at Monghyr Cottage in Traps Hill.
- Everard Calthrop (1857–1927) — railway engineer and parachute pioneer, lived at 'Goldings' from the early 1900s onwards.
- Sir Leonard Erskine Hill (1866–1952) — physiologist
- Vaughan and Rosalind Nash — biographer of Florence Nightingale
- Dr Millais Culpin (1874–1953) — surgeon and pioneer of psychiatry, lived at 'Slyder's Gate' and then 'The Meads', both in Church Hill, from 1913 onwards – a fictionalised version of the romance between him and his future wife Ethel, a nurse at the Royal London Hospital, Whitechapel where they both worked, was dramatised in the BBC TV series Casualty 1907 in 2008 and Casualty 1909 in 2009.
- Sir Frank Baines (1877–1933) — former Principal Architect of the government's Office of Works and chiefly known for designing Thames House and Imperial Chemical House in London, lived at 'Hillside' and built other large houses in Loughton.
- Major Greenwood (1880–1949) — epidemiologist and statistician - Sir Leonard Hill gave him his first job after graduation as an assistant physiologist before he turned to his later career, and he later became a neighbour of the Hill family in Loughton
- Sidney Godley (1889–1957) — first private soldier awarded the Victoria Cross during the Great War, is buried in Loughton Cemetery.
- Sir Hugh Cairns (1896–1952) — neurosurgeon and advocate of the crash helmet, lived at Loughton whilst working at the London Hospital.
- Sir Austin "Tony" Bradford Hill (1897–1991) — epidemiologist and statistician, and son of Sir Leonard Erskine Hill, grew up in the family home at Osborne House and published several research collaborations with Major Greenwood, a family friend.
- Captain Richard Been Stannard (1902-1977) — recipient of the first Royal Naval Reserve Victoria Cross of the Second World War, once lived on The Avenue.
- Sir William Addison (1905–1992) — historian and author, owned a bookshop in Loughton High Road for forty years.
- Commander Rupert Brabner (1911–1945) —Conservative MP for Hythe 1939–1945 and WWII pilot with the Royal Navy, was born in Loughton
- James Edgar "Johnnie" Johnson (1915–2001) — RAF fighter ace
- Len Murray (1922–2004) — later Baron Murray of Epping Forest, leader of the Trades Union Congress 1973–1984, lived for over 50 years in The Crescent and played an active role in town life. He is commemorated by the Murray Hall, opened 2007.
- Ron Moulton (1924-2010) — author and editor
- Matt Johnson (born 1961) — frontman of the band the The, spent part of his childhood in "The Crown" pub, run by his parents Eddie and Shirley in the 1970s and 1980s.
- Alan Davies (born 1966) — comedian, actor and broadcaster
- Joanna Forest (born 1977) — classical soprano
- Richard Hounslow (born 1981) — canoeing silver medallist at the 2012 Summer Olympics
- Gary Hooper (born 1988) — Glasgow Celtic footballer
- Diana Kennedy (1923–2022) - food writer. In August 2024, Loughton Town Council installed a commemorative blue plaque at her former home, 19 York Hill, Loughton.
- 1UP (born 1988) - DJ and Music Producer, attended Roding Valley High School.

== See also ==
- Loughton incinerator thefts – employees stole banknotes intended for destruction
