= Buckhurst Hill Urban District =

Former local government area in the UK

Buckhurst Hill
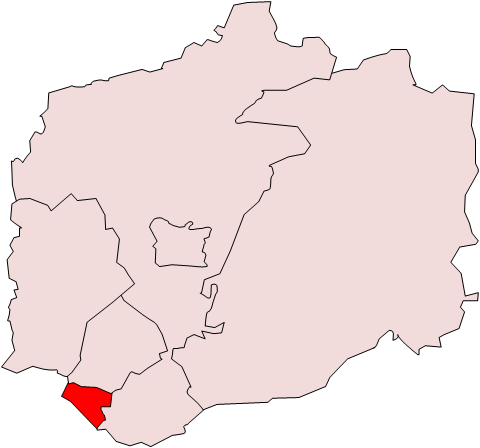
- The district in 1911
- Area
  - 1894-1933: 873 acres (3.53 km^{2})
- Population
  - 1911: 4,886
  - 1921: 5,008
  - 1931: 5,486
- Density
  - 1911: 5.6/acre
  - 1921: 5.7/acre
  - 1931: 6.3/acre
- History
  - Created: 1894
  - Abolished: 1933
  - Succeeded by: Chigwell Urban District
- Status: Urban district
  - HQ: Buckhurst Hill

Buckhurst Hill was a local government district in south west Essex, England, from 1894 to 1933. It contained the town and Civil Parish of Buckhurst Hill and was bordered by Loughton Urban District, Chingford Urban District and Wanstead and Woodford Urban District.
