= John Maitland (Chippenham MP) =

English politician

John Maitland (c. 1754 – 1831), was an English politician. He served as the Member of Parliament (MP) for Chippenham from 1806 to 1812 and 1817 to 1818.

He was the son of Robert Maitland and his wife Ursula Gorham. His younger brother was Ebenezer Maitland, and his son Ebenezer Maitland was a wealthy landowner.

In 1801, he bought Woodford Hall, a large house in Woodford, Essex, with 50 acres of land adjacent to Epping Forest. In 1777, it had been leased to John Goddard, a Rotterdam merchant, whose widow died there in 1814, after which Maitland moved in, dying there in 1831.

In 1825, Miss Anne Whitaker, the owner of Loughton Hall and its manor died, and Maitland inherited. In 1745, the Earl of Rochford had sold the manor to William Whitaker of Lime Street, who was an alderman of the City of London. After his death in 1752, it passed to his widow Anne, and on her death in 1770 to their daughter Miss Anne Whitaker.

Maitland's large art collection, with works by 48 artists including Titian, Dürer, Rubens, Van Dyck and Rembrandt, was auctioned by Christie and Manson on 30 July 1831.

William Whitaker Maitland, his son, inherited Woodford Hall and leased it to William Cox, and in 1840, to William Morris, father of William Morris the textile designer, poet, and socialist activist, then aged 6.
