= Loughton Hall =

House in Loughton, Essex, England

Coordinates: 51.6485°N 0.0782°E

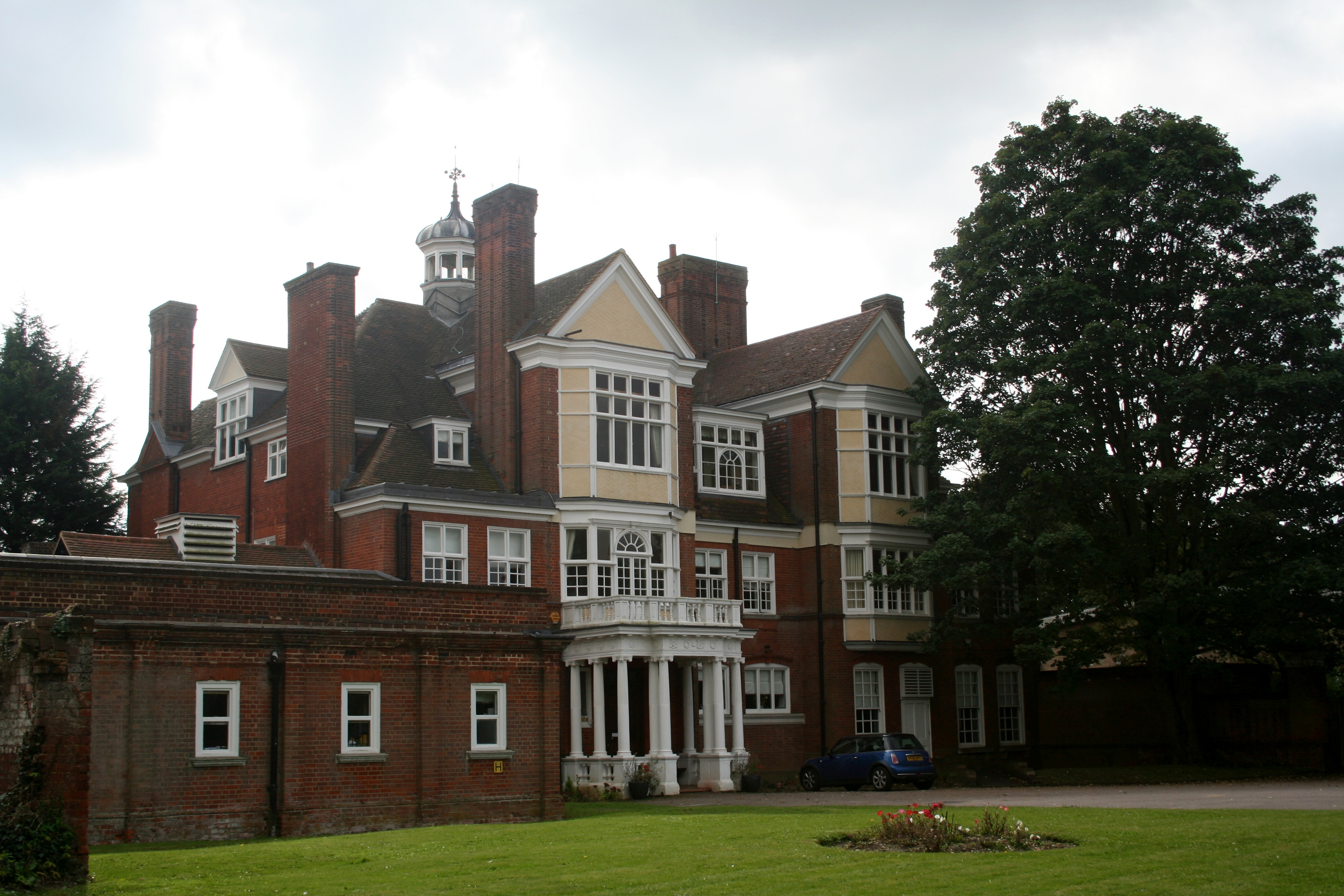
Loughton Hall in 2013

Loughton Hall is a large house in Rectory Lane, Loughton, Essex. The architect was William Eden Nesfield, and it is grade II listed with Historic England. It is now a 33-bedroom residential care home for elderly people.

== History ==
The original Loughton Hall was the property of the Abbots of Waltham Abbey before passing to Mary Tudor shortly before she became Queen in 1553. It later passed to the Wroth family, including the novelist Lady Mary Wroth, and regular visitors included Ben Jonson and Sir Philip Sidney. In 1745, it passed to the Whitaker family, and Miss Anne Whitaker left it to John Maitland, and then his son William Whitaker Maitland, who spent heavily on the building. It burnt down on 11 December 1836.

A new Hall was built in 1878, designed by William Eden Nesfield in a mock Jacobean style.

The last family member to live there was the Conservative politician Sir John Maitland, but it was requisitioned by the British Army during the Second World War to billet officers. It was sold to London County Council, and most of the land was used to build the Debden housing estate, with the Hall transferred to Essex County Council, and leased to Debden Community Association, and then given to Epping Forest College, but fell into disrepair by 2007. It is now a 33-bedroom residential care home for elderly people.
