= Loughton Urban District =

Former local government area in the UK

Loughton
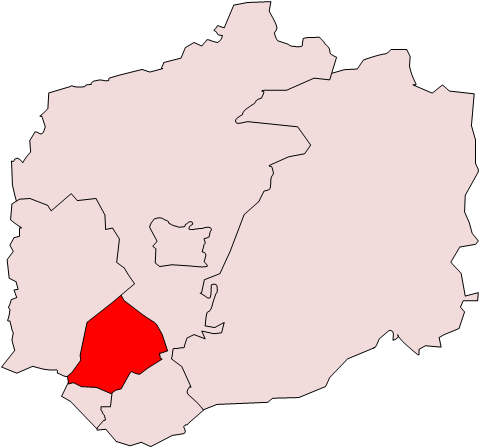
- The district in 1911
- Area
  - 1900-1933: 3,961 acres (16.03 km^{2})
- Population
  - 1901: 4,730
  - 1911: 5,433
  - 1921: 5,749
  - 1931: 7,390
- Density
  - 1901: 1.2/acre
  - 1911: 1.4/acre
  - 1921: 1.5/acre
  - 1931: 1.9/acre
- History
  - Created: 1900
  - Abolished: 1933
  - Succeeded by: Chigwell Urban District
- Status: Urban district
  - HQ: Loughton

Loughton was a local government district in south west Essex, England. It contained the town and Civil Parish of Loughton and was bordered by Buckhurst Hill Urban District, Chingford Urban District, Epping Rural District and Waltham Holy Cross Urban District.

== Demographics ==
In the 1931 census, out of those responding, social classes divided as following:

- 21% Professional, managerial and Technical occupations
- 53% Skilled Occupations
- 25% Partly skilled and unskilled occupations

Also, in 1931, 4% of the district were unemployed; 3334 were employed, while 119 were unemployed.

== External links and References ==
- Loughton UD - part of
- Vision of Britain.org
