= List of headmasters at Colchester Royal Grammar School =

This table lists the official (not de facto) appointment and end dates of the headmasters of Colchester Royal Grammar School, 1530 to present. Until the New Scheme of 1899, all headmasters had to be in holy orders; most were local clergy. (Res. signifies resigned.)

Tenure	How ended	Headmaster	Notes
Between First and Second Royal Charters (1534–1584)
Mentioned 1540		Robert Cock	
Mentioned 1553		Robert Wrennald	
Mentioned 1558		Richard Whittall	
Unknown - 14 April 1574	Res.	Thomas Lovell	
14 April 1574 - Unknown		William Barkely, Gent.	
1572–1577		Thomas Smeton	
Post-Second Royal Charter (1584 - 1899)
10 Jan 1583–1587		Edward Watson, M.A.	
March, 1587 - November, 1588	Res.	Samuel Harsnett, M.A.	Gives name to school house
12 November 1588 – 1598		Samuel Bentley, M.A.	
1598 - 1598		Theophilus Field	Only recognised in single source.
18 December 1598 – 22 April 1637	Died	William Kemp(e), M.A.	
20 May 1637 - 1637	Removed	Jonas Proost (Proast)	Approved by the Bishop of London on date given; Never appointed.
9 September 1637 – 17 January 1643	Res.	William Dugard, M.A.	Gives name to school house. Previously Headmaster of Stamford School.
30 June 1643 – 1647		Thomas Waterhouse, M.A.	
7 February 1648 – 24 June 1659	Res.	Nathaniel Seaman, M.A.	
24 June 1659 – 11 November 1662	Res.	John Ruting, M.A.	Born Jan Ruytinck.
11 November 1662 – 25 March 1664	Res.	Edward Burles, M.A.	
7 June 1664 – 17 July 1671	Res.	Lewis Griffin, M.A.	
17 July 1671 – 21 November 1684	Res.	James Cranston, M.A.	
21 November 1684 – 23 September 1695	Res	William Slinger, M.A.	
23 September 1695 - c. 1702		Richard Reynolds, M.A.	
1702–1723	Died	Thomas Allen, M.A., B.D.	
18 April 1723 – 24 January 1726	Died	William Turner, M.A.	Previously Headmaster of Stamford School.
15 March 1726 – 1727	Res.	David Comarque, M.A.	Family entirely French.
20 December 1727 – 25 December 1776	Died	Palmer Smythies, M.A.	
15 April 1777 – 1 January 1779	Res.	Samuel Parr, M.A.	Gives name to school house.
January, 1779 - April, 1806	Res.	Charles Hewitt, M.A.	
27 September 1806 - January, 1835	Died	Edward Crosse, M.A.	
23 March 1835 – 19 August 1839	Died	John Saunders, M.A	
3 January 1840 - April, 1851	Res.	John Dunningham, M.A.	
4 February 1852 – 20 October 1870	Died	William Wright, M.A., L.L.D., D.C.L.	
15 December 1870 – 12 April 1892	Res.	Charles Lawford Acland, M.A.	
April, 1892 - May, 1899	Res.	John Thomas, M.A.	Temporary Headmaster during the dispute over the introduction of a new scheme. Shaw Jeffrey did not recognise him as being a 'full' Headmaster.
1899–1900	Temp.	G. J. Yates, M.A.	Temporary Headmaster during the dispute over the introduction of a new scheme. Shaw Jeffrey did not recognise him as being a 'full' Headmaster and he continued under Shaw Jeffrey as 'Senior Master' until 1906.
Post-New Scheme (1899–present)
1 September 1900 - July, 1916	Res.	Percy Shaw Jeffrey, M.A.	First lay headmaster. Gives name to school house.
1 September 1916 - July, 1937	Res.	Harry James Cape, M.A., B.A., B.Sc.	
1 September 1937 - July, 1947		Arthur William Fletcher, M.A.	
1948–1968		Jack Elam, M.A.	
1968–1984	Res.	Stanley Gardner, M.A., B.Litt., D.Phil.	
1985–2000	Res.	Stewart Francis, M.A.	
2000–2015	Res.	Ken L. Jenkinson, M.A.	
2015–present	N/A	John Russell	

== Sources ==
- Martin, G. H. (March 1947). "The History of Colchester Royal Grammar School". The Colcestrian.
