= Harriet King =

Harriet King may refer to:

- Harriet King (diplomat), British High Commissioner to The Gambia since 2023
- Harriet King (fencer) (born 1935), American Olympic fencer
- Harriet King (poet) (1840–1920), English poet
