= St Mary's Church, Chigwell =

Church in Chigwell, Essex

Coordinates: 51.6245°N 0.0803°E

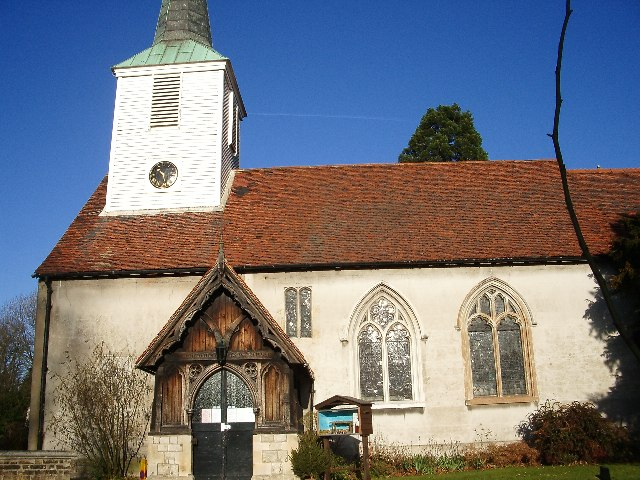

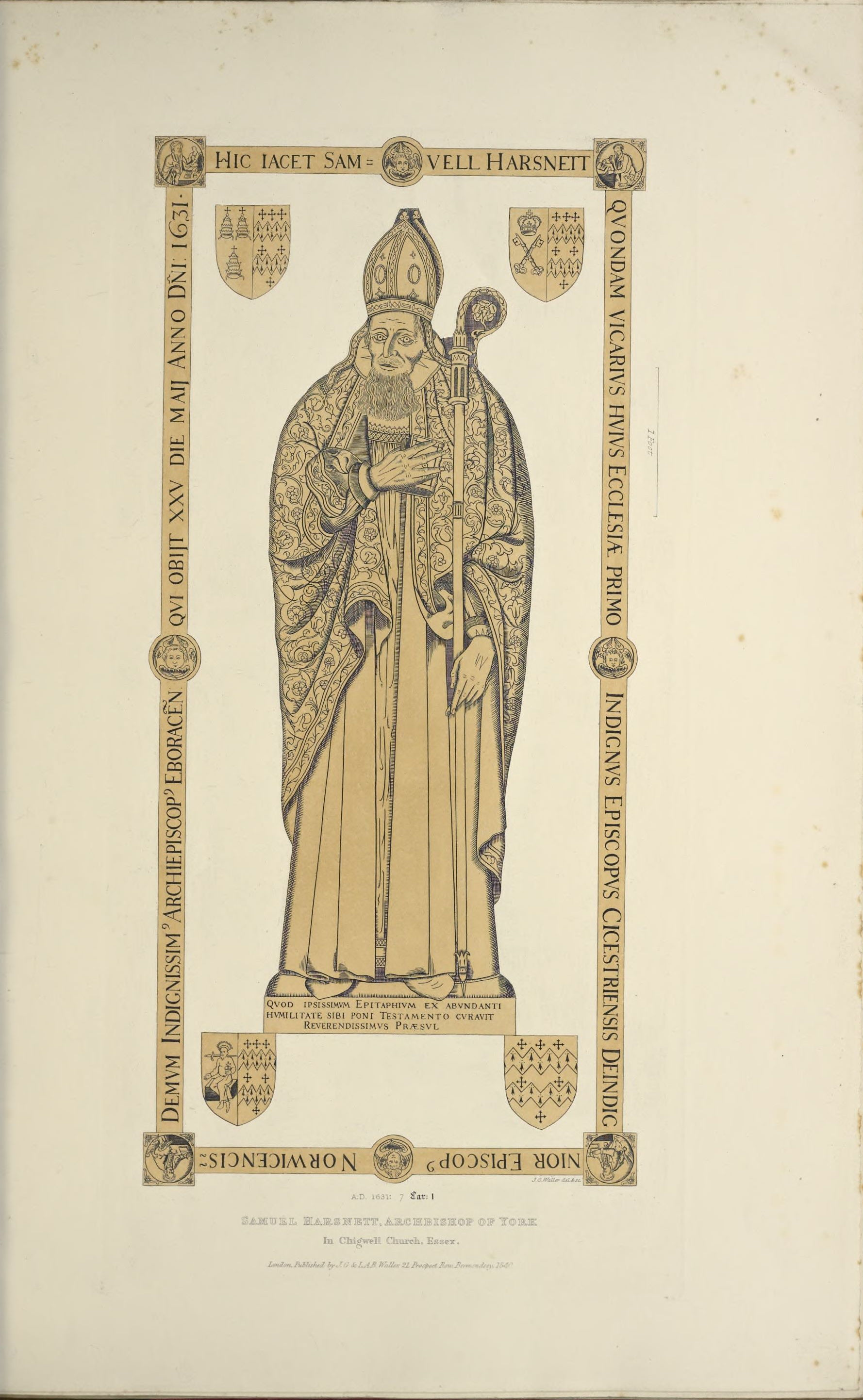
Monumental brass of Samuel Harsnett

St Mary's Church is a Grade II* listed Church of England church in Chigwell, Essex, England. Its parish was later united with that of All Saints Chigwell Row and then in 1994 with St Winifred's, which had been built in 1935 as a chapel of ease to St Mary's.

Samuel Harsnett, future Archbishop of York, was Vicar of Chigwell from 1597 to 1605, founded two schools there in 1619 and was buried in St Mary's in 1631. The church also contains a wall monument to the Tudor politician Thomas Colshill, whilst its churchyard contains the remains of Thomas Edwards, recipient of the Victoria Cross for actions at the Battle of Tamai in 1884.
