= William Dugard =

17th-century English printer

- Born: 9 January 1606; Bromsgrove, Worcestershire, Kingdom of England
- Died: 3 December 1662 (aged 56); London, England
- Other names: William Du Gard, William Du-Gard
- Known for: Schoolmaster and printer
- Spouse(s): Elizabeth Adams (pre-1634 – 1641), Lydia Parker (or Tyler) (1643 – pre-1662)

William Dugard, or Du Gard (9 January 1606 – 3 December 1662), was an English schoolmaster and printer. During the English Interregnum, he printed many important documents and propaganda, first in support of Charles I and later of Oliver Cromwell. He also proved a successful (if controversial) master at a number of schools, including the Merchant Taylor's School, Colchester Royal Grammar School and Stamford School, and wrote a number of non-fiction works.

== Early life and education ==
Dugard was born in Bromsgrove, Worcestershire, the son of Henry Dugard, a clergyman and schoolmaster, and his wife, Elizabeth Kimberley, on 9 January 1606. Until the age of 17, Dugard was instructed in classical learning at the King's School, Worcester as a King's Scholar. On 13 September 1622 he was inducted into Sidney Sussex College, Cambridge, as a pensioner, studying with his uncle Richard Dugard. In 1629 he received a Bachelor of Arts degree and got his Master of Arts four years later. In the intervening years, he was an usher at Oundle School, Northamptonshire.

== Early teaching career ==
Soon after receiving his MA, Dugard was appointed Master of Stamford School in Lincolnshire, where he caused a great deal of controversy by suing the corporate officers for various abuses, including misappropriation of school lands.

On 27 July 1637 Dugard was elected Master of the Free School at Colchester, now Colchester Royal Grammar School, and began his duties on 9 September that year. He resigned the care of the school in January 1643, citing "the ill treatment he received at the hands of a party in that town". He is attributed with the enlargement of the school from nine to sixty-nine boys. The school has had, since 1908, a school house which bears his name.

Dugard's wife, Elizabeth Adams, whom he had married before 1631, died about 1640, leaving two children. Their 3 Stamford-born children were Richard Dugard (1631-before 1634), Richard Dugard (1634; attended St John's College, Oxford in 1650) and Thomas Dugard (1635). Dugard married his second wife, Lydia Parker (widow Tyler, of Lombard Street), on 22 March 1641 at All Hallows Stayning in Lombard Street, London. The couple registered six baptisms in London (5 sons and a daughter): William Dugard (1643), John Dugard (1644), Joseph Dugard (1645–1652), Benjamin Dugard (1648), Philanax Dugard (1649) and Lydia Dugard (1650). On 10 May 1644, he was chosen to be the next headmaster of Merchant Taylors' School, London. According to Chambers, the "school flourished exceedingly under his influence and management".

== Later life and death ==
Having bought the presses of James Young and established a printing business, Dugard became an official printer to the Commonwealth and Oliver Cromwell, the Lord Protector. Cromwell was duly incensed when Dugard started to print copies of Defensio Regia pro Carolo primo, Claudius Salmasius' defence of Charles I, his bitter opponent in the civil war. Dugard's activities had been uncovered by a parliamentarian spy, Elizabeth Alkin. For showing, as was thought, too great an affection to the royalist cause, on 20 February 1650, he was deprived of his press and equipment, valued at £1000 (£157000 in today's money), and imprisoned in Newgate. His wife and six surviving children were turned out of doors.

Dugard was released from prison after only a month, perhaps in part due to the influence that Dugard's "intimate friend" John Milton had over the judge John Bradshaw, or that which Milton and another of Dugard's friends, Sir James Harrington, had over the Council of State. In April 1650, Dugard opened a private school on Peter's Hill, now in the City of London, but in September was restored to his former station as headmaster at the Merchant Taylor's School. There he remained until 1661, when he was dismissed for breaking orders issued by the school, about which he had been given prior warning. These probably related to the low pupil numbers, or for not declaring extracurricular activities such as becoming a member of the Stationers' Company in 1648, principally to edit textbooks. He appealed against his dismissal but to no avail.

Finding himself unemployed once more, Dugard opened a private school in Coleman street in July 1661 and by the next March had gathered 193 scholars, "so great was his reputation and the fame of his abilities". Dugard did not live to expand the school further, however. By 27 November 1662, when he drew up his will, he was "sicke and weake in body" and died on 3 December 1662, leaving his daughter Lydia, apparently his only surviving child, as his heir and executor; his second wife had predeceased him in 1661. Both were buried at St Lawrence Pountney, London. In his will he left several books, including the register of the Merchant Taylor's School, in which he had documented his thoughts, to the library of Sion College, London.

== Political views ==
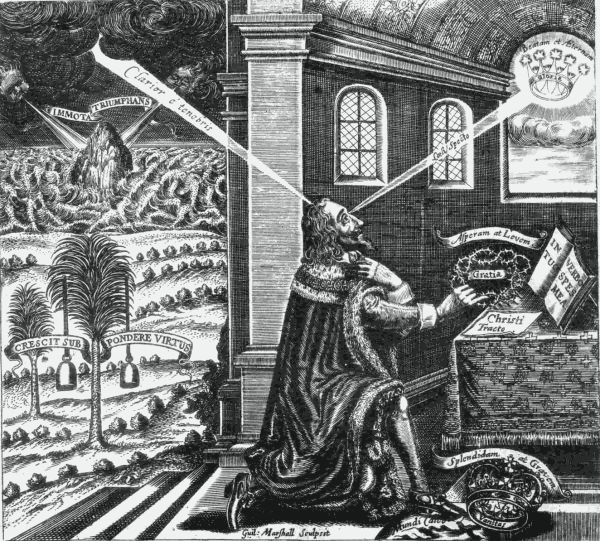
The famous frontispiece of the Eikon Basilike, demonstrating its pro-Royalist nature

A register Dugard kept of life at the Merchant Taylor's school would appear to demonstrate Royalist tendencies. On the day of the beheading of Charles I, 30 January 1649, he wrote, in Greek, firstly, that he thought that Charles, "the best of kings", was "fallen by the hands of cruel and wicked men", and secondly, that he thought Charles was a martyr for the laws of God and of his country. There are also two more Greek verses, similar in meaning, on the day of the burial of Oliver Cromwell's mother in Westminster Abbey: "Here lieth the mother of a cursed son who has been the ruin of two kings and of three kingdoms". For printing a strongly pro-Royalist book, Defensio regia pro Carolo primo, written by Claudius Salmasius, Dugard was incarcerated at Newgate and dismissed from the school.

After his release, however, Dugard started to print propaganda not for the royalists, as he had done before, but for the Parliamentarians. Apparently at the behest of Milton, Dugard took part in an attempt to disrupt royalist literature and introduced a non-genuine chapter (Pamela's Prayer, an extract from Sir Phillip Sydney's Arcadia) into an edition of the Eikon Basilike that he was printing. This is said to have damaged the reputation of the strongly pro-royalist work, and strengthened the parliamentarian cause. Milton was then employed by the Council of State to posthumously reprimand the King for including it.

In addition, Dugard printed Milton's response to Salmasius' Defensio regia pro Carolo primo, now known as Defensio pro Populo Anglicano, one of the great works of propaganda of all time. Conversely, Dugard also published Catechesis Ecclesiarum Poloniae et Lithuaniae, a work critical of Luther, Oliver Cromwell and Protestantism, in 1652. The work was seized and publicly burned, yet Dugard escaped further imprisonment, and only had his printing press confiscated once again.

== Publications ==
Dugard was an editor and author of books on rhetoric and language, as well as a publisher of textbooks, other educational, theological, scientific, and political works, and a newspaper.

=== Printed ===
In addition to his politically sensitive works, documented above, Dugard also printed a great number of other works. From 1648 to 1661, by the estimation of Leona Rostenberg, some 171 books rolled off his press, including political tracts and works on education, theology, medicine, science, economics, and literature. This included works written by the physicians William Harvey and Francis Glisson and the agriculturist Sir Richard Weston.

In 1652, Dugard's publication of the Racovian Catechism, translated in English, was denounced as a "blasphemous and scandalous book", all copies of which were ordered to be seized and publicly burnt. However, his relations with the government do not seem diminished as he continued to print works praising the policies and victories of the Commonwealth and its army, including, in 1652, Milton's Latin translation of the declaration of war against the states of Holland and, on the order of the committee for foreign affairs, English and Latin versions of John Selden's Mare clausum.

=== Written ===
Specialising in school textbooks, over the course of his life Dugard published a variety of works for the use of local schools:

- Rhetorices elementa (Principles of Rhetoric, 1648).
- The English Rudiments of the Latine Tongue (1656)
- Lexicon Graeci Testamenti aphabeticum; una cum explicatione grammatica vocum singularum, in usum tironum. Necnon Concordantia singulis dictionibus apposita, in usum theologiae canditatorum (1660); reprinted by William Bowyer in 1774, who left it "accurately corrected and much enlarged, and often wished in his latter days he had been able to publish for the use of schools and the benefit of young students in divinity".
- Rhetorices compendium (published in octavo format);
- Luciani Samosatensis dialogorum selectorum libri duo, cum interpretatione Latina, multis in locis emendata, et ad calcem adjecta (also octavo)
- A Greek Grammar

== See also ==
- List of headmasters at Colchester Royal Grammar School
