= Thomas Colshill =

16th-century English politician

Thomas Colshill (c. 1518 – 1595), of London, Hackney, Middlesex and Chigwell, Essex, was an English politician.

== Family ==
Colshill was the son of William Colshill and the brother of the MP, Robert Colshill. He married Mary Crayford (d.1599), and they had three daughters.

The couple is buried in St Mary's Church, Chigwell, where a monument in their memory was installed by their daughters, Susanna (wife of Sir Edward Stanhope MP), and Anne (Mrs Jasper Leeke).

== Career ==
He was a Member (MP) of the Parliament of England for Knaresborough in 1558 and for Aylesbury in 1563. He served as Inspector of Customs for the City of London.
