= Buckhurst Hill County High School =

School in Chigwell, Essex, England

Location
- Roding Lane; Chigwell, Essex; England; 51.627°N 0.0641°E ,

Information
- Type: Grammar school, and later comprehensive
- Established: 1938
- Closed: 1989
- Local authority: Essex
- Gender: Boys
- Age: 11 to 18
- Website: http://www.bhchs.co.uk

Buckhurst Hill County High School, BHCHS, (1938–1989) was a secondary school in Chigwell, Essex.

== History ==
It opened on 15 September 1938. It was near to RAF Chigwell and the River Roding.

In 1953 there were 549 boys and the staff consisted of the headmaster and nineteen assistant masters.

=== Comprehensive ===
It became a comprehensive in the mid-1970s. The school was combined with two other schools in 1989 to become Roding Valley High School, located on a different site. The BHCHS building was subsequently sold off by Essex CC and was the home of an independent faith school called Guru Gobind Singh Khalsa College which closed in 2023.

== Former Pupils' Association ==
The former pupils' association, Old Buckwellians, is still active with 1600 members.

== Notable alumni ==
- David Braben, co-writer of the computer game Elite
- Prof Rodney Brazier, Professor of Constitutional Law since 1992 at the University of Manchester
- Prof Ronald Clements, Samuel Davidson Professor of Old Testament Studies from 1983 to 1992 of King's College London
- Nigel Cole, Film Director
- Joe Dever, author and games designer
- David Evennett, Conservative MP since 2005 for Bexleyheath and Crayford and from 1983 to 1997 for Erith and Crayford
- Mike Gapes, Labour MP since 1992 for Ilford South
- Peter Haining, writer
- Terrence Hardiman, actor
- Barry Hearn, sports impresario and former owner of Leyton Orient FC
- Rt Rev Graham Kings, Bishop of Sherborne since 2009
- Jason Merrells, actor
- Stan Newens, Labour MP from 1974 to 1983 for Harlow and from 1964 to 1970 for Epping
- Slipmatt, Matthew Nelson, electronic music producer and DJ
- Stephen Street, music producer
- Sir Patrick Vallance, physician and scientist
