= Bagdale Hall =

Historic building in Whitby, North Yorkshire, England

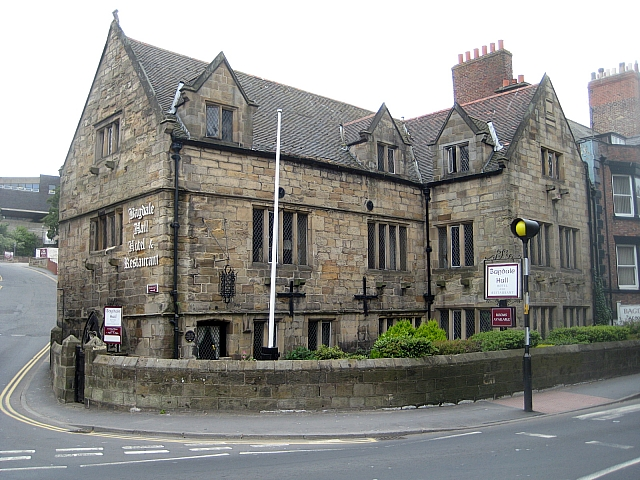
- The building in 2010

- Location within North Yorkshire
- Alternative names: Bagdale Old Hall

General information
- Location: Bagdale, Whitby, North Yorkshire, England
- Coordinates: 54°29′06″N 0°37′04″W
- Year built: Early 16th century
- Renovated: 1883 (restored)

Website
- bagdale.co.uk

Listed Building – Grade II*
- Official name: Bagdale Old Hall
- Designated: 23 February 1954
- Reference no.: 1148376

Bagdale Hall, also known as Bagdale Old Hall, is a historic building on Bagdale in Whitby, a town in North Yorkshire, England.

The building was constructed in the early 16th century, and is sometimes dated to 1516. Its first resident was James Conyers, then around the end of the century it was sold to the Bushell family, with later owners including Browne Bushell. By the 1700s, it was known as "Bagdale Old Hall", and it had a reputation for being haunted. In the 19th century, it was divided into apartments and rented out. It was heavily restored in 1883, and used partly as a school and partly as a shelter for homeless people. It was purchased by Percy Shaw Jeffrey in 1914 and further restored, and was Grade II* listed in 1954. Around this time, it was converted into a hotel, which has since expanded into neighbouring buildings.

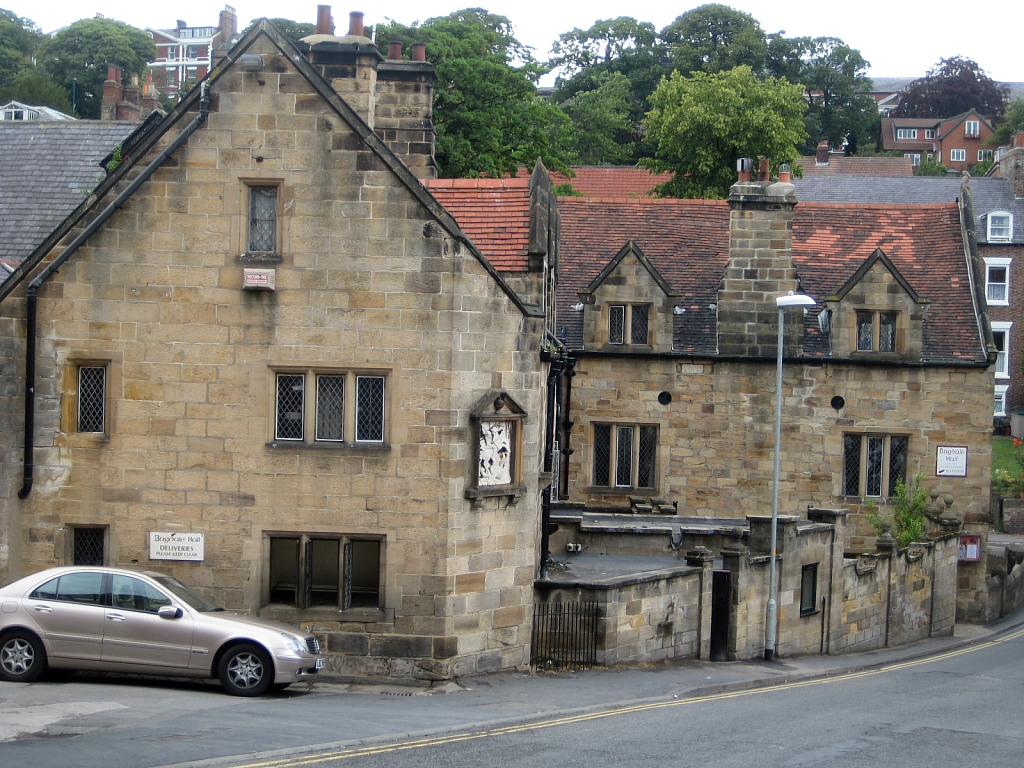
Rear of the building

The building is constructed of stone with a cornice above the upper floor, and a tile roof with stone-capped gables and kneelers. It has two storeys and attics, and an L-shaped plan, with a main range of two bays, and a gabled cross-wing on the right. The doorway has a segmental head, the windows are mullioned with three or four lights, and on the attics are gabled dormers with two-light mullioned windows.

== See also ==
- Grade II* listed buildings in North Yorkshire (district)
- Listed buildings in Whitby (central area - west)
