= Guru Gobind Singh Khalsa College =

Location
- Roding Lane; Chigwell, Essex, IG7 6BQ; England; 51.62729°N 0.06427°E

Information
- Type: Independent school
- Religious affiliation: Sikhism
- Closed: September 2023
- Department for Education URN: 115437 Tables
- Ofsted: Reports
- Gender: Coeducational
- Age: 3 to 19
- Capacity: 500
- Website: www.ggskcollege.co.uk

Guru Gobind Singh Khalsa College was an independent faith school in Chigwell, Essex. It occupied the buildings of the former Buckhurst Hill County High School for Boys.

The school was judged Inadequate by Ofsted in three consecutive inspections up to 2019. In 2020 it was judged Good.

In 2023, on the 6th of October, the school ceased operations.
