= David Smith (rugby union, born 1988) =

English rugby union player

David Smith (born 15 July 1988 (age 37)) is a rugby union footballer who played at wing for Northampton Saints and England Sevens.

Smith played for England in the 2007 Under 19 Rugby World Championship.

He attended Colchester Royal Grammar School's Sixth Form.
