= Roding Valley High School =

Location
- Alderton Hill; Loughton, Essex, IG10 3JA; England; 51°38′36″N 0°03′22″E

Information
- Type: Academy
- Motto: Aspiration, Respect, Endeavour
- Established: September 1989; 37 years ago
- Local authority: Essex
- Department for Education URN: 145597 Tables
- Ofsted: Reports
- Headteacher: Dan Charlton
- Gender: Co-educational
- Age: 11 to 18
- Enrolment: around 1450
- Colours: Royal blue, Black, White
- Website: http://www.rodingvalley.net

Roding Valley High School is a co-educational secondary school and sixth form located in Loughton, Essex, England, founded in September 1989 by the merger of three schools.

== History ==
Its site formerly housed the Loughton County High School for Girls, and the other two schools were Buckhurst Hill County High School (for boys) and Epping Forest High School (itself formerly the Lucton School).

The school was awarded "Healthy School" status in 2007. The school has more than 1,200 students. and has been rated Good with Outstanding Features in the latest Ofsted report as well as getting an Outstanding for its 6th form.

In September 2015, the school opened the Epping Forest Sixth Form which is listed for 16-18's within the school.

Previously a community school administered by Essex County Council, in June 2018 Roding Valley High School converted to academy status. The school is now sponsored by The Chelmsford Learning Partnership.

== Staff ==
On 28 March 2017, it was announced that the headteacher, James Luck, had resigned via an email to the parents from the chair of governors, Paul Wershof. Sharon Jenner was the former Head of School, with Paul Banks being the Executive Head. James Luck joined the school in 2014. He replaced Paul Banks who left the school after 5 years. Prior to Paul Banks, the head teacher was Geoff Mangan who was in the post for many years. The current Head Of School is Mr Daniel Charlton who has been in the role since September 2023.
