= Thomas Edwards (VC) =

Recipient of the Victoria Cross

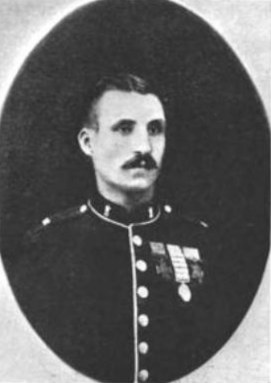
- Born: 19 April 1863; Brill, Buckinghamshire, UK
- Died: 27 March 1953 (aged 89); Woodford Bridge, London, UK
- Burial place: St Mary's Churchyard, Chigwell
- Military career
- Allegiance: United Kingdom
- Branch: British Army
- Service years: 1880–1892
- Rank: Private
- Units: The Black Watch (Royal Highlanders)
- Conflicts: 1882 Anglo-Egyptian War; Mahdist War
- Awards: Victoria Cross

Thomas Edwards VC (19 April 1863 – 27 March 1952) born in England, was a recipient of the Victoria Cross, the highest and most prestigious award for gallantry in the face of the enemy that can be awarded to British and Commonwealth forces.

== Details ==
He was 20 years old, and a private in the 1st Battalion, The Black Watch (Royal Highlanders), British Army during the Mahdist War when the following deed took place for which he was awarded the VC.

On 13 March 1884 at the Battle of Tamai, Sudan, when both members of the crew of one of the Gatling guns had been killed, Private Edwards, after bayoneting two Arabs and himself receiving a wound from a spear, remained with the gun, defending it throughout the action. His citation reads:

For the conspicuous bravery displayed by him in defence of one of the guns of the Naval Brigade, at the battle of Tamai, on 13th March, 1884. This man (who was attached to the Naval Brigade as Mule Driver) was beside the gun with Lieutenant Almack,.R.N., and a blue jacket. Both the latter were killed, and Edwards, after bayonetting two Arabs, and himself receiving a wound with a spear, rejoined the ranks with his mules, and subsequently did good service in remaining by his gun throughout the action.

== Medal ==
His Victoria Cross is displayed at the Black Watch Museum in Balhousie Castle, Perth, Scotland.

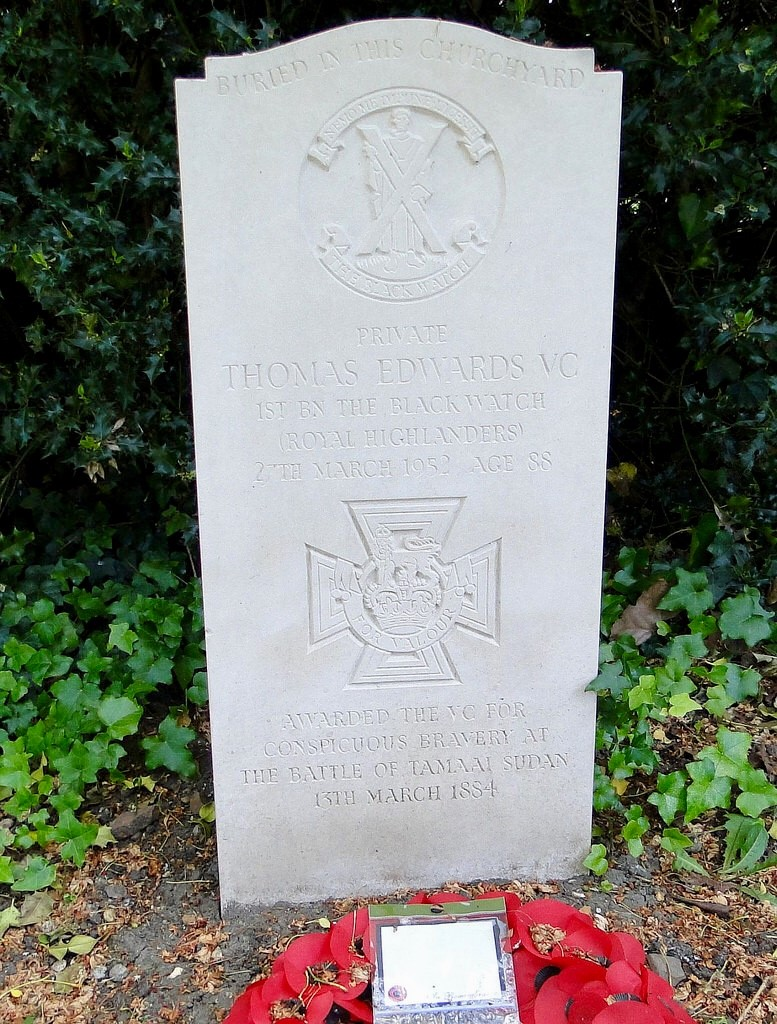
The grave of Thomas Edwards in the churchyard of St Mary's Church, Chigwell, Essex
