= Epping Forest Country Club =

Group of three night clubs

Coordinates: 51.6408°N 0.0934°E

The Epping Forest Country Club was a group of three night clubs on the Essex/London border, just outside Chigwell, Essex. The various night clubs were well known throughout South East of England and attracted many big-name acts as well as many celebrity visitors. The venues closed in early 2002 after a number of high-profile incidents in addition to complaints from the local residents about noise.

== Overview ==
The three venues were called 'Atlantis', 'The Casino Club', and Woolston Hall Known as 'The Country Club'. All but one of the buildings have now been demolished and a Holmes Place (now Nuffield Health) health club built on the site. The only original building that remains is that of 'The Casino Club' and its swimming pool complex, which used to host 'Splash' parties where over 5,000 people used to attend.

== History ==
The original 'Woolston Hall' dated back to 1740, and was owned by the Scott family and sold in around 1930 to the Co-Op and was used as their sport and social club. In the late '70s Woolston Hall was converted into a high class private members club by Sean Connery and 1966 World Cup winning captain Bobby Moore. One night in the late 1980s a group of local businessmen and their wives attempted to get into a local club in Walthamstow, unfortunately for the owner of this club his doormen decided not to let them in because only two of the party were members. One of the group was a local builder and after being refused entry decided to purchase the lease of 'Woolston Hall', which by now was suffering from a lack of customers. The club was swiftly closed down and turned into a night club, with much less strict membership criteria, and soon attracted huge numbers of local customers, but was still restricted to over-25s. It soon became overwhelmed with its own success, the club facilities were extended to include, tennis, golf, venues for weddings, private functions, corporate events and a new fitness centre, then in the mid-'90s added 'The Jungle', which after a few years was refurbished as 'Atlantis'.

== The clubs ==
=== Atlantis ===
This was the biggest of the three clubs with a capacity of over 1500, and on many nights this was easily reached. The venue underwent a refurbishment towards the end of the 1990s converting it from a jungle theme to a more upmarket night club; however, this refurbishment also included a new sound system which was much more powerful than the original one, which was unfortunately part of the venue's downfall as the roof was thin and most of the sound generated escaped into the surrounding area, much to the annoyance of the local residents, some living over a mile away. The landscape of the Roding Valley in which the club was situated funnelled the sound towards the village of Abridge, and across the valley towards Debden and Loughton.

The original 'Jungle' room not only was themed on a jungle. The original concept for the Jungle Room was by Oliver Wheeler, a London special events set builder, who also then built the set for the club was in fact inspired for the idea by a recent trip to South Africa where he had seen the Jungle Forest Cafe at the Sun City Casino.

The venue was open to over-18s and as well as having its regular events it also had many externally promoted events and under-18s nights.

There were also two large airport-style metal detector arches on the front entrance through which all visitors had to pass, as no metal objects (except clothing) were allowed in the venue. There was also a complete ban on glass inside the venue.

=== Casino Club ===
This was the over-30s venue and was considered to be a more up-market venue. This venue was much smaller than Atlantis. Part of it still remains and is now being used as a creche for the health club. Behind the Casino club was the outdoor swimming pool complex which hosted 'Splash' events where over 5,000 clubbers would attend.

=== Woolston Hall known as The NightClub ===
This was advertised as an over-25s venue; however, many reports suggest people younger than this were regularly allowed in. The venue was a listed building.

== Years after closure ==
After the trio of clubs closed, things moved quite rapidly. The Atlantis building was first demolished, and redevelopment work began on the site to provide a 40,000-square-foot health and fitness club for Holmes Place. A new high tech driving range was built along with the new health club building on the other side of the car park. The car park was renovated and the entire site tidied up. The former Casino club was turned into a bar for the members of the health club. The original 'Woolston hall' remained empty and suffered from neglect until 2007 when it was purchased and refurbished, and was about to be opened as a restaurant when a serious fire broke out.

== Fire ==
The golf club owners spent an estimated £750,000 on renovating the building into a high-class restaurant, however in the early hours of Wednesday 17 September 2008, a serious fire broke out within Woolston Hall, in the older part of the building, that was undergoing renovation work. The fire totally gutted the stately manor house. Essex fire brigade reported significant problems fighting the fire, not only because of the scaffolding surrounding the building, but also due to a lack of high flow water supply. This was soon resolved by draining the swimming pool, which was once used for 'Splash' nights in Atlantis, to fight the fire.

It has been reported that the golf club had only insured the original £1m purchase price and had not covered the costs of the renovation work.

This put an end to the re-opening plans, which had been put on hold for almost 2 years from the initial plans due to financial problems related to the 'crunch'. The cause of the fire is yet unknown and the final investigation results are awaited.

Planning permission was submitted to Epping Forest council post fire to turn the building into a restaurant which were accepted. In late 2010, after substantial rebuilding and renovation, the building finally reopened as a restaurant, under the name of 'Mooros'. The name is based on some previous owners of the hall in the mid-1970s—Bobby Moore and Sir Sean Connery.

== See also ==
- List of electronic dance music venues
