= Edward Philip Harrison =

British physicist and meteorologist

Prof Edward Philip Harrison FRSE (1877 – 6 May 1948) was a British physicist and meteorologist. As a military engineer he played a role in the development of torpedoes and magnetic mines, and laid the foundations for the creation of the Limpet mine.

== Life ==
He was born in London in 1877 the son of Robert William Harrison. He studied physics at University College London and did further postgraduate training in Zurich.

His first major role was as professor of physics at the Presidency College in Calcutta, India in India where he simultaneously was the head of the Calcutta Observatory. In 1913 he was elected a fellow of the Royal Society of Edinburgh. His proposers were Cargill Gilston Knott, Sir William Fletcher Barrett, George Alexander Carse, and Sir Edmund Taylor Whittaker.

During the First World War he appears to have been deeply involved in the development of torpedoes and magnetic mines. Information on this is scant due to its classified nature. In 1923 he began working as Chief Scientist at the Royal Navy's new HMS Vernon a land-based research station specialising in torpedoes. He continued this role until 1937, being critical in the development of the Limpet mine. His role during the Second World War is again unclear, but he seems to have been involved in further naval weaponry research.

He died in Chigwell Row in Essex on 6 May 1948.

== Publications ==
- A Course of Practical Physics (1910)
- Recent Observations Concerning the Constitution of Matter (1922)
