= Andrew Sanger =

British writer

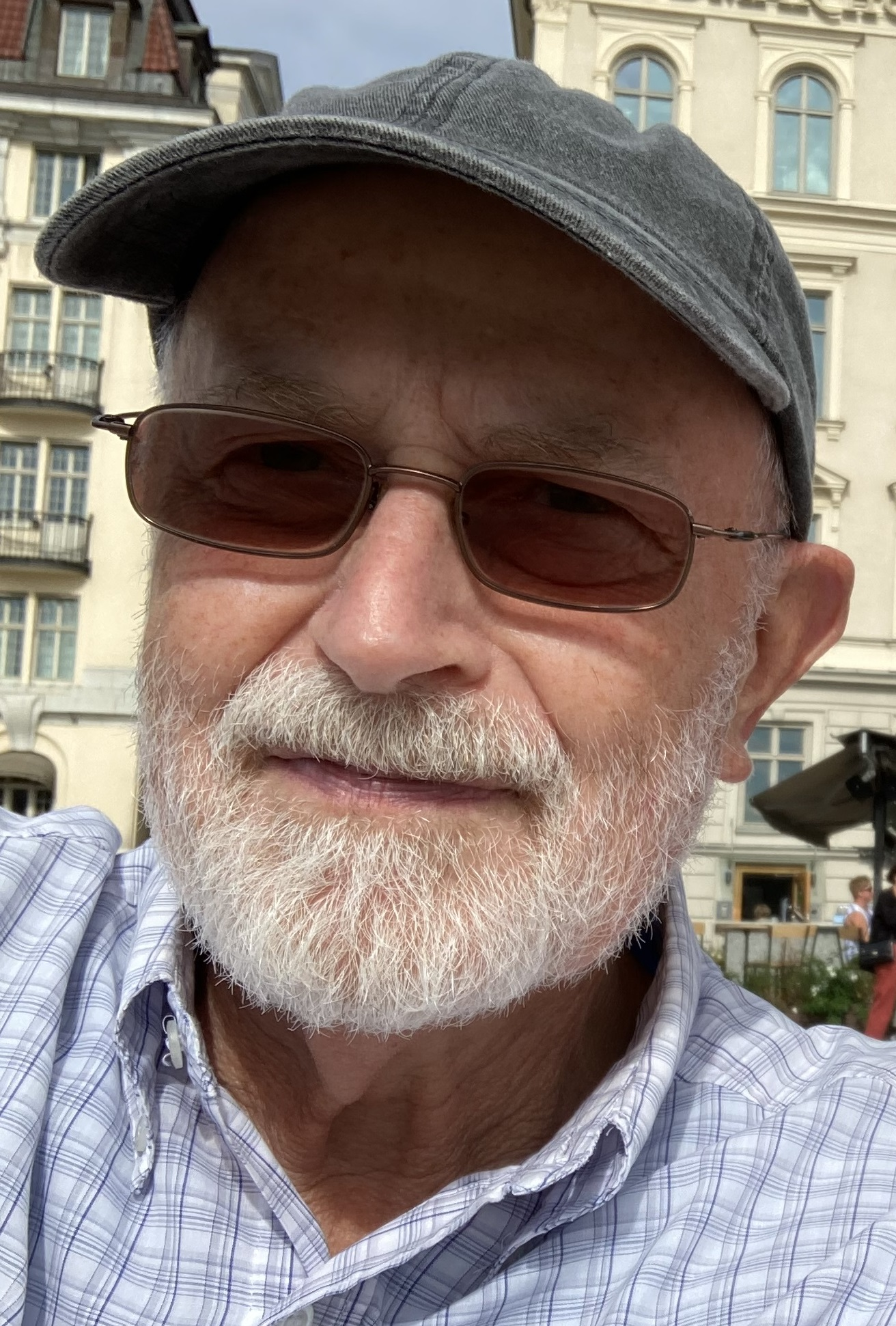
Andrew Sanger

Andrew Sanger (born 1948) is a British freelance journalist and travel writer, best known for many popular travel guides to France and the French regions, although he has also authored more than 40 guides to other locations, and five novels.

Sanger was educated at the Lycée Français Charles de Gaulle in London, Colchester Royal Grammar School, University College London and Sussex University.

Sanger is the author of The Vegetarian Traveller (1987), a guide to the foods and eating habits around Europe and the Mediterranean, which was one of the first travel guides for vegetarians and was a best-seller in the United Kingdom; and a commentary on Robert Louis Stevenson's An Inland Voyage (1991). His guide Exploring Rural France (1988 and subsequent editions) gave early encouragement to ordinary tourists visiting France to get off the beaten track and discover more about the country. The book gave a rise to a series published by A&C Black (London) urging the same approach to other countries. Sanger also published a memoir or novel, Love (2005, 2015, 2024), describing life in Berkeley, California during the "Summer of Love" and travels during the hippy era, including the "hippie trail" to India.

Sanger's novel The J-Word (2009 and 2018), about secular Jewish identity, is not on a travel-related theme, and is set in the neighbourhood of Golders Green in his native north-west London. The J-Word featured at London's Hampstead & Highgate Literary Festival (2009) and Jewish Book Week (2009). The J-Word is a set reading list book on the "Judaism as a Lived Religion" course at Lund University, Sweden. Sanger's novel The Slave (2013), about human trafficking and slavery, is also set in Golders Green. The Unknown Mrs Rosen (2020), about a courageous former spy now elderly and in need of care, has a more evident travel connection with settings in various parts of the UK, Germany and France. On Romford Road (2025), a four-part story of a hundred-year feud between two families rising from poverty to prosperity, set almost entirely in the backstreets and housing estates of East London, has been described "a companion to the social history of East London." His short novel Bella's Wish (2026), about an elderly man's search for a missing friend, contrasting their different attitudes to the end of life, is set in rural Languedoc in southern France.

In addition, Sanger has written hundreds of articles, almost all on travel, for British newspapers and other publications. From 1990 to 1999, he was editor of the French Railways (later Rail Europe) customer magazine Top Rail. In 1994 and 1996 he received Travelex Travel Writers' Awards for articles published in BBC Holiday Magazine and in Rail Europe Magazine. Sanger is listed as a founder member of travel media organisation Travelwriters UK.

== Selected bibliography ==
- Bella's Wish. (Focus Books, 2026. ISBN 9781068328015)
- On Romford Road. (Focus Books, 2025. ISBN 9780955820182)
- The Unknown Mrs Rosen. (Focus Books, 2020. ISBN 9780955820168)
- DK Eyewitness Top 10 Dublin. (co-author; Dorling Kindersley, new editions 2005, 2007, 2009, 2011, 2013, 2015, 2018. ISBN 978-0-2412-9624-0)
- Love. (Focus Books, 2015. ISBN 9780955820137)
- The Slave. (Focus Books, 2013. ISBN 978-09558201-1-3)
- FootprintFocus Normandy Coast. (Footprint Handbooks, 2013. ISBN 9781908206978)
- FootprintFocus Rouen & Upper Normandy. (Footprint Handbooks, 2013. ISBN 978-1-909268-12-8)
- Driving Guide – Provence & the Cote d'Azur. (4th edn, Thomas Cook, 2011)
- Driving Guide – Loire Valley. (main author, 4th edn, Thomas Cook, 2011)
- FootprintFrance Normandy. (1st edition, Footprint Handbooks, 2010. ISBN 978-1-906098-94-0)
- The J-Word. (Snowbooks, 2009. ISBN 978-1-905005-95-6; 2nd edition, Focus Books, 2018. ISBN 9780955820151)
- Michelin Green Guide France. 2008. ISBN 978-1-906261-16-0 (principal writer, English edition)
- AA Essential Spiral Tenerife. AA, 2007. ISBN 978-0-7495-4968-8
- AA Essential Spiral Lanzarote. AA, 2007. ISBN 978-0-7495-4959-6
- Drive Around Loire Valley. Thomas Cook, 2007, 2009. ISBN 978-1-84157-740-1 (main author)
- Drive Around Burgundy. Thomas Cook, 2007, 2009. ISBN 978-1-84157-741-8
- Drive Around Provence. Thomas Cook, 2007, 2009. ISBN 978-1-84157-782-1
- AA Essential Channel Hopping. (AA, UK, 1999, 2001)
- AA Essential Lanzarote & Fuerteventura. (AA, UK, 1999, 2000, 2001, 2002, 2003, 2004, relaunched as Essential Spiral 2007)
- AA Essential Tenerife. (AA, UK, 2000, 2001, 2002, 203, 2004, 2005, 2006, 2007, relaunched as Essential Spiral 2007)
- AA Explorer Israel. (AA, UK, 1996, 1998, 2000, 2006)
- AA TwinPack Lanzarote & Fuerteventura. (AA, UK, 2002)
- AA TwinPack Tenerife. (AA, UK, 2002. ISBN 0-7495-3460-5)
- An Inland Voyage. (Guide by AS added to book by Robert Louis Stevenson, Cockbird Press, UK, 1991. ISBN 1-873054-02-5)
- Discover Brussels. (WHS/Thomas Cook, UK, 1999)
- Exploring Rural France. (Helm/A&C Black, UK, 1988, 1990, 1993; Passport, US, 1988, 1990, 1993)
- Exploring Rural Ireland. (Helm/A&C Black, UK, 1989; Passport, US, 1989; Mingus, Netherlands, 1991)
- Eyewitness Top 10 Dublin. (Dorling Kindersley; co-author; first edition UK 2003 ISBN 0-7513-4846-5)
- Fodors Exploring Israel. (Fodor. US. 1996, 1998, 2000)
- God tur til Lanzarote & Fuerteventura. (Norway. 2000. ISBN 82-03-22432-6)
- HotSpots Lanzarote. (Thomas Cook, UK, 2006. ISBN 1-84157-525-9)
- Israel – US Library of Congress Talking Book. (Book no: 1984 – RC 20605; 1998 – RC 44904)
- Languedoc & Roussillon. (Helm/A&C Black, UK, 1989, 1994, 1997; Passport, US, 1989; 1994, 1997)
- Long Weekends in France. (Penguin, UK, 1992)
- Must See Brussels. (Thomas Cook, UK, 1999)
- Ontdek Landelijk Frankrijk. (Mingus, Netherlands, 1990)
- Ontdek Landelijk Ierland. (Mingus, Netherlands, 1991).
- Rough Guide to France, The. (co-author, 1st ed'n, Rough Guides, UK, 1986)
- Signpost Guide Burgundy and the Rhone Valley. (Thomas Cook, UK, 2000; Globe Pequot, US. 2000)
- Signpost Guide Loire Valley. (Thomas Cook, UK, 2002; Globe Pequot, US. 2002)
- Signpost Guide: Provence & the Cote d'Azur. (Thomas Cook, UK, 2000; Globe Pequot, US. 2000)
- South-West France. (Helm/A&C Black, UK, 1990, 1994; Passport, US, 1990, 1994)
- Vegetarian Guide to Britain & Europe, The. (Simon & Schuster, UK, 1992)
- Vegetarian Traveller, The. (Thorsons, UK, 1987; Grafton, UK, 1991; Mingus, Netherlands, 1992)
- Vegetarier op Reis, De. (Mingus, Netherlands, 1992)
- Villages of Northern France. (Pavilion, UK, 1994)
- Viva Guide Israel. (Viva, Germany. 1996) ISBN 3-89480-615-X
- Viva Twin Lanzarote & Fuerteventura. (Viva, Germany. 1999) ISBN 3-89480-232-4
