= William Ashwell Shenstone =

English chemist, schoolmaster and author

- Born: December 1, 1850; Wells-next-the-Sea, Norfolk, England
- Died: February 3, 1908 (aged 57); Mullion, Cornwall
- Occupation: Schoolmaster
- Known for: Chemist

William Ashwell Shenstone FIC FRS (1 December 1850 in Wells-next-the-Sea, Norfolk, England – 3 February 1908 in Mullion, Cornwall) was a chemist, schoolmaster and published author.

== Life ==
Shenstone was born on 1 December 1850 to James Burt Byron Shenstone, a pharmaceutical chemist in Colchester, and his wife Jemima; he was named after the poet William Shenstone, a distant relative. He was educated at Colchester Royal Grammar School, and later as an apprentice to his father, though, during the latter, he was caught in a fire and suffered from pains throughout his life. He married Jane Mildred, the daughter of the rector of Wootton, on 27 December 1883, with whom he had two children, a son and a daughter. Shenstone died on 3 February 1908 at the Polurrian Hotel, Mullion, Cornwall, at the age of fifty-eight.

By trade a schoolmaster, Shenstone joined Clifton College, Bristol, as assistant to William Tilden in 1874, before being appointed science master at Taunton School the next year, and in 1877 at Exeter grammar school. In 1880 he succeeded Tilden as senior science master at Clifton College; there he remained until his death. More significantly, however, Shenstone was also an established chemist. He won the Pereira medal in 1872, conducted research into terpenes and the solubility of salts at high temperatures together with Tilden, and on his own the preparation of ozone and the properties of highly purified substances.

Shenstone became a fellow of the Chemical Society in 1876, was a fellow of the Institute of Chemistry from 1878, an original member of the Society of Chemical Industry and a fellow of the Royal Society from 9 June 1898. According to Who's Who, his hobbies were "experimental work, general reading, cycling".

== Published works ==
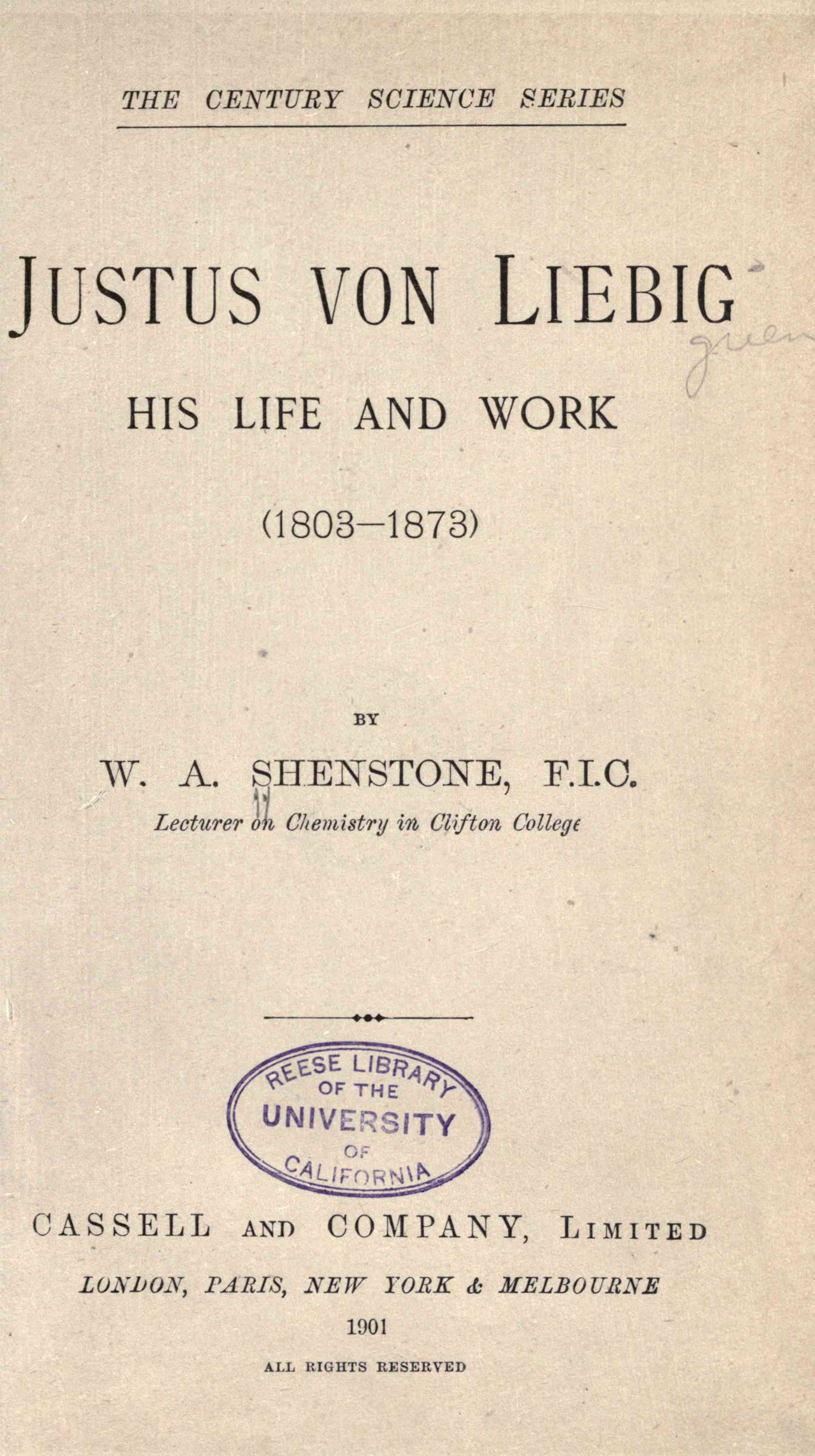
Justus von Liebig, 1901

- Justus von Liebig. London: Cassell. 1901.
- Elements of inorganic chemistry (Arnold, 1900)
- Methods of glass blowing (Longmans, 1902)
- The new physics and chemistry (Smith, Elder & co., 1906)
- The methods of glass-blowing and of working silica in the oxy-gas flame (Longmans, Green, 1916)
