= Michael Rosenthal =

Art historian (born 1950)

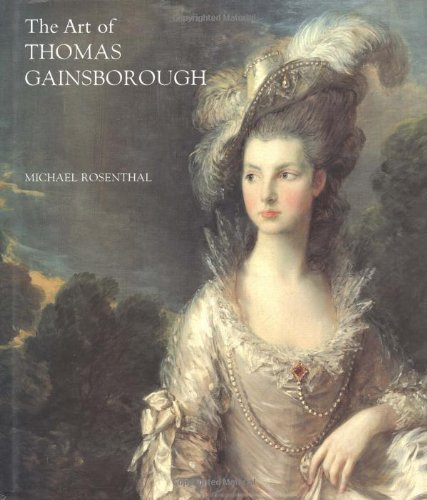
The cover of The Art of Thomas Gainsborough: "A little business for the eye", 1999.

Michael J. Rosenthal (born 1950) is emeritus professor of the history of art at the University of Warwick. He is a specialist both in British art and culture of the eighteenth and early nineteenth centuries, and the arts of early colonial Australia.

== Early life and education ==
Michael Rosenthal attended Colchester Royal Grammar School, then under the aegis of headteacher, Jack Elam. He received his BA from the University of London, his MA from the University of Cambridge and his PhD from the Courtauld Institute of Art, University of London in 1978.

== Academic career and interests ==
Michael Rosenthal was Leverhulme Research Fellow at Jesus College, Cambridge before taking up a post in the Department of History of Art at the University of Warwick.

His scholarship examines British art, particularly landscape, within social and cultural contexts, and focusing on the 18th and early 19th centuries. His 1977 PhD thesis at the Courtauld Institute of Art was entitled Constable and the valley of the Stour. He has authored a number of books including British landscape painting (1982); Constable, the painter and his landscape (1983); The Art of Thomas Gainsborough: "a little business for the eye" (1999); and Thomas Gainsborough: 1727-1788 to accompany Tate Britain's major exhibition on the artist in 2002. He authored the Encyclopædia Britannica entry on Constable.

Many of his books are generously illustrated. Photographs contributed by Rosenthal to the Conway Library at the Courtauld Institute of Art are currently being digitised as part of the Courtauld Connects project.

Rosenthal is interested not only in the aesthetics of landscape painting but also its social and ideological meaning and uses, for example in asserting a family's ownership over the land, structures and living things depicted. His study of Thomas Gainsborough examines not only the paintings but also the artist's canny exploitation of the developing art market of the time.

Rosenthal has spent considerable time in Australia over the years and is an authority on the art of early colonial Australia. He is working on a book about picture making in Australia from 1788 to 1840, provisionally entitled The Artless Landscape.

He has held visiting Fellowships at the Yale Center for British Art, the University of Western Australia and the Australian National University, and in March–April 2007 was Macgeorge Fellow at the University of Melbourne. He retired from Warwick University in 2010, and was then made an Emeritus Professor in the Department of History of Art. In July 2012, Walkabout: A symposium in honour of Professor Michael Rosenthal, was held at the Paul Mellon Centre for Studies in British Art, London.

== Exhibitions ==
Michael Rosenthal worked as a guest curator on several notable exhibitions over the course of his career. In 2002 he was lead curator of Tate Britain's exhibition, Gainsborough, which brought together from around the world the largest ever collection of paintings and drawings by the artist. The exhibition subsequently travelled to the National Gallery of Art, Washington and the Museum of Fine Arts, Boston.

In 2013 he was the curator, with Anne Lyles, of the exhibition Turner and Constable: sketching from nature: Works from the Tate Collection, held first at Compton Verney, and subsequently at both the Turner Contemporary gallery in Margate and the Laing in Newcastle.

== Selected publications ==
=== Books ===
- Hogarth, Jupiter Books, 1980, ISBN 9780906379431
- British landscape painting. Cornell University Press/ Phaidon, 1982. ISBN 978-0714821986
- Constable: The painter and his landscape. Yale University Press, New Haven, 1983. ISBN 0300030142
- Constable, Thames & Hudson, London, 1987, ISBN 9780500202111
- Glorious Nature: British Landscape Painting, 1750-1850 (with Katharine Baetjer), Hudson Hills Press, 1993, ISBN 978-1555950927
- Prospects for the nation: Recent essays in British landscape, 1750-1880. Yale University Press, New Haven, 1997. (Editor, with Christiana Payne and Scott Wilcox) ISBN 978-0300063837
- The Art of Thomas Gainsborough: "A little business for the eye". Yale University Press, New Haven, 1999. ISBN 978-0300081374
- Thomas Gainsborough 1727-1788, Tate Publishing, 2002. (Editor with Martin Myrone) ISBN 978-1854374448
- Turner and Constable sketching from nature: Works from the Tate collection. Tate Publishing, London, 2013. ISBN 978-1849762069

=== Articles, chapters & papers dealing with the art of colonial Australia ===
- 'Decapitating the Swells: William Baker's Heads of the People' in T. Bonyhady, A. Sayers (eds.) Heads of the People: a Portrait of Colonial Australia, Canberra (National Gallery of Australia) 2000 pp. 43–57.
- 'A view of New Holland: aspects of the Colonial Prospect' in Christiana Payne, William Vaughan (eds.) English Accents. Interactions with British Art c.1776-1855, Aldershot & Burlington VT (Ashgate) 2004 pp. 79–99
- 'Impressions of Australia' Art Monthly Australia 200 (June 2007) pp. 21–27
- 'London versus Sydney, 1815-1823: the politics of colonial architecture' Journal of Historical Geography 34 2 (April 2008) 191-219
- 'The artless landscape: figuring colonial Australia' The National Gallery of Art, Washington D.C. February 2004
- 'London versus Sydney: the politics of colonial architecture c1810-25' The Power Institute of Art, University of Sydney, March 2006; the University of Western Australia April 2006
