= Colchester Royal Grammar School =

Grammar school in Colchester, Essex, England

Location
- 6 Lexden Road; Colchester, Essex, CO3 3ND; England; 51.887°N 0.887°E

Information
- Type: Grammar, Academy
- Motto: Vitae Corona Fides (Faith is the Crown of Life)
- Religious affiliation: Christian
- Established: 1128; 898 years ago Refounded 1539; Refounded 1584
- Founders: John and Joseph Elianore
- Department for Education URN: 149899 Tables
- Ofsted: Reports
- Chair of Local Board: Janet Perry
- Headmaster: John Russell
- Staff: 110
- Gender: Male (Mixed Sixth Form)
- Age: 11 to 18
- Enrolment: 931
- Houses: Dugard's; Harsnett's; Parr's; Shaw Jeffrey's
- Colours: Purple & gold
- Publication: The Colcestrian
- Website: www.crgs.co.uk

Colchester Royal Grammar School (CRGS) is a state-funded grammar school in Colchester, Essex. It was founded in 1128 and was later granted two royal charters - by Henry VIII in 1539 and by Elizabeth I in 1584.

The school's main buildings and playing fields are located in the Lexden area of Colchester and there are around 950 pupils aged 11–18. Historically a boys' school, it has admitted girls to the sixth form since 1998 and specialises in science and languages. The school regularly tops national A-level league tables.

== History ==
=== Before 1900: foundation, royal charters and early history ===
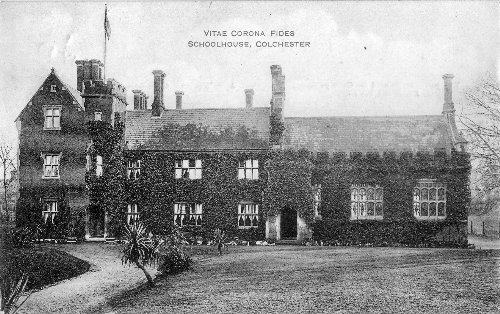
The main school building in about 1908.

Despite the paucity of mediaeval documentation, there is evidence to suggest that the school's origins can be traced back to 1206, and indeed earlier to 1132.

Several centuries later, following the dissolution of the monasteries by King Henry VIII, the royal charter of 1539 ensured that revenues were granted to the bailiffs and commonality of Colchester on condition that they founded a school; this was then enacted by the charter of Elizabeth I in 1585, on condition that at least £13 6s 8d be set aside annually for the schoolmaster. Revenue from other property was also granted, but this was later challenged in court during the reign of William III, and the arrangements were legally reconfirmed. By 1750, under the stewardship of Philip Morant, these revenues were worth £45 per annum and provided scholarships for two boys to study at the University of Cambridge.

For most of its history, the school was small and run mainly out of the headmaster's house, with only minor changes until 1852 when the "big school" was built. At this time there was very little secondary education in northern Essex, and difficulties were exacerbated through friction between the headmaster of the school and the town's Corporation. Pupil numbers dropped, although the school took in a few "parlour boarders" to prepare for entry into the army or university.

=== Since 1900: new school buildings, uniform and other developments ===
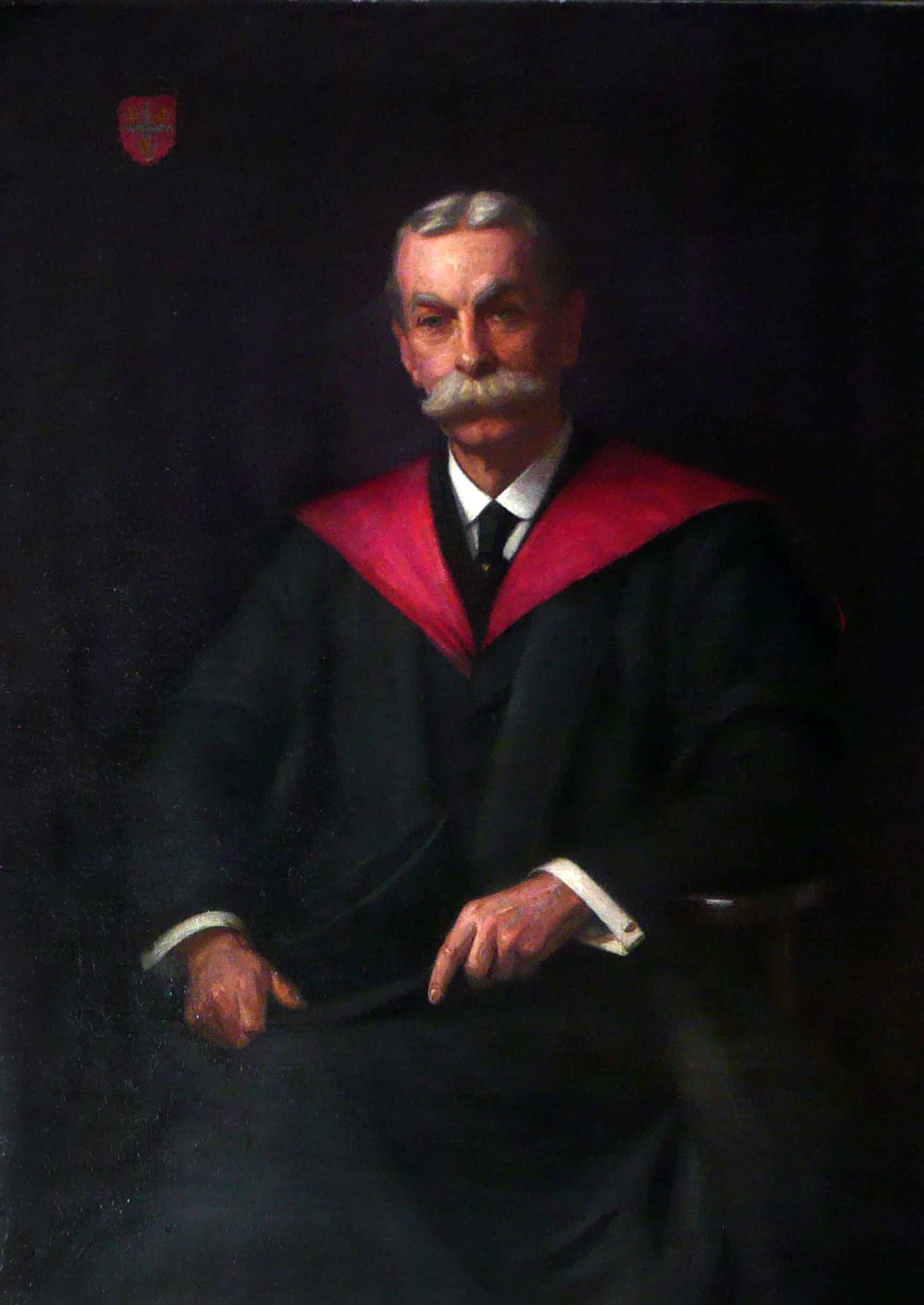
Percy Shaw Jeffrey in 1916.

The school's situation changed in 1900 with the appointment of Percy Shaw Jeffrey as headmaster. He took over a school with 29 boarders and barely any staff, but his reforms rapidly turned the school around. He introduced day boys and established a preparatory school, a cadet corps, an orchestra, a bugle band, school entertainments and theatrical performances. He was a pioneer of the teaching of modern European languages through phonetics, employing language teachers from France and Germany and setting up arrangements for foreign study during holidays.

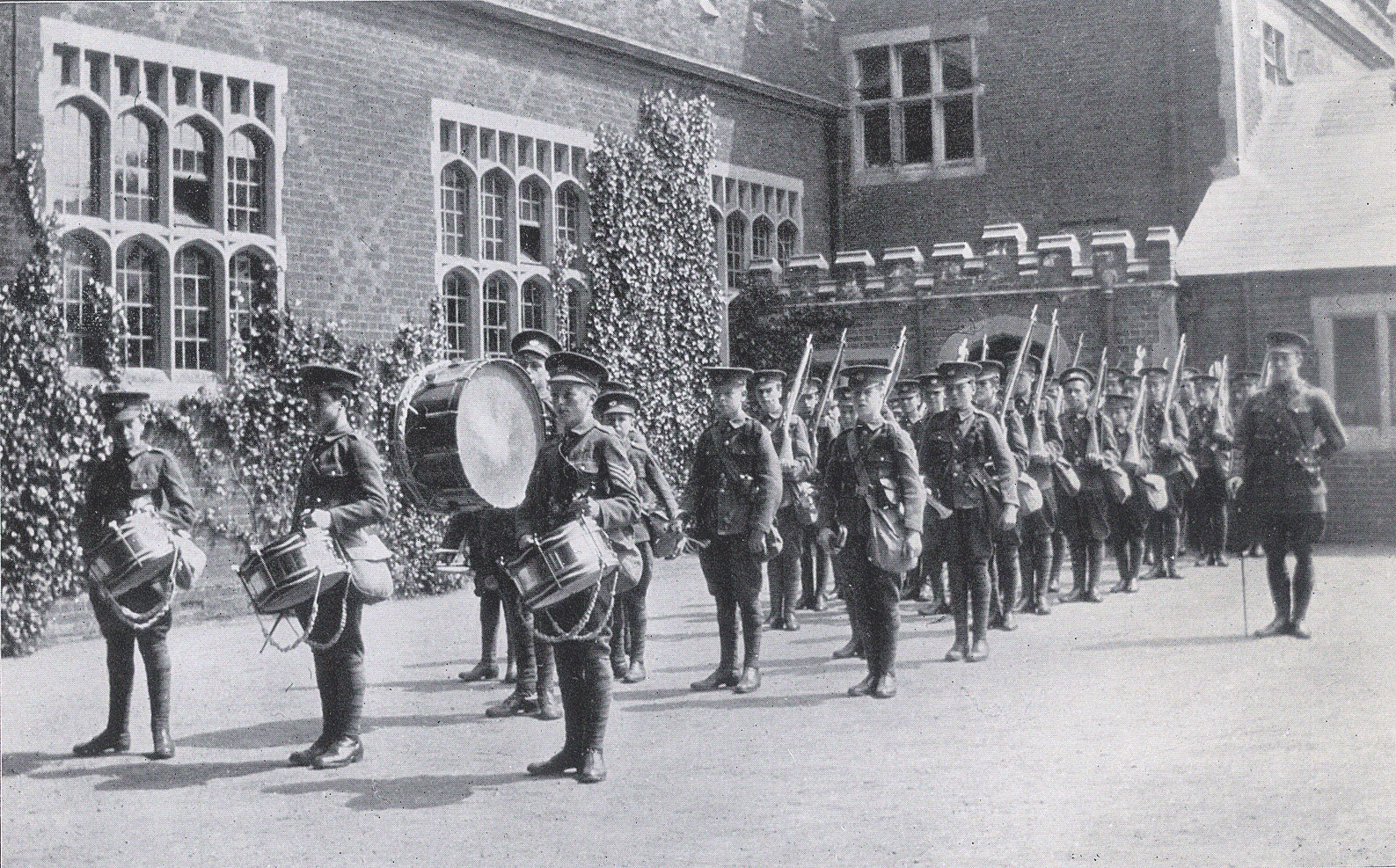
The school's cadet corps, July 1914.

The resulting academic success, scholarships and local goodwill enabled Shaw Jeffrey to expand the school buildings, inspired by the designs of local rivals, such as Ipswich School and Earls Colne Grammar School. First, Mansfield House was purchased in 1903 and renamed Gilberd House. In 1908 Shaw Jeffrey convinced the governors and local education board to build a new school building for £4,000 on land previously used as kitchen gardens. The new buildings were designed by architects Newman, Jacques and Round and were opened by Lord Rosebery, the former Prime Minister, in May 1910. In 1911 the school was given 12 acres (49,000 m^{2}) of playing fields and opened tennis courts and a small rifle range.

Until 1908 the school blazer was green, but other schools in the area had adopted the same colour. Wanting the school to be distinct and recognisable, Shaw Jeffrey approached a tailor and asked what the most expensive dye was. Told that it was purple, he chose it as the new colour for the school's blazer, which it remains to this day.

By 1912 numbers had grown to 144 pupils in the main school, split into four houses (School House, Parr's House (formerly North Town), Harsnett's House (formerly South Town) and Dugard's House), and 169 younger boys in the preparatory school.

Growth continued through the world wars, with 700 boys by 1947 and five scholarships for pupils to pursue university education. An outdoor swimming pool was constructed in the 1920s and remains in use. In 1966 Labour-controlled Colchester Borough Council put forward proposals to close Colchester Royal Grammar School and Colchester County High School and move to a comprehensive system, but this was rejected by Essex County Council. The educational expansion of the 1960s allowed the construction of new classrooms and a gymnasium.

Expansion continued into the 21st century, with a new art building opened in 2003 and the technology block upgraded. In 2006 a new extension to the science building was completed and two new chemistry laboratories were opened.

The school became grant-maintained in the 1980s and converted into an academy in 2012.

Following the launch of the Everyone's Invited website in 2020, allegations of misconduct were made by a former student of the school, which led to an inspection by Ofsted. The inspection found safeguarding to be ineffective and graded the school as "inadequate" overall. In February 2022, however, an Ofsted monitoring visit found that significant improvements had been made to the safeguarding and reporting processes, concluding that "safeguarding is effective" and that "pupils say school is a safe and enjoyable place to be".

== Buildings and facilities ==
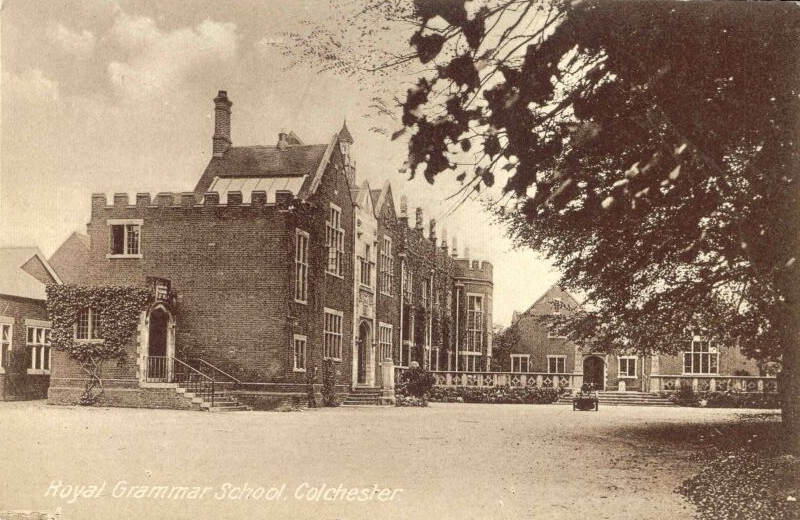
The school buildings in 1920.

The school's main site on Lexden road houses classrooms, science and technology facilities, school hall, library, gymnasium, cafeteria and offices. The site also contains: Gurney Benham House, acquired in 1934 and named after William Gurney Benham, a former pupil; Elyanore House, used for music teaching; the George Young building, named after a former English teacher and used for drama; and the Jenkinson Building (opened in 2016), named after a former headmaster and containing computer rooms and chemistry laboratories.

The school has male and female boarders who mainly come from overseas (mostly from Hong Kong and parts of the European Union).

== Academic situation ==
Being a selective school in the Consortium of Selective Schools in Essex, entrants are required to pass the eleven-plus exam.

The school has consistently achieved high results, coming first in the A-level league tables on many occasions. The school is also successful at GCSE level. In 2004 Colchester Royal Grammar School was named as the top state school in the country by the BBC.

The school's success was recognised in 1999 by the Prime Minister, Tony Blair, who invited the headmaster, Stewart Francis, along with other heads of the country's top schools, to a meeting to discuss the improvement of education in Britain.

In the early 2000s the headmaster Kenneth Jenkinson explained the success by saying that "although as a grammar school the academic success of our students is our principal priority, I tend to see the results as the by-product of an ethos where we encourage students to aim high in all that they do and approach challenges with confidence".

=== Classical Latin and Greek ===
The teaching of Classical Greek is offered to pupils, in addition to studying Latin, up to A-level. Between 1994 and 2004 the Government of Greece funded teaching of the subject in an effort to halt its decline in the United Kingdom state sector. This was the result of a pupil-led campaign following a decision by the governors to cease teaching of the subject following financial difficulties caused by becoming a grant-maintained school.

Colchester Royal Grammar School was also the first in the country to teach Classical Civilisation at A-Level. The subject "arose from a conversation between Arthur Brown, Head of Classics, and the Headmaster one afternoon in 1970."

== Headmasters ==
The following have served as headmaster of Colchester Royal Grammar School since 1900:

- 1900–1916: Percy Shaw Jeffrey
- 1916–1937: Harry James Cape
- 1937–1947: Arthur William Fletcher
- 1948–1968: Jack F. Elam
- 1968–1984: Stanley Gardner
- 1985–2000: Stewart A. C. Francis
- 2000–2015: Kenneth L. Jenkinson
- 2015–present: John Russell

For a full list, see: List of headmasters at Colchester Royal Grammar School.

== Old Colcestrians ==
Former pupils, known as "Old Colcestrians", include:

- James Acheson (b. 1946), costume designer
- George Biddell Airy (1801–1892), Astronomer Royal
- Mike Baker (1957–2012), BBC journalist
- Robert Barnard (1936−2013), crime writer
- Charles Benham (1860–1929), journalist and scientist
- William Gurney Benham (1859–1944), newspaper editor, author and Mayor of Colchester
- Andrew Blowers, geographer and environmentalist
- Tom Bradshaw (b. 1982), farmer and president of the NFU
- Laurie Bristow (b. 1963), diplomat
- Peter Currell Brown (b. 1936), novelist and anti-nuclear campaigner
- David Clary (b. 1953), theoretical chemist and president of Magdalen College, Oxford
- Tim Congdon (b. 1951), economist and government adviser on economic policy
- Benjamin Furley (1636–1714), Quaker merchant
- William Gilbert (1544–1603), physician and natural philosopher
- Charles Gray (1696–1782), lawyer and MP for Colchester
- Barry Gusterson (b. 1946), pathologist
- Samuel Harsnett (1561−1631), Archbishop of York and theologian
- Francis Hauksbee (1660–1713), natural philosopher and scientist
- Vic Keeble (1930–2018), footballer
- Richard Kemp (b. 1959), author and army officer
- Geoffrey Martin (1928–2007), historian and Keeper of Public Records
- Liam Neale (b. 1989), rugby union player
- Philip Nelson (b. 1952), acoustical engineer
- Matthew Newcomen (c. 1610–1669), nonconformist churchman
- Leonard Olyott (1926–2005), clergyman
- Robin Osborne (b. 1957), historian, author, Professor of Ancient History
- Jan Pinkava (b. 1963), film director and writer
- John Pluthero (b. 1964), businessman
- Bertram Ramsay (1883–1945), Royal Navy officer responsible for the Dunkirk evacuation
- Kenneth Riches (1908–1999), clergyman (Bishop of Dorchester)
- John Edgell Rickword (1898–1982), poet, writer and communist intellectual
- Michael Rosenthal (b. 1950), art historian
- William St Lawrence, 12th Baron Howth (1628–1671), Civil War Royalist and member of the Irish House of Lords
- Andrew Sanger (b. 1948), travel writer and journalist
- Gerry Sayer (1905–1942), test pilot
- William Ashwell Shenstone (1850–1908), chemist and schoolmaster
- David Smith (b. 1988), rugby union player
- Giles Smith (b. 1962), journalist
- John Sutherland (b. 1938), academic and writer
- Thomas Twining (1735–1804), clergyman and classical scholar
- John Went (b. 1944), clergyman (Bishop of Tewkesbury)
- Alfred Wright (1848−1909), clergyman
- Peter Wright (1934–2012), footballer
- Derek Wyatt (b. 1949), MP for Sittingbourne and Sheppey and rugby union player

== See also ==
- List of the oldest schools in the United Kingdom

== Sources ==
- Neil Brinded and Michael Green, They Stand Beside Us: The lives of the Old Colcestrians who died in the Second World War (2020)
- Trevor J. Hearn, The Gardens at Colchester Royal Grammar School (2014)
- Trevor J. Hearn, Vitae Corona Fides: The History of Colchester Royal Grammar School (2018)
- Laurie Holmes and Paul Ma, The Colcestrian: Colchester Royal Grammar School and the Great War (2014)
- Percy Shaw Jeffrey and William Gurney Benham, Some Chapters in the History of the Royal Grammar School, Colchester (1948)
- Geoffrey Martin, The History of Colchester Royal Grammar School, 1539–1947 (1947)
- Jonathan Spurrell (ed.), None Have Done Better: The lives of the Old Colcestrians who died in the First World War (2018)
