= Percy Shaw Jeffrey =

English academic and author (1862–1952)

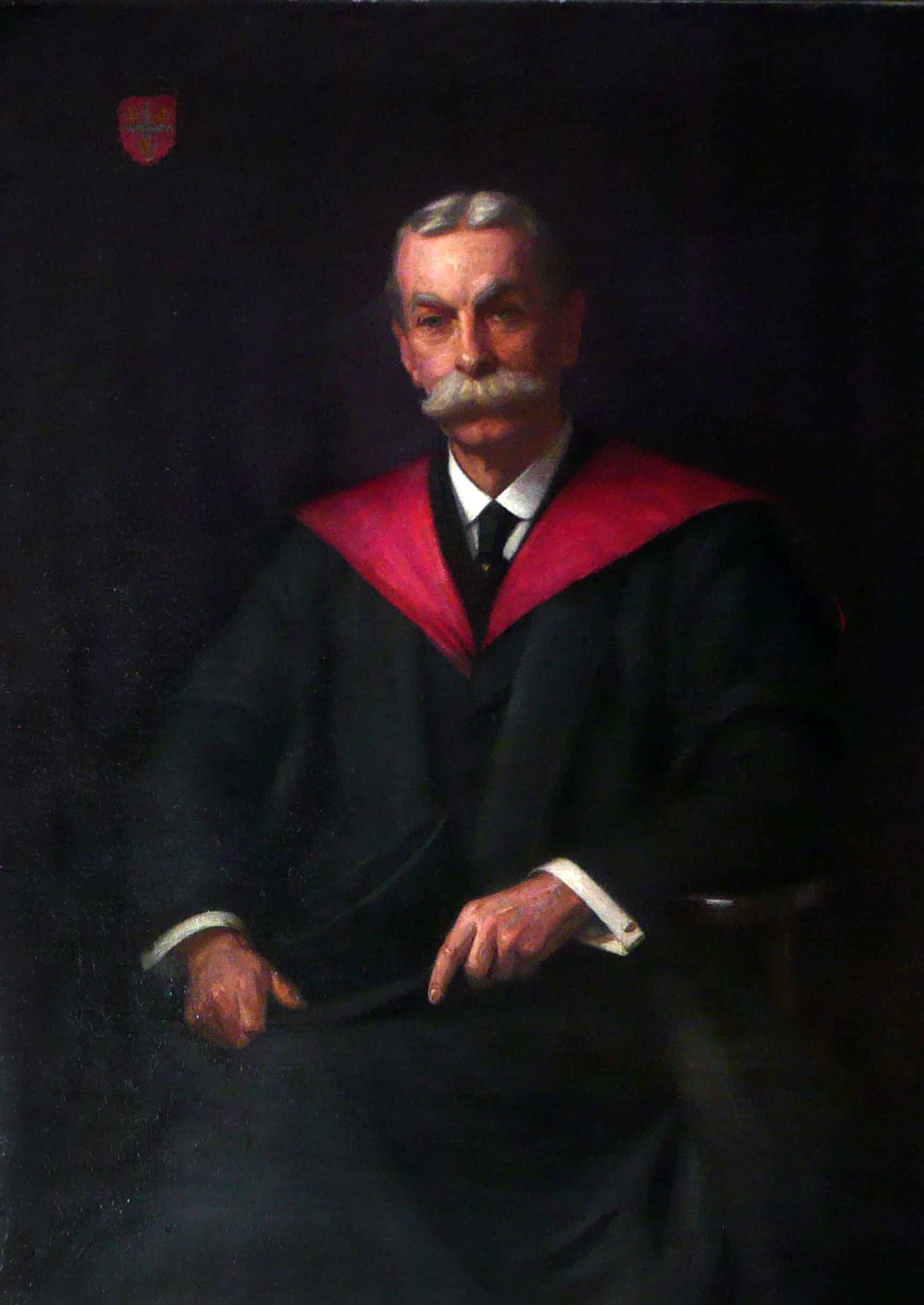
- Jeffrey in 1916
- Born: 14 March 1862; Cheltenham, Gloucestershire, United Kingdom
- Died: 22 February 1952 (aged 89)
- Occupation: Headmaster
- Known for: Schoolmaster, academic, author
- Title: Headmaster of Colchester Royal Grammar School
- Term: 1900–1916
- Predecessor: John Thomas
- Successor: Harry James Cape
- Spouse: Alice Clark (m. 1901–1952)

Percy Shaw Jeffrey FRGS (14 March 1862 Cheltenham, England – 22 February 1952) was an English schoolmaster and author of several books on a range of topics, including significant contributions towards the teaching of phonetics in schools. Shaw Jeffrey taught at a variety of schools before spending sixteen years as headmaster at Colchester Royal Grammar School. With his wife, Alice, he retired first to South Africa, then to the town of Whitby, North Yorkshire, in 1916, where he spent his time between numerous trips to countries around the world.

== Early life ==
Percy Shaw Jeffrey grew up with his parents, Thomas Ashby Jeffrey, a chemist, and Mary Helen Jeffrey (née Sparrow), in Cheltenham, Gloucestershire, and with his younger siblings Ada Constance, Russell Henry, Ethel Maude and Amy Louise. For three years from 1875, he attended Trent College, Long Eaton, where he rose to become "Head of the School, proxime accessit [runner up] for the Duke of Devonshire's Gold Medal, with first-class honours in the Cambridge Local, third in the list in Latin and distinguished in French".

== Early teaching career ==
Whilst reading for a maths scholarship at the University of Marburg, Shaw Jeffrey was offered the chance to work at Trent College, unofficially, as first the headmaster's private secretary, and then as a teacher. Unfortunately, he was unable to win the Marburg scholarship in 1881, and, left unemployed after the death of the Headmaster the year after, he took up a post as a junior master at Emanuel School, Wandsworth, soon after its move to new premises. On 30 January 1884, he matriculated into the University of Oxford as a member of The Queen's College, where he completed a Bachelor of Arts in 1887 and was granted his MA in 1890. He was disappointed to receive a degree with only third-class honours, however, and was advised to put any ambition of teaching on hold—advice which he did not follow.

After a brief spell teaching at Christ's College, Finchley, for six months during 1887, Shaw Jeffrey became an assistant mathematics and science master at The Skinners' School, Royal Tunbridge Wells, whilst simultaneously studying for an Inter Bachelor of Science, with first class honours. Whilst at Skinners' he published words he had written for the school song, set to music by Cuthbert H. Cronk, which persist to the present day. Although it was not his initial intention, in 1893 he took up a post as private tutor to a student he had been coaching at The Skinners' School and travelled to Florida with him.

Upon his return and owing to a shortage of officers, a short diversion from his teaching duties during 1893 saw Shaw Jeffrey join the Volunteer battalion of the Royal West Kent Regiment. Unable to afford a new uniform (then costing £80), after a change in regiment apparel to a much more popular red-with-light-blue colour scheme, he was forced to resign his commission later that year.

In 1894 he took up another post, this time to become a holiday modern-languages tutor (a well paid position) to the son of Sir Thomas and Lady Glen-Coats, Thomas Glen-Coats, later to compete at the 1908 Olympics. Putting his schoolmaster plans aside, he travelled with them to France, and the next year to Germany, where both enrolled at the University of Marburg. Once Glen-Coats was "safely... installed at Merton College, Oxford," Shaw Jeffrey returned to the university to study for a Phil.Doc., but, shortly before completing the degree in 1897, he was persuaded by the Dean of Queen's College to take up a position at Clifton College, Bristol.

== Headmaster at Colchester Royal Grammar School ==
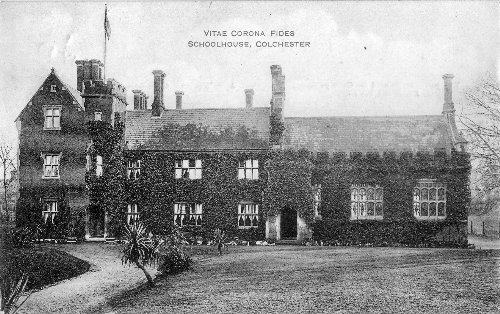
Colchester Royal Grammar School, circa 1908

Having been an assistant master at the Clifton College for three years, he was offered a position as headmaster at a new school which was to be founded in Argentina by the educationalist Michael Ernest Sadler, but could not get the funding to travel there, instead he assumed the role of headmaster at Colchester Royal Grammar School (known locally as CRGS). It is unclear exactly what date he can be said to have joined the school, because although agreement between the school and the governing legislature was reached in May 1899, the process of finding a new headmaster went on under the guidance of an interim one. Certainly, his official term as headmaster started on 1 September 1900 and by the end of 1900 he had already made his mark on the school—achievements included the introduction of a new school song, "Carmen Colcestriense", which used the same tune as, and a variation of the lyrics for, the school song of The Skinners' School. He retired his post as headmaster in 1916, but kept a lasting interest in the school.

During his 16-year stay at CRGS, student numbers increased from 29 to 180 boys under his guidance, particularly through the introduction of day pupils. Shaw Jeffrey is also credited with the introduction of many changes at the school, including the introduction of purple blazers, the setting up of the Old Colcestrian Society for former boys (and quite often honoured former masters), a preparatory school, a cadet corps, an orchestra, a bugle band and a series of school entertainments and theatrical performances, and the acquisition of several buildings on behalf of the school. He was a national pioneer of the teaching of modern European languages through phonetics, employed language teachers from Germany and France, and set up arrangements for foreign study during holidays.

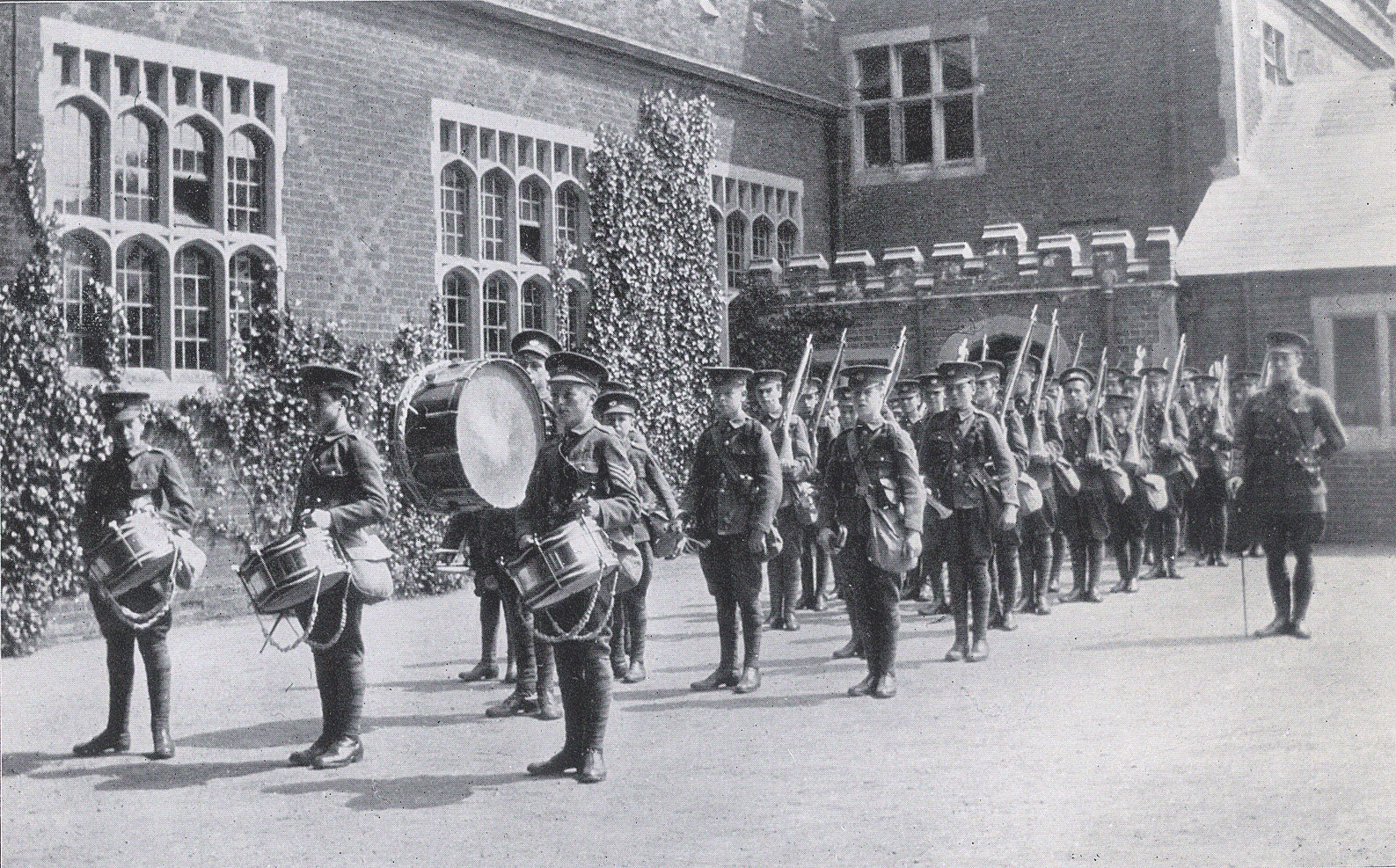
CRGS cadet corps, July 1914

Whilst at CRGS he founded the school magazine, The Colcestrian, designed to relay information about the school to students, ex-students and parents on a regular basis. This ran for over sixty consecutive years, and has recently been restarted in a similar style. Even after he left the school, he wrote into the magazine, adding his own memories, thoughts and opinions on articles of news published. He often signed himself off as "J", "an abbreviation that was and is commonly used in reference to him" throughout his time at CRGS and as synonymous with the man himself that it could be used for an article about his death in the local newspaper.

In recognition of his achievements at the school, a school house was named after him in 1950. The change from School House to Shaw Jeffrey's House completed a quartet that had featured three other notable headmasters of the school since Shaw Jeffrey himself introduced the four-house system in 1908. The house is still informally known by students as "J's". Another tribute, a painting of him by Frank Daniell, a Colchester artist, was presented to him on his retirement by the governors of CRGS and members of the Old Colcestrian Society and a replica was initially to be hung in the school hall; it was, however, the replica that was taken by Shaw Jeffrey and the original hung in the school, where it remains.

== Visits to Borley Rectory ==
Shaw Jeffrey was the first known witness of what was later deemed to be paranormal activity at Borley Rectory. In 1885 he spent time at the rectory with his friend Henry "Harry" Bull with whom he was studying at Oxford, during which he experienced "lots of small adventures at the Rectory. Stones falling about, my boots found on top of the wardrobe, etc." He also stated that he had seen the nun who was reputed to haunt the rectory several times and had often heard the ghostly coach during the night. In his view, however, the most striking of the phenomena, which he later recounted to the researcher and author on the subject Harry Price, was the loss of a French dictionary which was later thrown on the floor of his bedroom in the night.

Price regarded Shaw Jeffrey's testimonies as an "important contribution to the evidence for the early haunting of Borley Rectory", and used them in many of the studies which made the rectory famous in 1937. However, due to the time difference been events and their reporting over 50 years later, they have been challenged as unreliable.

== Publications ==
Shaw Jeffrey was particularly at home with modern languages, having become fluent in both French and German in the 1890s, and lectured on the topic and how it should be taught–phonetically, in his opinion. Later on, he authored more works relating to education, including the Work and Progress Record Book (Arnold) and The Schools of England (Ed. J. Burrow). He was also a contributor to the Argosy and other London periodicals, including the English Illustrated Magazine, Longmans and the Boy's Own Paper.

His first book, however, came with Useful Facts in Physiology (Educational Supply Association) in 1889. Later, having settled down at CRGS, he used his spare time to publish Elementary German Words and Phrases for Red Cross Workers and Elementary French Words and Phrases for Red Cross Workers (both Hachette) in 1914. They were endorsed by Queen Alexandra and spawned over 50,000 copies. Over the course of his life he adapted and authored several foreign-language works for English audiences, namely:

- The Study of Colloquial and Literary French, With notes on the present state of modern language teaching, etc. A joint work with his professor at the University of Marburg, Eduard Koschwitz;
- Ausgewaelte Marchen (Published 1902, by Whittaker), an adaptation of a story from Ludwig Bechstein's Deutsches Märchenbuch, with added introduction and notes.
- Au Pôle en ballon from the French original by Victor Patrice;
- Poucinet. (Conte finlandais) from the French original by Édouard René and Lefebvre Laboulaye.
- Short passages for translation into French and German (Oxford University Press)

In 1923 he published another non-fiction book, Whitby Lore and Legend, having retired to Whitby via South Africa. A Schoolmaster's Apologia: Memories of Eighty Years was his collection of memoirs, published by Abbey Press, Whitby, in 1948. His time at CRGS is documented in his 1948 collaboration, Some Chapters in the History of the Royal Grammar School Colchester, with the one time Mayor of Colchester, Sir William Gurney Benham, who was a personal friend of Shaw Jeffrey and first president of the Old Colcestrian Society.

After retirement, Shaw Jeffrey could also give time to his love of travelling, and authored a number of related titles. Round the World with an Empress and Round the world with the 'Empress of Britain' (both Ed. J. Burrow) were accounts of the trips he made while lecturing on board the liners of Canadian Pacific Railway during the British winter; a series dubbed The Little Travel Books (Horne) documented others of his travels, and grew out of articles he wrote for the Whitby Gazette. They included:

- Black and White in South Africa
- Sunshine on the Waters (Australia and New Zealand)
- Eastward to the Cape
- Sidelights-South African Roundabout
- Third Time Lucky (South Africa)
- Columbus Calling (West Indies)

A selection of these books he later sent to Princess Elizabeth and Princess Margaret, who were said to have enjoyed them.

== Later life and death ==
On 13 August 1901, only shortly after becoming headmaster at CRGS, Shaw Jeffrey married his wife Alice, whom he had met on a Mediterranean cruise, and who stayed at the school throughout his time there. On his retirement, they moved to South Africa, where he did "valuable works on the Press for the Allied cause". From 1914 onwards they also had possession of Whitby's Bagdale Old Hall, built in 1530, as a residence, and eventually took residence there on his return from South Africa, though they were often away travelling.

Despite retirement from any sort of career, Shaw Jeffrey maintained that he "had no intention of leading an idle life" and was variously an inspector and examiner for both the University of Cambridge and the University of London and an assessor for all of Cambridge's French papers for five years after the introduction of the higher certificate. He was also an occasional inspector in modern languages for the Board of Education and deputised as professor of French at the University of Durham while the professor himself was incapacitated due to illness. He was an assessor of all modern language papers set at Durham for five years. He continued to fill in positions inspecting in Spanish and Italian, despite only having learned the languages during his travels.

Although he spent barely 10 or 12 weeks in any one year in Whitby, he was still attached to it. Shortly before his death he published A Haunt of Ancient Peace, a history of Bagdale Old Hall (with Sir D'Arcy Power, KBE), and also made several large donations: £3000 to Whitby Parish Church, £2000 to the museum and £500 to the Whitby Literary and Philosophy Society.

Shaw Jeffrey died on 22 February 1952, leaving Alice as a widow. The couple had just celebrated their golden wedding anniversary, a fact reported in the Essex County Standard, along with a short obituary, and an overview of the latest Old Colcestrian annual meeting (held only a day after his death), at which a variety of tributes had been paid. The article describes him as "one of Colchester's most famous headmasters" and one with "tons of personality". His death was particularly poignant for members of CRGS, for it came two days before a World War Two war memorial, for which he and his wife had contributed the majority of the money, was to be unveiled and dedicated. On her death, his wife left their house in Whitby to the Whitby Literary and Philosophy Society, though efforts to turn it into a museum were ultimately unsuccessful.
