= Samuel Harsnett =

Archbishop of York from 1629 to 1631

The Most Reverend and Right Honourable Samuel Harsnett
- Archbishop of York
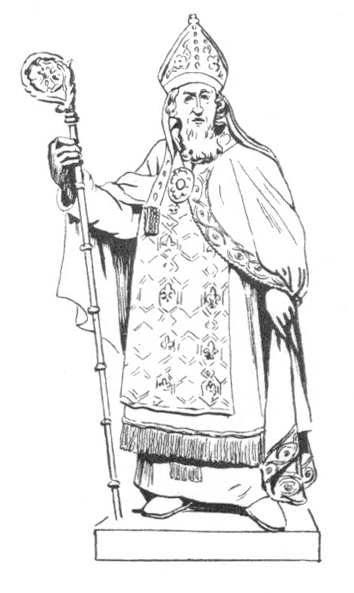
- Province: Province of York
- Diocese: Diocese of York
- Installed: 1629
- Term ended: 1631
- Predecessor: George Montaigne
- Successor: Richard Neile
- Other posts: Bishop of Chichester (1609–1619); Bishop of Norwich (1619–1628)

Orders
- Ordination: 1583

Personal details
- Born: Samuel Halsnoth; June 1561 Colchester, Essex
- Died: 25 May 1631 (aged 69) Moreton-in-Marsh, Gloucestershire
- Buried: St Mary's Church, Chigwell
- Denomination: Anglicanism
- Parents: William & Agnes Halsnoth
- Spouse: Thomasine Harsnett
- Children: Thomasine Harsnett
- Education: Pembroke College, Cambridge

Samuel Harsnett (or Harsnet) (June 1561 – May 1631), born Samuel Halsnoth, was an English writer on religion and Archbishop of York from 1629.

== Early life ==
Born in St Botolph's parish, Colchester, Essex, the son of William Halsnoth, a baker, and his wife Agnes, Harsnett was probably educated at Colchester's free school, now Colchester Royal Grammar School. After leaving school, he entered King's College, Cambridge as a sizar on 8 September 1576 and removed into Pembroke Hall where he gained a BA in 1580/1 and was elected a Fellow on 27 November 1583. In 1583 he was ordained into the Church of England, where he was soon disciplined by Archbishop Whitgift for preaching against predestination at St Paul's Cross on 27 October 1584. As David Hughson notes, "he was one of those divines who opposed the decrees of the synod of Dort and he wrote a very learned treatise against absolute predestination". In 1584 he proceeded Master of Arts by seniority.

== Academic career ==
In March 1587 Harsnett became headmaster of Colchester Royal Grammar School. In recognition of his achievements, the school has had, since 1908, a school house bearing his name. Preferring his studies at Cambridge University to the position, he resigned his office in November 1588, disliking the "painful trade of teaching", and returned to Pembroke Hall where he studied divinity, gaining his BD c.1590.

He re-entered himself into Pembroke Hall, where he was first a fellow and was elected master on 1 November 1605, remaining in that position until 1616, when he resigned because accusations totalling fifty-seven articles were made against him, by the Fellows of Pembroke to King James I. He was also Vice-Chancellor of Cambridge University for the years 1606, the same year he gained his Doctor of Divinity degree, and 1614.

== Ministerial career ==
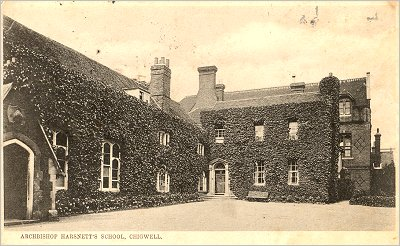
Chigwell School, which Harsnett founded, circa 1904

In 1592 he served the office of Junior Proctor and five years later became chaplain to Richard Bancroft, then Bishop of London and shortly to become Archbishop of Canterbury by whose favour he quickly rose through the ranks. On the authority of Bancroft, he obtained the rectory of St Margaret, New Fish Street, London which he resigned in 1604 and the vicarage of Chigwell in Essex on 14 June 1597 which he resigned in 1605. Whilst at Chigwell, his wife, Thomazine, died in 1601, having given birth in 1600 to a short-lived daughter. Even after 1605 he continued to reside at Chigwell, where he had purchased a house and estate. In 1619 he purchased land in the parish on which he founded both a Latin school (which survives as Chigwell School) and an English school in 1629.

In 1598 he was promoted, becoming the prebendary of Mapesbury on 5 August and on 17 January 1602 the archdeacon of Essex – both posts chosen for him by Bishop Bancroft. On 16 April 1604 Sir Thomas Lucas of Colchester, father of Charles Lucas, installed him in the rectory of Shenfield, Essex.

Having been Bishop of Chichester since 13 November 1609, on 8 August 1619, he became Bishop of Norwich, resigning the living of Stisted he had held since 1609. He spent most of his time when absent from his city at the bishop's palace in Ludham, which he rebuilt after a fire and consecrated a chapel for divine worship. In May 1624 he was charged before Parliament with high-handedness by the citizens of Norwich and in that same year he also persecuted the Puritans in Great Yarmouth, leading to a complaint by them to King Charles I in 1627.

On 26 November 1628, he was elected Archbishop of York, and on 10 November 1629 he was sworn a Privy Councillor.

== Death and commemoration ==
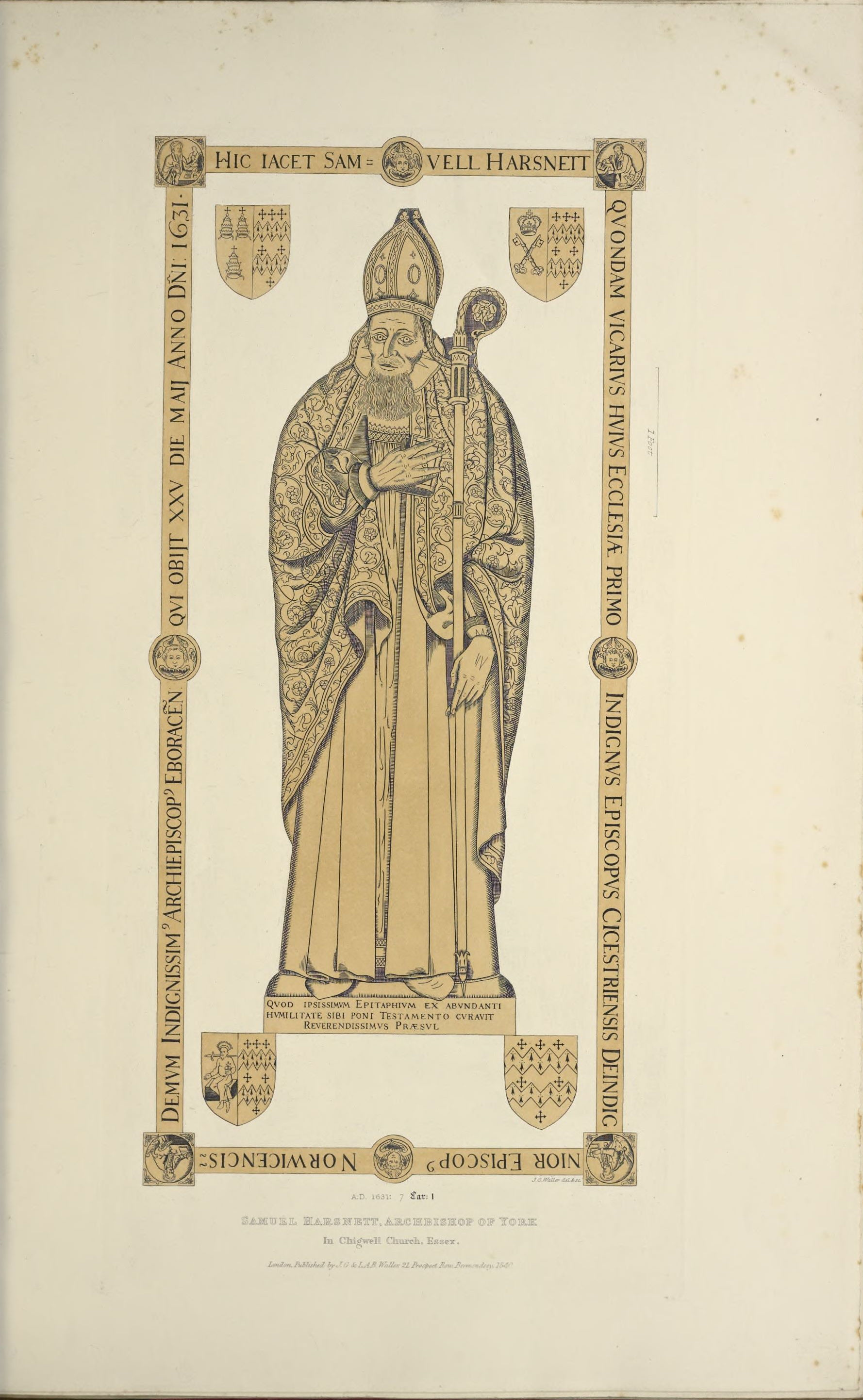
Print (1840) of the memorial brass to Samuel Harsnett in St Mary's Church, Chigwell

Towards the end of his life he fell ill, signing his will on 13 February 1631, to which he signed a codicil on 18 May, and taking the waters at Bath in April of that year. He died at Moreton-in-Marsh while returning from Bath on 25 May 1631 and his body took ten days to return to Chigwell. He was buried at St Mary's Church, Chigwell alongside his wife and daughter, both named Thomasine who had both died in 1601. A memorial brass of Harsnett can be found in St Mary's Church, Chigwell, although it has been moved from its original position over his grave. The image on the brass is believed to be a true representation of him and he most likely sat for it shortly before his death. It has been suggested that it is of Flemish origin but, because of the similarities it bears to the brass of Edward Filmer in St Peter's and St Paul's Church, East Sutton, Kent, it is now believed to be by Edward Marshall. His epitaph on the brass reads:

Hic iacet Samuell Harsnett quondam vicarius huius ecclesiæ primo indignus episcopus Cicestrensis deindignior Norwicencis demum indignissim' archiepiscop' Eboraceñ qui obiit XXV die maii anno dñi: 1631
Here lies Samuel Harsnett once vicar of this church, first unworthy bishop of Chichester, then more unworthy bishop of Norwich, finally most unworthy archbishop of York; he died on the 25th day in May in the year of our Lord 1631.

There are two changes from the inscription he requested in his will – his name is spelt as "Samuell", not "Samuel" and "deindignior" should have been "dein indignior".

In his home town of Colchester he is commemorated by a statue on the town hall and a stained-glass window in St Botolph's Church.

His collection of books was bequeathed to the borough of Colchester for the use of local clergy. Harsnett's library now comprises 839 volumes with 20 incunabula and is in the Albert Sloman Library of the University of Essex.

== Religious views ==
Harsnett is noted for his sceptical attitude towards demons and witchcraft. As the chaplain to Bishop Bancroft, Harsnett was commissioned to write a treatise condemning the 1590s exorcisms of John Darrell, having sat on the 1598 commissions which investigated his activities. Darrell, curate at St Mary's Church, Nottingham was a puritan minister who performed a series of public exorcisms in the English Midlands. Eventually, the exorcisms caused such a disturbance that they attracted the attention of Anglican authorities in London. Harsnett's A Discovery of the Fraudulent Practises of John Darrel (1599) was a polemical piece intended to discredit Darrell's puritan agenda. It was drafted as a piece of political propaganda, but it also genuinely questioned the belief in demons. In this way, Harsnett sought natural explanations for supposedly supernatural phenomena.

In 1603, he wrote another book, A Declaration of Egregious Popish Impostures, published by order of the Privy Council, which condemned exorcisms performed by Roman Catholic priests in the 1580s. Shakespeare used this book as a source, pulling words and phrases when writing the play King Lear, mainly spoken by Edgar while he feigns madness, and John Milton is said to have been influenced by it when writing L'Allegro.

As a member of England's religious authority, Harsnett's sceptical attitudes, divided equally between puritanism and popery, set important precedents for English policy. For example, by coming close "to denying the reality of witchcraft" he may have contributed to the relative lack of witch hunts in England, compared to other countries.

Harsnett was a strident anti-Calvinist. The extent of his Arminian theology has been discussed by historians.

== Writings ==
Harsnett is known to have written eight works, which are as follows:

- Nemo necessario damnatur, a treatise written against Calvinism, which may have been his BD thesis;
- De Necessitate baptismi;
- Sermon against predestination, on the text of Ezekiel chapter 33, verse 11; preached at St Paul's Cross in 1584;
- A Discovery of the Fraudulent practises of Iohn Darrel, Bacheler of Artes, in his proceedings concerning the Pretended Possession and dispossession of William Somers at Nottingham; of Thomas Darling, the boy of Burton at Caldwell; and of Katherine Wright at Mansfield, & Whittlington; and of his dealings with one Mary Couper at Nottingham, detecting in some sort the deceitfull trade in these latter dayes of casting out Deuils, London, John Wolfe, 1599;
- A Declaration of egregious Popish Impostures, to with-draw the harts of her Maiesties Subiects from their allegeance, and from the truth of Christian Religion professed in England, under the pretence of casting out deuils. Pracised by Edmunds, alias Weston a Iesuit, and diuers Romish Priests his wicked associates. Whereunto are annexed the Copies of the Confessions, and Examinations of the parties themselves, taken upon oath before her Maiesties Commissioners, for causes Ecclesiasticall, James Roberts, Barbican, 1603; with a new title pages, London, 1605;
- Defence of Answer against a certain Reply concerning Usury, dated after 1604;
- Consideration of the better settling of Church government, presented by Laud to the King, and sent by the King to the Archbishop of Canterbury in December 1629;
- Instructions concerning certain articles to be observed and put in execution by the several Bishops in his Province, Lambeth Library.

== Arms ==
Coat of arms of Samuel Harsnett

Notes
While Harsnett was serving as a bishop his arms would have been displayed impaled with the arms of the diocese and topped by a mitre.
Escutcheon
Azure two bars dancette Ermine between six crosslets three two and one Or.

== Notes and references ==
=== Sources ===
- Harris, Tim (2014). Rebellion: Britain's First Stuart Kings, 1567–1642. Oxford: Oxford University Press.
- Pearce, Michael (2004). The career and works of Samuel Harsnett, Archbishop of York (DPhil thesis). Oxford: University of Oxford.

Academic offices
Preceded by Lancelot Andrewes	Master of Pembroke College, Cambridge; 1605–1616	Succeeded by Nicholas Felton
Church of England titles
Preceded by Lancelot Andrewes	Bishop of Chichester; 1609–1619	Succeeded by George Carleton
Preceded by John Overall	Bishop of Norwich; 1619–1628	Succeeded by Francis White
Preceded by George Montaigne	Archbishop of York; 1629–1631	Succeeded by Richard Neile
