= Liam Neale =

English rugby union player (born 1989)

Liam Neale (born 14 October 1989 (age 37)) is an English rugby union player, who played as openside flanker for Northampton Saints.
