= Harriet King (poet) =

English poet and devotional writer

Harriet Eleanor Baillie-Hamilton King
- Born: Harriet Eleanor Baillie-Hamilton; 1840 Edinburgh, Scotland
- Died: 1920 (aged 79–80)
- Occupation: Poet, devotional writer
- Period: Late Victorian
- Genre: Poetry, devotional literature
- Spouse: Henry Samuel King (m. 1864; died 1878)
- Parents: W. A. Baillie Hamilton (father) Lady Harriet Hamilton (mother)
- Relatives: Duke of Abercorn (uncle)

Harriet Eleanor Baillie-Hamilton King (Mrs. Hamilton King) (1840–1920) was an English poet and devotional writer.

== Life ==
King was born in Edinburgh and was the daughter of Admiral W. A. Baillie Hamilton and Lady Harriet Hamilton, sister of the Duke of Abercorn. In 1864, she married banker and publisher Henry Samuel King. She lived at the Manor House, Chigwell, Essex, all her married life, but after her husband's death in 1878 she moved with her children to another part of the country. Her strong sympathy for Mazzini, and the cause of Italian unification inspired a number of her works. She was received into the Roman Catholic Church in 1890 by Cardinal Henry Edward Manning.

== Works ==
- Aspromonte and Other Poems (1869)
- The Disciples (1873)
- A Book of Dreams (1883)
- The Sermon in the Hospital (from The Disciples) (1885)
- Ballads of the North and Other Poems (1889)
- The Prophecy of Westminster and Other Poems: in Honour of Henry Edward, Cardinal Manning (1895)
- The Hours of the Passion and Other Poems (1902)
- Letters and Recollections of Mazzini (1912)
