= Chigwell =

Town in Essex, England

Coordinates: 51.6225°N 0.07227°E

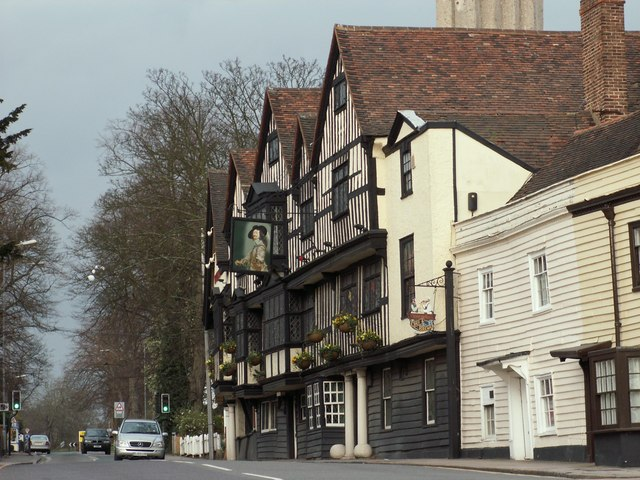
- The former Olde King's Head

- Location within Essex
- Interactive map of Chigwell
- Area: 15.68 km^{2} (6.05 sq mi)
- Population: 14,599 (Parish, 2021); 12,250 (Built up area, 2021)
  - Density: 931/km^{2} (2,410/sq mi)
- OS grid reference: TQ435935
  - London: 12 mi (19 km) SW
- Civil parish: Chigwell
- District: Epping Forest
- Shire county: Essex
- Region: East
- Country: England
- Sovereign state: United Kingdom
- Post town: CHIGWELL
- Postcode district: IG7
- Dialling code: 020
- Police: Essex
- Fire: Essex
- Ambulance: East of England
- UK Parliament: Epping Forest
- Website: Chigwell Parish Council

Chigwell is a town and civil parish in the Epping Forest District of Essex, England. It lies adjacent to the northern boundary of Greater London. It is on the Central line of the London Underground. At the 2021 census the parish had a population of 14,599 and the built up area had a population of 12,250.

== History ==
The manor of Chigwell was held by Earl Harold under Edward the Confessor. From the 1550s it was the property of the Hicks Beach family.

The parish church of St Mary the Virgin dates back to the 12th century and is a Grade II* listed building. Opposite the church is the Kings Head Hotel, a 17th century coaching inn.

=== Toponymy ===
According to P. H. Reaney's Place-Names of Essex the name means 'Cicca's well', Cicca being an Anglo-Saxon personal name. In medieval sources the name appears with a variety of spellings including "Cinghe uuella" and Chikewelle". Folk etymology has sought to derive the name from a lost "king's well", supposed to have been to the south-east of the parish near the border of what is now the London Borough of Redbridge. There were several medicinal springs in Chigwell Row documented by Miller Christy in his book History of the mineral waters and medicinal springs of the county of Essex, published in 1910. The 18th-century historian Nathaniel Salmon stated that the "-well" element in the name derives from Anglo-Saxon weald (wood).

The land registration map of Redbridge Council shows "Chig Well (site of)" as being located to the rear of the house located at 67 Brocket Way, Chigwell.

=== Economic development ===
Traditionally a rural farming community, but now largely suburban, Chigwell was mentioned in the Domesday Book of 1086. It is referred to by Charles Dickens in his novel Barnaby Rudge: A Tale of the Riots of 'Eighty; the Maypole Inn is based on the King's Head inn, though the name was taken from the Maypole public house in Chigwell Row. It is likely Dickens was aware of both hostelries, since he frequently visited Chigwell, which he described in a letter to John Forster as "the greatest place in the world ... Such a delicious old inn opposite the churchyard ... such beautiful forest scenery ... such an out of the way rural place...".

=== RAF Chigwell ===
From 1933 to 1958 there was an RAF presence at Roding Valley Meadows (near what is now the David Lloyd Leisure Centre). It served first to provide barrage balloon protection during the Second World War and was involved in the rollout of Britain's coastal nuclear early warning system during the Cold War. In 1953 it briefly housed the RAF contingent taking part in the Coronation celebrations. Some of the RAF Chigwell site is now part of the Local Nature Reserve, Roding Valley Meadows LNR.

== Geography ==
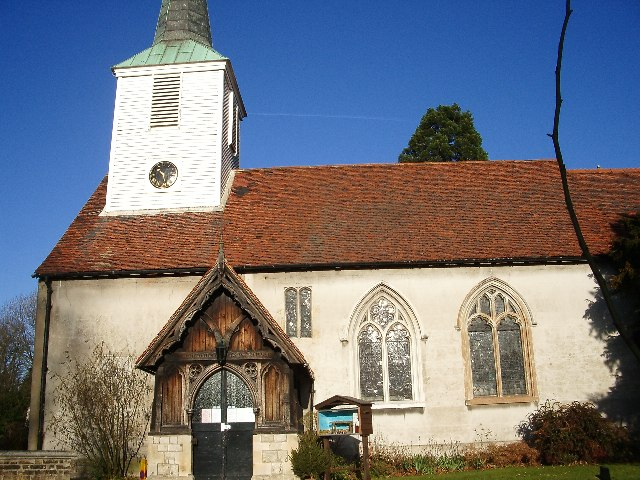
St Mary's Church, Chigwell

The hamlet of Chigwell Row lies towards the east of Chigwell, near Lambourne; this part of the parish is well forested and mostly rural. Grange Hill is the area around the junction of Manor Road and Fencepiece Road/Hainault Road, extending as far as the boundary with Redbridge including the Limes Farm estate. Chigwell has a population of around 17,500 and is generally considered a wealthy area, characterised by large suburban houses, notably in Manor Road, Hainault Road and Chigwell High Road, which featured in the popular English situation comedy Birds of a Feather (although many of the outside locations used in that programme were not in Chigwell).

== Governance ==
There are three tiers of local government covering Chigwell, at parish, district and county level: Chigwell Parish Council, Epping Forest District Council, and Essex County Council. The parish council has its offices on Hainault Road.

=== Administrative history ===
Chigwell was an ancient parish in the Ongar hundred of Essex. As well as the village itself, the parish also included Buckhurst Hill and Chigwell Row. Buckhurst Hill had a chapel of ease from 1837 and became a separate ecclesiastical parish from 1867, but remained part of the civil parish of Chigwell until 1894.

When elected parish and district councils were established under the Local Government Act 1894, it was decided that the more developed Buckhurst Hill west of the River Roding and the more rural part of Chigwell parish east of the Roding needed to be administered separately. The old parish was therefore split along the river, with Buckhurst Hill being removed from the parish of Chigwell to become its own urban district. The reduced parish of Chigwell east of the river was given a parish council and included in the Epping Rural District.

In 1933, the parish of Chigwell and the neighbouring Buckhurst Hill Urban District and Loughton Urban District were united into the Chigwell Urban District. Chigwell continued to form a civil parish after the 1933 reforms, but as an urban parish it was ineligible to have a parish council; the lowest elected tier of local government between 1933 and 1974 was Chigwell Urban District Council.

When Greater London was created in 1965 a small, more densely populated section at the south-eastern end of Chigwell parish was transferred to the London Borough of Redbridge; this area is now known as the Manford estate. Despite the transfer to Greater London, it retains Chigwell postal addresses.

Chigwell Urban District was abolished in 1974 when the area became part of the new Epping Forest District. The area of the former Chigwell Urban District became unparished as a result of the 1974 reforms. In 1996, three new civil parishes were created covering the area of the pre-1974 Chigwell Urban District: Buckhurst Hill, Chigwell, and Loughton.

== Education ==
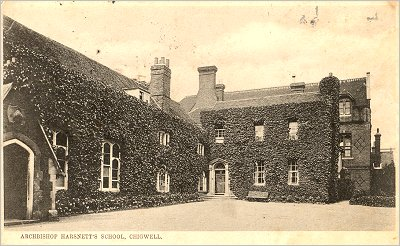
Chigwell School c. 1904

Schools in the area include Chigwell Primary Academy, Limes Farm Infants School & Nursery, Limes Farm Junior School, Guru Gobind Singh Khalsa College, West Hatch High School and Chigwell School, a private school, which was founded from a bequest by Samuel Harsnett, Archbishop of York, in 1629, among whose past pupils are William Penn, who later went on to found Pennsylvania, and actor Sir Ian Holm. The diarist John Aubrey recorded that it was at Chigwell School that Penn had a mystical vision, which influenced his later conversion to Quakerism. The original 17th-century schoolroom where Penn was taught still stands, and is now the school library.

== Culture ==
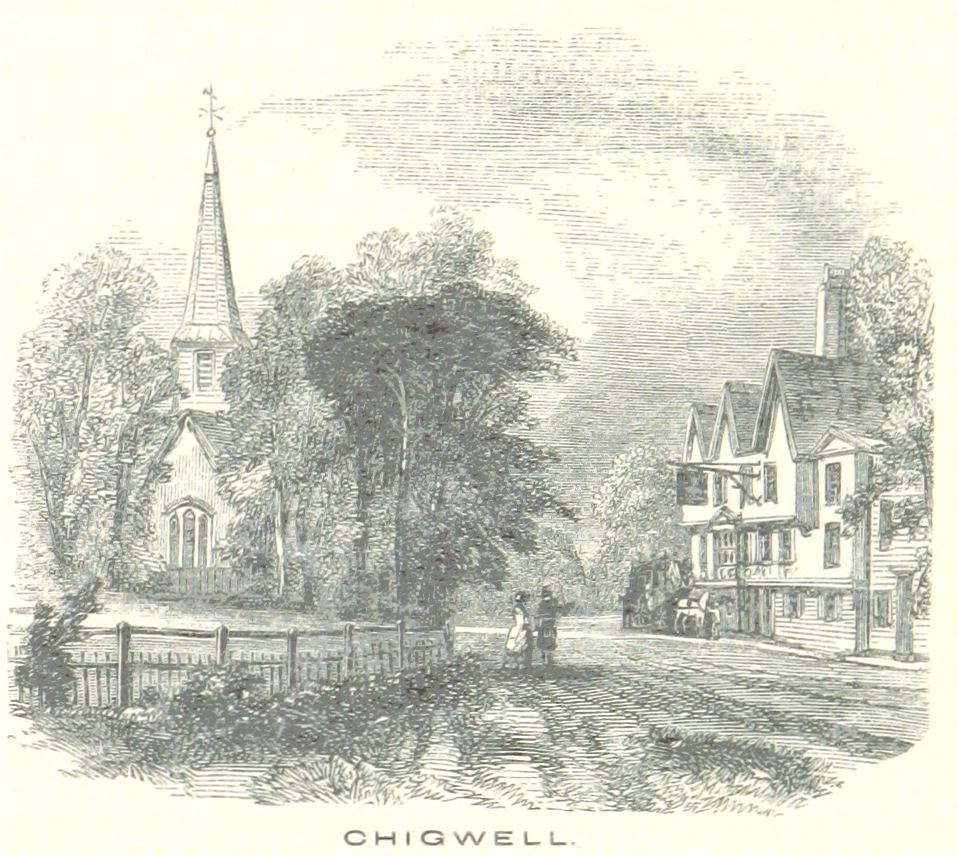
Ye Olde King's Head and St Mary's Church, depicted in 1851

Tottenham Hotspur Football Club had its training facilities in the area until May 2012, when it moved to a new facility in Enfield, northeast London. Leyton Orient Football Club also have a training ground in Chigwell, adjacent to Chigwell School's fields.

A David Lloyd Leisure Centre, situated off Roding Road by the M11 motorway, contains indoor and outdoor tennis courts, swimming pools and gymnasium. Also in the area are a Holmes Place Health Club, Topgolf playing Centre and Chigwell Golf Club. Chigwell Cricket Club is based at the Old Chigwellians Club in Roding Lane. Chigwell also plays host to the Old Loughtonians Hockey Club.

There are two pubs, the King William IV and the Two Brewers.

Ye Olde King's Head, which was operated as a pub until 2011, is said to be the Maypole Inn in Dickens' Barnaby Rudge. The building was subsequently sold to local resident Lord Sugar's property company Amsprop which now leases the Grade II* Listed building to the Sheesh Turkish restaurant.

Until their closure in 2002, Chigwell had night clubs, known collectively as the Epping Forest Country Club. There is a Local Nature Reserve at Roding Valley Meadows off Roding Lane which follows the River Roding up to Loughton.

The TV series Birds of a Feather was set in Chigwell.

== Transport ==
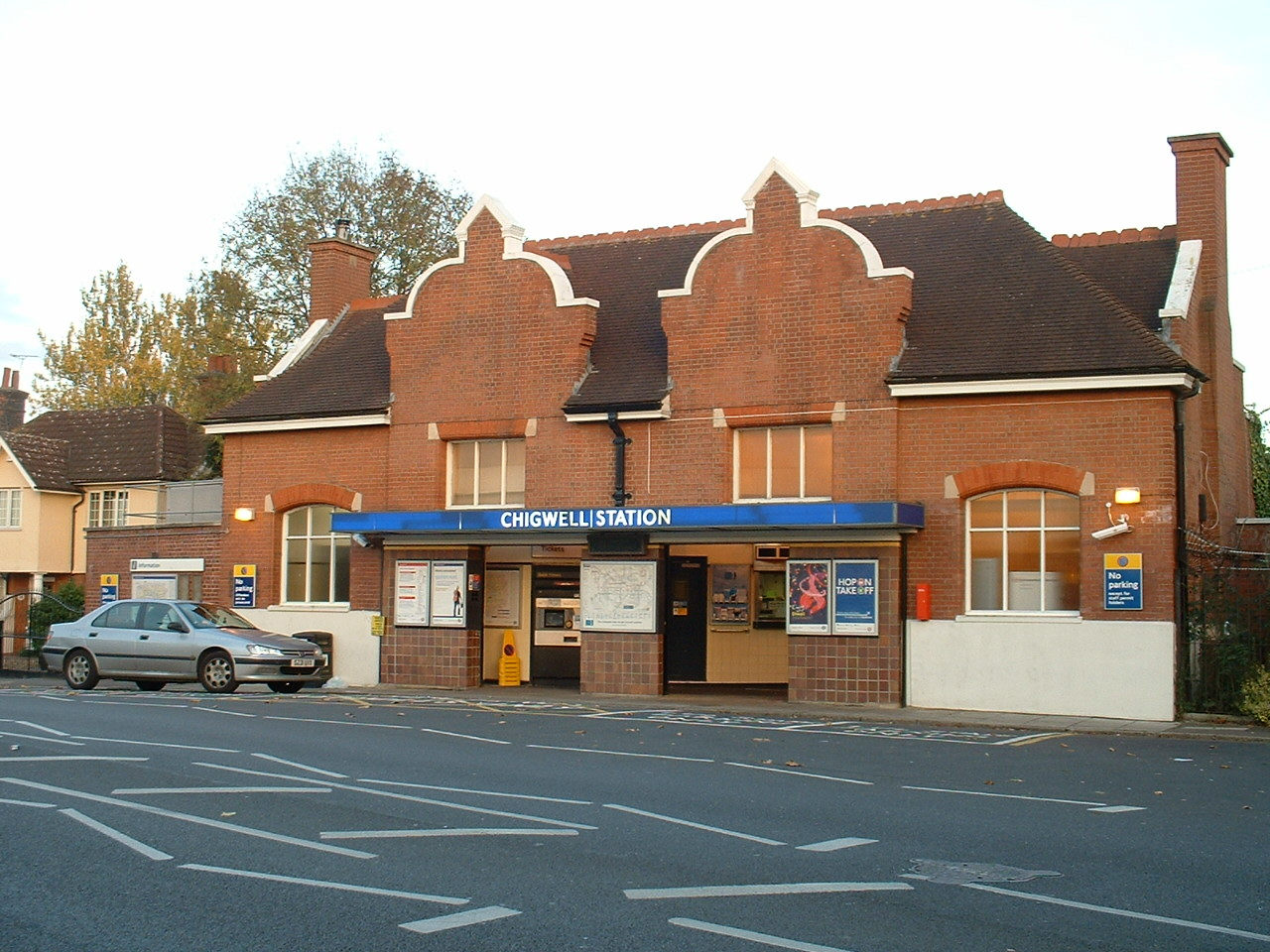
Chigwell Station, opened 1903 by the Great Eastern Railway

All bus services are Transport for London services, except the 804. Route 150 just penetrates into Chigwell Row. Routes 362 and 462 serve only Grange Hill. Route 275 just passes through Tomswood Hill and the westernmost section of Manor Road. Chigwell is served by Chigwell station and Grange Hill station (further south bordering Hainault), both on the Central line of the London Underground. For a more frequent service to London there are also nearby Buckhurst Hill, Woodford, Loughton and Hainault stations as services between Grange Hill and Woodford are limited to three trains per hour in each direction, with an increased service during morning peak hours.

== Notable people ==
- Thomas Edwards, recipient of the Victoria Cross for actions at the Battle of Tamai, is buried in the churchyard of St Mary's.
- Joey Essex television personality.
- Dave Gahan singer, member of group Depeche Mode born in Chigwell.
- Sally Gunnell, athlete, pupil at West Hatch High School
- Admiral Sir Eliab Harvey, Royal Navy officer, lived at Rolls (demolished 1953)
- Simon Harris, music producer
- Geoff Hurst, member of 1966 FIFA World Cup-winning team, also lived in the town while at West Ham United
- Scott Kashket (born 1996), England, striker for Wycombe Wanderers
- Harriet King, Victorian poet
- Lieutenant-General Sir Francis Lloyd (1853–1926), lived latterly at Rolls Park in Chigwell.
- Vicki Michelle Actress, born in Chigwell.
- Bobby Moore, footballer, captain of the 1966 FIFA World Cup-winning England team
- Lieutenant Colonel Augustus Charles Newman, recipient of the Victoria Cross for actions at the St Nazaire Raid, was born in the town.
- Ronnie O'Sullivan, snooker player
- Ruth Rendell, crime writer, worked as a journalist on the Chigwell Times
- George Shillibeer, creator of the London omnibus, plaque at St Mary's parish church
- Alan Sugar, billionaire entrepreneur, former owner of Amstrad, host of The Apprentice.
- Mark Wallinger (born 1959), artist, creator of the Tube Labyrinth art project.
- General Sir John Watson, recipient of the Victoria Cross for actions at Lucknow during the Indian Mutiny, was born in the town.
