= Chigwell Row =

Village in Essex, England

Coordinates: 51.6256°N 0.1095°E

- Location within Essex
- Population: 2,243
- OS grid reference: TQ461939
- Civil parish: Chigwell
- District: Epping Forest
- Shire county: Essex
- Region: East
- Country: England
- Sovereign state: United Kingdom
- Post town: CHIGWELL
- Postcode district: IG7
- Dialling code: 020
- Police: Essex
- Fire: Essex
- Ambulance: East of England
- UK Parliament: Epping Forest

Chigwell Row is a small village falling within the Epping Forest district of Essex. It is located 12.9 miles (20.8 km) north east of Charing Cross. It has a London (020) area code, is served by London Buses route 150, and the closest London Underground station is Grange Hill.

== Notable residents ==
- Prof Edward Philip Harrison FRSE (1877-1948) physicist, meteorologist and military engineer
