= Derby Road railway station =

Railway station in Suffolk, England

Coordinates: 52.051°N 1.183°E

Derby Road
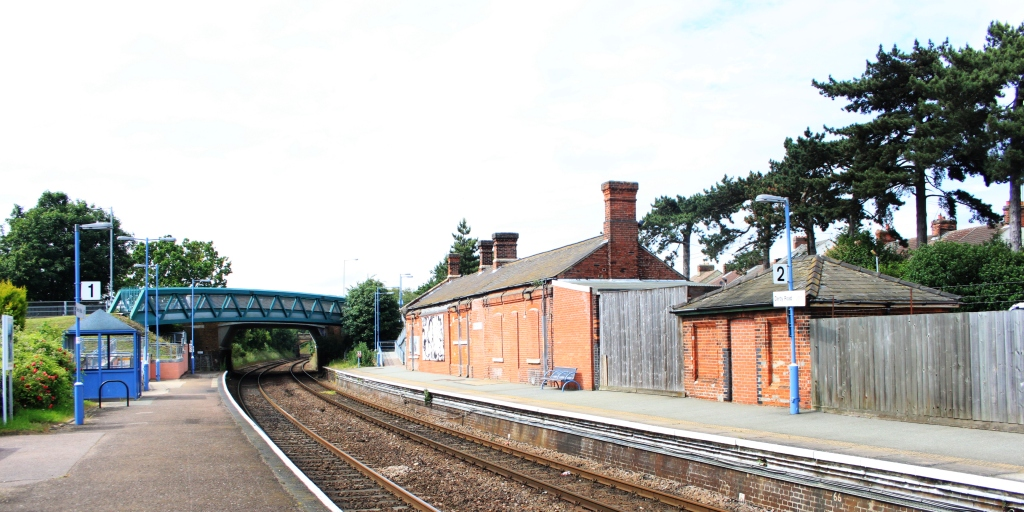
- Derby Road in 2012, looking towards Ipswich

General information
- Location: Ipswich, Borough of Ipswich; England
- Grid reference: TM183439
- Managed by: Greater Anglia
- Platforms: 2

Other information
- Station code: DBR
- Classification: DfT category F2

History
- Opened: 1 May 1877

Passengers
- 2020/21: ▼18,040
- 2021/22: ▲56,746
- 2022/23: ▲73,198
- 2023/24: ▲81,986
- 2024/25: ▲95,046
Location
Notes
- Passenger statistics from the Office of Rail and Road

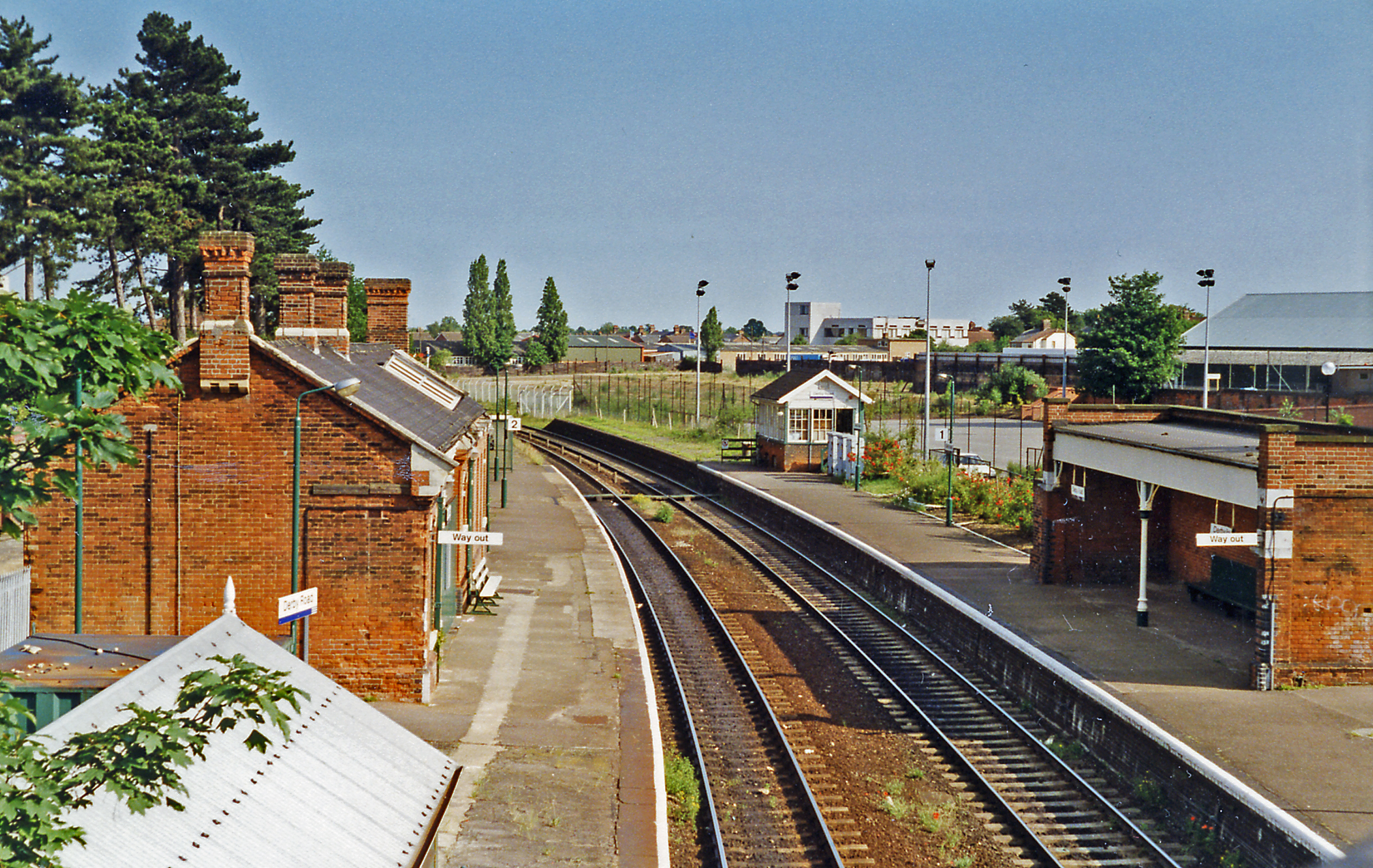
View eastward, towards Felixstowe, in 1997

Derby Road railway station (also known as Derby Road (Ipswich)) is on the Felixstowe Branch Line in the east of England, serving the Rose Hill area and southern area of California on the eastern side of the town of Ipswich, Suffolk. It is 6 miles 8 chains (9.8 km) down the line from Ipswich station and 74 miles 67 chains (120.4 km) measured from London Liverpool Street; It is situated between Westerfield and Trimley and is managed by Greater Anglia, which also operates all passenger trains that call.

The station was opened by the Felixstowe Railway and Pier Company in 1877 and takes its name from the street on which it is located in Ipswich. It used to be a popular station for people travelling from the eastern side of Ipswich to the seaside at Felixstowe due to its connection to the local tram system.

== History ==
The act of Parliament for the Felixstowe Railway and Pier, the Felixstowe Railway and Pier Act 1875 (38 & 39 Vict. c. cxlv), was granted on 19 July 1875. It was soon built and opened, along with the station at "Derby Road (Ipswich)", on 1 May 1877. The Suffolk Chronicle described its location as "the most inconvenient and out-of-the way spot which could have been selected" and during the line's pre-opening inspection by the Board of Trade, the mayor of Ipswich unsuccessfully made representations for an additional station a half-mile to the north between Spring Road and Woodbridge Road.

On 1 September 1879 the Great Eastern Railway took over operation of the line, although the original Felixstowe company retained ownership until 5 July 1887, when it sold the railway to the GER. In October 1879 the "Ipswich" suffix was dropped from the station name and some trains now continued beyond Westerfield to the main Ipswich station. This allowed better connections with trains on the main line, but that station, like Derby Road, was outside the commercial centre of the town.

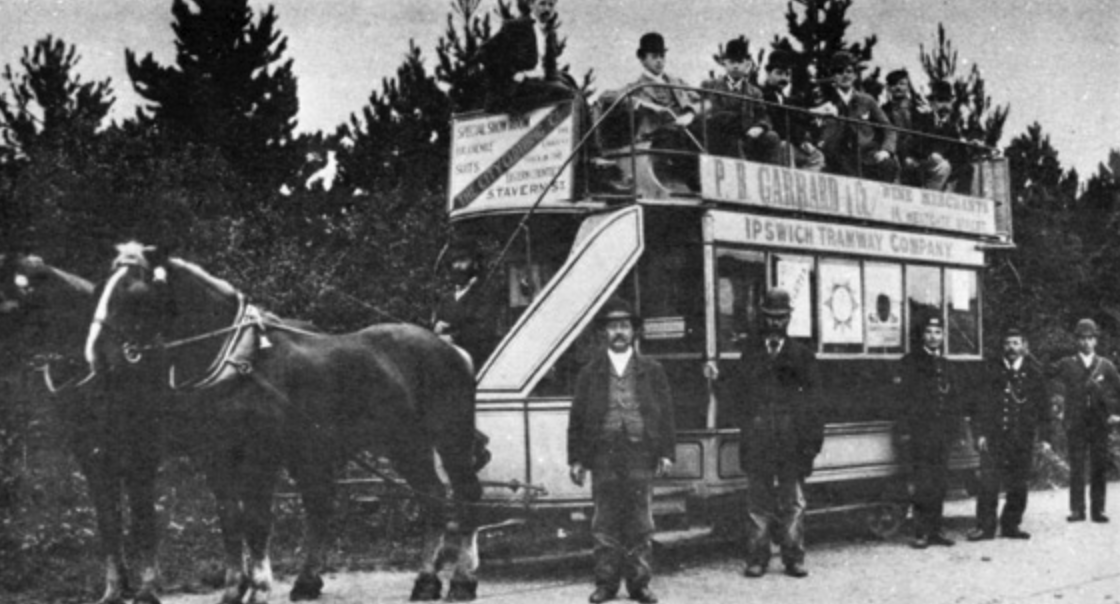
Ipswich Tramway Company Horsecar No. 3, 1880s outside Derby Road station

People living on the eastern side of the town generally preferred to use Derby Road when travelling to Felixstowe and the station could be very busy on sunny weekends with day trippers to Felixstowe Beach and Felixstowe Pier. They could reach the station on the Ipswich Tramway which terminated outside the entrance. Consequently, many trains from Felixstowe turned around here instead of continuing to Ipswich. The station was rebuilt with a second platform in 1891.

An accelerated diesel-powered service was introduced to the branch on 15 June 1959. Orwell station was closed, but the journey time from Ipswich to Felixstowe Town was reduced from 35 to 24 minutes, which allowed a diesel multiple unit to work there and back within one hour. In 1967 the branch was converted to "Pay Train" operation, with all fares being collected by the guard so that no staff were needed at the stations other than a signalman. By the end of that year, passenger trains no longer continued beyond Felixstowe Town, but that part of the line was retained for a few freight services to Felixstowe docks, which had just started to handle shipping containers.

By 1986 there were 12 to 13 container trains passing through Derby Road in each direction to and from Felixstowe. These lengthy trains could not pass at Derby Road as the loop was too short, and the large number of these trains was causing disruption to the passenger service which was running less frequently than in the past. To resolve these issues the loop was extended in 1999. At the same time the signal box was closed and control of the line transferred to Colchester Panel Signal Box.

The Derby Road bridge over the railway was rebuilt in 2003 to take the higher containers from Felixstowe docks.

== Description ==
When the station opened it had a single platform on the north side of the line (despite the town centre being on the other side). Sidings on both side of the line were accessed from the Felixstowe end of the station; a two-arch bridge carried the road over the line at the other end. A passing loop was added in 1891 which allowed another platform to be added on the south side of the line where a signal box was situated. More sidings were added over the years, including ones serving coal merchants and a scrap yard.

Today both platforms are still in use. The station offices on the eastbound platform are still standing but unused; on the westbound platform there is a waiting shelter.

== Services ==
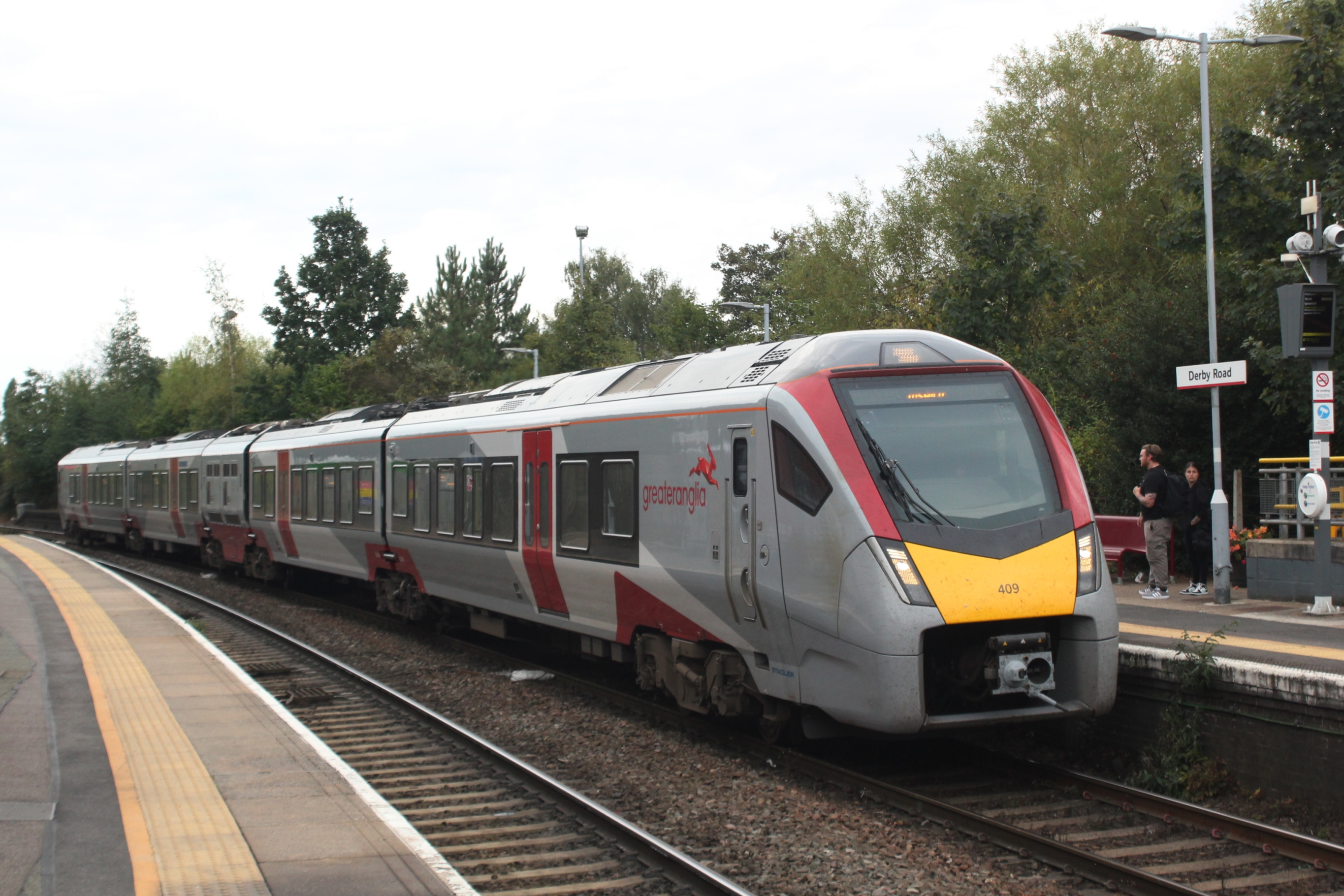
A Class 755 at Derby Road with a Felixstowe to Ipswich train

When the railway opened in 1877 there were six trains to and from Felixstowe and four to and from Westerfield. By 1939 this had increased to 20 Felixstowe services, most of which continued through to Ipswich. In 1973 this had been reduced to just 13 trains each way, all of which now ran through to Ipswich.

As of December 2023 the typical Monday-Saturday service at Derby Road was one train in each direction each hour.

The line also carries substantial freight traffic to and from the Port of Felixstowe operated by Freightliner, DB Cargo and GB Railfreight but there are no sidings nowadays at Derby Road.

Preceding station	National Rail	Following station
Westerfield	Greater Anglia Felixstowe Branch Line	Trimley
	Historical railways	
Westerfield	Great Eastern Railway; Felixstowe Branch Line	Orwell
