= Trimley =

Trimley may refer to the following places in Suffolk, England:

- Trimley railway station
- Trimley Lower Street
- Trimley St Mary
- Trimley St Martin
