= Trimley St Mary =

Village in Suffolk, England

Coordinates: 51.978°N 1.323°E

Trimley St. Mary
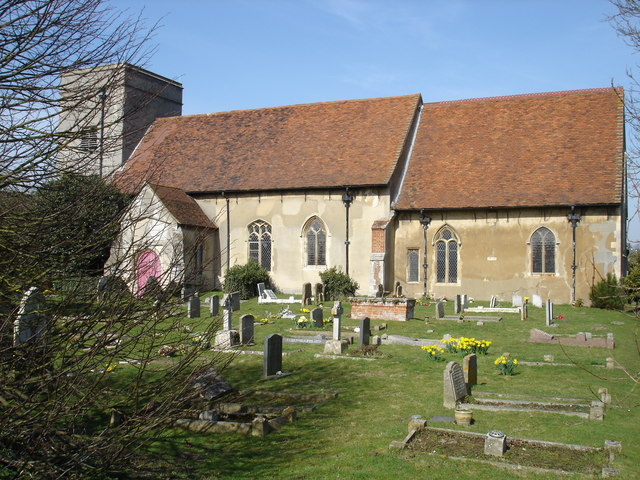

- Location within Suffolk
- Population: 3,665 (2011)
- OS grid reference: TM 281 363
- Civil parish: Trimley St Mary
- District: East Suffolk
- Shire county: Suffolk
- Region: East
- Country: England
- Sovereign state: United Kingdom
- Post town: Felixstowe
- Postcode district: IP11
- Dialling code: 01394

Trimley St. Mary is a parish and village on the outskirts of Felixstowe, on a low-lying peninsula between Harwich Harbour and the River Deben, in the East Suffolk district, in Suffolk, England. It lies on the Roman road between Felixstowe and Ipswich. Its eastern border is Spriteshall Lane. The village, and its neighbour Trimley St. Martin, are famous for their adjacent churches, which were built as the result of a historical family feud. St. Mary's church is the southerly church (at grid reference TM 276 369). The village has a number of shops, and two pubs. Trimley railway station serves the village on the Felixstowe Branch Line.

According to the 2011 census, the population of Trimley was 3,665.

In the 1870s, Trimley St Mary was described in this way:

Trimley St. Martin and T. St. Mary are two parishes in Woodbridge district. The churches stand in one churchyard, and are both rubble buildings.

== History ==
The name Trimley means "Trymma's woodland clearing".

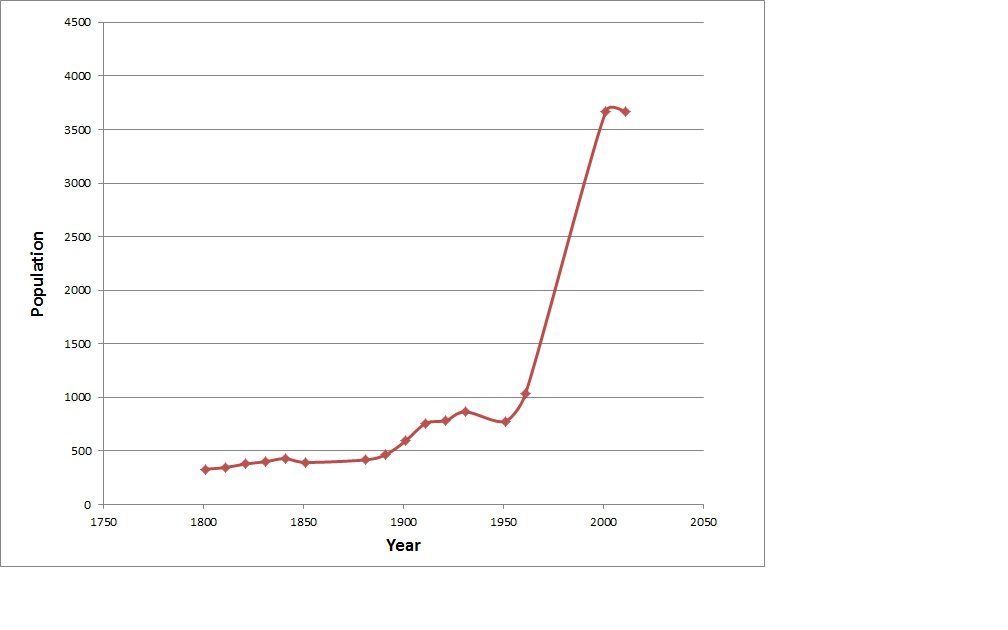
Trimley St Mary population time series 1801–2001

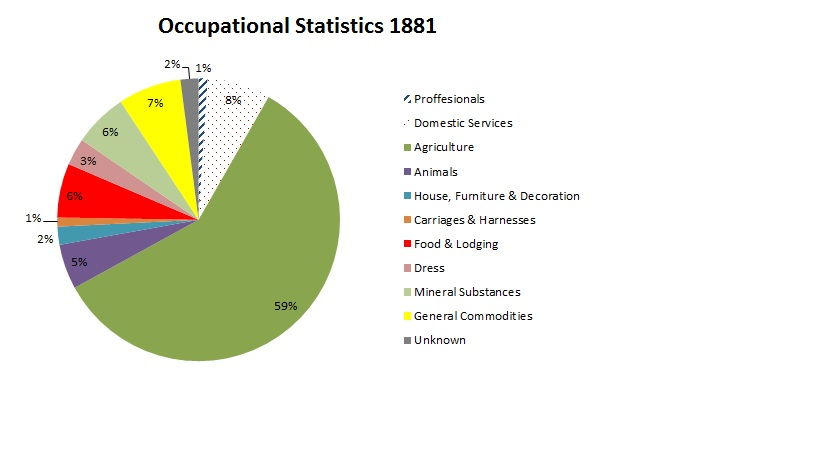
Occupational Statistics 1881

Recent archaeological findings in neighbouring Walton showed evidence of Bronze Age field systems in use. The Domesday Book entries for Trimley St Mary and St Martin show there to have been a number of farms and households in the area. There is also a reference to "Plumgeard", which may have been in the area.

By 1811, the census shows that the population of the parish was 346, with 175 males and 171 females. In the village, 35 families were chiefly employed in agriculture, 17 in trade/manufacture and the remaining 19 families were unknown or not recorded. There is more data on occupations in 1881. The breakdown for the males was 57 in agriculture, 7 in general commodities, 7 in domestic services/offices, 6 in food and lodging and 5 working with animals. In contrast, 26 females worked in domestic services and offices and the occupation of the remaining 76 was not stated. The population of Trimley St Mary has continued to grow since records began in 1801, when the population was only 330. By 2011, it had reached 3,665. The 2011 census showed that employment in Trimley has altered greatly. The percentage working in agriculture has declined to less than 1% of the working population. The biggest increases have been seen in manufacturing, wholesale, retail, transport, storage and education. This parallels the general trend of change throughout the rest of England, where the agricultural industry has seen large declines, along with most industries of the primary sector of the economy as people have moved over to the secondary and tertiary sectors in hope of greater pay and better conditions in the workplace.

== Governance ==
Trimley St Mary is part of the electoral ward called Trimleys with Kirton. The total population of this ward at the 2011 Census was 6,923.

== Present day ==
Trimley St. Mary is a small parish lying between Walton (an area of Felixstowe) and Ipswich. There is a variety of local businesses, including window cleaners, beauticians, photographers, metal works, recycling plants, dog groomers, garages, and a care home. The parish also contains Trimley St Mary Primary School, which in 2014 catered for 370 pupils and has been in existence since 1904, maintaining a good reputation.

In July the two parishes of Trimley take part in a two-day annual carnival.

In 2013, the majority of houses that were sold in Trimley St. Mary were detached, averaging at £227,429. The overall average house price for the area came out at £184,795, which was said to have been up on the 2012 average by 10%.

Environmental information from 2005 census data showed that over 75% of the parish was termed "greenspace"; including domestic gardens, this rises to 85%—still below the average for England.

The 2011 census data showed that 3,493 of the 3,665 people living in Trimley St Mary were from the United Kingdom. Of the remaining 172 people, 81 came from Europe, 18 from Africa, 32 from the Middle East and Asia, 31 from the Americas and the Caribbean and the remaining 3 from Oceania and Antarctica. This is a lower number of residents from other countries than the general trend for the UK but is similar to the average for the Suffolk coast.

== Trimley Bypass ==
The Trimley bypass was built in the early 1970s to divert traffic from the expanding Port of Felixstowe away from the Trimleys.

== Places of interest ==
St Mary's Church was effectively closed in the 1980s and has struggled ever since to gain sufficient popularity to reopen as most people have been drawn into the more exciting churches down in Felixstowe. St Mary's and the parish church of neighbour Trimley St Martin are located in adjacent churchyards. The church is said to have a wonderful array of stained glass windows from the late 19th and 20th centuries.

The Mariners Free House returned to its original name in August 2015, after being called The Three Mariners for a number of years. It has been a Grade II listed building since 1983. The pub had an annual charity day on which local bands came and played, and a barbecue was supplied and a raffle held to raise money.

The war memorials are inside St Mary's church. There are two memorials to the fallen soldiers of World War 1. The first is a plaque with the names of soldiers on display and a Celtic cross above. The other is a stained glass window dedicated to the soldiers, with an image of Christ and his disciples.

The Welcome Hall next door to the Three Mariners pub was erected in 1902 by the lord chancellor, Lord Halsbury, and was provided by the Pretyman family. After the hall was passed on to village trustees in 1939, it was used for recreational purposes and mental/physical training. Thanks to the board of trustees, the hall received a badly needed new roof in 1996. The hall can be hired out by groups and is used for many activities, such as yoga, line dancing, dance, musical theatre, Zen meditation, keep fit, WI gatherings and PCC meetings.

== Transport ==
The A14 is the nearest major road to Trimley St Mary, and runs between Felixstowe port and the Midlands. The nearest junction is 59, which can be accessed in Trimley.

Trimley railway station is a listed building and is on the Felixstowe Branch Line. London Stansted Airport is the nearest airport and is approximately 55 miles away.
