= Felixstowe Beach railway station =

Disused railway station in Suffolk, England

Felixstowe Beach
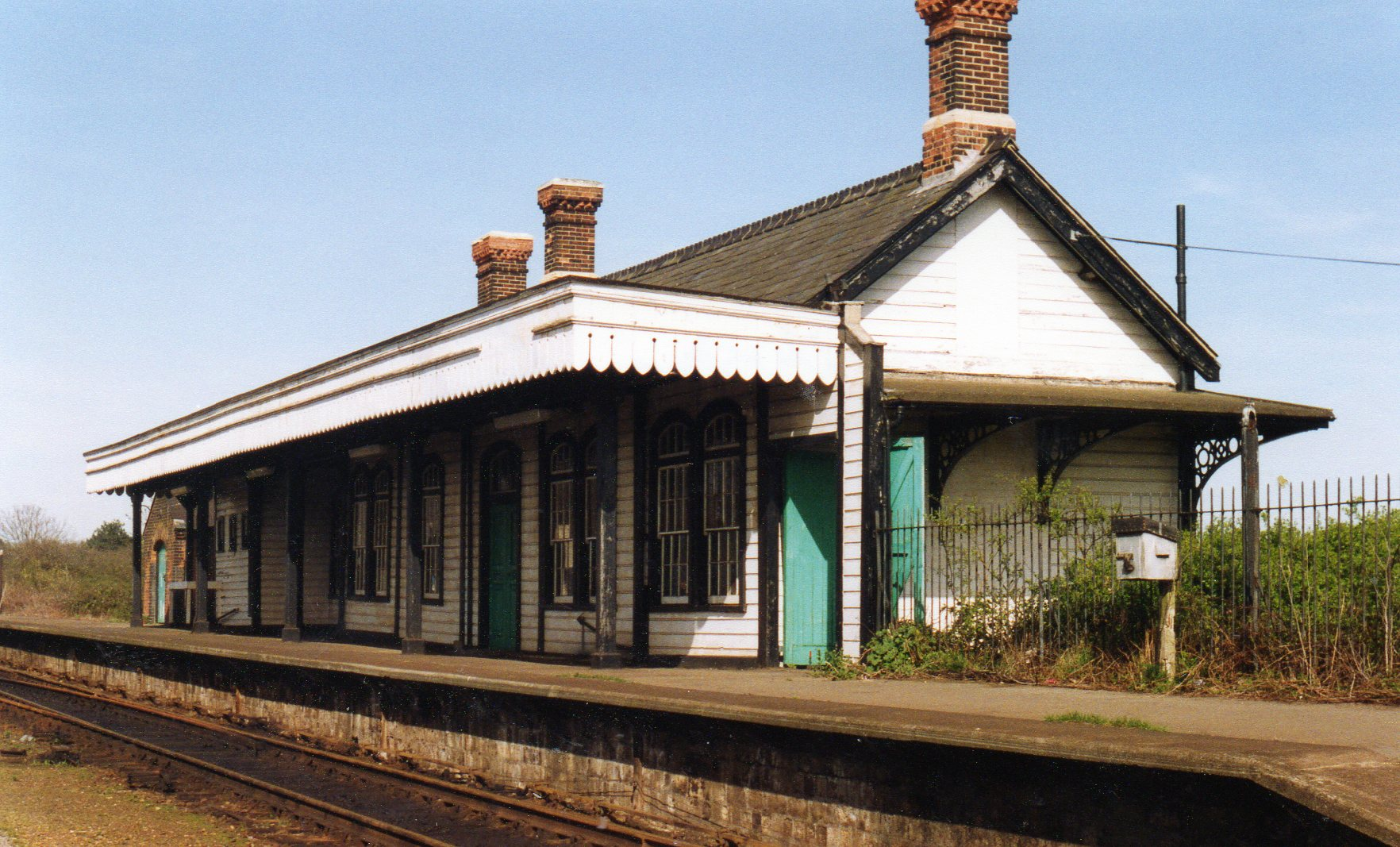
- Felixstowe Beach railway station in 1993

General information
- Location: Felixstowe, East Suffolk; England
- Coordinates: 51.9534°N 1.3342°E
- Grid reference: TM292335
- Platforms: 1

Other information
- Status: Disused

History
- Original company: Felixstowe Railway and Pier Company
- Pre-grouping: Great Eastern Railway
- Post-grouping: London and North Eastern Railway

Key dates
- 1 May 1877: Opened
- 5 December 1966: Closed to goods
- 11 September 1967: Closed to passengers
- 2004: Buildings demolished
Location

Felixstowe Beach was a railway station which served the seafront and southern part of Felixstowe in Suffolk, England. First opened in 1877, the station closed to freight on 5 December 1966 and to passenger traffic on 11 September 1967. The line remains open and connects with railway lines in the Port of Felixstowe.

== History ==
The Felixstowe Railway and Pier opened on 1 May 1877 but there were no stations between Orwell and the terminus at Felixstowe Pier as the station near the beach at Felixstowe was not ready in time, although it did open soon after. The company had been promoted by Colonel George Tomline who owned property near the station. He was criticised by the Suffolk Chronicle for building the stations where he thought "people ought to be, rather than where people actually live". It has been claimed that it was location was chosen to be away from his rival John Chevalier Cobbold's Ordnance Hotel, which was close to the railway on Landguard Road. The station had goods facilities and also the line's engine shed.

Preceding station	Historical railways	Following station
Trimley	Felixstowe Railway and Pier	Felixstowe Pier

The Great Eastern Railway (GER) bought the line on 5 July 1887. The engine shed was soon closed but the site is believed to have been used for coaling and watering of locomotives for some time after. Eventually this was undertaken at Felixstowe Town station which was equipped with a turntable. There was a large three-road shed adjacent to the engine shed and in 1894 a carriage painting facility was opened which this dealt with the painting of around 200 carriages each year. (Note: Some publications state that 2,000 carriages were repainted at Felixstowe each year, but such a volume is unlikely at such a small depot.) This was a relatively short-lived activity at Felixstowe as the expansion of facilities at Stratford Works in the late 1900s would have rendered the establishment redundant. It was noted as redundant in 1927 when it was identified for use as the line's engine shed (the original having blown down) but burnt down in the 1930s.

The station was enlarged in 1888 but a new and more conveniently sited Felixstowe Town station opened on 1 July 1898. The original station was renamed Felixstowe Beach and the direct line from Ipswich was closed with the result that all trains now had to reverse in the new station.

The GER became a part of the London and North Eastern Railway on 1 January 1923, and this in turn became the Eastern Region of British Railways on 1 January 1948. Passenger trains beyond the Beach station to Felixstowe Pier were withdrawn from 2 July 1951. The low-lying area around the station was inundated by a fatal flood on 1 February 1953.

Preceding station	Historical railways	Following station
Felixstowe Town	London and North Eastern Railway; Felixstowe Branch Line	Terminus

On 2 November 1959 daily passenger services were withdrawn between Felixstowe Town and Felixstowe Beach, thereafter they were run only during the summer until the end of the 1967 season when it closed completely. Public freight facilities had been withdrawn on 5 December 1966 but the line remained open for freight traffic to the docks. This soon became much heavier following the opening of a new container terminal in 1967. On 13 May 1970 a new direct line was opened to avoid the need to reverse Felixstowe Town.

In 1971 the original signal box was closed and replaced by a prefab structure located by the level crossing gates. In 1976 the sidings at the station were removed, leaving just a single track and the unused platform. The line was resignalled in 1999 and has since been controlled from Colchester Panel Signalling Box. It was decided to maintain the line as far as Felixstowe Beach to passenger standard in case a service to there is resumed in the future. The station building was demolished by the Strategic Rail Authority in April 2004 but left the platform intact. Suffolk County Council considered proposals to reopen the station in 2006.

== Description ==
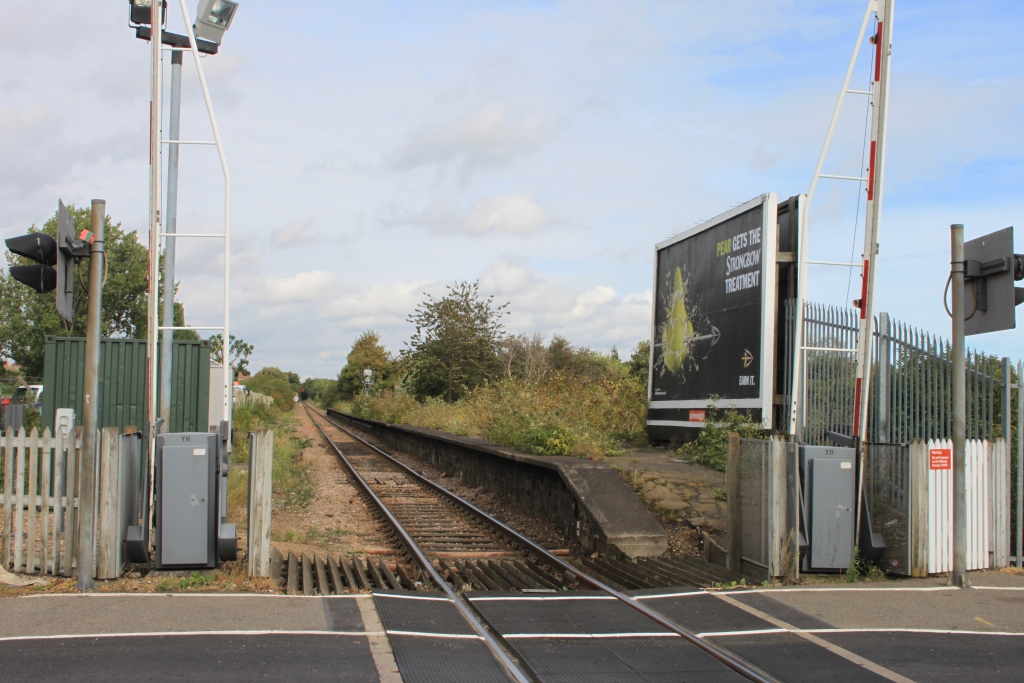
Now only the platform and level crossing remain

Felixstowe Beach is situated at the bottom of a gradient that brings the line down from Trimley to near sea level. The single platform was on the east side of the line just north of the level crossing of a road that leads down to the beach itself. In 1888 the platform was extended to 510 feet (160 m) and an additional (dead-end) track was laid behind it. The 30-lever signal box was at the north end of the platform until 1971 when a smaller structure was provided on the west side of the line to the north of the level crossing.

Goods facilities were provided on the west side of the line opposite the passenger station. The two-road engine shed was to the north of this on the level alongside the foot of the gradient up to Trimley.

Since 2004 only the platform has stood beside a single track to the north of the level crossing on Beach Station Road. On the opposite side of the level crossing are Felixstowe Creek Sidings, the interchange point with the railways in the Port of Felixstowe.
