= Trimley railway station =

Railway station in Suffolk, England

Coordinates: 51.9767°N 1.3194°E

Trimley
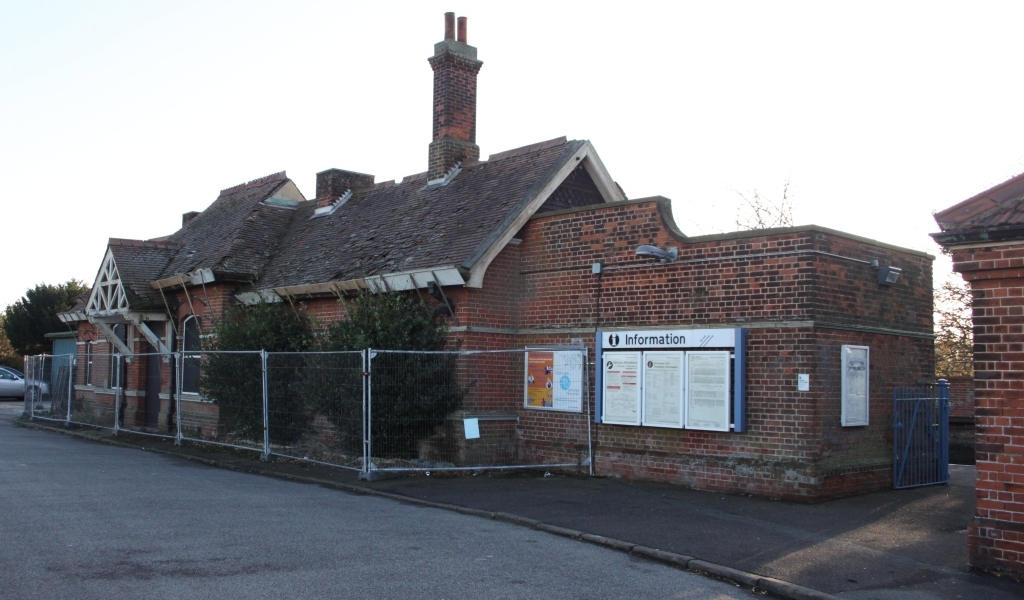

General information
- Location: Trimley St. Mary, East Suffolk; England
- Grid reference: TM280361
- Manager: Greater Anglia
- Platforms: 1

Other information
- Station code: TRM
- Classification: DfT category F2

History
- Opened: 1891

Passengers
- 2020/21: ▼7,366
- 2021/22: ▲35,612
- 2022/23: ▲41,164
- 2023/24: ▲45,948
- 2024/25: ▲57,006
Location
Notes
- Passenger statistics from the Office of Rail and Road

Trimley railway station is on the Felixstowe branch line in the east of England, serving the village of Trimley St. Mary, Suffolk. It is 14 miles 5 chains (22.6 km) down the line from Ipswich and 82 miles 64 chains (133.3 km) measured from London Liverpool Street; it is situated between Derby Road and Felixstowe. Its three-letter station code is TRM.

It was opened by the Great Eastern Railway (GER) in 1891 and built to a design by the company's chief architect, W. N. Ashbee; it was one of only two stations outside Essex to be built in the New Essex, or Ashbee, style. A branch line for goods trains to the port of Felixstowe was opened at Trimley in 1987.

Today it is managed by Greater Anglia, which also operates all passenger trains that call.

== History ==
The Felixstowe Railway and Pier Company opened their line from Westerfield to Felixstowe Pier 1 May 1877 but the nearest station, other than at the pier near Landguard Common, was 'Orwell' at Nacton; a station at Felixstowe Beach was soon added but this was on the far side of the town so of little use to people in the Trimleys. On 1 May 1891 that the station at Trimley was opened, by which time the railway had been purchased by the GER and trains were running through from Ipswich where connections were better than at Westerfield. In 1898 a new Felixstowe Town was opened which was more convenient for people travelling to the town.

Public freight facilities were withdrawn on 13 July 1964, although they were retained at Felixstowe until 5 December 1966. In 1967 the branch was converted to "Pay Train" operation, with all fares being collected by the guard so that the only staff left at Trimley were the signalmen.

A new direct line to Felixstowe docks was opened in 1970, with Felixstowe Beach Junction created between Trimley and Felixstowe. At the same time the signal box at Felixstowe was closed, the electric signals and new junction being operated from Trimley.

Work on a new line from the east end of Trimley station to the Northern Freightliner Terminal at Felixstowe docks started in March 1986 and it was opened for traffic on 16 February 1987. It involved heavy earthworks and cost £2,000,000 but the dock owners received a 40% grant under Section 8 of the Railways Act 1974 as it would reduce road traffic. As part of this work the signal box was closed and a modular building provided instead. This was west of the level crossing on the south side of the line.

In 1997 this signal box was closed, control of the branch being transferred to Colchester Panel Signal Box. Colour light signals and motor-driven points are fitted throughout, while the level crossing is monitored by CCTV. A signal passed at danger (SPAD) indicator was installed on the platform to act as a warning to train drivers approaching from Felixstowe should they pass a red signal.

From May 2019 the infrastructure layout at Trimley was altered in connection with the partial doubling of the line towards Ipswich to accommodate more freight traffic. This meant trains from the Felixstowe direction could access the disused platform line (although this was not re-opened) and then two tracks extended westward for just over a mile to Gun Lane Junction. Both lines are bi-directionally signalled.

== Description ==
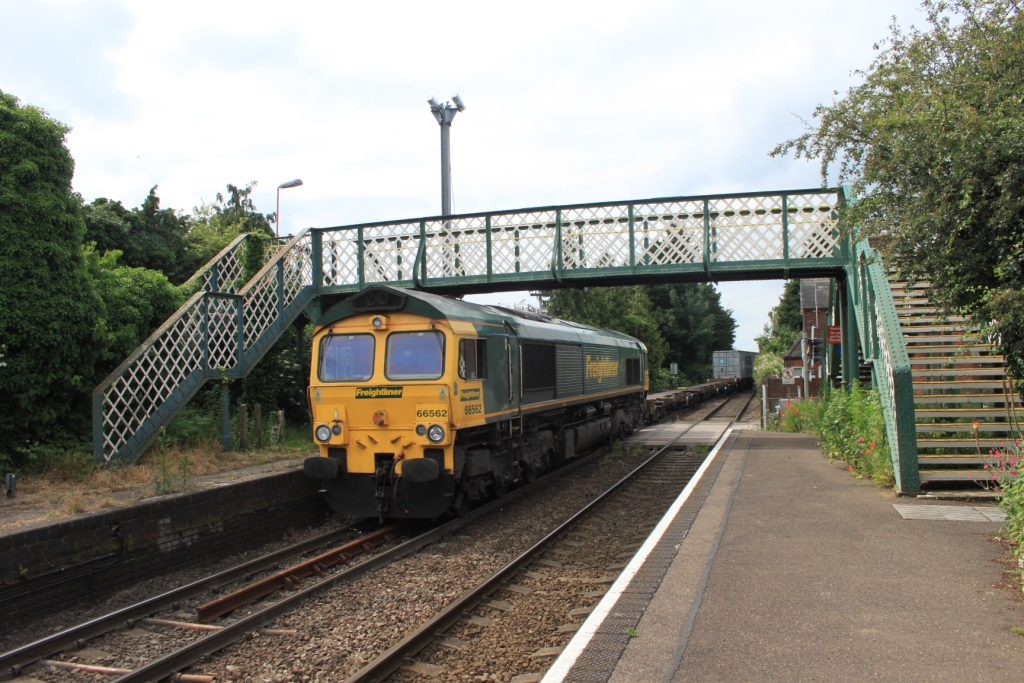
A train to Felixstowe North runs through what used to be the westbound platform

The railway to Felixstowe was built with just a single track, but when Trimley station was built a second track was laid to allow trains to pass in the station. A platform was built for each track. The northern one (used by trains to Felixstowe) is nearer the village and so was provided with a single-storey building, also a small goods lock-up and a house for the station master. Two goods sidings were laid behind this platform. The southern platform (for trains to Ipswich) was provided with a waiting room and the signal box was built here, at the eastern end opposite the points for the goods sidings. People reach the station from the village along Cordy's Lane, which has a level crossing over the railway at the west end of the platforms.

The loop was severed at the eastern end in 1987 in order to provide a connection to the new line to Felixstowe North Freightliner Terminal. Because of this the westbound platform was taken out of use and passenger trains in both directions now use the northern platform.

== Services ==
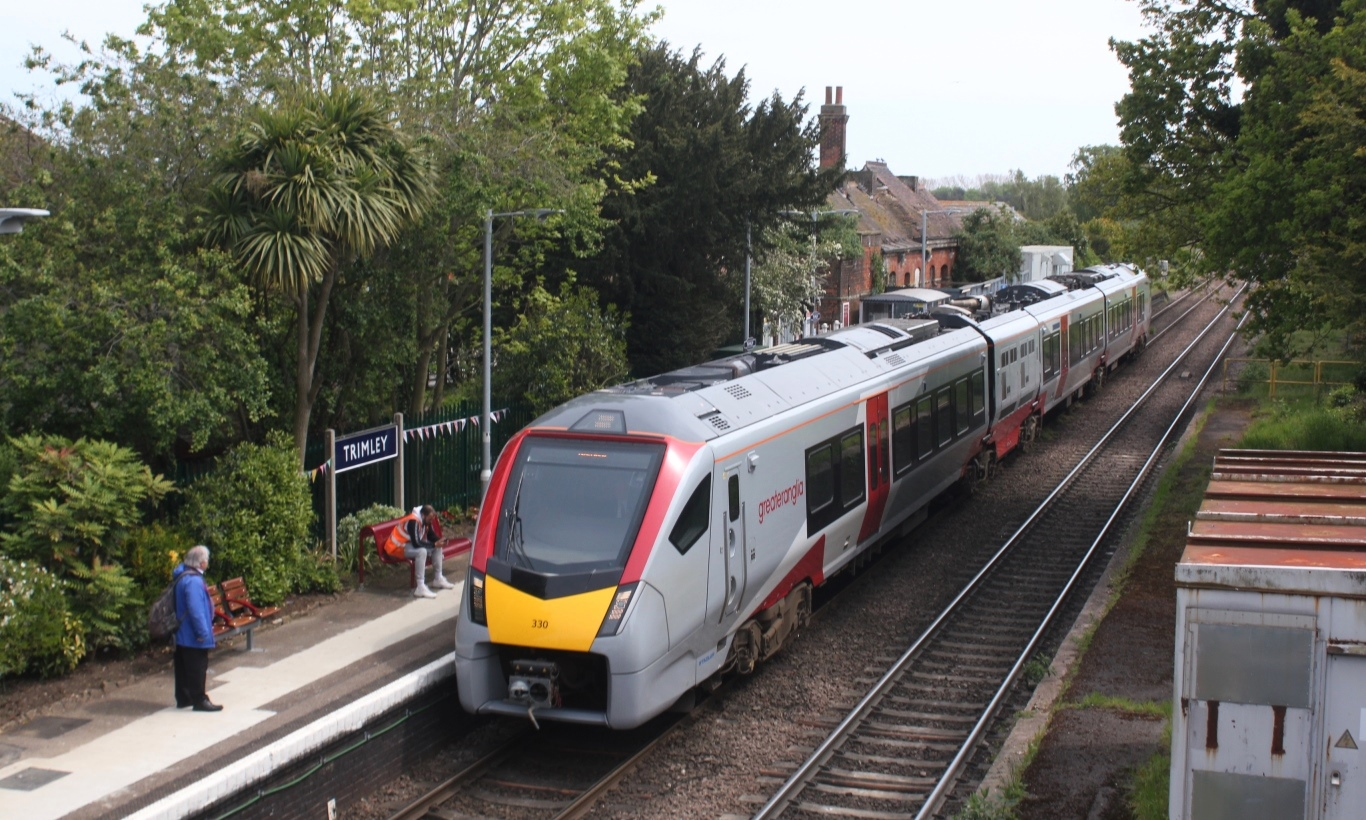
A Class 755 train bound for Ipswich

As of December 2016, the typical Monday-Saturday off-peak service at Trimley is one train per hour in each direction between Ipswich and Felixstowe.

Trains are operated by Greater Anglia, and are typically Class 755.

Preceding station	National Rail	Following station
Derby Road	Greater Anglia Felixstowe Branch Line	Felixstowe
	Historical railways	
Orwell	Great Eastern Railway Felixstowe Branch Line	Felixstowe

== Proposed developments ==
In 2009 Network Rail proposed to demolish the empty station building. A 'Friends of Trimley Station' group was formed and Network Rail agreed that they would leave it standing if a viable use was found for it. Suffolk Coastal District Council asked the local residents and found that there was a demand for a community meeting place and an internet café. In 2011 Network Rail offered the Friends a two-year lease to allow them time to waterproof the building and secure the funding necessary to create a meeting room and café. If successful they would then grant a long-term lease. By the end of the year the Friends had succeeded in establishing a limited company, Trimley Station Community Trust, to take on the lease. As of September 2026, no definite plans have been put forward regarding the building's use. The group has also been assessing the condition of the building and possible costs to repair the roof.
