= Felixstowe branch line =

Railway branch line in Suffolk, England

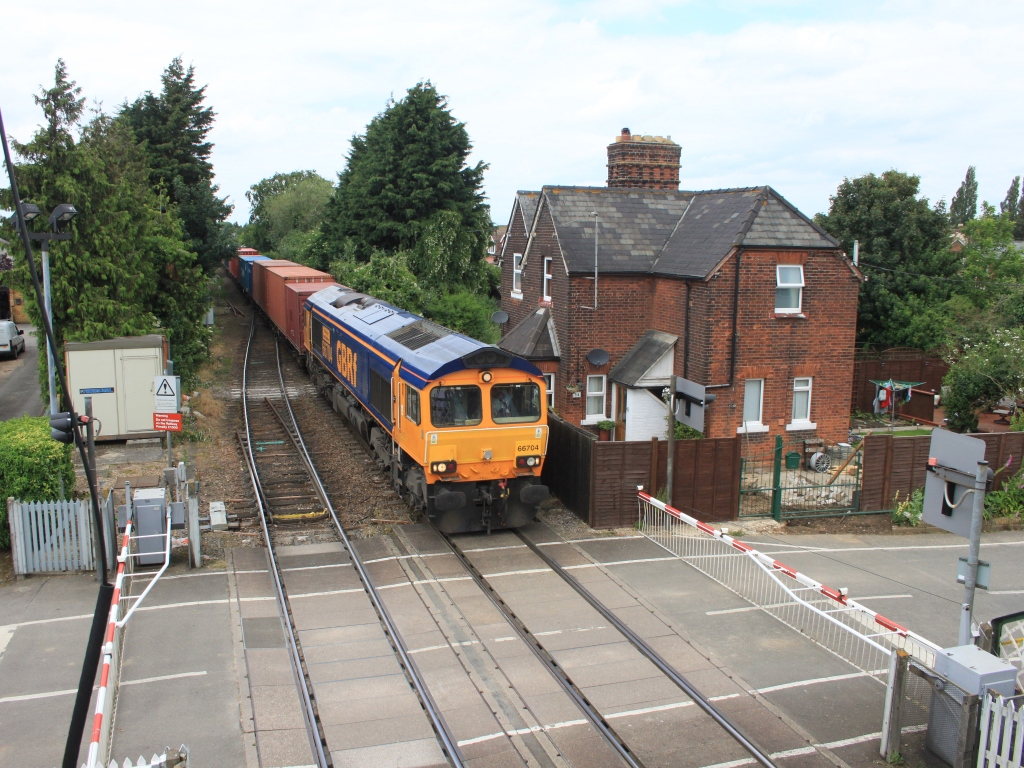
- A GB Railfreight Class 66 passes through Trimley with a container train for the port of Felixstowe

Overview
- Status: Operational
- Owner: Network Rail
- Locale: Suffolk, England
- Termini: Westerfield; Felixstowe
- Stations: 4

Service
- Type: Heavy rail
- System: National Rail
- Operators: Passenger: Greater Anglia; Freight: DB Schenker, Freightliner, GB Railfreight
- Rolling stock: Passenger: Class 755; Freight: Class 66, Class 70

History
- Opened: 1 May 1877

Technical
- Line length: 12 miles 5 chains (19.4 km)
- Number of tracks: 1
- Character: Secondary
- Track gauge: 4 ft 8 1/2 in (1,435 mm) standard gauge
- Operating speed: 75 mph (121 km/h)
Route map
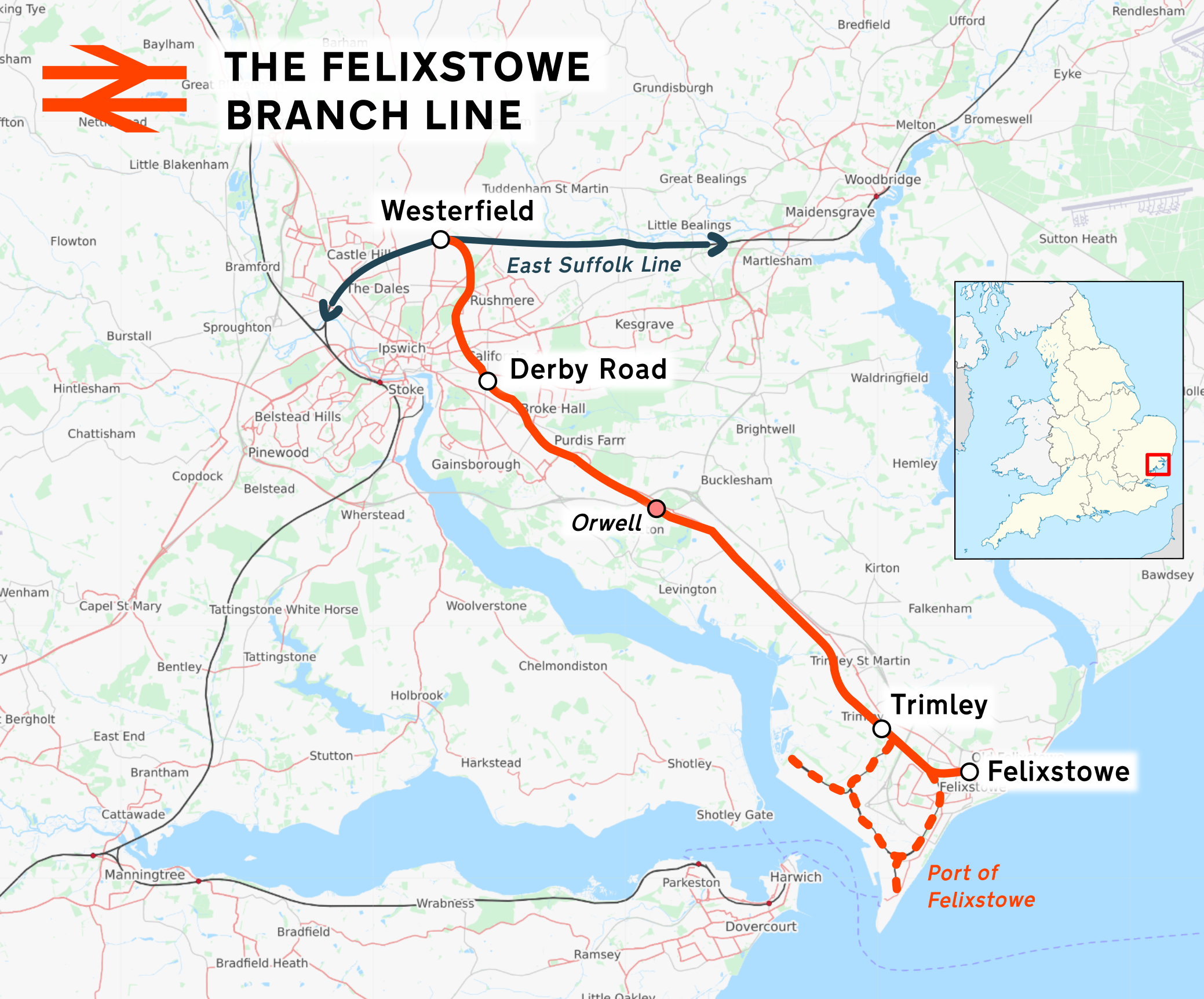
(Click to expand)

The Felixstowe branch line is a railway branch line in Suffolk, England, that connects the Great Eastern Main Line to Felixstowe and its port.

The line is 12 miles 5 chains (19.4 km) in length from Westerfield to Felixstowe. The stations and all passenger services are operated by Greater Anglia. The passenger services originate at Ipswich but the branch itself starts one station further along at Westerfield. The line also carries freight trains operated by DB Schenker, Freightliner and GB Railfreight, to the port of Felixstowe.

The line was opened by the Felixstowe Railway and Pier Company in 1877, although the first station in Felixstowe was not in the town but at the company's pier on the River Orwell. The railway was sold to the Great Eastern Railway in 1887. A station near Felixstowe town centre was opened in 1898 and this has been the only station in the town since 1967. Freight traffic has increased significantly since that time, leading to the opening of a second route to the port in 1987.

As of December 2016 passenger service frequency on the line is typically one train per hour in each direction between Ipswich and Felixstowe. The timetabled journey time from one terminus to the other is 26 minutes.

== Description ==
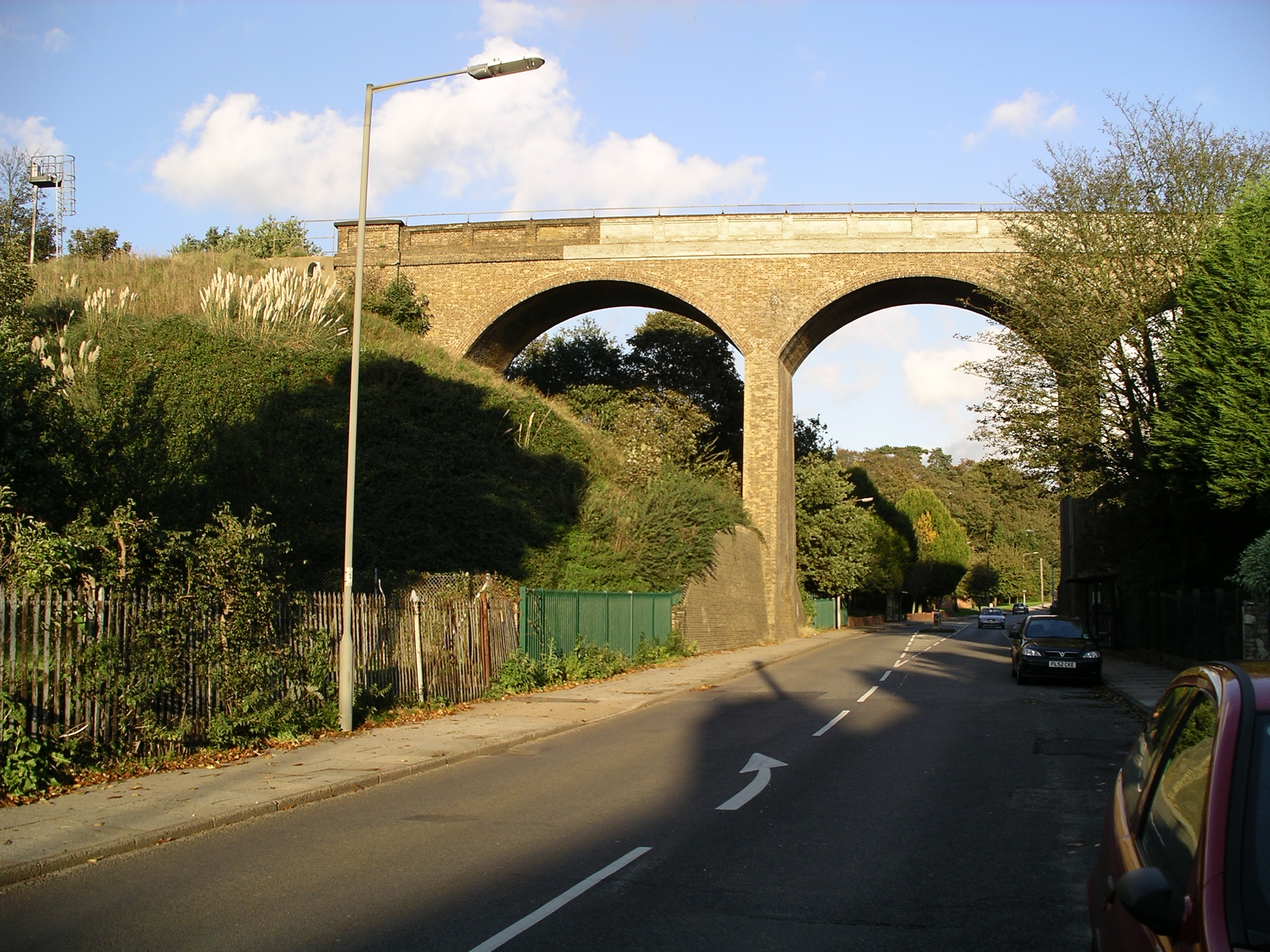
Spring Road Viaduct

The Felixstowe branch is an unelectrified, single track secondary line with a maximum line speed of 75 mph (121 km/h), although lower limits apply at some places. It has a W10 loading gauge but W9 rolling stock is excluded.

Westerfield railway station is 3.51 miles (5.65 km) from Ipswich where the passenger trains to Felixstowe start their journey, although the milepost reads 72 1/4 as the line is measured from London. It has two platforms, both of which are accessed from the road that passes over the level crossing at the west end of the station. Both up and down Felixstowe trains today share the up platform with East Suffolk Line trains towards Ipswich; the down platform is used by East Suffolk Line services to Woodbridge and beyond. When the Felixstowe line first opened the trains terminated in another track on the southern side of the up platform, alongside which is the old Felixstowe Railway and Pier Company building, now no longer used by the railway. Felixstowe trains curve to the right at Westerfield Junction as they leave the station to join the Felixstowe branch line.

The line climbs for a short distance at 1 in 85 and swings towards the south, coming back into the suburbs of Ipswich. At milepost 73 (4.75 miles (7.64 km) from Westerfield) the line starts to drop down towards the three-arch Spring Road Viaduct, the only significant engineering feature on the branch. The train now enters a section of double track through Derby Road station (6.10 miles (9.82 km) from Ipswich station by train, but only 1.5 miles (2.4 km) on the map) where trains can pass. The line now leaves Ipswich for the last time. Just beyond milepost 78 the train passes the site of Orwell station which was closed in 1959.

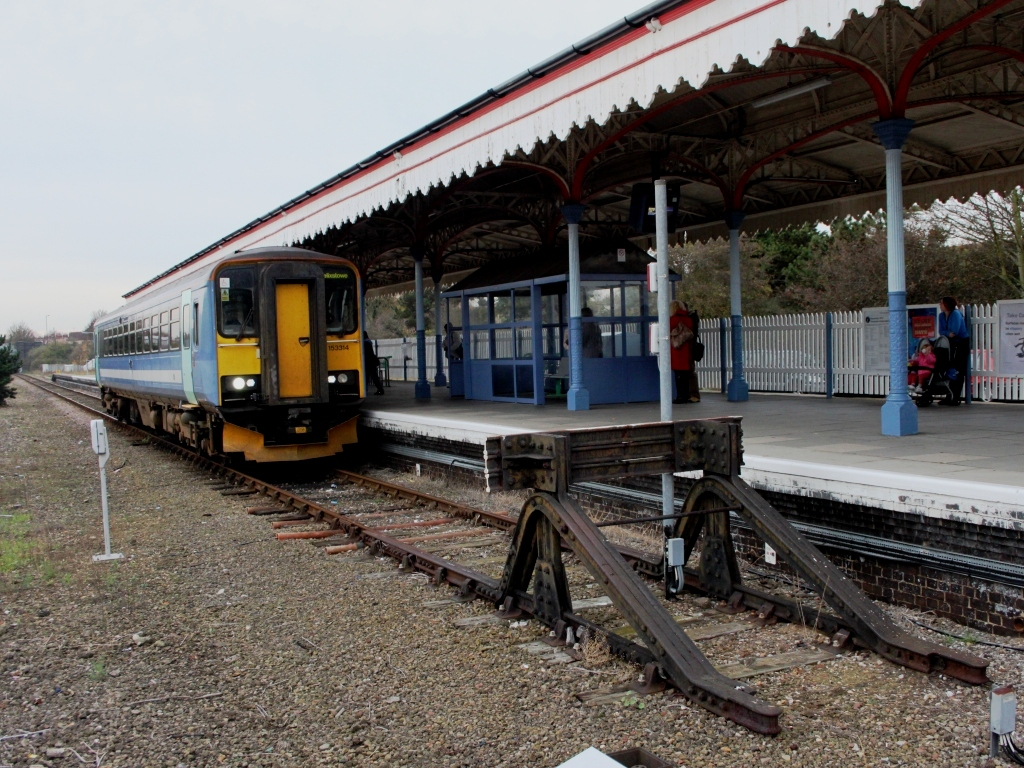
A Class 153 arrives at Felixstowe, the end of the line

As the train slows for the approach to Trimley (10.55 miles (16.98 km) from Westerfield) a line branches off on the up side then runs parallel over the level crossing and through the station before it curves away from the branch. This is the Port of Felixstowe's line to their North Freightliner Terminal which was opened in 1987. Passenger trains in both directions now use the former down platform. The derelict station building is on this, but the Trimley Station Community Trust want to see it repaired and used as a community facility. Less than one mile further on another line diverges on the up side. This is the original route of 1877 which also carries freight trains to the port. The passenger line, however, passes beneath Garrison Lane to terminate at Felixstowe station, opened in 1898 and 12.13 miles (19.52 km) from Westerfield. The single platform is on the down side of the train and can accommodate six carriages.

If we were to follow the North Curve we would find it passes through the old Felixstowe Beach station (12.62 miles (20.31 km) from Westerfield) which was closed in 1967. After passing over a level crossing the line splits into a group of sidings known as Felixstowe Creek. At the far end of these is Felixstowe Dock Junction where Network Rail's tracks end and those of the Port of Felixstowe start. Here most trains curve around into the South Freightliner Terminal but lines also diverge on the up side to the older part of the docks. It is possible to follow these to the North Freightliner Terminal and then back to Trimley, but this would involve crossing numerous level crossings on the way through the dock area.

== History ==
Ipswich and Felixstowe Railway Act 1865
- Act of Parliament
- Parliament of the United Kingdom
- Long title: An Act for making a Railway from the Westerfield Station near Ipswich of the Great Eastern Railway to Felixstow in the County of Suffolk; and for other Purposes.
- Citation: 28 & 29 Vict. c. ccciii

Dates
- Royal assent: 5 July 1865

Text of statute as originally enacted

Felixstowe Railway and Pier Act 1875
- Act of Parliament
- Parliament of the United Kingdom
- Long title: An Act for making a Railway and Pier in the county of Suffolk, to be called "The Felixstowe Railway and Pier;" and for other purposes.
- Citation: 38 & 39 Vict. c. cxlv

Dates
- Royal assent: 19 July 1875

Felixstowe Railway and Pier (New Works and Additional Powers) Act 1876
- Act of Parliament
- Parliament of the United Kingdom
- Long title: An Act to authorise the Felixstowe Railway and Pier Company to construct a Tidal Basin or Dock and other Works at Felixstowe, in the County of Suffolk; and for other purposes.
- Citation: 39 & 40 Vict. c. cxii

Dates
- Royal assent: 13 July 1876

Other legislation
- Repealed by: Felixstowe Dock and Railway Act 1956

Status: Repealed

Text of statute as originally enacted

Felixstowe Railway and Dock Act 1879
- Act of Parliament
- Parliament of the United Kingdom
- Long title: An Act to authorise the Felixstowe Railway and Pier Company to abandon the Works authorised by their Act of 1876, and to construct and maintain other Works in lieu thereof; to change the name of the Company; and for other purposes.
- Citation: 42 & 43 Vict. c. clxxvii

Dates
- Royal assent: 21 July 1879

Text of statute as originally enacted

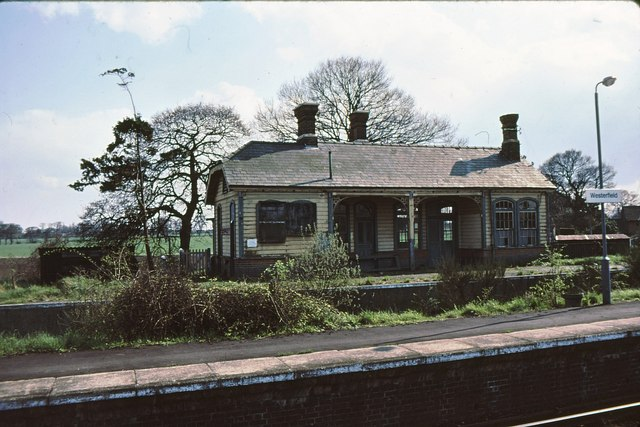
The Felixstowe Railway building at Westerfield station

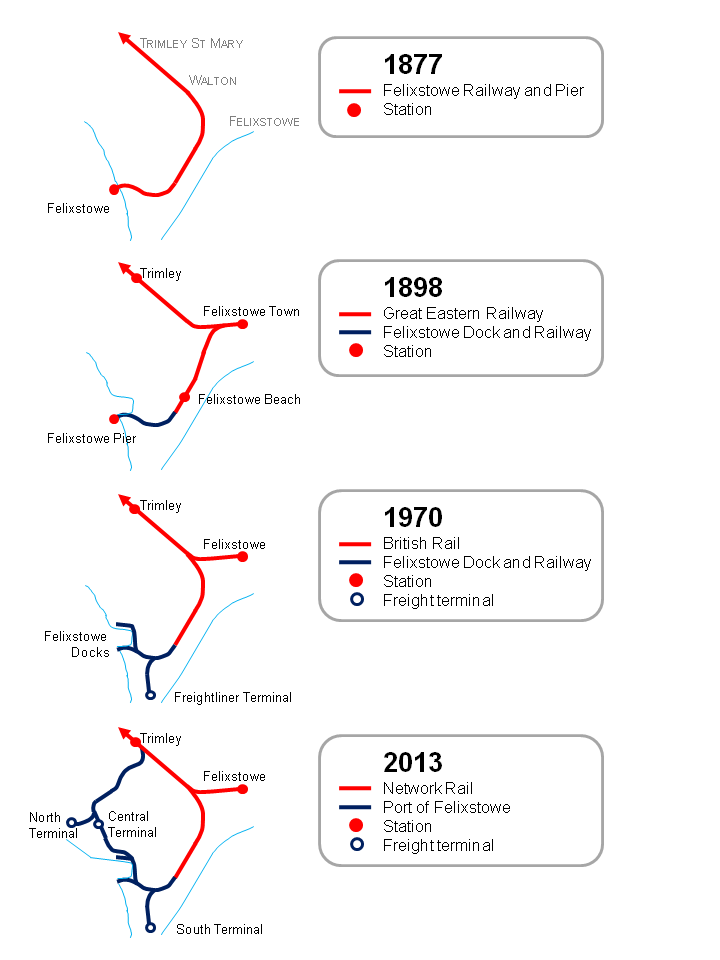
The development of railways in Felixstowe, showing (from the top) when the railway opened in 1877, and after major changes in 1898, 1970 and 2013.

The first railway proposed for the small coastal town of Felixstowe was the Ipswich and Felixstowe Railway by the Ipswich and Felixstowe Railway Act 1865 (28 & 29 Vict. c. ccciii), to run from the GER station at Westerfield to Hog Lane in Felixstowe. Tramways were authorised by the Felixstowe and Fagborough Cliff (Walton) Tramway Order 1873, and the Ipswich and Felixstowe Tramways Order 1873. Together, they were proposed from Ipswich station to Landguard Common (near the mouth of the River Orwell) and Fagborough Cliff where it would connect with the ferry to Harwich. One of the tramways' promoters, Colonel George Tomline, suggested instead that a proper railway should be built instead, running from Westerfield to a pier to be constructed at Landguard Common that had been authorised by the Felixstowe Pier Order 1873. The Felixstowe Railway and Pier Act 1875 (38 & 39 Vict. c. cxlv) was granted for this scheme on 19 July 1875 under the name of the Felixstowe Railway and Pier Company. Two years later the name was changed to the Felixstowe Railway and Dock Company when the Felixstowe Railway and Dock Act 1879 (42 & 43 Vict. c. clxxvii) authorised the construction of a dock at Languard Common close to the pier with an access channel and railway lines.

The railway was opened on 1 May 1877. Starting from Westerfield railway station, it served stations at Derby Road (Ipswich), Orwell (built primarily to serve the home of Colonel Tomline near Nacton), Felixstowe (not today's station, but one near the pier at Landguard Common). Tomline was criticised in the Suffolk Chronicle for building the stations where he "thinks people ought to be, rather than where people actually live". When a station was opened nearer to Felixstowe it was at Felixstowe Beach, close to land Tomline was looking to develop but not well placed to serve the more established part of town. It is claimed that it was also sited here to be away from the Ordnance Hotel, owned by his rival John Chevalier Cobbold.

=== Great Eastern Railway (1879–1922) ===
Great Eastern and Felixstowe Railways Arrangement Act 1887
- Act of Parliament
- Parliament of the United Kingdom
- Long title: An Act to authorise and provide for the sale and transfer to the Great Eastern Railway Company of the part of the undertaking of the Felixstowe Railway and Dock Company authorised by the Felixstowe Railway and Pier Act 1875 to change the name of the Felixstowe Railway and Dock Company; and for other purposes.
- Citation: 50 & 51 Vict. c. lxvii

Dates
- Royal assent: 5 July 1887

Text of statute as originally enacted

On 1 September 1879 the Great Eastern Railway (GER) took over operation of the line, although the Felixstowe company retained ownership until 5 July 1887 when under the Great Eastern and Felixstowe Railways Arrangement Act 1887 (50 & 51 Vict. c. lxvii) it sold the railway to the GER while retaining the dock (which had opened for traffic in April 1886) and associated railway lines, changing its name by the act to the Felixstowe Dock and Railway Company to reflect its main interests. In May 1887 another act of Parliament, the Felixstowe and Bawdsey Ferry Railway Act 1887 (50 & 51 Vict. c. xxvi), was granted for a 3 1/2-mile (5.6 km) line from Felixstowe to Felixstowe Ferry but this was never built and the scheme was abandoned in 1892 due to lack of capital.

From October 1879 some trains to Felixstowe ran through from Ipswich where connections with the GER main line were more convenient. and was running trains through to Ipswich. An additional station was opened at Trimley on 1 May 1891. Three years later the old Felixstowe engine shed near the Beach station was reopened as a carriage painting depot; about 2,000 carriages were painted here each year until it was destroyed by a fire in the 1930s.

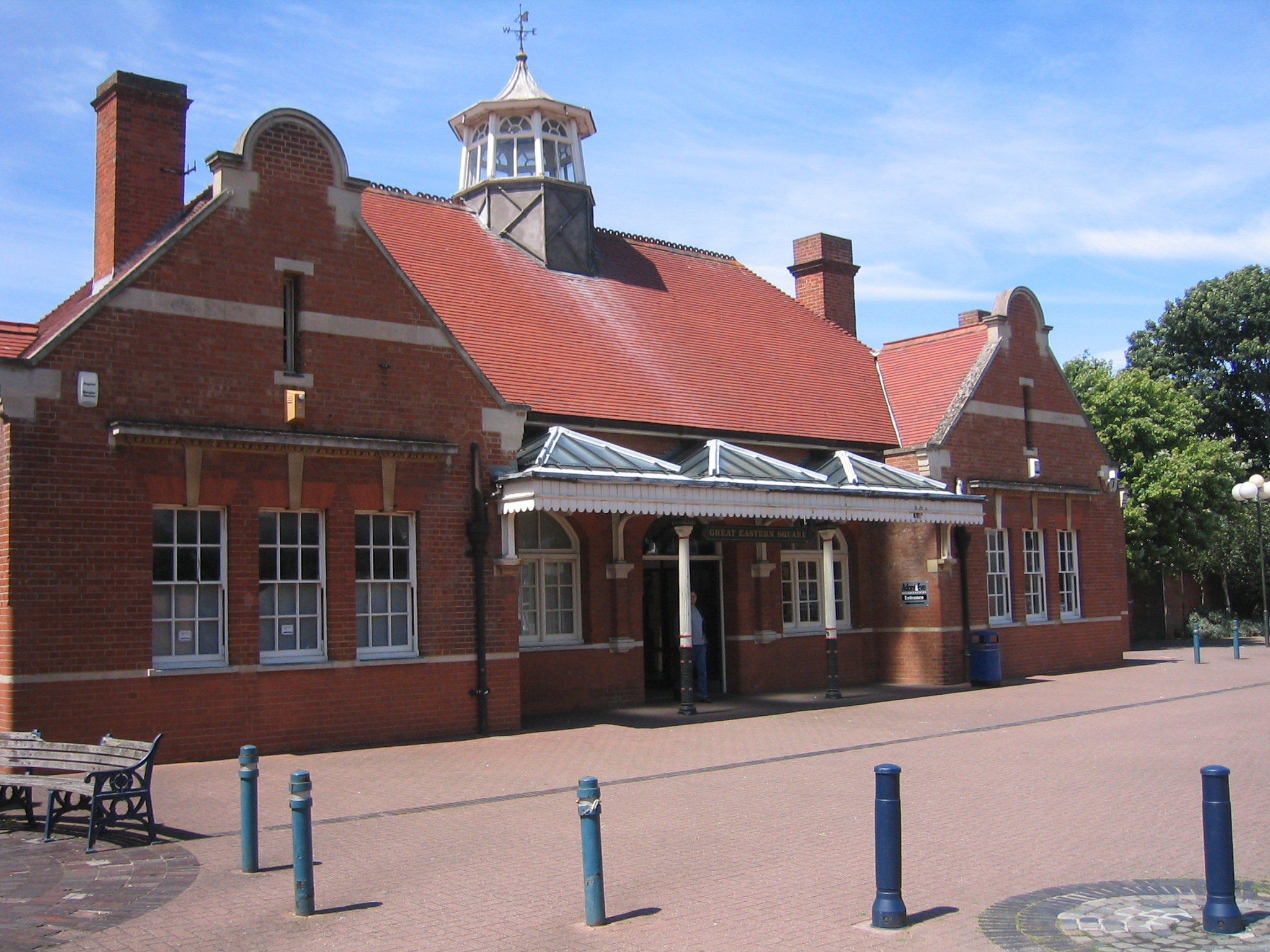
Felixstowe Town

On 13 July 1891 Empress Augusta Victoria of Schleswig-Holstein, wife of Kaiser Wilhelm II of Germany and a relative of Queen Victoria, arrived on a train at Felixstowe Beach station. She and five of her children stayed in the town on holiday until 6 August. This gave the town a boost as a holiday resort. Although the population of the town in 1891 was only 3,507 development was increasing along the higher ground north of the Beach station. In order to better serve this end of the town, the GER obtained powers in the Great Eastern Railway (General Powers) Act 1893 (56 & 57 Vict. c. lii) in June 1893 for a short deviation to the line. A terminus station was built on what is now Hamilton Road. This was opened on 1 July 1898 and named Felixstowe Town station. The direct line from Trimley to Felixstowe Beach was closed and all trains therefore had to reverse at the Town station before continuing their journey. A new 'Orwell Hotel' was opened at the same time opposite the station entrance.

More hotels opened in the town around this time including the luxury Felix Hotel on the sea front in 1903 which, in 1919, was purchased by the GER and operated as a railway hotel until it was sold in 1952. A promenade was built along the seafront in 1903 and a pleasure pier opened in 1905. Lord Claud Hamilton, the chairman of the GER, was invited to open the new Spa Pavilion in 1909. The developing resort was by now served by direct trains from London Liverpool Street station. In 1905 the 10:00 service from London (which had been introduced the previous year as a non-stop service to Lowestoft) called at Westerfield to detach carriages for Felixstowe. It was only allowed two minutes to do this (reduced to a single minute in 1908), and the Felixstowe portion continued on its way just three minutes later. A non-stop train each way between Liverpool Street and Felixstowe Town was introduced in 1906. Another fast train was introduced in 1907 with a single stop at Colchester.

Traffic increased to such a degree that in August 1912 powers were obtained by the railway company to double the line from Westerfield to Felixstowe Town. The railway had been built wide enough for this back in 1877 except for the Spring Road Viaduct in Ipswich which would need to be rebuilt. This work did not happen as World War I broke out. Felixstowe was a prohibited area and the local population was encouraged to leave the area, hotels were converted into military hospitals, and additional sidings were laid in the docks to handle the increased freight traffic.

It is known that a 9.2" coastal howitzer was based in the area between 1914 and 1915. Its precise location is unknown but believed to be in the pier station area.

=== London and North Eastern Railway (1923–1947) ===
In 1923 the Great Eastern Railway became a part of the new London and North Eastern Railway (LNER). Passenger traffic regained its pre-war volumes; Derby Road station being especially popular as it connected with the Ipswich tram system and many extra trains started there. The LNER received new powers in the London and North Eastern Railway Act 1938 (1 & 2 Geo. 6. liii) to double the line from Westerfield to Felixstowe Town and enlarge the station there. While an additional platform was provided at Felixstowe in 1939, the second track along the branch again failed to materialise due to the outbreak of World War II.

Fewer through trains were run from London than before World War I, but from 1929 until 1939 there was a regular 'Eastern Belle' Pullman service. This train had been operating as the 'Clacton Pullman' but in 1929 was rescheduled to run from London to different LNER resorts in East Anglia resorts each weekday, which resulted in it coming to Felixstowe once a fortnight. It left Liverpool Street at 11:00, took less than two hours to reach Felixstowe, and returned at 19:35. The fare was 5 shillings.

In World War II Felixstowe once again became restricted area. From September 1940 an armoured train with a 12 inches (300 mm) Howitzer was stationed on the line with a modified Class F4 locomotive to power it. The gun was one of two with the other being allocated Wrabness Station and part of the 27th Army Field Regiment (although by October the 9th Super-Heavy Battery Royal Artillery. The unit was initially based at Derby Road (and the headquarters function remained there) but the gun soon moved to Orwell. It patrolled lines in the area and sidings were provided for it at Levington Bridge and Trimley. (Note: There are conflicting accounts in Bradbury and Quayle with an article by G Balfour in the Great Eastern Railway Society Journal as to whether the siding at Trimley was actually built.) Some of the crew was at one point billeted in the waiting room at Orwell, as well as various converted rail vehicles. A gun shed was built in 1941 and still exists at Levington and the top part of the building used to slide back to allow the gun to fire.

The three LNER C14 Class locomotives that were based at Felixstowe (numbers 6123, 6128 and 6130) were put into store at Westerfield for most of the year so that traffic could be concentrated into heavier trains behind larger locomotives. Passenger trains were withdrawn from Felixstowe Pier; it was reopened on 3 June 1946.

=== British Railways (1948–1997) ===
In 1948 the LNER became the Eastern Region of British Railways. The docks were badly silted after the war and were damaged further by the North Sea flood on 1 February 1953. Passenger trains to Felixstowe Pier had been withdrawn completely from 2 July 1951.

The British Railways Modernisation Plan of 1955 proposed to electrify the branch in connection with similar work on the main line from Liverpool Street to Ipswich, although this failed to be completed north of Colchester at the time. Instead an accelerated diesel-powered service was introduced on 15 June 1959. Orwell station was closed, but the time from Ipswich to Felixstowe Town was reduced from 35 to 24 minutes which allowed a diesel multiple unit to work there and back within an hour. At the end of the year it was reported that the new service had increased the number of passengers carried by 70%. A further change was introduced on 2 November 1959 when daily services were withdrawn between Felixstowe Town and Felixstowe Beach, thereafter they were run only during the summer until the end of the 1967 season when it closed never to reopen. Earlier that year the branch had been converted to "Pay Train" operation, with all fares being collected by the guard so that staff were no longer needed at the stations other than signalmen.

In 1964 it was reported that freight traffic on the branch included agricultural machinery, bricks, chocolate, coal and coke, custard and jelly, explosives, glassware, grain, motor cars scrap metal, sugar beet, and timber. Public freight facilities had been withdrawn from Westerfield and Trimley on 13 July 1964, and from both stations at Felixstowe on 5 December 1966. The following year saw the completion of a new container terminal at the docks which was served by Freightliner trains. This helped to contribute to the docks handling 2,019,270 tons in 1969 which was more than nine times the traffic of ten years earlier. On 13 May 1970 a new direct line to Felixstowe Docks was opened. This used the same alignment as in 1877 to 1898 and removed the need of trains to reverse at Felixstowe Town. At the same time the station was reduced to just a single platform and the 1898 line from there towards the docks was closed. (Note: An account of the events of 13 May 1970 can be found in the Ipswich Land Transport Journal of June 1970)

In February 1975 there were three Freightliner trains running to the docks on weekdays and two on Saturdays. Two of these went to Parkeston which also had a Freightliner terminal, to be formed into longer trains whilst the other train went direct to Stratford and Willesden in North London. Steel coil traffic was also operating over the branch at this date as one of these trains was recorded hitting the level crossing gates at Trimley on 7 February 1975.

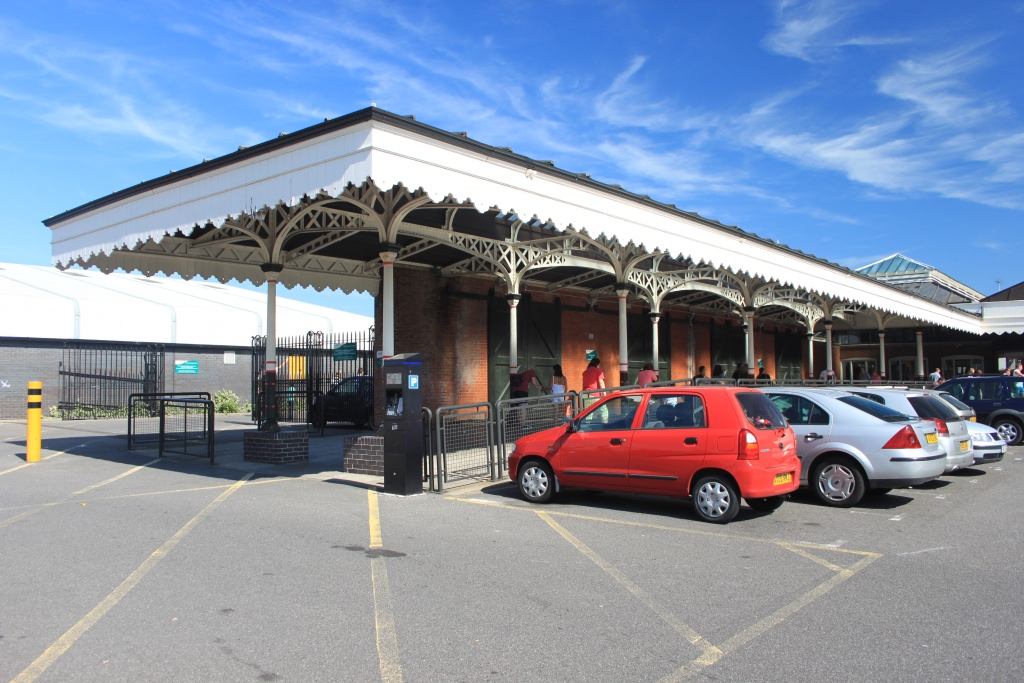
The platform at Felixstowe has been cut short to allow space for car parking.

Freight traffic to Derby Road continued into the 1980s serving a domestic coal depot and a scrap yard. Rail traffic to Cranes finished in mid-1970s and to Ransome, Sims and Jefferies in 1980.

The station buildings at Felixstowe were converted to shops after the railway stopped using them. They were listed Grade II on 23 December 1980.

Felixstowe Dock and Railway Act 1981
- Act of Parliament
- Parliament of the United Kingdom
- Long title: An Act to empower the Felixstowe Dock and Railway Company to construct works; to extend and alter the limits of the dock; to confer further powers on the Company; and for other purposes.
- Citation: 1981 c. vi

Dates
- Royal assent: 26 February 1981

Text of statute as originally enacted

In 1981 the Felixstowe Dock and Railway Company obtained the Felixstowe Dock and Railway Act 1981 (c. vi) to allow it to construct 2,591 metres (1.610 mi) of new railways. The first part to come into use was an extension of the existing dock lines to a new Northern Freightliner Terminal. Work on the remainder started in March 1986. This saw the line extended to Trimley station. When it opened on 16 February 1987 it allowed trains to reach the new terminal without crossing a series of level crossings in the dock area and also the public level crossing at Felixstowe Beach. The line to Trimley involved heavy earthworks and cost £2,000,000 but the company received a 40% grant under section 8 of the Railways Act 1974 as it would reduce road traffic.

=== Post-privatisation ===
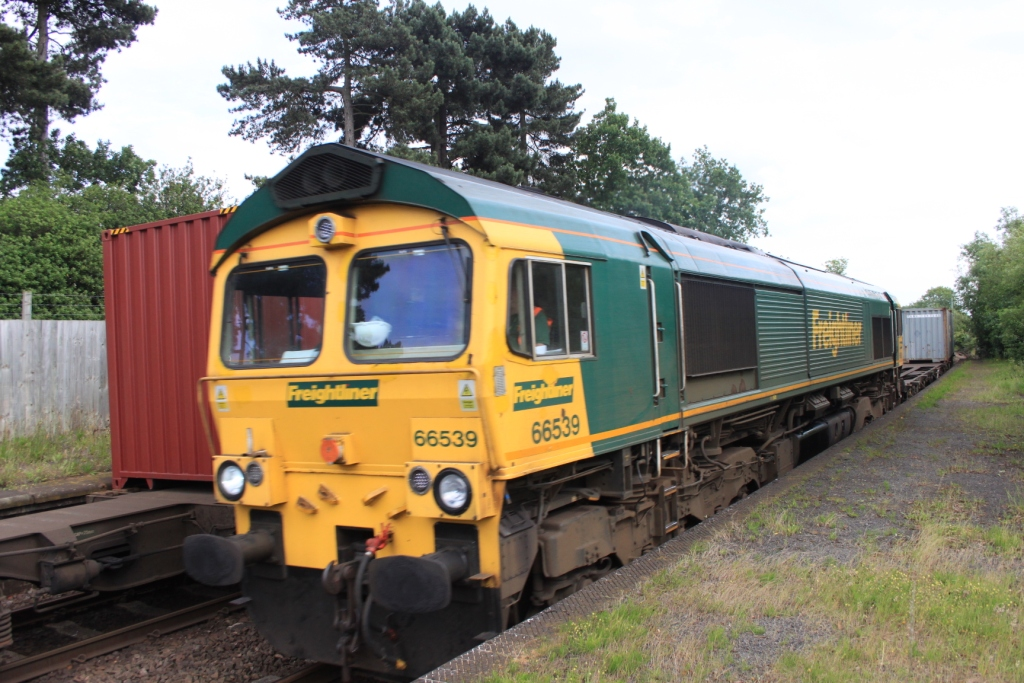
Two Freightliner trains passing at Derby Road, a thing that was impossible before the loop was lengthened in 1997

In the 1990s British Rail was privatised and the ownership of the line passed to Railtrack. When that company was wound up it was transferred to Network Rail. Passenger services were franchised, first to Anglia Railways on 5 January 1997, then to One on 1 April 2004 (which was rebranded National Express East Anglia on 22 February 2008), and then to Abellio Greater Anglia on 5 February 2012.

Railtrack initiated an upgrading of the Felixstowe branch line in 1997, the first time that it had done this speculatively in anticipation of it receiving increased revenue from freight train operators. The passing loop at Derby Road was extended so that two container trains could pass, the signalling replaced and transferred to the control of Colchester Power Signalling Box, and the line speed was increased. The aim was to allow an hourly passenger train service to operate while accommodating more freight trains. The line as far as Felixstowe Beach was maintained to passenger standard in case a service to there is resumed in the future. Electrification was again considered as most Freightliner trains were by then being worked by electric locomotives to Ipswich where they had to be changed to diesel for the short trip to Felixstowe, but the cost of this could not be justified. The work cost £8 million and was completed by June 1999.

Felixstowe Branch Line and Ipswich Yard Improvement Order 2008
- Statutory Instrument
- Parliament of the United Kingdom
- Citation: SI 2008/2512

Dates
- Made: 23 September 2008
- Commencement: 14 October 2008

Other legislation
- Made under: Transport and Works Act 1992

Text of statute as originally enacted

In 2008 the Secretary of State for Transport approved the Felixstowe Branch Line and Ipswich Yard Improvement Order 2008 (SI 2008/2512). This empowered the rebuilding of Ipswich Yard and the laying of a second track for 7,150 metres (4.44 mi) from Trimley westwards to Levington.

During the 2012 Summer Olympics Freightliner diverted ten Felixstowe trains each day through either Cambridge or Ely to free up capacity at Stratford which was next to the main venue for the games.

In 2011 Network Rail submitted plans for a new double track curve at Ipswich to be known as the Bacon Factory Curve. This avoided the necessity of any train running between Felixstowe and the Ely Line having to reverse in Upper Yard. Work started early in 2013 and was completed in March 2014 with the first train running on 24 March 2014 This is one of a number of enhancements between Felixstowe and Nuneaton which are designed to allow trains to reach the West Coast Main Line without travelling over congested lines in the London area.

In October 2017 final approval was given for a £60.4m project which includes doubling between Trimley station and Grimston Lane foot crossing. Work started on 7 April 2018 and was predicted to end in Autumn 2019. However, the work was completed by May 2019 and saw changes to the infrastructure at Trimley station where trains from the Felixstowe direction could now access the disused platform road and the establishment of a double track as far as a new junction called Gun Lane Junction just over a mile west of Trimley station. Both lines can be worked bi-directionally and with the increase in freight traffic that resulted from the additional capacity a number of level crossings were either abolished or upgraded to improve safety.

New Class 755 trains from Swiss manufacturer Stadler Rail were introduced to the line on 19 November 2019.

=== Accidents ===
On 1 September 1900, there was a collision at Felixstowe station. An up passenger train started off for Ipswich despite the signal not being set to permit this move. There was a freight train arriving at the time and the two trains collided at relatively low speed resulting in 12 injuries. The investigation was undertaken by Lt Colonel P. G. von Donop for the Board of Trade. After interviewing all the staff involved (train crew, signalman and station master) concluded that the fault lay with the driver (which he readily admitted) who had passed the signal at danger. The locomotives involved were GER 474 (a GER Class T19) on the goods train and 791 (a GER Class M15) on the passenger train. A postcard showing the post-accident scene was produced.

On 25 September 1900, at 08:45, GER Class Y14 0-6-0 locomotive 522, which was then just a year old, stopped at a signal on the Ipswich side of the level crossing at Westerfield awaiting a route to the Felixstowe branch. Shortly afterwards the boiler exploded killing driver John Barnard and his fireman William Macdonald, both of whom were based at Ipswich engine shed. The boiler was thrown 40 yards (37 m) over the level crossing and ended up on the down platform. The locomotive was reported to have had a history of boiler problems although in the official report the Boiler Foreman at Ipswich was blamed. The victims were buried in Ipswich cemetery and both their gravestones have a likeness of a Y14 locomotive carved onto them.

On 19 July 1933, a signalling error caused a locomotive to run back into a rake of carriages after it had uncoupled from them. 13 people were injured.

On 14 March 2018, a freight train collided with a car at the Routs crossing off Felixstowe Road near Nacton. One person, the driver of the car, was seriously injured. The driver of the train had no injuries.

== Signalling ==
When the line was opened the trains on its single line were regulated by a staff and ticket signalling system. This ensured that only one train at a time was on each end of the line; a loop at Orwell allowed two trains to pass. An additional section was created between Felixstowe Pier and Beach stations when the latter opened. Tyers Electric Train Tablet was in use on the line by 1891 and trains could pass at Felixstowe Beach. An additional passing loop came into use in May 1891 when Trimley station opened, and another one was created at Derby Road in November that year. Signal boxes were provided at every station and at Felixstowe Dock Junction which was the boundary between the branch and the lines of the dock company. This was closed in 1928 and replaced by a ground frame. When a train ran down to the pier it needed the signalman from Felixstowe Beach to accompany it to operate the signals.

In 1969 the section from Felixstowe towards the dock was converted to staff and ticket working so to provide more flexibility to cope with the increasing number of freight trains. The remodelling of Felixstowe in 1970 saw the closure of Felixstowe Town Signal Box, the electric signals and junction with the line to Felixstowe Beach being operated from Trimley. The passing loop at Trimley was taken out of use in 1986 when it was altered to become the connection to the Port of Felixstowe's new branch line.

In 1999 the remaining signal boxes at Westerfield, Derby Road, Trimley and Felixstowe Beach were closed, control of the branch being transferred to Colchester Panel Signal Box. Colour light signals and motor-driven points are fitted throughout, while level crossings at Trimley and Felixstowe Beach are monitored by CCTV. Signal passed at danger (SPAD) indicators were fitted at several places to act as a warning to drivers should they pass a red signal.

== Services ==
The following list provides a snapshot of timetables to show how they have changed over the years. Up trains are those going to Ipswich and down trains are those towards Felixstowe.

Year	Service summary
1877, May	4 trains to/from Westerfield plus 2 to and 1 from Derby Road calling at all stations.
1921, October	7 services from Ipswich to Felixstowe Pier and 2 more terminating at Felixstowe Beach, one of which was a through service from London.
1939, Summer	20 up and 21 down local services, a few of which only ran between Felixstowe and Derby Road, plus 3 up and 4 down services beyond Ipswich to London. One train from Felixstowe included through carriages for Peterborough. (Note: On the 1939 August Bank Holiday 43 up and 41 down trains were scheduled to run over the line resulting in a train every 20 minutes for an eight-hour period.)
1951, Summer	19 workings in each direction on weekdays with 15 up and 16 down trains on Sundays; a few trains ran only Derby Road and Felixstowe. Through coaches arrived from London on 3 trains (4 on Saturdays) and returned on 2 weekdays; 2 trains from Felixstowe Beach on Sundays ran through to London. Felixstowe Pier closed during the summer, the final service being just 2 up and 1 down train.
1969, September	13 trains between Ipswich and Felixstowe (the former Town station, the Beach station having been closed two years earlier). All trains called at Derby Road but Trimley was only served by 10 and Westerfield by just 5.
1973, Summer	13 trains each way to and from Ipswich on weekdays, 14 on Saturdays and 10 on Sundays.
2012, Summer	18 trains each way to and from Ipswich on weekdays, 17 on Saturdays and 11 on Sundays.

=== Container traffic ===
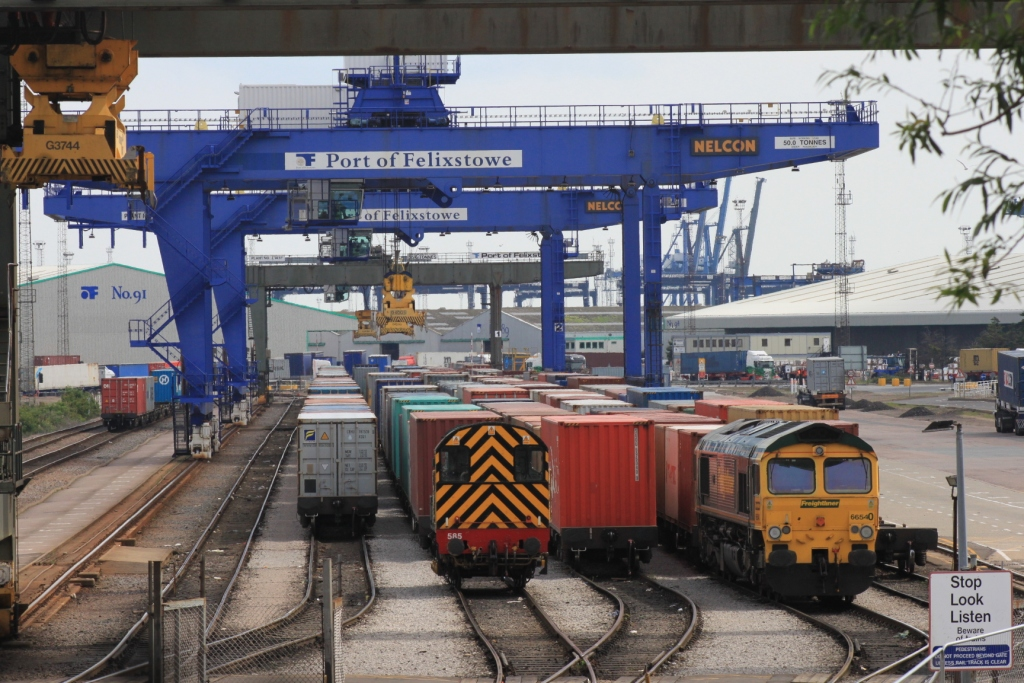
The second container terminal opened in the 1980s

At the end of 1967 there were 2 "Mini-Liner" trains from Felixstowe Freightliner Terminal to Harwich where they were combined with other Freightliner wagons for the remainder of their journey. By 1977 there were 2 regular trains working via Harwich, one to and from Coatbridge near Glasgow and the other to and from Birmingham, Liverpool and Manchester. A third train ran directly to and from Stratford in London. By 1986 this had grown to 12 to 13 trains each way each day, and the completion of the new line to the North Freightliner Terminal and additional ship berths on the new Trinity Quay in 1987 were expected to boost this to 18 to 20.

The privatisation of British Rail saw the Freightliner services transferred to a new Freightliner (UK) company, but other freight operators have now added their own services to Felixstowe which has added to the number of trains running over the branch. The first of these was operators was GB Railfreight which started a service to Selby in February 2002. On 1 October 2011 it introduced its sixth service from Felixstowe (this one running to Trafford Park in Manchester) which brought the total number of freight trains running over the branch to 29 each way each day.

A new container terminal opened on 6 June 2013 located below Fagbury Cliff at the north east end of the port. This is known as the North Terminal; the original North Terminal opened in the 1980s has been renamed the Central Terminal. The new terminal is reached from Trimley via a new junction at the north end of the Central Terminal. The nine sidings are served by three gantry cranes and will be able to handle 35-wagon trains; the Central and South terminals can only handle trains of between 21 and 24 wagons so longer trains have to be split into smaller units by shunting locomotives. To make sufficient space for such long trains, the new North terminal has been equipped with a locomotive traverser at the north east end. Once an incoming locomotive has uncoupled from its train it can move onto the traverser which then moves it to an empty track where it can then move to the other end of a train ready for departure.

The number of containers handled by rail at Felixstowe continued to grow in the 2010s with 10,764 containers in the week ending 26 September 2010 and 11,474 containers (17,211 TEUs) (Note: A TEU is a "Twenty foot Equivalent Unit", based on the standard measure of a 20-foot (6.1 m) long container, although many are 30 or 40 feet long.) in one week in 2011. In 2026 there were up to 58 trains per day which connected Felixstowe with 20 terminals around the country.

== Motive power ==
=== Felixstowe Railway and Pier ===
The line was initially worked by three 2-4-0 side tank locomotives built by the Yorkshire Engine Company. They had 4 ft 7 1/2 in (1,410 mm) driving wheels and 14 by 20 in (360 by 510 mm) cylinders. They were transferred to the Great Eastern Railway and moved to London where they worked as shunting locomotives until withdrawn in 1888. Locomotives were kept in an engine shed at Felixstowe Beach.

Number	Name	Builder's No.	GER No.
1	Tomline	328	808
2	Orwell	329	809
3	Felixstowe	330	810

The railway also possessed 19 passenger carriages and 15 goods wagons.

=== GER, LNER and BR steam ===
The GER closed the locomotive shed at Felixstowe Beach and instead operated the line with locomotives from Ipswich engine shed. Until January 1959 there was a small sub-shed at Felixstowe Town where crews were based and locomotives could receive limited servicing. The class numbers listed below refer to the LNER classification scheme unless stated to be GER or BR instead.

Type	Class	Comments
0-4-4T	—	First GER locomotive types on the line
2-4-0	E4 (GER Class T26)	Passenger trains until 1937
2-4-2T	F3 (GER Class C32)	Passenger trains
0-6-0	J15 (GER Class Y14)	Freight trains, also passenger trains in busy periods
0-6-0	J39	Occasionally used on freight trains in the 1940s
0-6-0T	J66 (GER Class T18)	Occasionally used on freight trains in the 1930s
4-6-0	B1	Occasionally used on the branch from 1947
4-4-2T	C12	Two locomotives used on the branch from 1949
4-4-2T	C14	Passenger trains from 1936
2-6-0	K3	Occasionally used on the branch but not allowed beyond Felixstowe Town
2-6-4T	L1	Passenger trains from 1950
0-6-2T	N7	Passenger trains from 1947
4-6-2	BR Standard Class 7	Through trains from London in the 1950s

Other classes made less frequent visits to the branch, often on summer passenger trains. These included LNER Class B12, B12/3, B17, D1, D9, D14/2, D15, D16, D16/3 and N5 in the 1930s. In the 1950s D16/3, F6, V1 and BR Standard 4 class locomotives were reported.

=== Diesel power ===
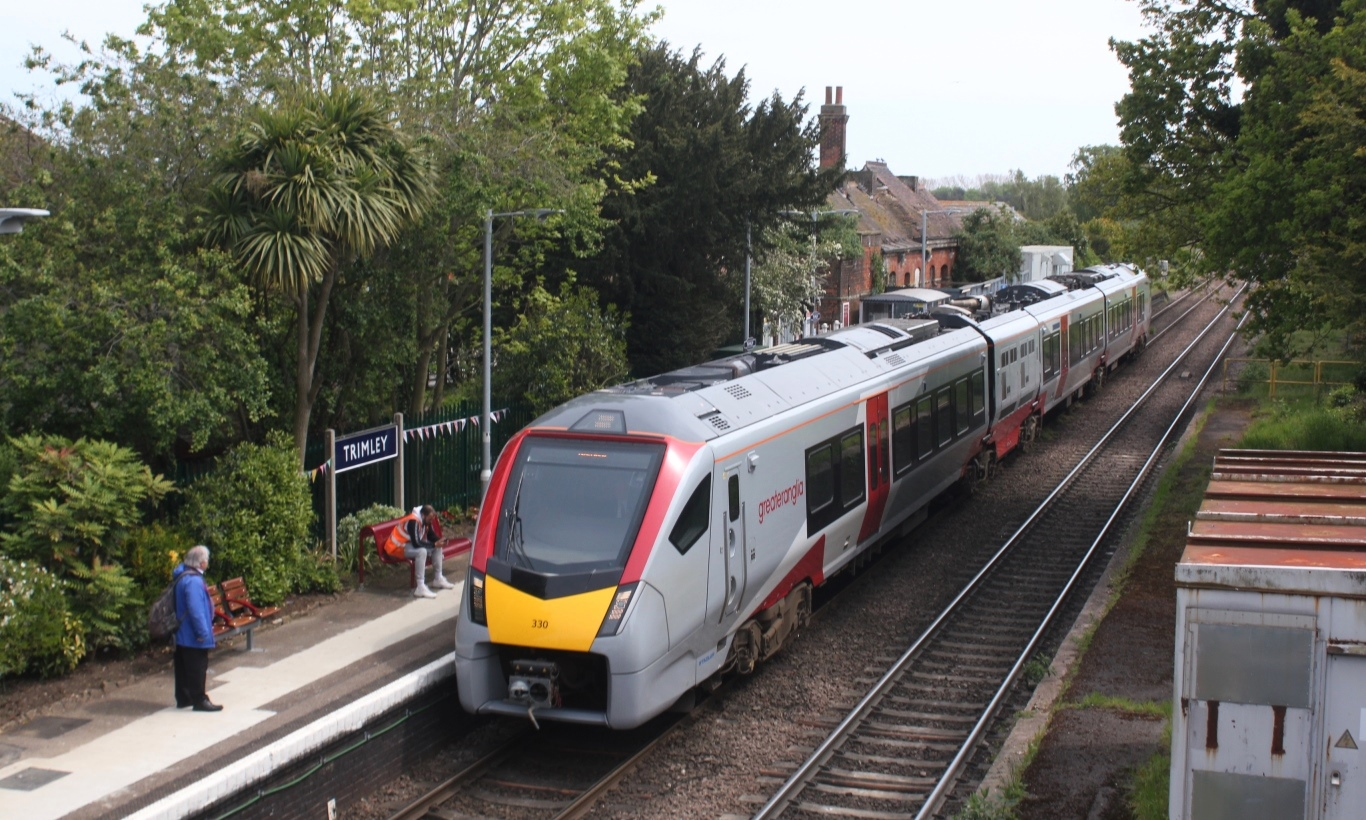
A Class 755 at Trimley in 2023

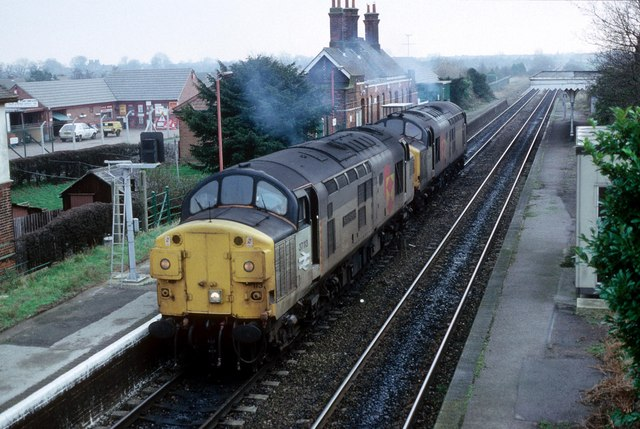
Class 37s pass through Trimley in 1991

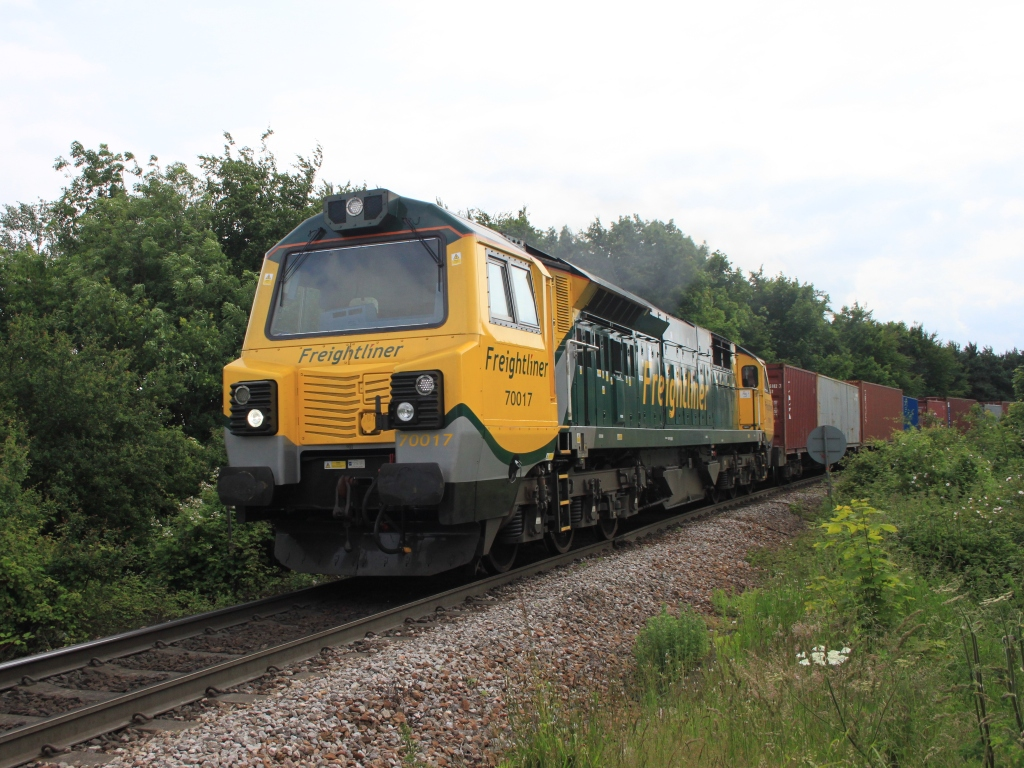
A Class 70 near North Terminal in 2012

The first diesel multiple unit (DMU) to be tested on the branch visited on 16 November 1955 but it was decided that the steam-hauled trains could handle the traffic volumes better, although eight-car DMUs did work excursion trains from the London Midland Region to Felixstowe the following year. The branch passenger service was eventually converted to DMU operation on 5 January 1959.

The first DMUs at Felixstowe were lightweight types built by Metropolitan Cammell and British Railways' Derby Works. These were soon replaced by heavier types from Gloucester Railway Carriage and Wagon (later Class 100), Metropolitan Cammell (Class 101), Birmingham Railway Carriage and Wagon (Class 104 and Cravens (Class 105). In the 1980s these were replaced by new 'Sprinter' types, initially two-car Class 150/2s and Class 156s. Since a more frequent timetable has been possible following the 1997 resignalling most trains were one-car Class 153s, although Class 170 'Turbostars' were occasionally seen.}

From 19 November 2019 Class 755/3 bi-mode units took over operation of the branch passenger services.

The first diesel locomotive believed to have visited Felixstowe was Brush Type 2 D5503 which brought an excursion train from London Liverpool Street on 12 April 1959.

Class	Operator	Comments
15	British Rail	Lighter trains in the 1960s
24	British Rail	Lighter trains in the 1960s
31	British Rail	From 1959
37	British Rail	From the 1960s
47	British Rail	From the 1960s
56	British Rail	During the 1990s
57	Freightliner	
58	British Rail	Occasional visitor in the 1990s
66	Freightliner	
66	GB Railfreight	
66	DB Schenker	
70	Freightliner	From 2010

== Private sidings ==
The following sidings have been connected to the Felixstowe branch line at various times but were not owned by the railway company.

=== Port of Felixstowe ===
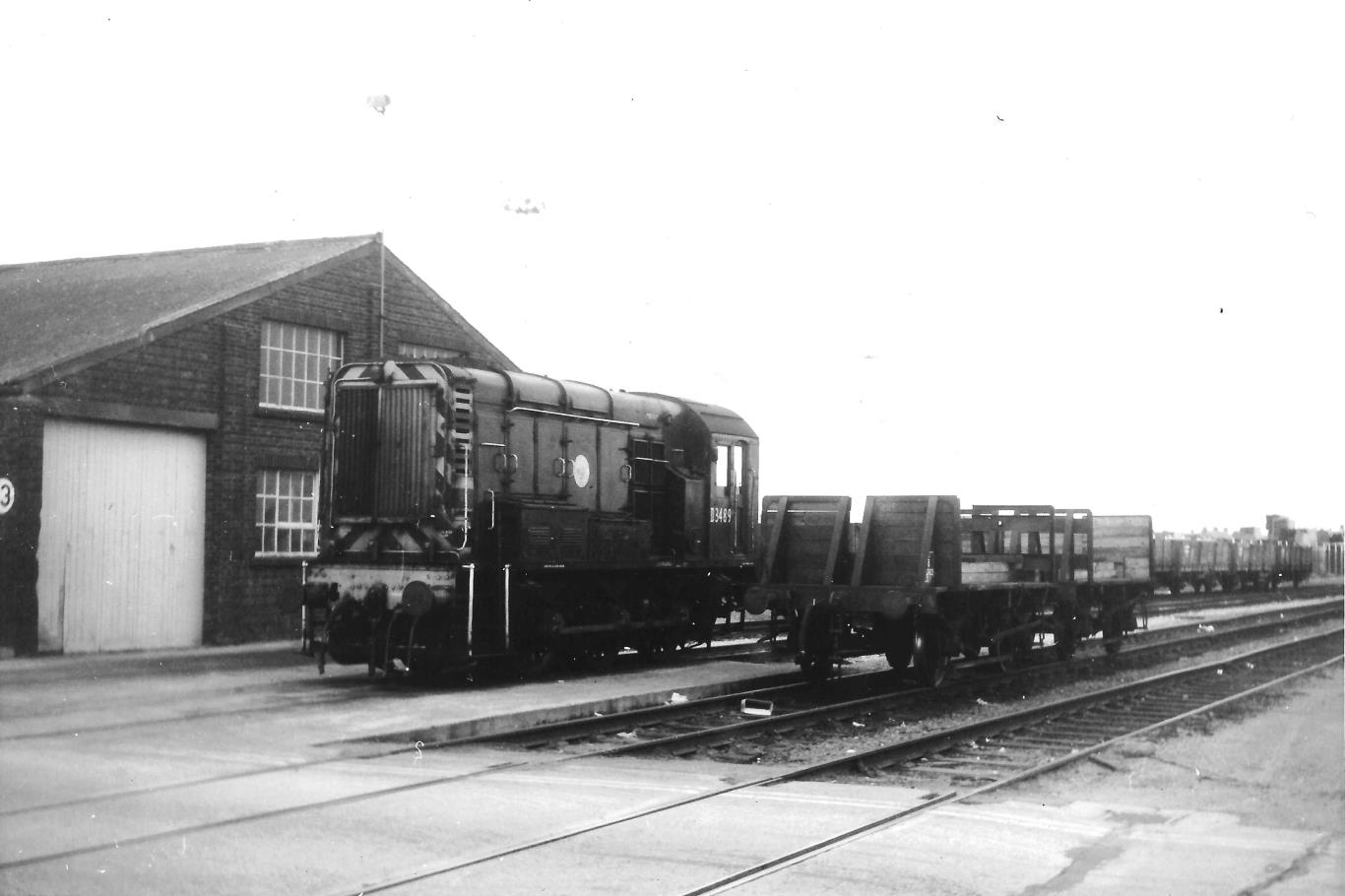
D3489 Colonel Tomline

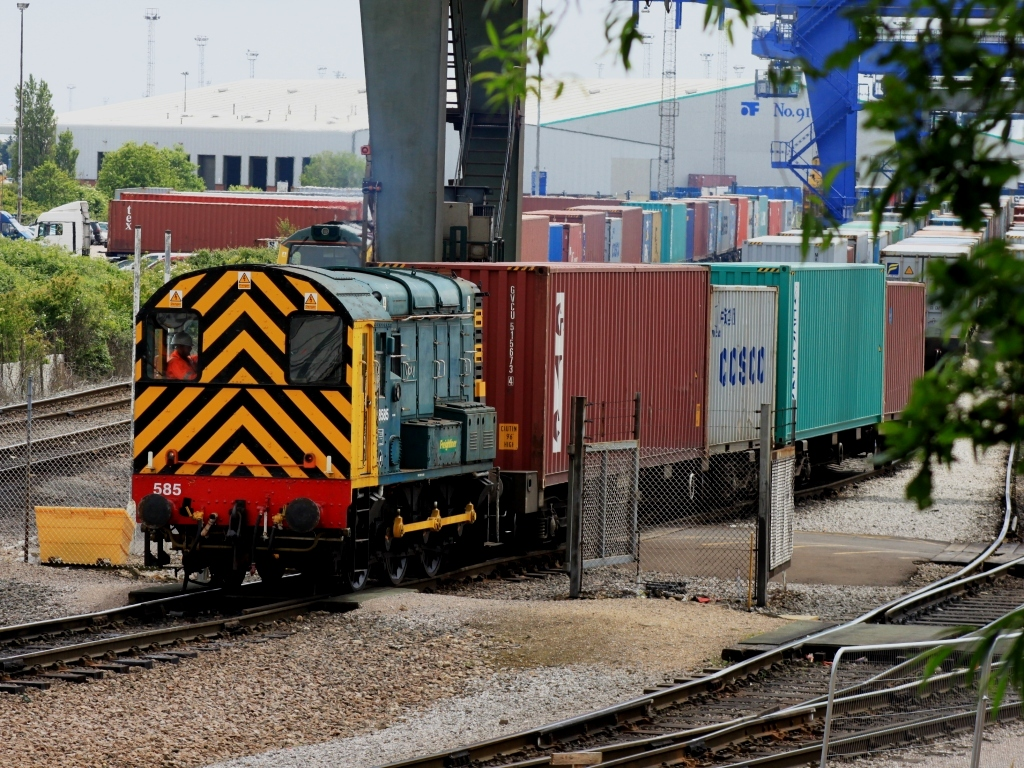
A Freightliner Class 08 shunting in the Central (formerly North) Terminal

The branch was built by the Felixstowe Railway and Pier Company. When most of the line was sold to the Great Eastern Railway, the builders retained the lines in the dock area and changed the company name to Felixstowe Dock and Railway. As the docks have expanded since the 1960s, so to have the railways to serve them. A Freightliner Terminal was opened in 1967 and this was followed by a Northern Freightliner Terminal and branch to Trimley which was completed in 1987.

In June 2013 the Northern terminal was renamed Central Terminal when a new North terminal opened on an adjacent site. This new terminal is the first in the United Kingdom that can handle 30-wagon trains capable of carrying 90 TEUs. It is equipped with three Liebherr rail mounted gantry cranes but these will be increased to six when traffic expands.

The following locomotives have worked for the Port of Felixstowe (as it is now known), most of which have been former British Rail locomotives.

Locomotive	Type	Manufacturer	Works No.	Built	At Felixstowe
D3489 Colonel Tomline	Class 10 0-6-0DE	BR Darlington		1958	1969–2001 (Note: D3489 Colonel Tomline was preserved on the Spa Valley Railway for many years before moving to the Helston Railway in Cornwall where it was hired out to the Bodmin Railway during 2024.)
DL12	0-6-0DH	Yorkshire	2911		1990 0n hire for 6 months.
08460	Class 08 0-6-0DE	BR		1958	2009–2011 (Note: 08460 was on hire to Felixstowe while it was preserved on the Colne Valley Railway but since 2014 has been operated by spot hire rolling stock companies.)
08441	Class 08 0-6-0DE	BR		1958	2011-2014 (Note: 08441 was on hire to Felixstowe while it was preserved on the Colne Valley Railway but since 2014 has been operated by spot hire rolling stock companies.)
08484 Captain Nathaniel Darell	Class 08 0-6-0DE	BR		1958	2007–2013 (Note: 08484 had been on hire at Felixstowe for a short while in 2006.)
08511	Class 08 0-6-0DE	BR		1958	2014–2015
08683	Class 08 0-6-0DE	BR		1959	2011

Freightliner UK also keep a Class 08 at Felixstowe for shunting its trains. The locomotive is exchanged from time to time for maintenance purposes.

=== Cranes ===
In 1927 American firm Crane-Bennett opened a rail served works 1 3/4 miles (2.8 km) south of Derby Road. Rail traffic finished in mid-1970s.

The following locomotives are known to have worked at Cranes.

Locomotive	Type	Manufacturer	Works No.	Built	At Cranes
	0-4-0ST	Avonside	1878	1921	1930–1952
1490	0-4-0ST	Peckett	2129	1952	1952–1970
Thetis	0-4-0DM	Robert Stephenson and Hawthorns	7815	1954	1954–1970
2589	0-4-0DH	Andrew Barclay	472	1961	1970–1976

=== Ransomes ===
In 1950 a private siding was installed at Ransomes, Sims & Jefferies' works 1 3/4 miles (2.8 km) south of Derby Road. Rail traffic finished in 1980.

The following locomotives are known to have worked at Ransomes.

Locomotive	Type	Manufacturer	Works No.	Built	At Ransomes
	4wDM	Ruston and Hornsby	252825	1947	1947–1962
	4wDM	Ruston and Hornsby	466629	1962	1962–1980 (Note: Ruston and Hornsby 466629 remained at Ransomes until 1984 then moved to the North Norfolk Railway. In 2007 it moved to the North Dorset Railway at Shillingstone in Dorset. In 2013 it moved to Whitwell and Reedham station)

== Film and television ==
Felixstowe Town featured in the 1954 film The Sea Shall Not Have Them with two scenes of an Ipswich-based LNER Class F6 2-4-2T locomotive arriving at the station. The branch line featured in the final episode of Michael Palin: Around the World in 80 Days. Palin was given a lift by a lorry driver from Felixstowe Port to Felixstowe Town Station, and is shown boarding a class 101 DMU to Ipswich.

An episode of Michael Portillo's third BBC Great British Railway Journeys finished at the Port of Felixstowe where the growth of railways in the docks was explained.
