= Orwell railway station =

Disused railway station in Suffolk, England

Orwell
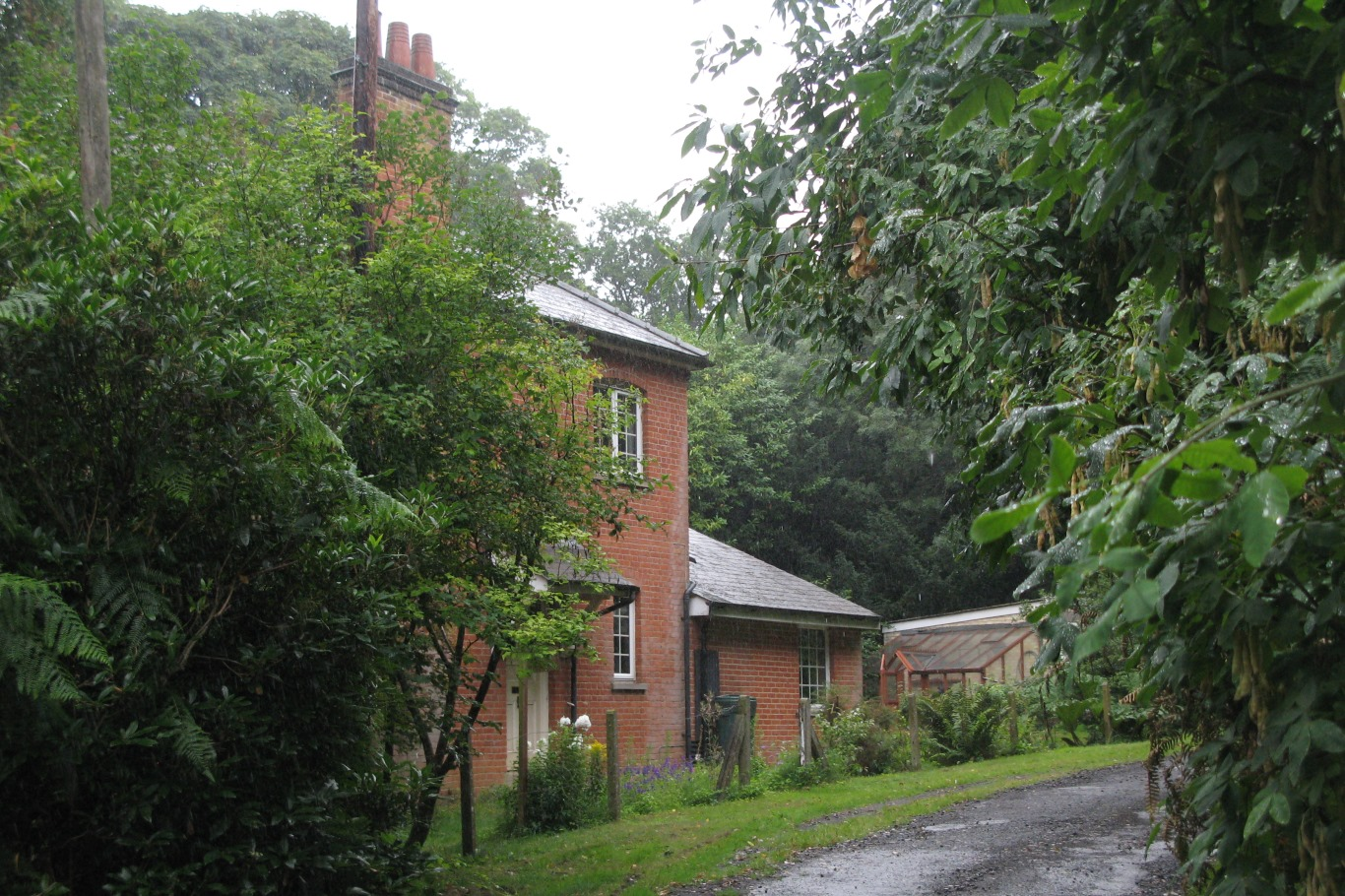
- The former station in 2017

General information
- Location: Nacton, East Suffolk; England
- Coordinates: 52.0229°N 1.2414°E
- Platforms: 2

Other information
- Status: Disused

History
- Original company: Felixstowe Railway and Pier Company
- Pre-grouping: Great Eastern Railway
- Post-grouping: London and North Eastern Railway

Key dates
- 1 May 1877: Opened
- 14 June 1959: Closed
Location

Orwell railway station was on the Felixstowe Branch Line near the small village of Nacton, Suffolk, England. It was situated between Derby Road and Trimley stations and was opened in 1877 but was closed in 1959 to allow an acceleration of the service to the remaining stations. The former station building is now a private residence near to the modern Seven Hills crematorium.

== History ==
The line from Westerfield to Felixstowe Pier was opened on 1 May 1877 by the Felixstowe Railway & Pier Company. This had been promoted by Colonel George Tomline who was criticised in the Suffolk Chronicle for building the stations where he "thinks people ought to be, rather than where people actually live". This was especially true of Orwell, which was situated close to Tomline's home at Orwell Park.

On 1 September 1879 the Great Eastern Railway (GER) took over operation of the line, although the Felixstowe company retained ownership until 5 July 1887 when it sold the railway to the GER. This in turn formed part of the London & North Eastern Railway from 1923 and then the Eastern Region of British Railways in 1948.

An armoured train with a 12 inches (300 mm) Howitzer was stationed on the line with a modified Class F4 locomotive to power it. It was initially based at Derby Road but soon moved to Orwell. It patrolled lines in the area and sidings were provided for it at Levington and Trimley.

An accelerated diesel-powered service was introduced on the line on 15 June 1959. The little-used Orwell station was closed from that date to help reduce the time taken for a journey between Ipswich and Felixstowe Town, from 35 to 24 minutes. This allowed a diesel multiple unit to work from one terminus to the other within one hour. At the end of the year it was reported that the quicker service had increased the number of passengers carried by 70%. The former station building became a private residence.

== Description ==
Orwell was located at milepost 78 from London Liverpool Street, just to the east of Orwell level crossing and approximately halfway between Derby Road and Trimley.

The station was the only passing place for trains when the line opened in 1877, with a platform on each track. The station building was on the westbound (Ipswich) platform. A goods siding was situated behind this and was accessed from the east (Felixstowe) end.

	Former station	
Derby Road	Great Eastern Railway Felixstowe Branch Line	Trimley
