= Port of Felixstowe =

UK container port in Felixstowe

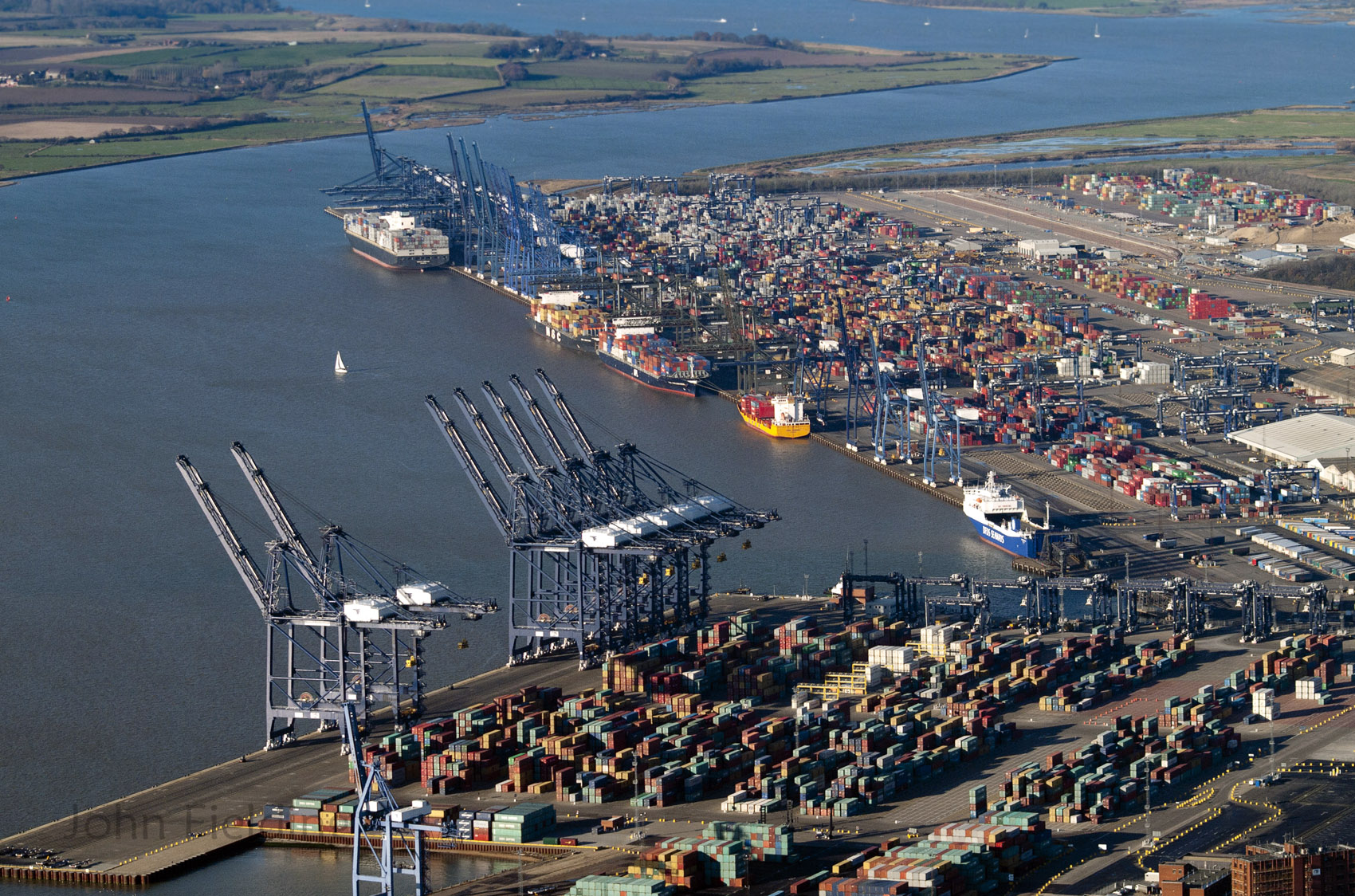
- Interactive map of Port of Felixstowe

Location
- Country: United Kingdom
- Location: Felixstowe
- Coordinates: 51.955°N 1.310°E

Details
- Opened: 1875
- Operated by: Felixstowe Dock and Railway Company
- Owned by: Hutchison Port Holdings
- Type of Harbor: Container port
- Size: 3,383 ha (8,360 acres)
- No. of berths: 10 (9 Active)
- Employees: 3,500 approx. (2017)
- Chief Executive Officer: Clemence Cheng

Statistics
- Vessel arrivals: 3,000 sea
- Website portoffelixstowe.co.uk

The Port of Felixstowe, in Felixstowe, Suffolk, is the United Kingdom's largest container port, dealing with 48% of Britain's containerised trade. In 2017, it was ranked as 43rd busiest container port in the world and 8th in Europe, with a handled traffic of 3.85 million twenty-foot equivalent units (TEU). In 2019 it was ranked the UK's 7th busiest port.

The port is operated by the Felixstowe Dock and Railway Company, which was set up under an act of Parliament, the Felixstowe Railway and Pier Act 1875 (38 & 39 Vict. c. cxlv), and so is one of the few limited companies in the UK that do not have the word "Limited" in their name. Much of the land on which it sits is owned by Trinity College, Cambridge, which in the 1930s bought some land near Felixstowe which included a dock that was too small to be included in the National Dock Labour Scheme. In 1967, it set up Britain's first container terminal for £3.5m in a deal with Sea-Land Service. Because container shipping is much more economically efficient in bulk, this early start led to it becoming the UK's largest container port, despite its previous insignificance to the shipping market.

By 1980, Felixstowe had become the largest container port in the UK. In April 1981, Dooley and Walton, two new terminals started operation. Walton was owned by OOCL and operated separately. The port was purchased by P&O in 1987.

Felixstowe is owned by Hutchison Port Holdings (HPH) and has always been privately owned. In 1951, Gordon Parker, an agricultural merchant, bought the Felixstowe Dock and Railway Company, which at the time was handling only grain and coal. In 1976, Felixstowe was bought by European Ferries. In June 1991, P&O sold Felixstowe to Hutchison Whampoa of Hong Kong for £90m. Walton terminal was amalgamated and OOCL became a 25% shareholder. In June 1994, Hutchison Whampoa's Hutchison International Port Holdings bought out Orient Overseas International's 25% stake in Felixstowe for £50m. On 21 August 2022, the first strike in thirty years occurred when about 1,900 Unite members walked out in a dispute over pay. In March 2025, Hutchison Port Holdings announced a majority sale of its international business including Felixstowe to a syndicate led by BlackRock.

The port has its own Port of Felixstowe Police, fire, and ambulance services.

== Description ==
=== Terminals ===
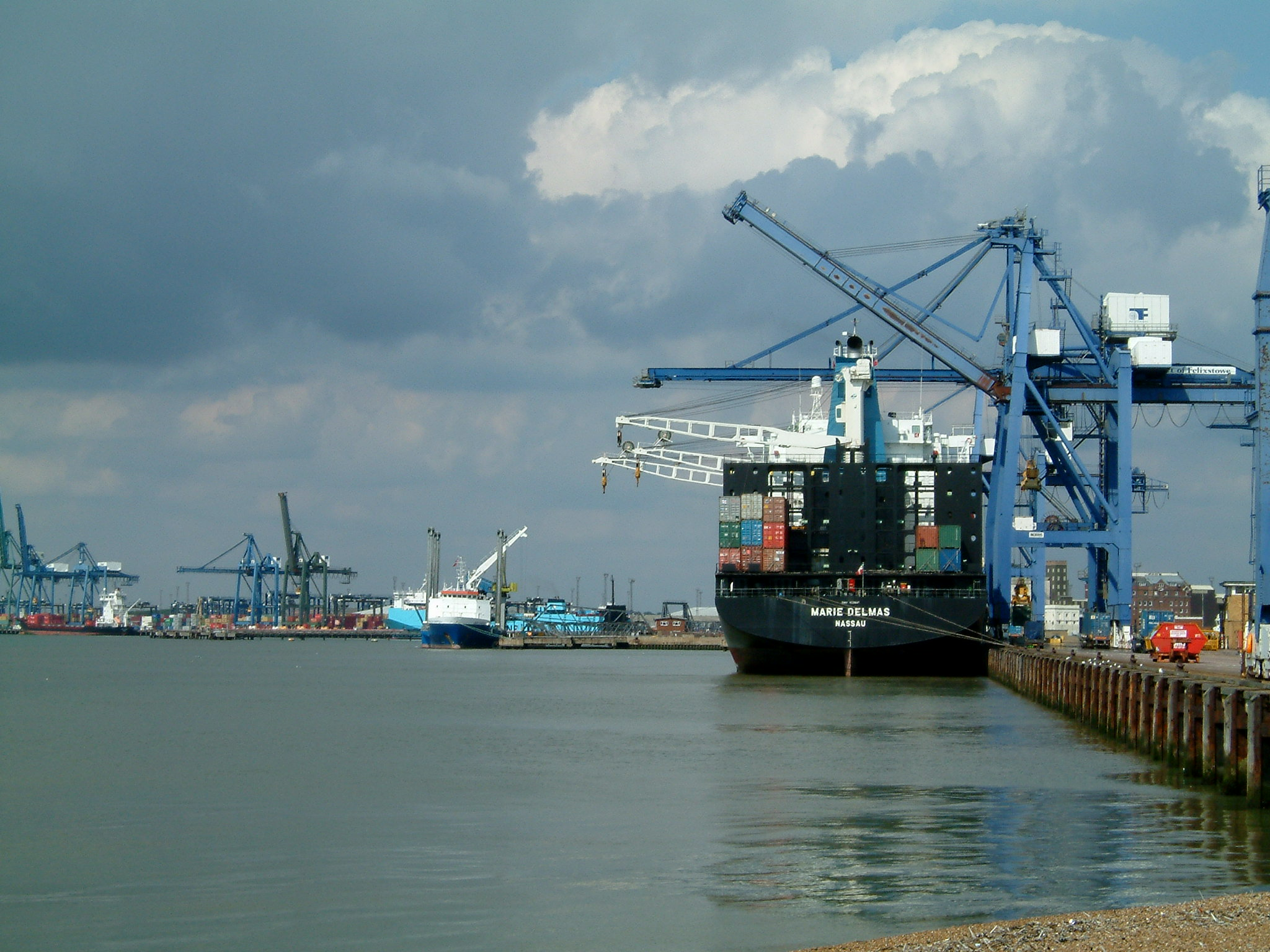
Landguard Terminal in the foreground with Trinity Terminal in the background

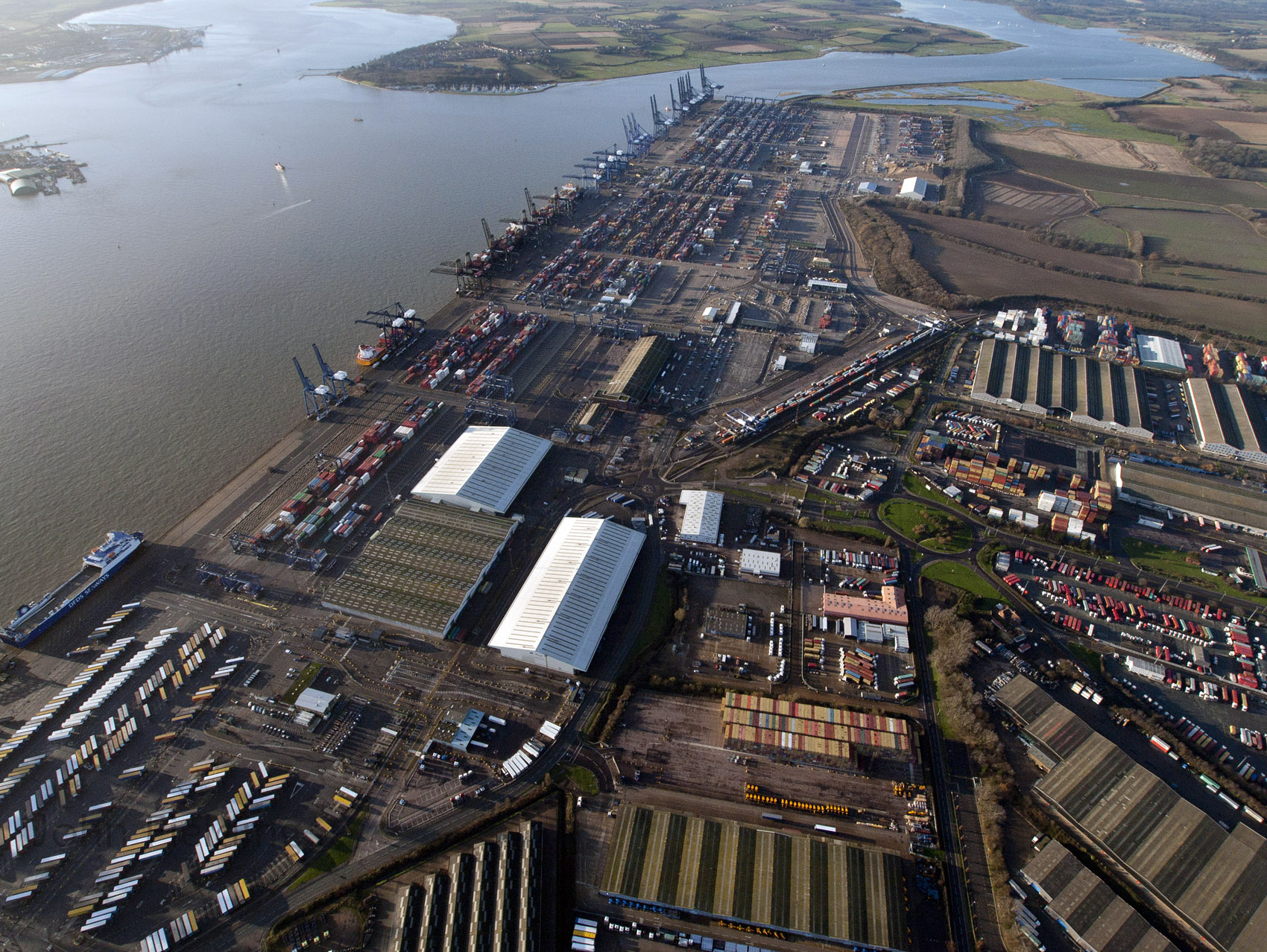
Port of Felixstowe

The port has two main container terminals, Trinity and Landguard, as well as a roll-on/roll-off terminal.

There is a continuous quay of over 2.3 kilometres (1.4 miles), equipped with 29 ship-to shore gantry cranes. The main navigation channel is dredged to 14.5 m (48 ft) below chart datum, with a maximum depth of 15 m (49 ft) alongside the quay. This allows Felixstowe to accommodate the world's latest generation of deep-draughted post-Panamax vessels and the much larger Maersk Triple E class, launched in 2013 and capable of carrying 18,000 TEUs.

=== Transport connections ===
The A14 connects the port to the English Midlands and the M6, the north via the M1 and M6 and A1 and via the A12 to London. The port (as simply "Felixstowe") is signed from as far away as M6 junction 1 for Rugby.

Each terminal has its own rail terminal which connects to the Felixstowe branch line. The second rail container terminal opened on 16 May 1983.

=== Seafarers and crew welfare ===
Seafarers' welfare charity Apostleship of the Sea, which provides practical and pastoral support to seafarers, has a port chaplain based at Felixstowe port.

== Current developments ==
=== Felixstowe South ===
Felixstowe South Reconfiguration
- Location: Felixstowe
- Proposer: Hutchison Whampoa

In 2008, work began on the construction and reconfiguration of Felixstowe South terminal originally aimed at creating 1,300 m (4,300 ft) of quay served by 12 new ship-to-shore gantry cranes. The construction stopped at a 730 m (2,400 ft) quay, which was completed and opened in 2011. A 190 m (620 ft) finger extension was then built between April 2014 and November 2015, followed by an infilling operation to reclaim 3.2 hectares (7.9 acres) of seabed behind the finger quay. The reshaped and extended quay is now 920 m (3,020 ft) long, and its 2 berths have a depth of 18 m (59 ft) below chart datum.

=== Felixstowe and Nuneaton freight capacity scheme ===
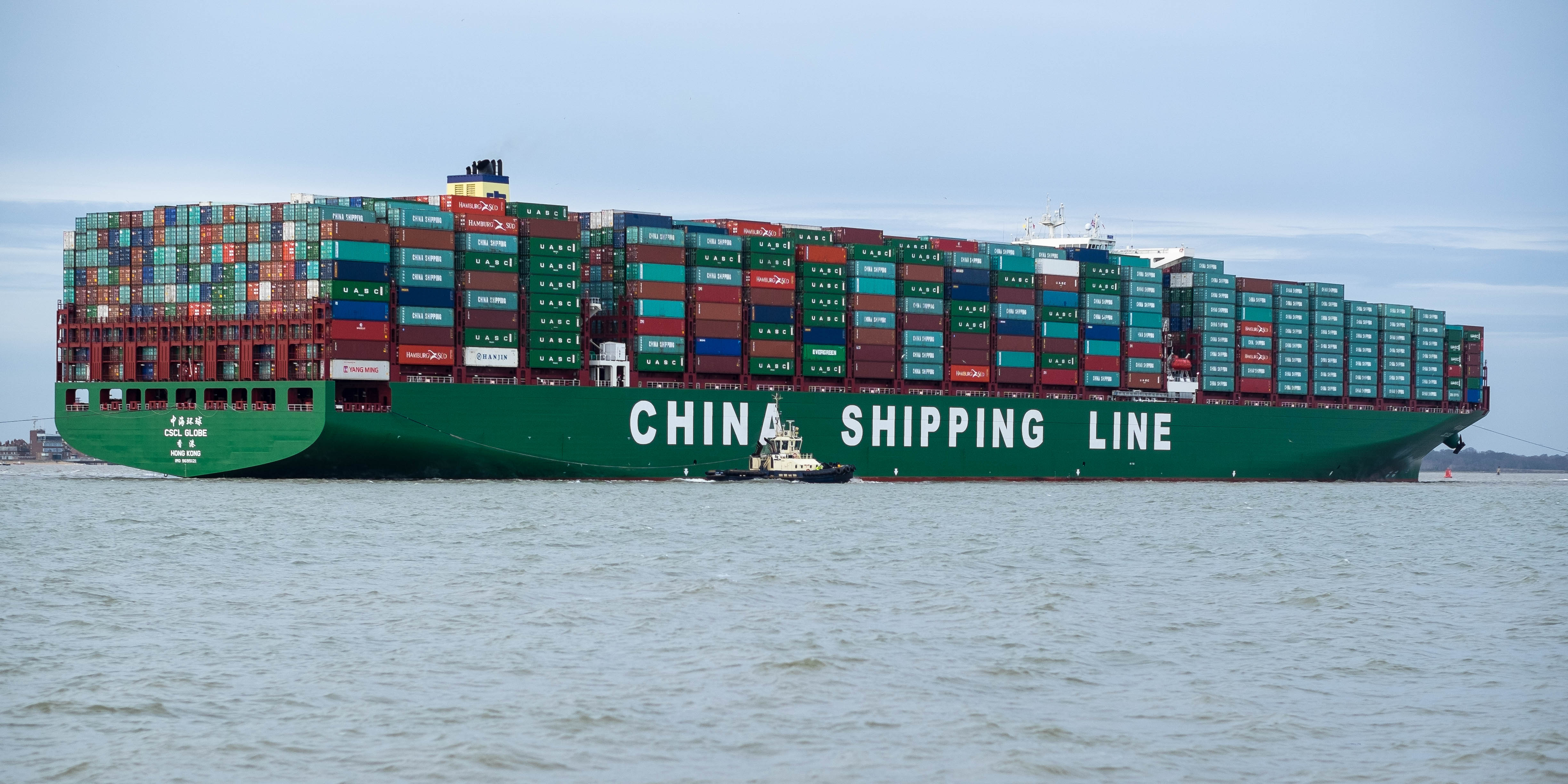
CSCL Globe, the largest container ship at the time, arriving at the port in January 2015

The railway track between Felixstowe and Nuneaton has been upgraded to allow for more freight trains by clearing the route to W10 loading gauge, allowing 'Hi-cube' shipping containers to be carried between the Port of Felixstowe and the West Coast Main Line at Nuneaton. The West Coast Main Line had previously been cleared to W10 and the route from Nuneaton to Birmingham was already cleared to W12.

This work will accommodate additional freight traffic as a result of 'Felixstowe South' expansion at the Port of Felixstowe. It will also allow the newer high-cube containers to be carried by train - and the percentage of these containers is expected to increase from 30% in 2007 to 50% in 2012. Network Rail completed the gauge enhancement from Ipswich to Peterborough in 2008. Work should be completed by 2014 at an estimated cost of £291 million.

=== Copdock Roundabout ===
As part of the Felixstowe South development, Hutchison Ports will provide financial support intended to increase capacity at the Copdock interchange (J55) between the A14 and the A12.

== 2022 dockers' strike ==
The dispute followed the Felixstowe Dock and Railway Company offering a pay increase of 5%. Unite reported that this equated to a real-terms pay cut with retail price inflation at 11.9%. In 2021, dock workers received a below inflation pay increase of 1.4%. In July 2022, Unite members at Felixstowe voted on industrial action and workers recorded a 92% yes vote on an 81% turnout. In August, dock workers walked out from the site in the first industrial action of its kind in 30 years. Coverage of the industrial action revealed that some Felixstowe dockers relied on the support of food banks and were struggling to make mortgage payments. Trade union communications by Unite used the hashtag #DockersDeserveBetter.

In a press statement, General Secretary of Unite, Sharon Graham said:

The bottom line is this is an extremely wealthy company that can fully afford to give its workers a pay rise. Instead it chose to give bonanza pay outs to shareholders touching £100 million.

On 24 August footage and photographs recorded a port worker carrying a Unite the Union flag surfed in front of an Evergreen Marine Corp container ship. The footage was published on Twitter by trade unionist and Labour councillor Lauren Townsend and included a sample from AC/DC's Back in Black.
