= Barkingside tube station =

London Underground station

Barkingside
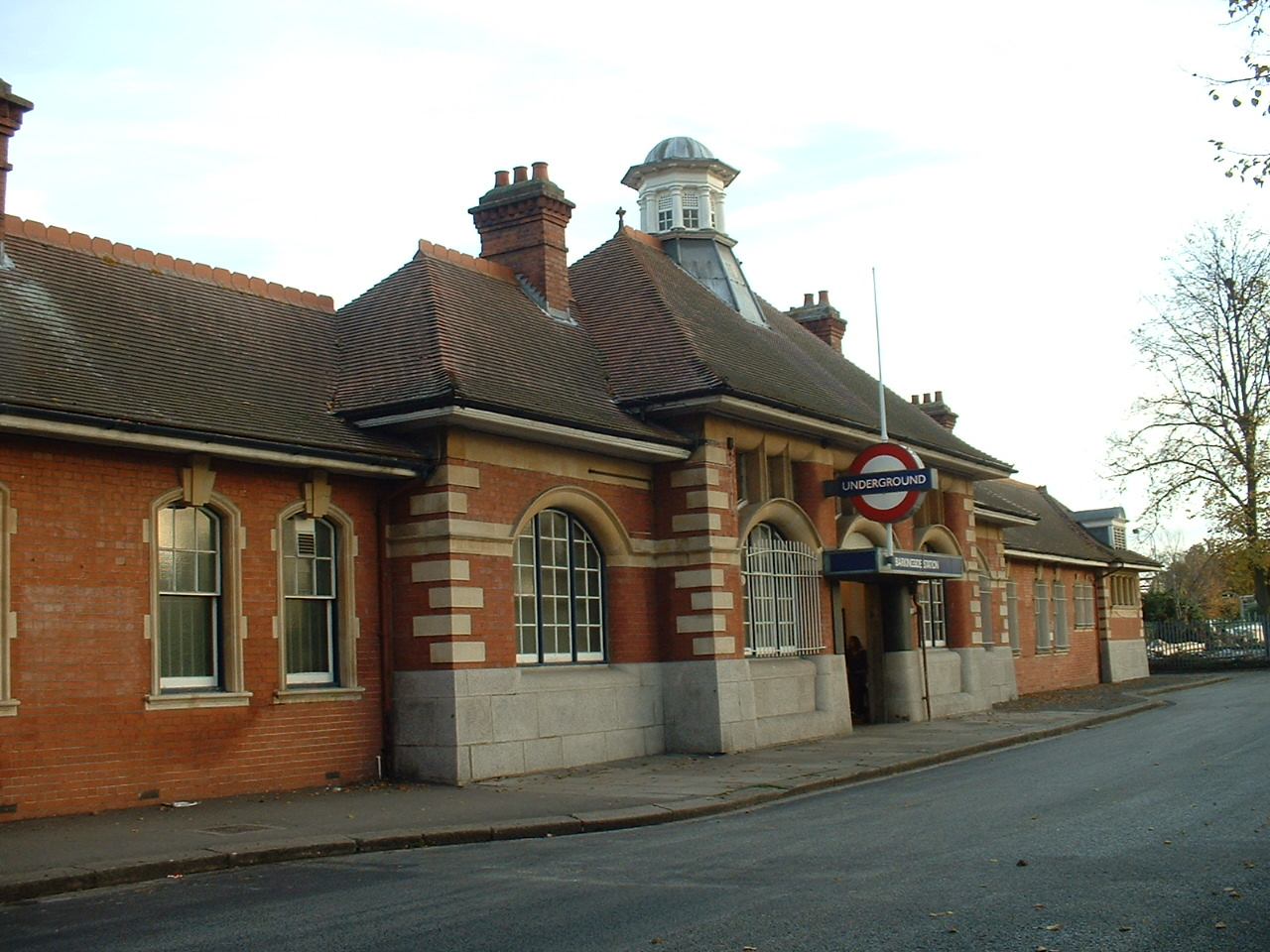
- Station entrance
- Interactive map of Barkingside

General information
- Location: Barkingside
- Local authority: London Borough of Redbridge
- Managed by: London Underground
- Number of platforms: 2
- Accessible: Yes (Eastbound only)
- Fare zone: 4

London Underground annual entry and exit
- 2021: ▼0.65 million
- 2022: ▲1.12 million
- 2023: ▲1.17 million
- 2024: ▲1.20 million
- 2025: ▼1.15 million

Key dates
- 1 May 1903: Opened (GER)
- 21 May 1916: Closed
- 30 June 1919: opened
- 29 November 1947: Closed (LNER)
- 31 May 1948: Opened (Central line)
- 4 October 1965: Goods yard closed

Listed status
- Listing grade: II
- Entry number: 1081012
- Added to list: 22 February 1979

Other information
- External links: TfL station info page
- Coordinates: 51.5848°N 0.0886°E

Barkingside is a London Underground station. It is located on the eastern edge of Barkingside in east London, England. The station is on the Hainault loop of the Central line between Newbury Park and Fairlop stations, and has been in London fare zone 4 since 2 January 2007.

== History ==
The station originally opened on 1 May 1903, as part of a Great Eastern Railway (GER) branch line from Woodford to Ilford via Hainault. This "Fairlop Loop", designed to stimulate suburban growth had a chequered history and Barkingside station was temporarily closed to passenger traffic, due to World War I economies, from 21 May 1916 until 30 June 1919. As a consequence of the Railways Act 1921, the GER was merged with other railway companies in 1923 to become part of the London and North Eastern Railway (LNER).

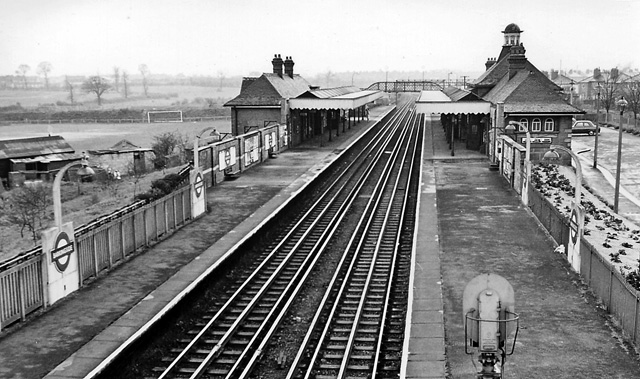
The station in 1961

As part of the 1935–1940 "New Works Programme" of the London Passenger Transport Board the majority of the loop was to be transferred to form the eastern extensions of the Central line. Although work commenced in 1938 it was suspended upon the outbreak of the Second World War in 1939 and work only recommenced in 1946. Steam train services serving Barkingside were suspended on 29 November 1947 and electrified Central line passenger services, to Central London via Gants Hill, finally commenced on 31 May 1948. The line from Newbury Park to Hainault through Barkingside had been electrified for empty train movements to the new depot at Hainault from 14 December 1947.

== Design ==
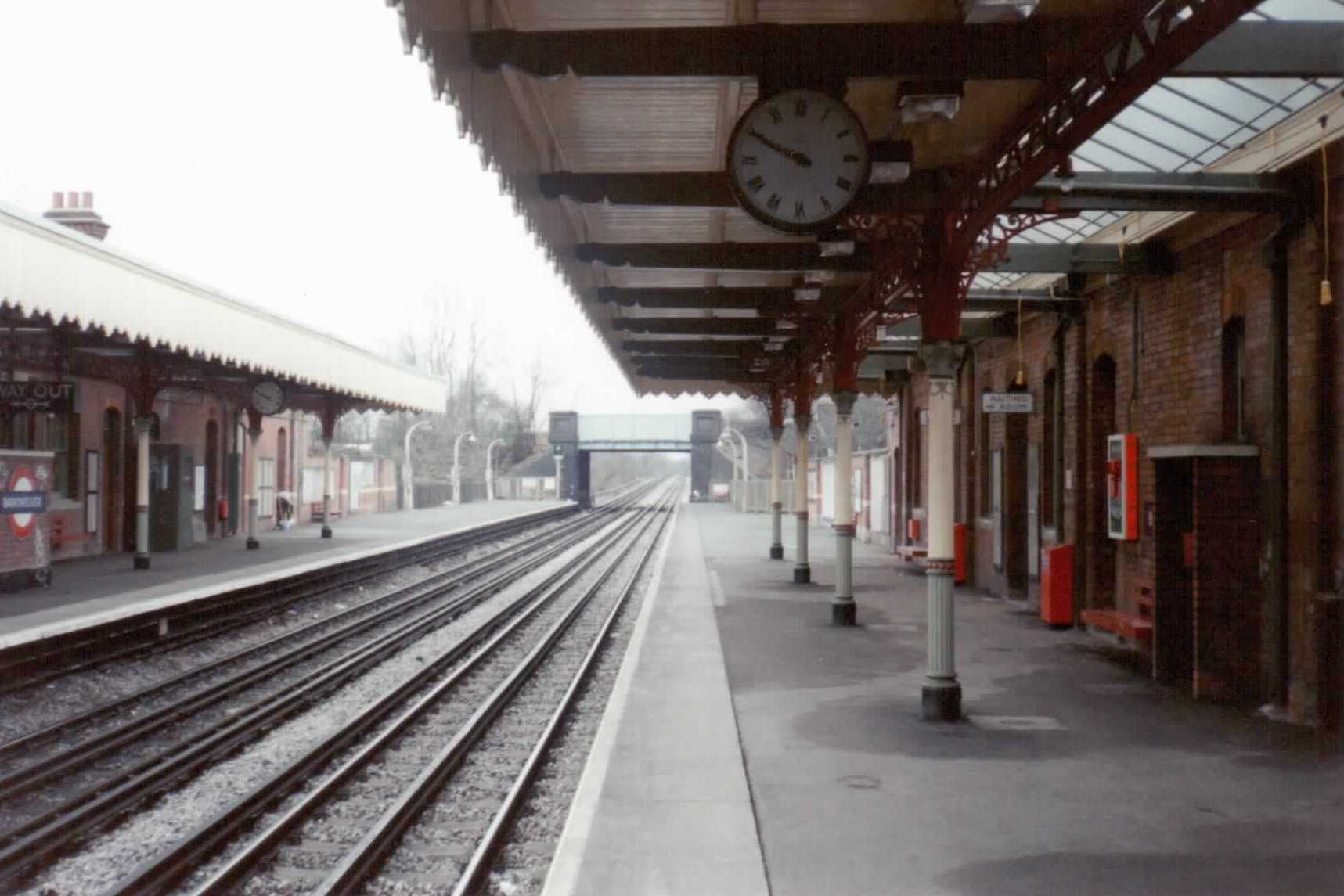
Barkingside station, with the GER ornate canopies still in place.

The station contains two platforms, one for each direction.

Few alterations took place to the station upon transfer to the Underground. Barkingside station is a "Grade II" listed building, marking it as a structure of architectural significance. Probably designed under the direction of W. N. Ashbee, the GER architect, it is dominated by a substantial brick building, surmounted by a cupola. The interior is notable for the fine hammerbeam roof to the ticket hall. Both platforms retain the ornate canopies with the "GER" initials still visible in the bracketry.

The station has toilet facilities, and a waiting room on the Westbound platform.

== Location ==
It is located on the eastern edge of Barkingside (a district of Ilford) in east London at the end of a cul-de-sac off Station Road (which is itself a cul-de-sac).

Day and nighttime London Bus routes 275 and 462, and night route N8 serve the station.

== Services ==
Barkingside station is on the Hainault loop of the Central line between Newbury Park and Fairlop. The typical off-peak service in trains per hour (tph) is:

- 9 tph eastbound to Hainault
- 9 tph to Ealing Broadway

Preceding station	London Underground	Following station
Newbury Park towards Ealing Broadway or West Ruislip	Central line via Hainault Loop	Fairlop towards Hainault or Woodford
