= Felixstowe railway station =

Railway station in Suffolk, England

Felixstowe
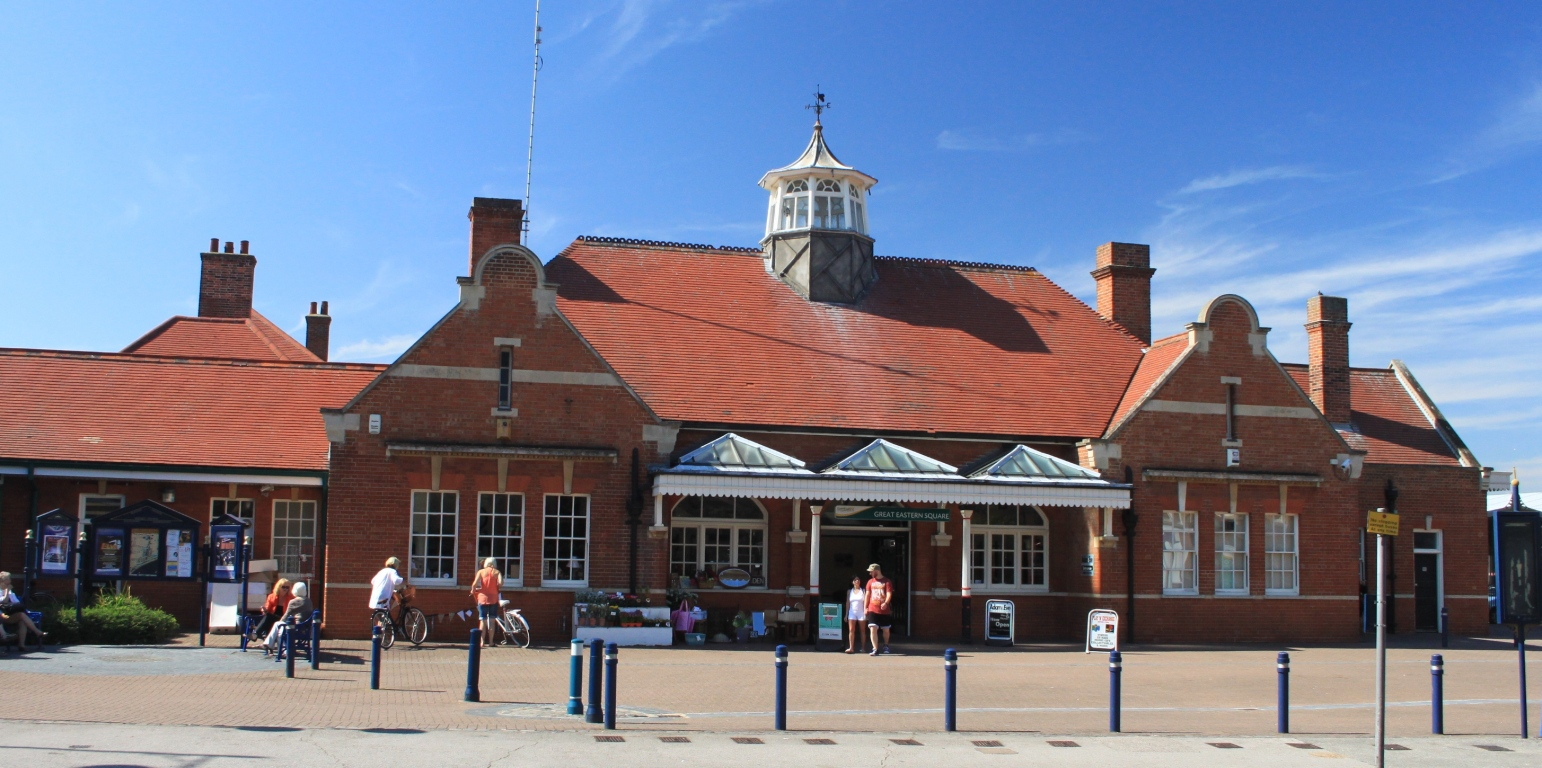
- The original building has been converted into a shopping centre

General information
- Location: Felixstowe, East Suffolk; England
- Coordinates: 51.967°N 1.350°E
- Grid reference: TM302351
- Managed by: Greater Anglia
- Platforms: 1

Other information
- Station code: FLX
- Classification: DfT category F1

History
- Opened: 1898

Passengers
- 2020/21: ▼58,704
- 2021/22: ▲0.193 million
- 2022/23: ▲0.219 million
- 2023/24: ▲0.238 million
- 2024/25: ▲0.279 million
Location
Notes
- Passenger statistics from the Office of Rail and Road

Felixstowe railway station is the eastern passenger terminus of the Felixstowe Branch Line, in the east of England and is the only surviving station serving the coastal town of Felixstowe, Suffolk. It is 15 miles 51 chains (25.2 km) down the line from Ipswich and 84 miles 30 chains (135.8 km) measured from London Liverpool Street; the preceding station on the line is Trimley. Its three-letter station code is FLX.

It was opened by the Great Eastern Railway in 1898 as Felixstowe Town to distinguish it from the other stations at Felixstowe Pier and Felixstowe Beach, both of which have since closed.

The station is owned by Network Rail and is currently managed by Greater Anglia, which also operates all trains serving it.

== History ==
The railway from Westerfield to Felixstowe was opened by the Felixstowe Pier and Railway Company on 1 May 1877. The first railway station was at Felixstowe Pier and a second was soon added at Felixstowe Beach. The railway's principal promoter, Colonel George Tomline, was criticised in the Suffolk Chronicle for building the stations where he "thinks people ought to be, rather than where people actually live". It is also claimed that the Beach station was sited there to be away from the Ordnance Hotel, owned by his rival John Chevalier Cobbold.

On 13 July 1891 Princess Augusta Victoria of Schleswig-Holstein, wife of Kaiser Wilhelm II of Germany and a relative of Queen Victoria, arrived on a train at Felixstowe Beach station. She and five of her children stayed in the town on holiday until 6 August. This gave the town a boost as a holiday resort. Although the population of the town in 1891 was only 3,507 development was increasing along the higher ground north of the Beach station. By now the railway line had been purchased by the GER which set about obtaining powers in the Great Eastern Railway (General Powers) Act 1893 (56 & 57 Vict. c. lii) in June 1893 to divert the railway to Hamilton Road and build a station there. The new Town station was opened on 1 July 1898 by Lord Claud Hamilton, the chairman of the railway company. The direct line from Trimley to Felixstowe Beach was closed and all trains then had to reverse at the Town station before continuing their journey.

A new Orwell Hotel was opened in 1898 opposite the station entrance. More hotels opened in the town around this time, including the luxury Felix Hotel on the sea front in 1903, which was purchased by the GER in 1919 and operated as a railway hotel until it was sold in 1952. A promenade was built along the seafront in 1903 and a pleasure pier opened in 1905. Lord Claud Hamilton was invited back to the town in 1909 to open a new Spa Pavilion. The developing resort was by now served by direct trains from London Liverpool Street station. In 1905 the 10:00 service from London (which had been introduced the previous year as a non-stop service to Lowestoft) called at Westerfield to detach carriages for Felixstowe. It was only allowed two minutes to do this (reduced to a single minute in 1908), and the Felixstowe portion continued on its way just three minutes later. A non-stop train each way between Liverpool Street and Felixstowe Town was introduced in 1906. Another fast train was introduced in 1907 with a single stop at Colchester.

In 1923 the Great Eastern Railway became a part of the new London and North Eastern Railway (LNER). Fewer through trains were run from London than before World War I, but from 1929 until 1939 there was a regular Eastern Belle Pullman service. This train had been operating as the Clacton Pullman but in 1929 was rescheduled to run from London to different LNER resorts in East Anglia each weekday, which resulted in it coming to Felixstowe once a fortnight. It left Liverpool Street at 11:00, took less than two hours to reach Felixstowe, and returned at 19:35. The fare was five shillings.

In 1938 the LNER received new powers to double the Felixstowe Branch Line and enlarge the station. An additional platform was provided at Felixstowe in 1939, but the second track along the branch failed to materialise due to the outbreak of World War II. Bombs fell near the station during the war resulting in some damage to the signal box.

In 1948 the LNER became the Eastern Region of British Railways. Felixstowe Pier station closed on 2 July 1951 and daily services to Felixstowe Beach ceased on 2 November 1959, thereafter running only during summer months. Felixstowe Beach closed in 1967.

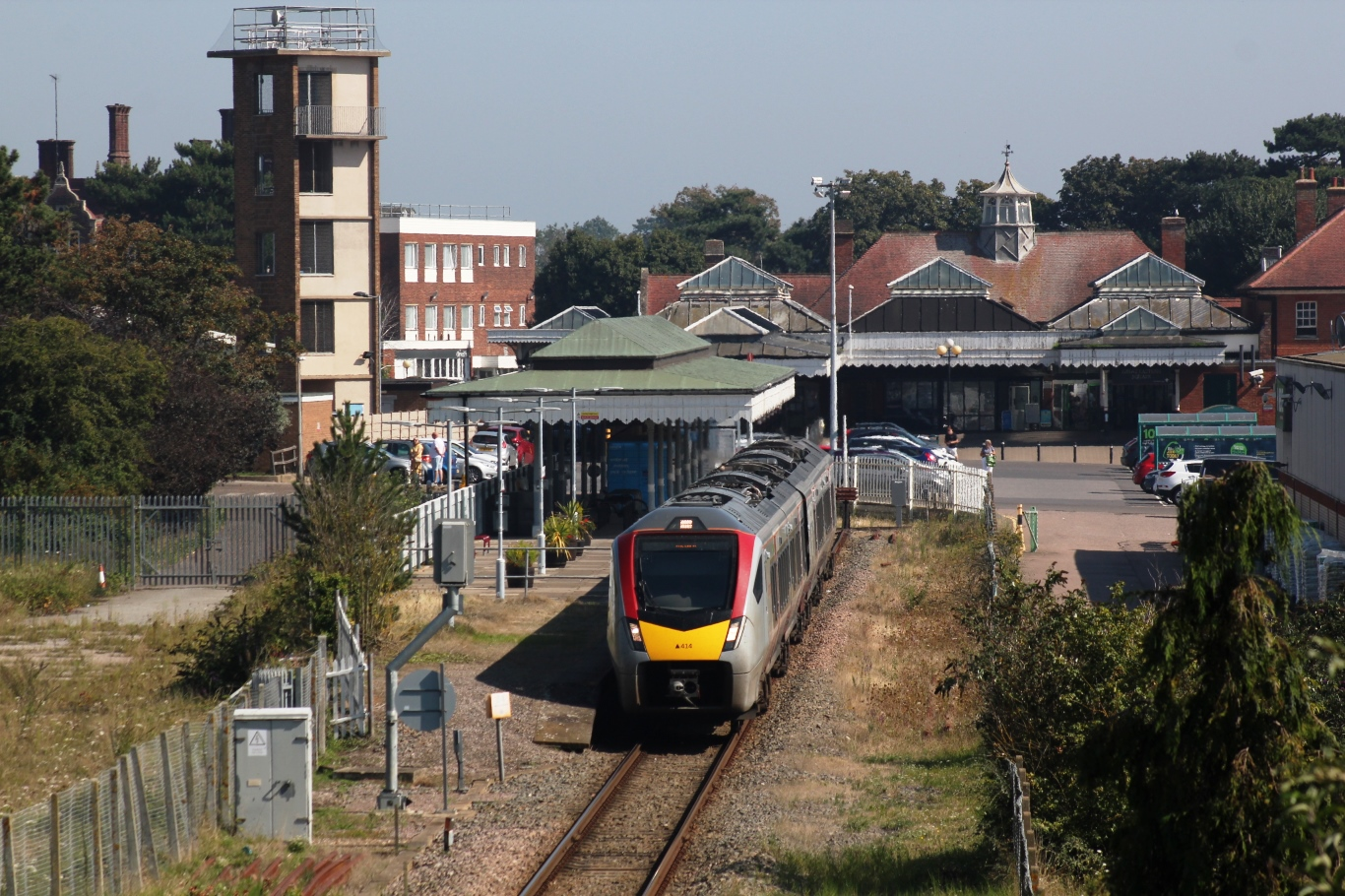
A Class 755 train for Ipswich leaves the one remaining and shortened platform, with the old station buildings in the right background.

An accelerated passenger service using diesel multiple units was introduced on 15 June 1959. The time from Ipswich to Felixstowe Town was reduced from 35 to 24 minutes which allowed a train to work there and back within an hour. Three Pullman camping coaches were positioned here by the Eastern Region from 1960 to 1965. Freight traffic ended on 5 December 1966. A few months later the branch was converted to "Pay Train" operation, which meant that all fares were collected by the guard, so staff were no longer needed at the station other than a signalman.

In 1967 a new container terminal opened at Felixstowe docks, after which freight traffic quickly grew. Because the direct line to the pier and docks had been closed in 1898 when the Town station opened, all trains to the docks had to enter the station and reverse there to continue their journey. To eliminate this a new direct line was opened to the docks on 13 May 1970 using the same alignment as from 1877 to 1898. At the same time the station was reduced to just a single platform and the direct line from there towards the docks was closed. This allowed the signal box to be closed, the trains now being controlled by the signalman at Trimley until 1999 when this too was closed and control transferred to Colchester.

The station buildings were listed Grade II on 23 December 1980. They were converted into the Great Eastern Square shopping centre, which opened on 14 March 1985.

=== Accidents ===
On 1 September 1900 there was a collision at the station. An "up" passenger train from Felixstowe to Ipswich left the station despite the signal not being set to permit this move. There was a freight train arriving at the time and the two trains collided at relatively low speed, resulting in twelve injuries. The investigation was undertaken by Lt Colonel P G Donop for the Board of Trade. After interviewing all the staff involved (train crew, signalman and station master) concluded that the fault lay with the driver (which he readily admitted) who had passed the signal at danger. The locomotives involved were GER 474 (a GER Class T19) on the goods train and 791 (a GER Class M15) on the passenger train.

On 19 July 1933 a signalling error caused a locomotive to run back into a rake of carriages after it had uncoupled from them. Thirteen people were injured.

== Description ==
The station building of 1898 was designed by J. Wilson and the GER's architect W.N. Ashbee in the domestic revival style using red brick with stone dressings and a pantile roof. It was described by the local newspaper as having been built "in a style which harmonises with its aristocratic surroundings". It contained a booking office, refreshment and waiting rooms, and incorporated living accommodation for the Station Master. The building was topped off by an octagonal roof lantern which became known locally as "the lighthouse". Between the wings of the building was a 92x84 foot (28.0x25.6 metre) covered circulating area. A carriage road came to the north side of the station from High Road West. The buildings were listed Grade II on 23 December 1980.

In 1898 a single platform had tracks on both sides, one being 785 feet (239 m) and the other 650 feet (200 m). A glazed roof supported by columns ran along the eastern 500 feet (150 m). An additional pair of platforms were added in 1939, however the Board of Trade Inspector did not visit and approve their use until October 1948 due to the war. The station had a goods yard on the south side of the line, opposite the passenger platforms. The 76-lever signal box was on the north side of the line on the east side of the bridge which carries Garrison Lane over the railway. A turntable was situated behind the signal box.

Trains now only use the western end of the one remaining platform (the one built in 1898), although the canopy has been retained here. It is long enough to accommodate a six-coach train.

== Services ==
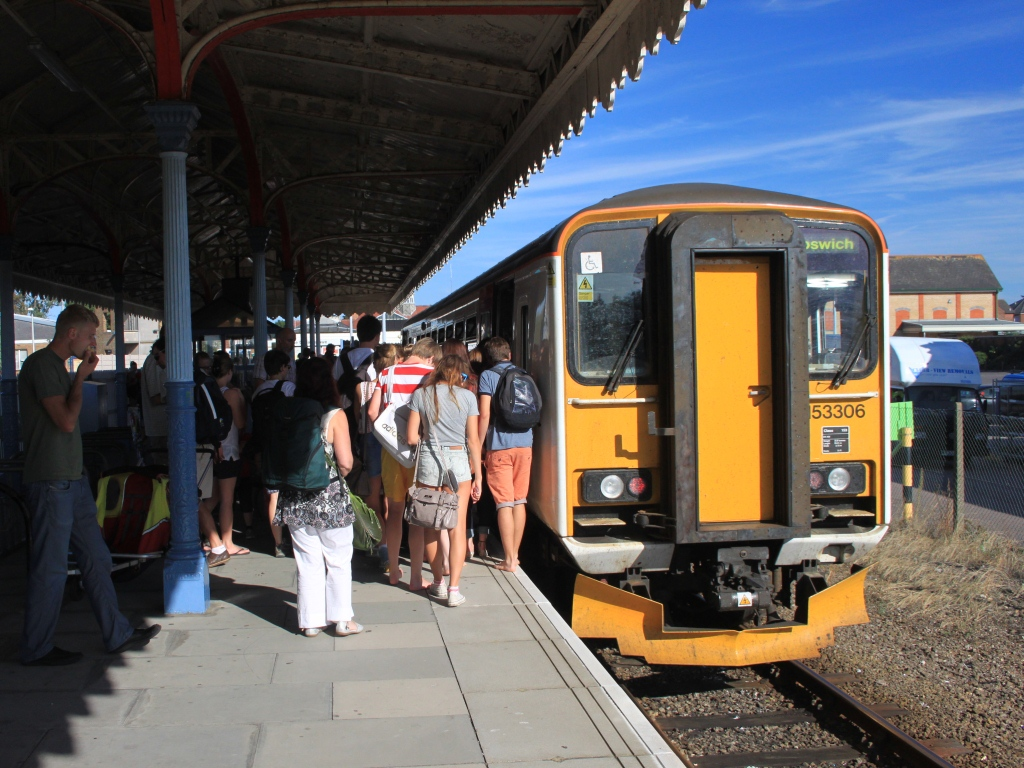
Passengers boarding a train for Ipswich

Trains are operated by Greater Anglia and run throughout the day between Ipswich and Felixstowe, calling at all stations. They run every hour for most of the day, but they start later on Sundays.

| Preceding station | National Rail | Following station |
|---|---|---|
| Trimley | Greater Anglia Felixstowe Branch Line | Terminus |
| | Historical railways | |
| Trimley | Great Eastern Railway Felixstowe Branch Line | Felixstowe Beach |

== Gallery ==
Features of Felixstowe railway station

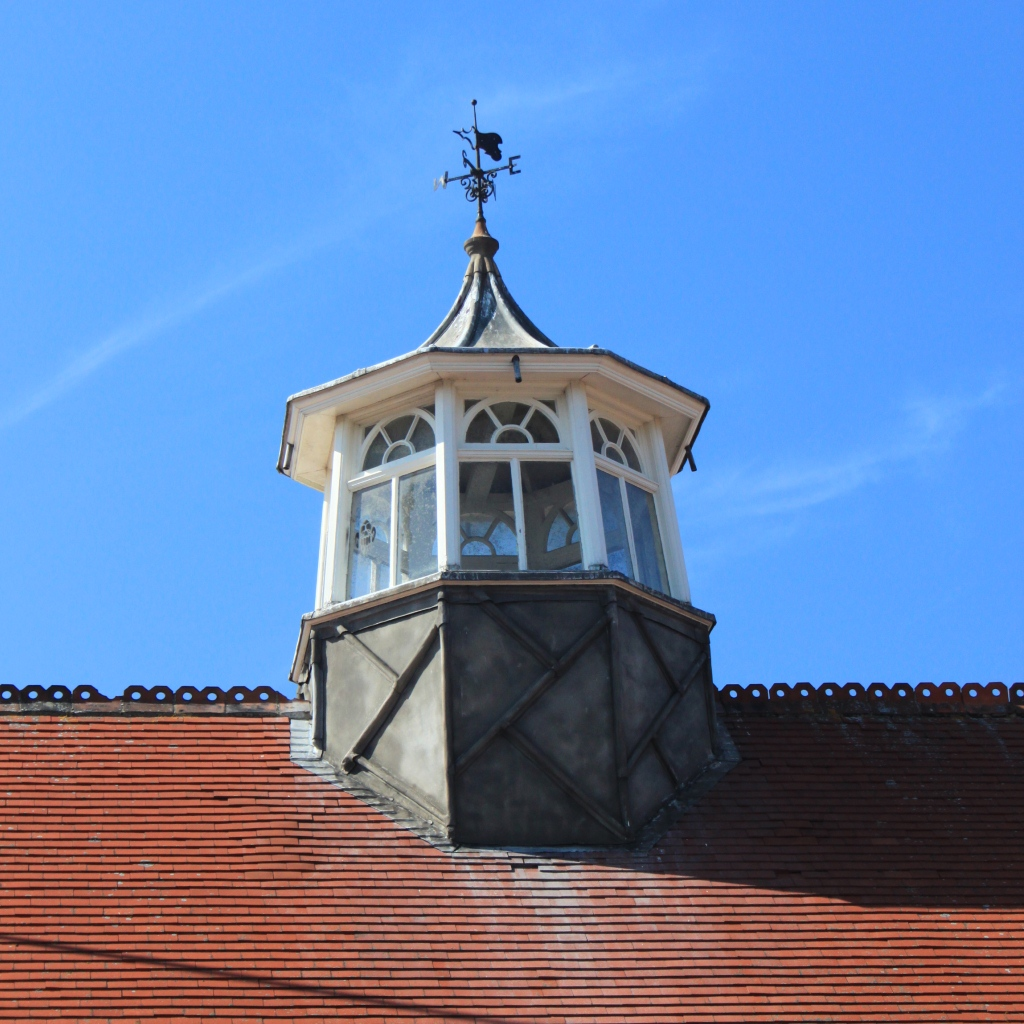
The roof lantern

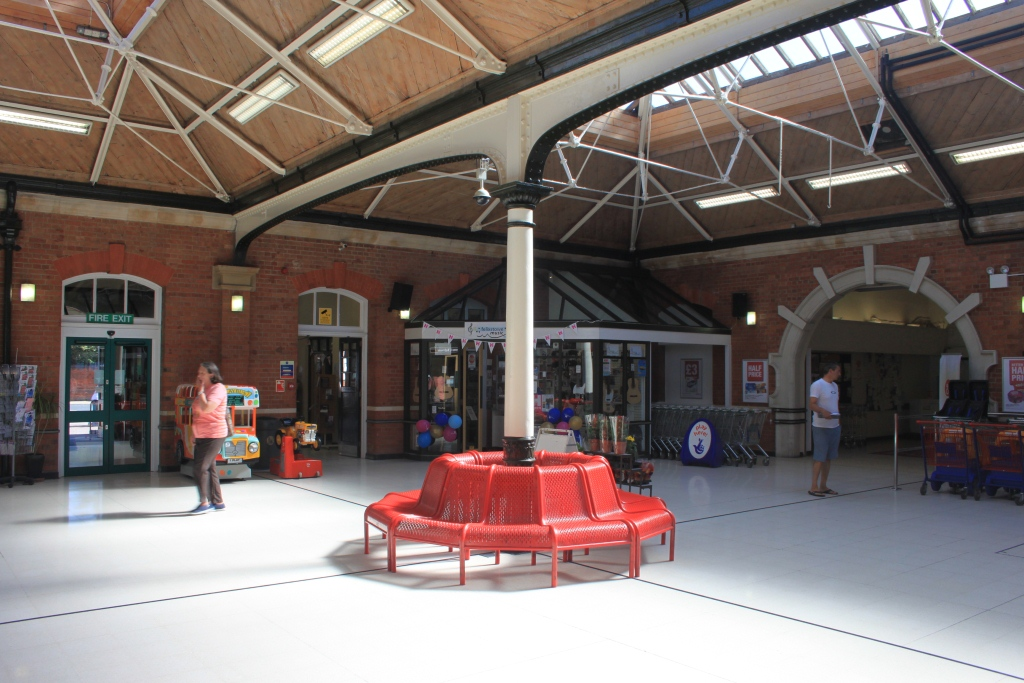
Inside the circulating area

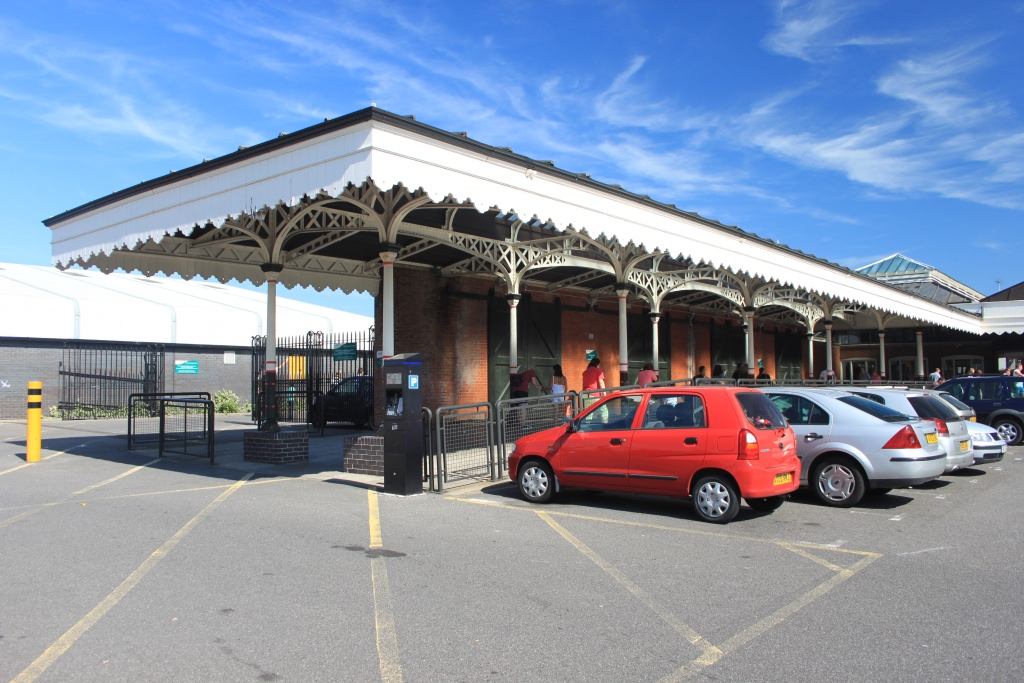
Platform converted to a car park

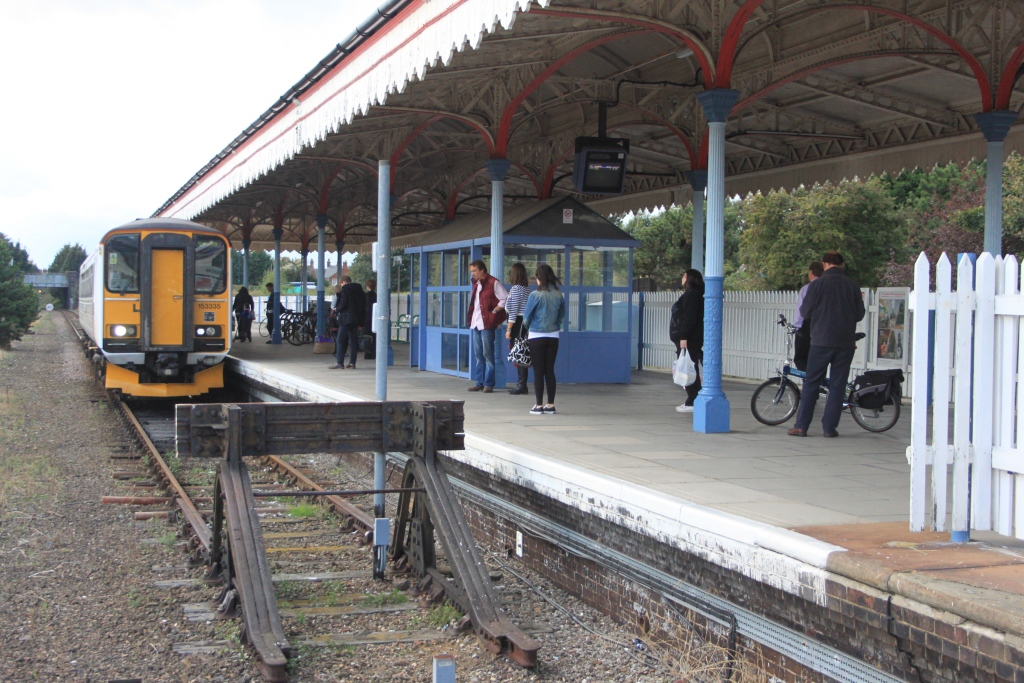
The remaining shortened platform
