= Felixstowe Pier railway station =

Former railway station in England

Felixstowe Pier

General information
- Location: Felixstowe, East Suffolk; England
- Coordinates: 51.94859°N 1.31739°E
- Grid reference: TM280329
- Platforms: 1

Other information
- Status: Disused

History
- Original company: Felixstowe Railway and Pier Company
- Pre-grouping: Great Eastern Railway
- Post-grouping: London and North Eastern Railway

Key dates
- 1 May 1877: opened
- 2 July 1951: closed (passenger)
Location

Felixstowe Pier was a railway station on the Felixstowe branch line built in 1877 the site of which is now within the boundary of the Port of Felixstowe. There were a number of sidings that served the docks that were situated to the north of the line as well as one that served the seaplane (and subsequent military) bases on the south side. The station consisted of a single platform and run round loop. The siding at the "river" end of the run round loop extended onto a jetty.

This is not the later Felixstowe pleasure pier built in 1905 on the sea front.

== History ==
The construction of the pier was authorised by the Felixstowe Pier Order 1873.

The station was opened in 1877 and was served by the original train service from Westerfield Junction that also called at Derby Road, Orwell and Felixstowe Beach railway station. It was built by Colonel Tomline and the station provided direct access to passengers arriving by ferry. Two years later, the Felixstowe Railway and Dock Act 1879 (42 & 43 Vict. c. clxxvii) authorising the construction of Felixstowe Dock (now the Port of Felixstowe) passed through Parliament. The first with the intention of operating steam vessels between Felixstowe and certain ports on the Elbe in competition with the Great Eastern Railway that operated services from what is now Harwich International Port. To this day a foot ferry operates from a location a few hundred metres away to Harwich.

The Great Eastern Railway took over operation of the Felixstowe branch line in 1879 (purchasing it outright in 1887) and in 1898 they opened a new station at Felixstowe Town, cutting off the direct route from Westerfield (although by this time most trains started from Ipswich). This saw a decline in traffic to the station and by the mid-1920s the services that worked beyond Felixstowe Town terminated at Felixstowe Beach. The London and North Eastern Railway took over operation of the line in 1923 but traffic was so light the station was unstaffed and the train service (be it freight or passenger) operated on a one engine in steam principle.

Although traffic picked up in World War II (the estuary was a base for a considerable number of ships as well as coastal defence fortifications) the immediate period after the war saw the station once again become a backwater. British Railways took over operation in 1948 and closure to passengers followed in 1951. Rather improbably (given it is not the most picturesque area of Felixstowe) a pair of camping coaches were located at the pier station from 1952 until 1954, then four coaches were here until 1959 after which they were located at Felixstowe Town. These were removed inland to Westerfield railway station for storage in the winter months. In the 1960s the container revolution saw a dramatic upturn in the dock's fortunes and freight trains started running regularly to the dock area with the station area was still extant in the 1970s. The extension of the port in the 1980s has seen all remaining traces of the station and pier obliterated.

For historical details of the service please see the timetable section of the Felixstowe branch line entry.

Locomotives that worked the line can be found in the Felixstowe railway station section.

== Route ==
Preceding station	Disused railways	Following station
Felixstowe Beach	Felixstowe Railway and Pier Company; Felixstowe Branch Line	Terminus
