= Felixstowe Pier =

Pleasure pier in Felixtowe, UK

Coordinates: 51.9575°N 1.34689°E

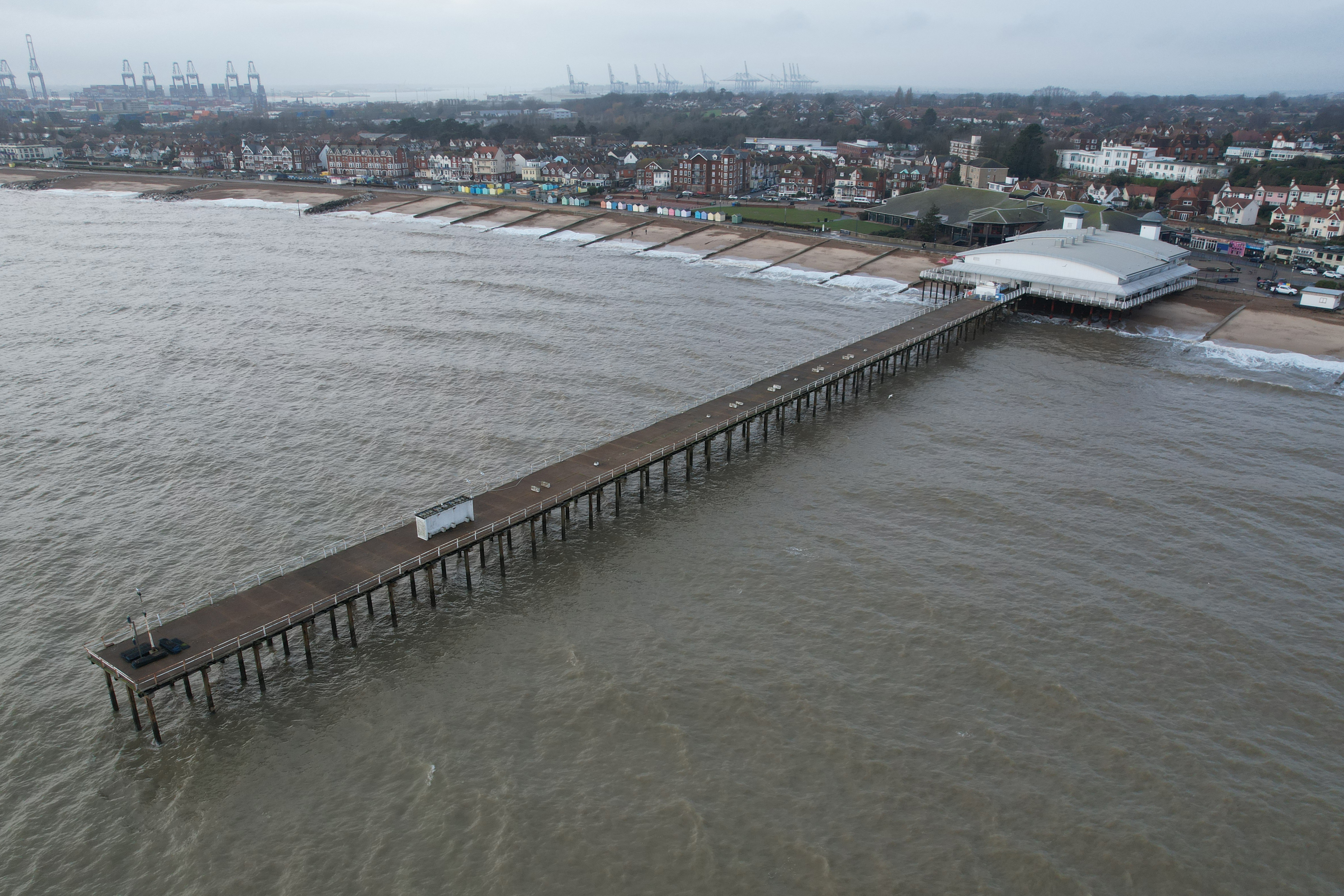
- Felixstowe Pier in 2026
- Type: Pleasure Pier
- Official name: Felixstowe Pier
- Owner: Stan Threadwell (Pier Amusements Felixstowe Limited)

Characteristics
- Total length: 450 feet (140 m)

History
- Designer: Rogers Brothers
- Opening date: 1905

Felixstowe Pier is a pleasure pier in the Edwardian seaside town of Felixstowe, Suffolk, England. It opened in August 1905 and measures 2,640 feet (800 metres) in length, once ranking among the longest in the country. Steamer services ran from the pier to various destinations. Despite not having its own railway station, the pier was a significant transport hub, although confusion arose due to another now-demolished pier in Felixstowe.

Felixstowe pleasure pier should not be confused with an older wooden pier also called Felixstowe pier but located near Landguard Common next to the old Felixstowe port. It was the original terminus of the Felixstowe branch line and gave rise to the name of the Felixstowe Pier railway station, the site of which is now within the modern Felixstowe container port reclaimed land. The Harwich - Felixstowe ferry also used this pier originally.

During the war, the pier was sectioned to reduce the risk of enemy invasion, which it never fully recovered from, resulting in the pierhead being demolished after the war, having been left to deteriorate.

In 2017, a new shore-end structure was opened to the public at a cost of £3m, offering family entertainments as part of a wider regeneration scheme for the local area.

== History ==
Having been authorised by the Felixstowe Pier Order 1900 and promoted in 1903, the pier opened in August 1905 at a length of 2,640 feet (800 m), making it at the time one of the longest in the country; the pier was the last of a trio built for the Coast Development Company Limited, which had been formed by a merger between Belle Steamers Limited and other local companies in 1898. The pier was constructed using timber, rather than iron, which was unusual for this period, though foreign timbers such as jarrah and greenheart had been increasing in popularity due to their resistance against worms and being more cost effective. A 3ft 6in gauge electric tram service operated to and from the pier head. Paddle steamer boat services took visitors to and from other resorts for 1 penny, including London Bridge and Great Yarmouth at a time when steamers faced competition from railway services.

The Coast Development Company went into liquidation, and on 14 July 1906 the pier was conveyed to the Coast Development Corporation Limited.

The Coast Development Corporation itself went into liquidation 10 years later in 1915. On 19 May 1922 the pier was acquired from the liquidators by East Coast Piers Limited, who continued operation of the tram system during the summer season.

Felixstowe Pier Act 1947
- Act of Parliament
- Parliament of the United Kingdom
- Long title: An Act to validate past sales of the Felixstowe Pier undertaking to authorise future sales thereof to make further provision for the finance of the said undertaking to provide for the revision of the authorised rates and for other purposes.
- Citation: 10 & 11 Geo. 6. c. xvi

Dates
- Royal assent: 18 July 1947

Text of statute as originally enacted

On 19 March 1926 the pier was once more transferred, to Coast Properties Limited. However, the Felixstowe Pier Order 1900 did not permit the pier to be sold, and the Felixstowe Pier Act 1947 (10 & 11 Geo. 6. c. xvi) had to be passed to regularise the previous transfers.

The pier was sectioned during World War II by the Royal Engineers for defence purposes to prevent enemy invasion, which included the indefinite suspension of the tram system which never resumed after the war. Its seaward end was neglected during the war and was ultimately demolished once the war was over, with further reductions in its length occurring during the 1950s.

=== Renovation plans ===
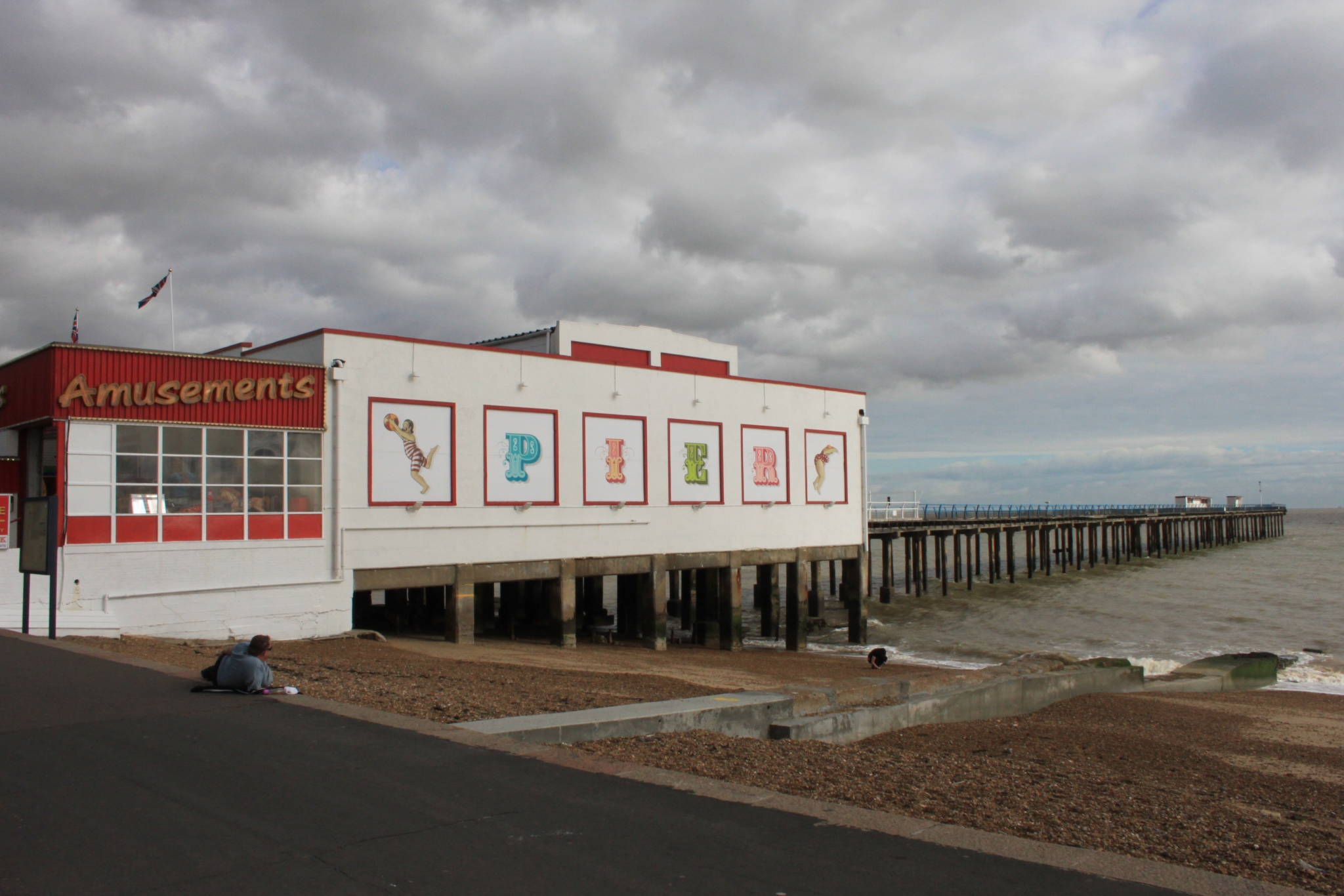
Former shoreside pier building in 2012

Various repair and renovation plans were proposed over the years, including in 1996 for a repair project that was estimated to cost around £2.5 million. Separately in 1999, a charitable trust was established to aid refurbishment, aiming to raise £15 m but no progress was made due to lack of listed status and the project was abandoned in 2002. The owners submitted a demolition request in 2004.

== Modern pier ==
A project to rebuild the pier's main building was approved by councillors in 2012, with anticipation that work in demolishing the old pier building could occur several months later. The rebuild was delayed primarily due to costs in achieving good value for money, as well as negotiations regarding additional land required for the new structure that wasn't owned by the pier owners. The council received nine letters of objection to the project, including complaints that the new structure's size may obscure the view of the sea; in contrast, seven letters were received in support, including people saying it would be a boost to tourism and help wider regeneration of the local area.

In August 2017, a new £3 million pier and building opened to visitors with the official opening in October 2017, as part of a wider regeneration scheme for the area. The new structure includes a bowling alley, arcade machines and wraparound boardwork. The pier decking extending over the sea remained; however due to safety concerns, visitors are not able to walk the entire length which has been inaccessible since around 1999 due to corrosion and rotten timber beams supporting the pier deck. The original plan involved demolishing this section of pier until an alternate proposal to retain it was put forward.
