= Edward Wilson (engineer) =

Edward Wilson (1820 in Edinburgh, Scotland – 1877) was a civil and locomotive engineer, notable for his work on the development of railways in the nineteenth century.

== Career ==
After working initially for his father Wilson was articled to Stark & Fulton, Engineers, of Glasgow.

Wilson worked on the Caledonian Canal and various railways, including acting as the locomotive superintendent for the Hull and Selby Railway. From 1847 to 1853, he was engineer to the York and North Midland Railway, before assuming this position on the Midland Great Western Railway, Ireland in 1853. From 1858 he was Locomotive and Permanent Way Engineer for the Oxford, Worcester and Wolverhampton Railway (later the West Midland Railway).

In 1864 Wilson set up his own practice, Edward Wilson & Co, and worked on the Metropolitan Railway and on several new lines on the Great Western Railway and on many Great Eastern Railway projects, including the first phase of Liverpool Street Station in 1874. He was joined in the practice by his nephew, John Wilson (1846–1922), who was his apprentice, and by the architect W. N. Ashbee; collectively the three contributed to the Great Eastern works.

After Wilson's death in 1877 the practice of Edward Wilson & Co was carried on by John Wilson, in partnership with J. S. Macintyre, until it was dissolved in 1883 when John Wilson and Ashbee joined the permanent staff of the GER.

== Sources ==
- MacDermot, E T (1927). History of the Great Western Railway, volume I 1833-1863. London: Great Western Railway.
- Reed, P. J. T. (December 1956). White, D. E. (ed.). The Locomotives of the Great Western Railway, part three: Absorbed Engines, 1854-1921. RCTS. ISBN 0-901115-33-9. OCLC 12654357.
- Shepherd, W. Ernest (1994). The Midland Great Western Railway of Ireland: An Illustrated History. Leicester: Midland Publishing. ISBN 1-85780-008-7.
- Baxter, Bertram (1986). Baxter, David (ed.). Volume 5A: North Eastern Railway; Hull and Barnsley Railway. British Locomotive Catalogue 1825-1923. Ashbourne: Moorland Publishing. ISBN 0-903485-54-0.
- UK Census returns
