= W. N. Ashbee =

English railway architect

William Neville Ashbee (1852 – 30 April 1919) was an English railway architect notable for stations on the Great Eastern Railway, including the London terminus at Liverpool Street Station.

== Career ==
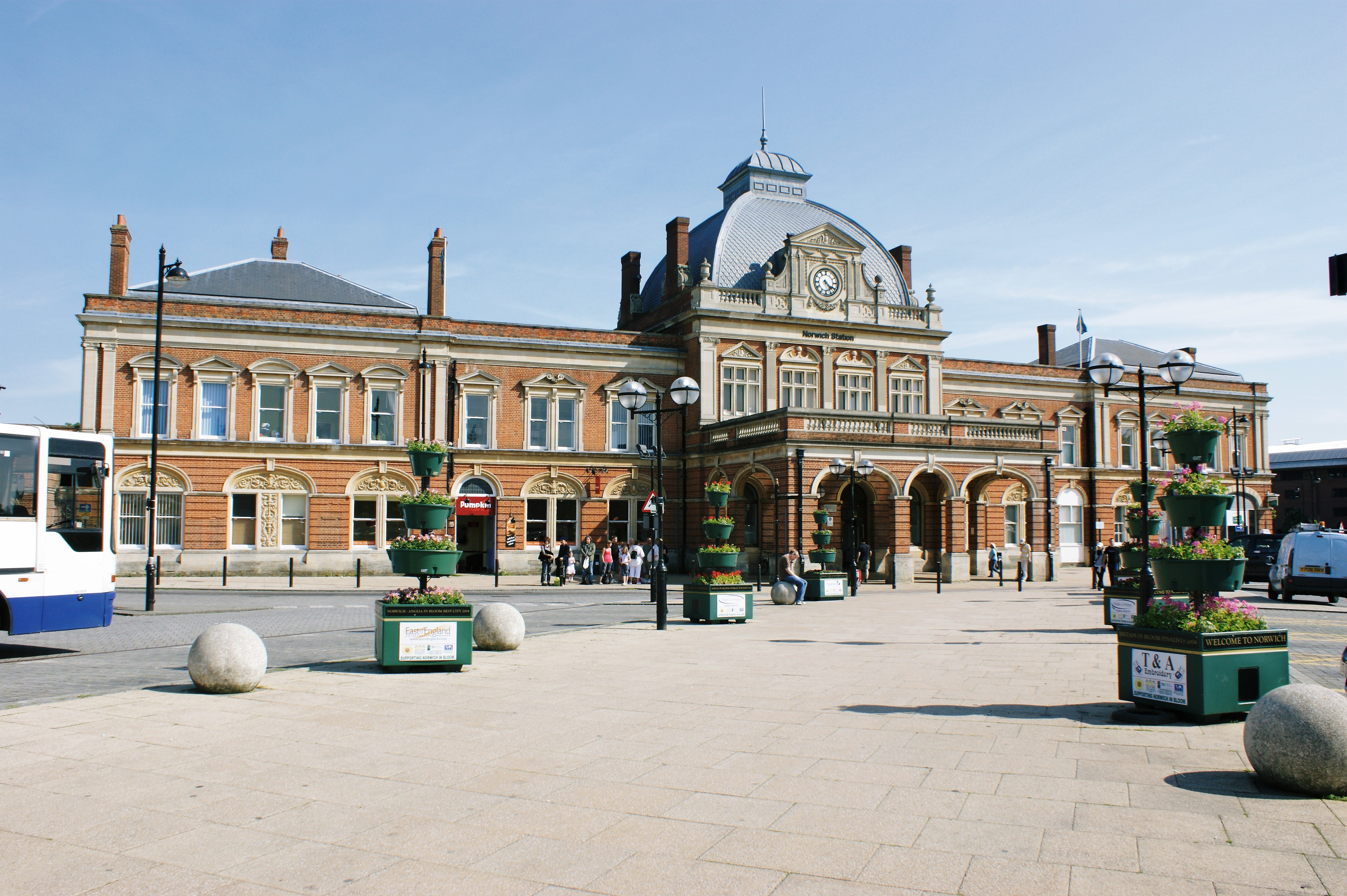
Norwich Station

The son of John Ashbee, who was the first stationmaster of the Great Western station at Gloucester, Ashbee was articled as an architect to Alfred Maberley, the Diocesan Surveyor for Gloucester (the place of his birth) and became his assistant in 1872. In 1874 he joined the engineering firm of Edward Wilson & Co working on the construction of Liverpool Street Station and, while with the firm, designed most of the new Great Eastern Railway stations built in that period, working with John Wilson as engineer. In 1882 he was promoted to Head of the Architects' Department. In 1883 Wilson resigned from the firm to join the GER as chief engineer and Ashbee followed him. as the head of the architectural department of the GER from 1883, a position he held until 1916. His major early work after appointment was the elaborate Norwich Thorpe station, built in 1884–6 in a "Free Renaissance" style. He later worked with John Wilson as the architect for the 1894 expansion of Liverpool Street Station, built in neo Tudor style. When Liverpool Street was rebuilt in the 1980s, the quality of the original brickwork and detailing, said to be of a higher standard than characterised by Wilson's work, was praised.

Following his appointment to the GER in 1883 Ashbee started to adopt the "Domestic Revival" style of architecture which had been used by the London, Brighton and South Coast Railway on its new lines in Sussex in the early 1880s. His earliest work in this style was the Up Side at Ingatestone railway station in 1884/5, followed by Wivenhoe and Frinton stations in 1886 and 1888.

Ashbee was the creator of the New Essex style, later known as the Ashbee style; this was named after the 15 stations which Ashbee designed for the Shenfield to Southend Line and the Crouch Valley Line, the so-called "New Essex" lines, which were opened in 1888/9. These reflected a standardisation of his Domestic Revival style across several common plans, characterized by red brick, tiled gables and elaborate timber canopies. Trimley railway station was one of only two stations outside Essex to be built in this style. The brick and gables often featured also on the cottages built close to stations for their staff.

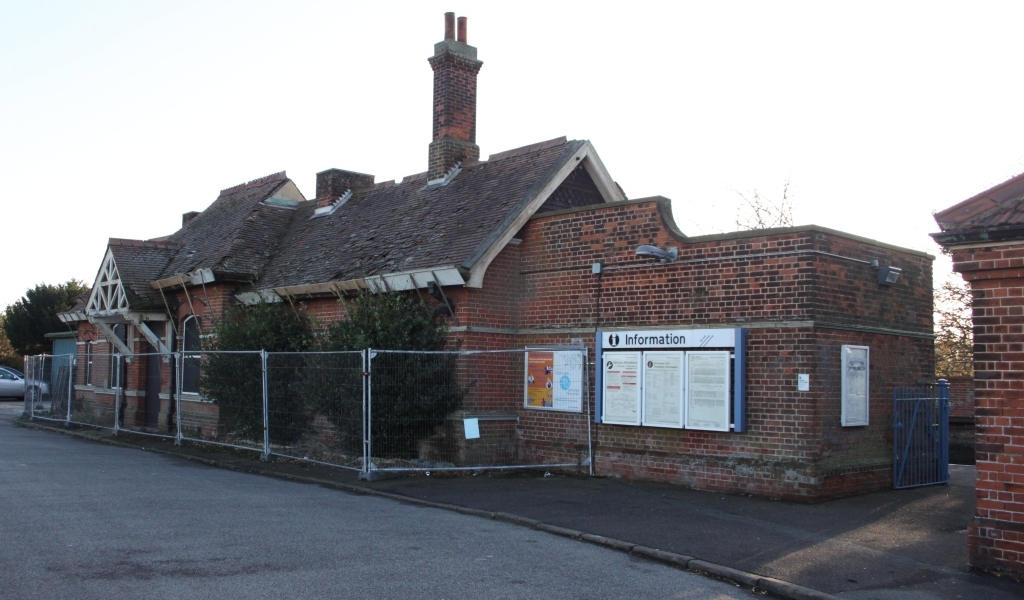
Trimley Station

His smaller stations of the 1890s were however plainer in style, although red brick remained a feature, while other stations of this decade, such as Chappel and Buckhurst Hill, were quite different. He returned however to the more elaborate style closely related to the New Essex style for his work in the early 1900s on the Yarmouth–Lowestoft Line and Fairlop Loop.

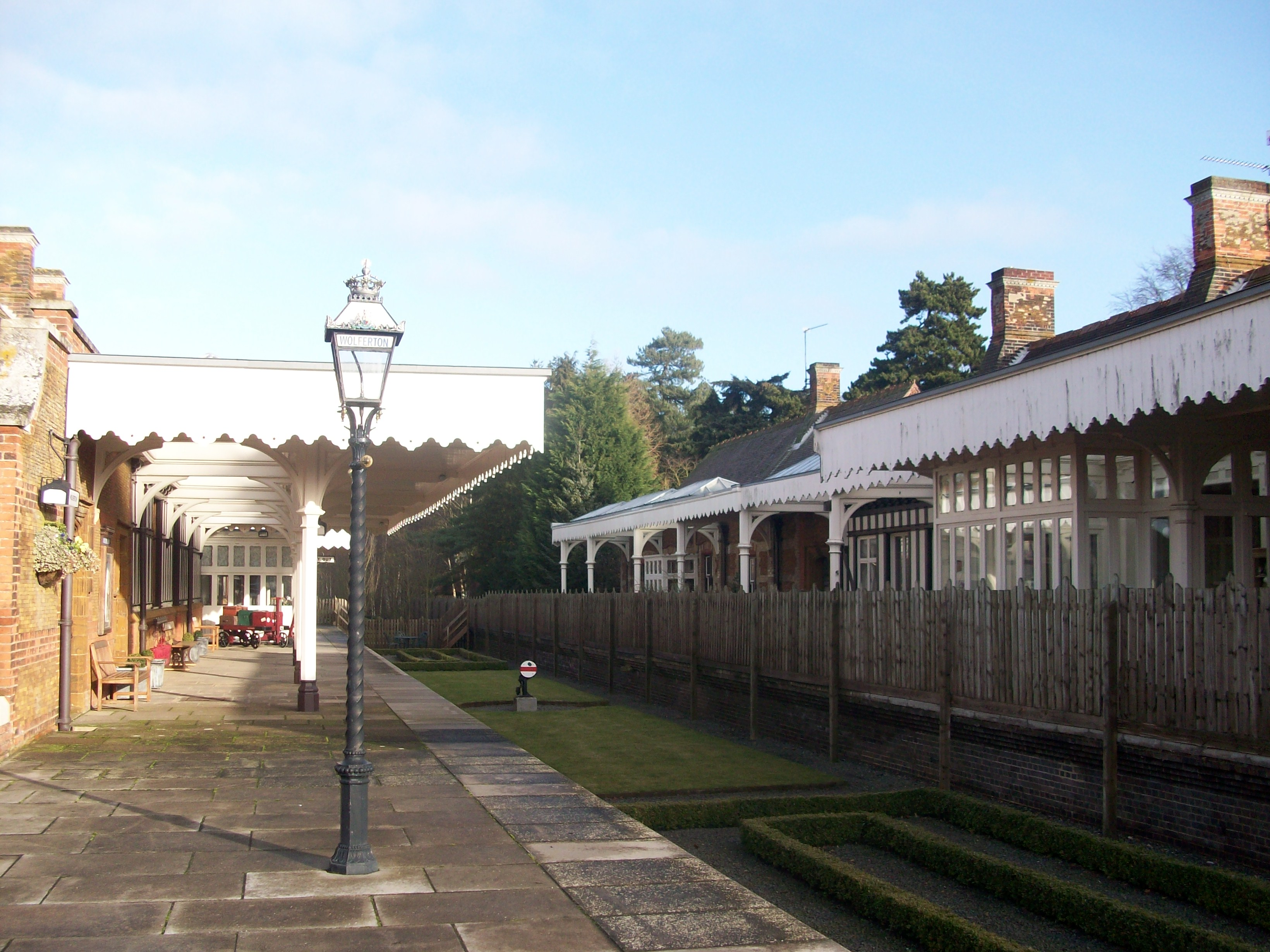
Wolferton Station

Wolferton station was built to serve the Royal Family’s Sandringham estate and included a suite of Tudor-style royal reception and retiring rooms as well as a spacious carriage dock and a small gasworks, which lit the entire station.

He became an associate in 1881 and a fellow in 1890 of the Royal Institute of British Architects.

== Stations by Ashbee ==
=== Notable stations ===
Ashbee was responsible for many stations on the Great Eastern Railway, some of which are now listed buildings. His more notable works include:

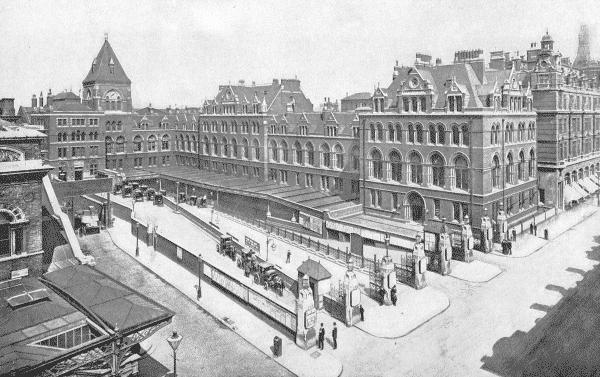
* Liverpool Street (1896)

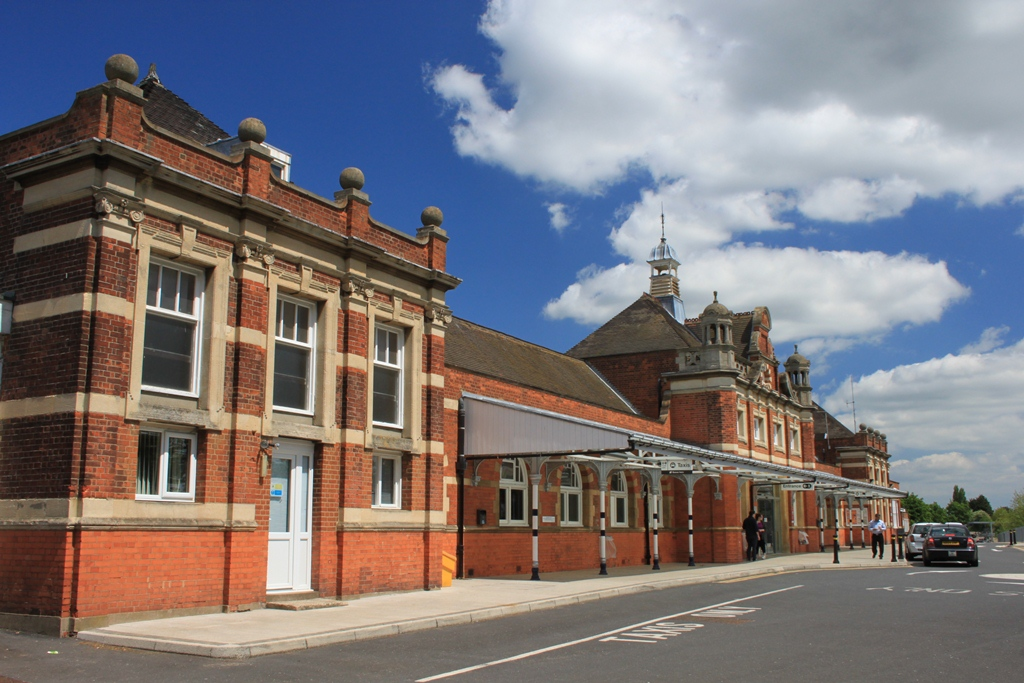
* Colchester

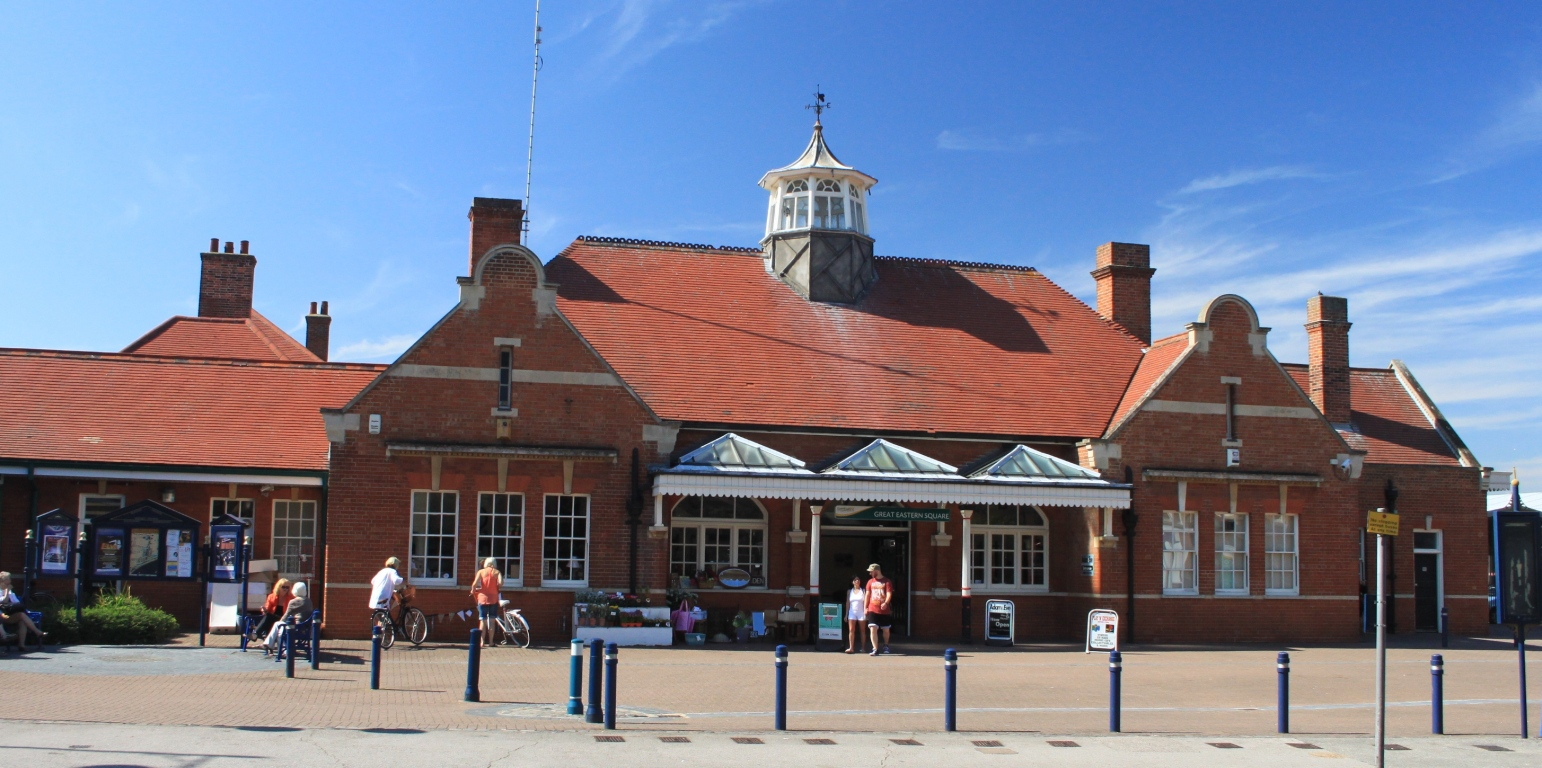
* Felixstowe

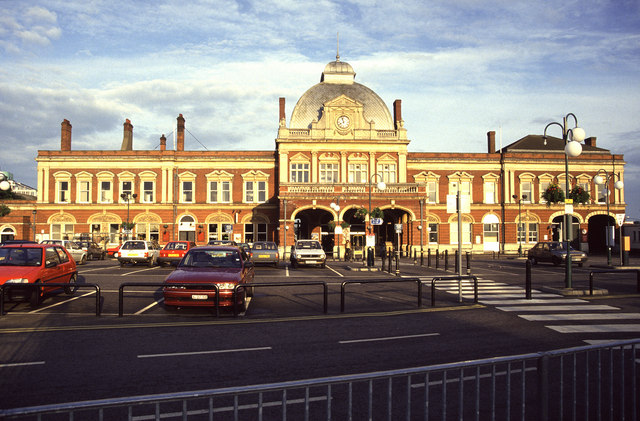
* Norwich (1993)

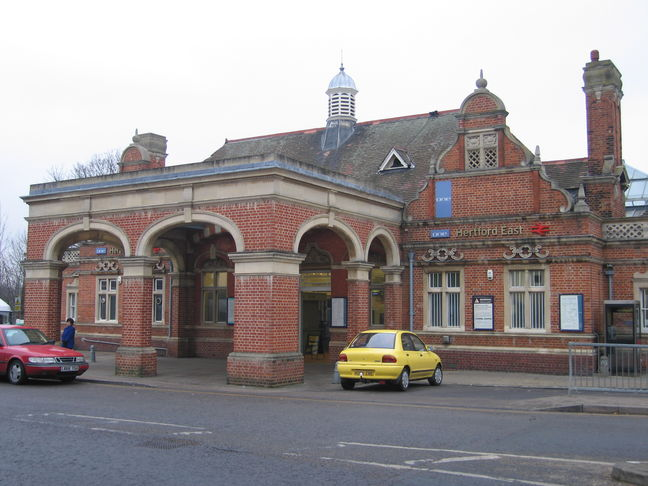
* Hertford East

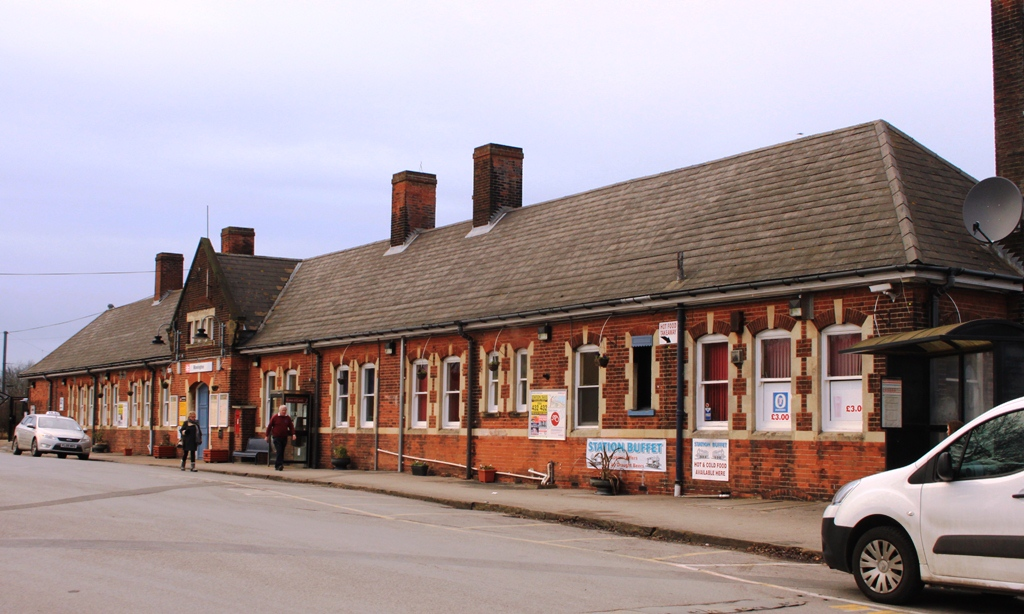
* Manningtree

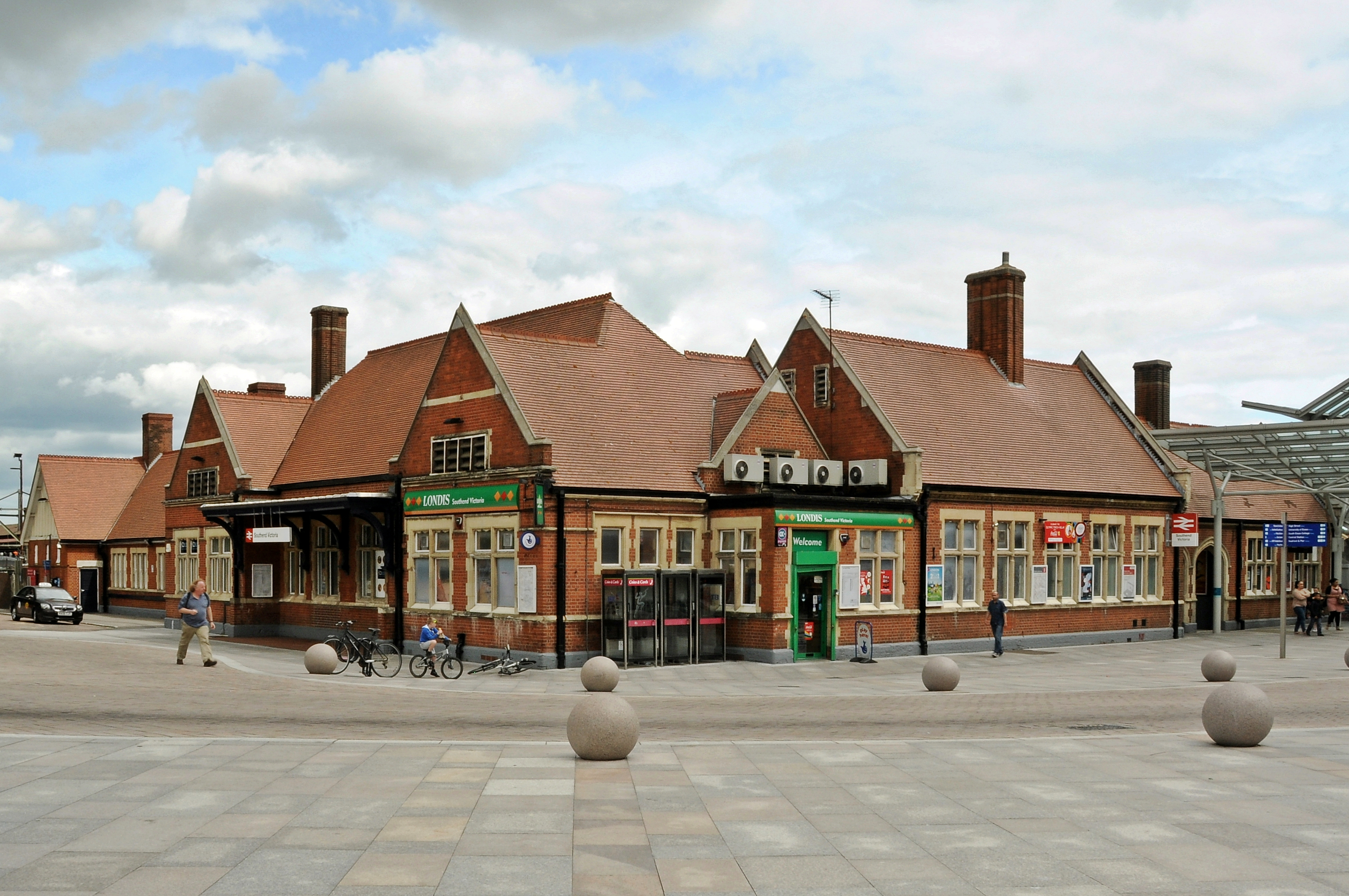
* Southend Victoria

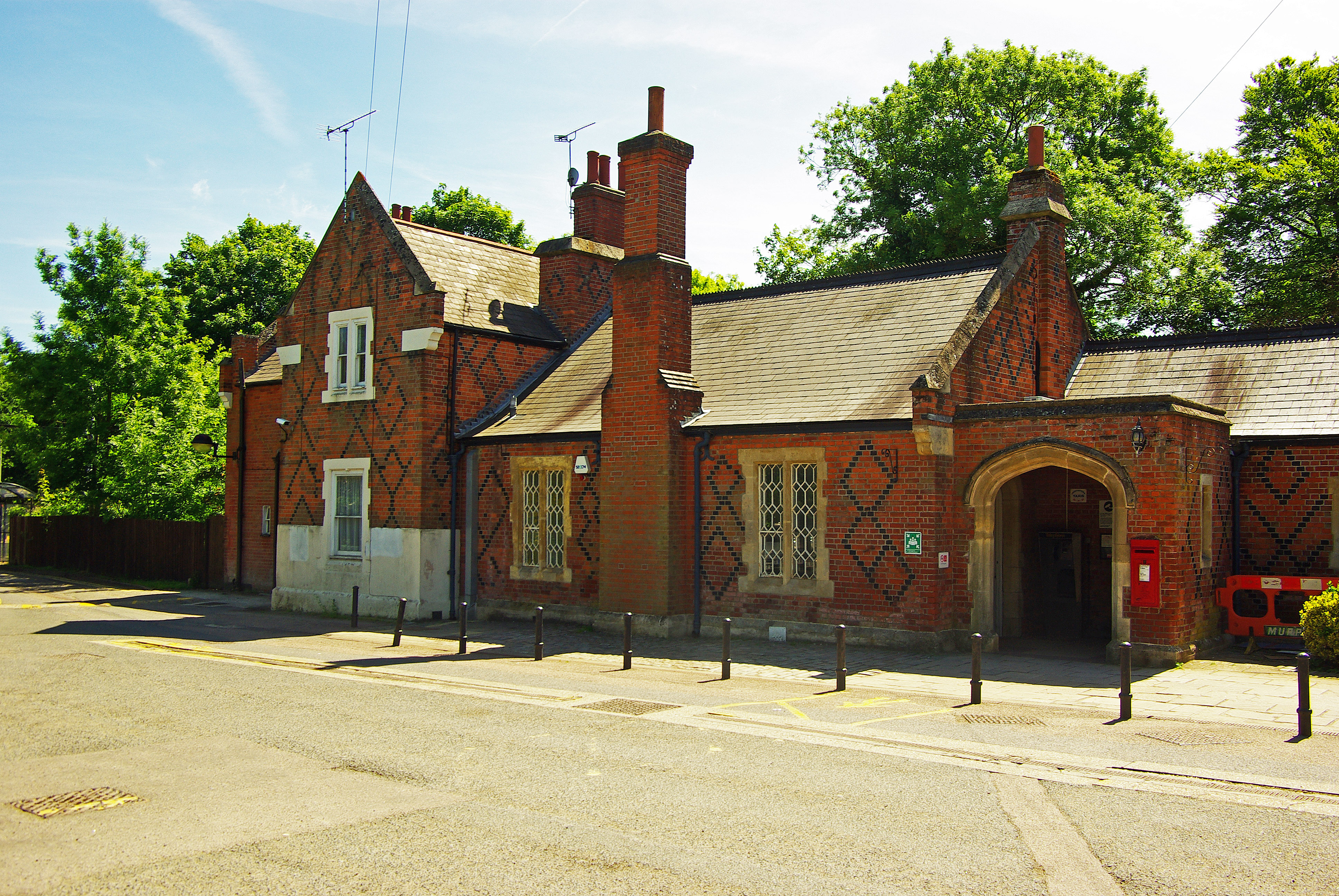
* Ingatestone

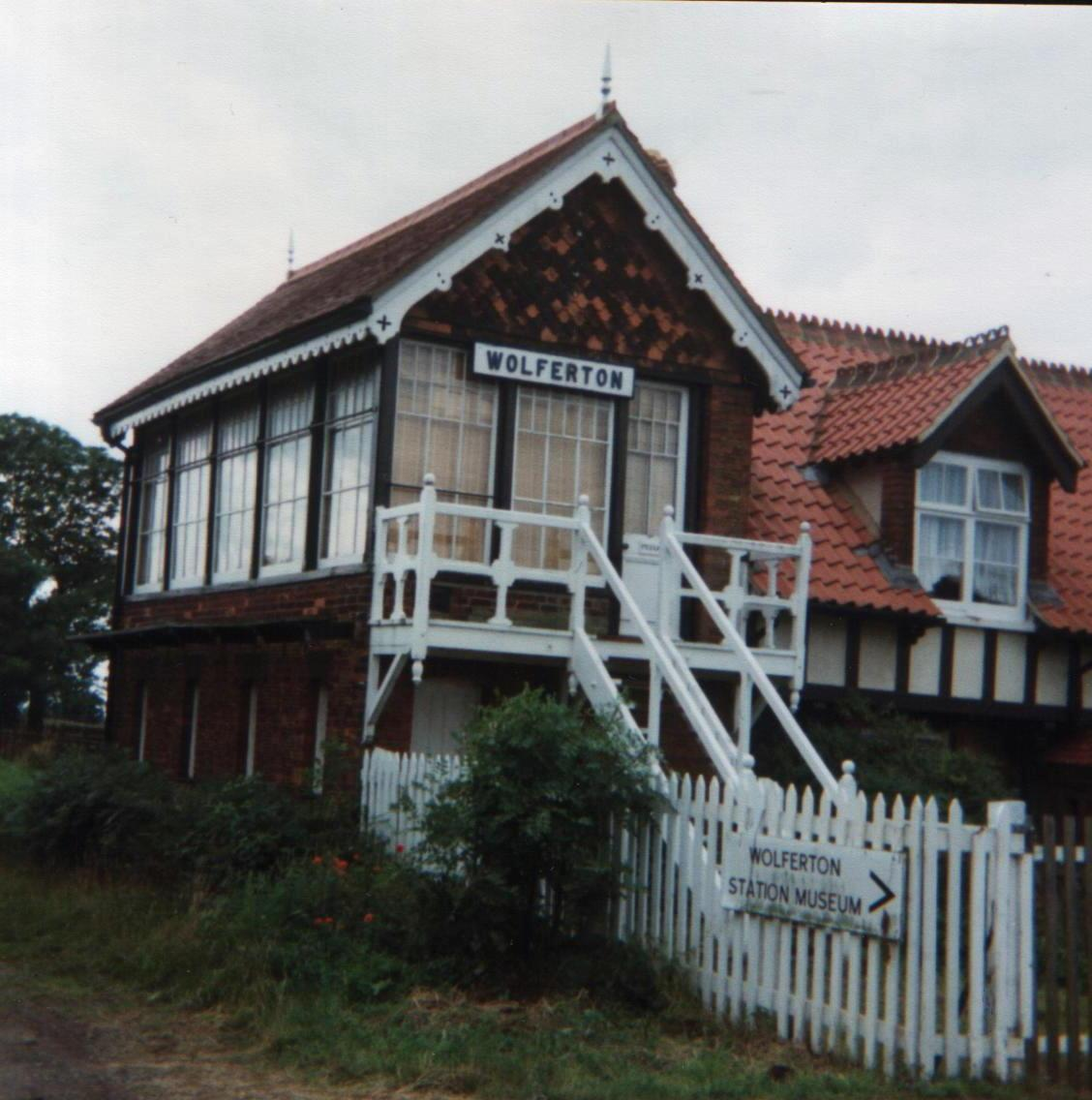
* Wolferton

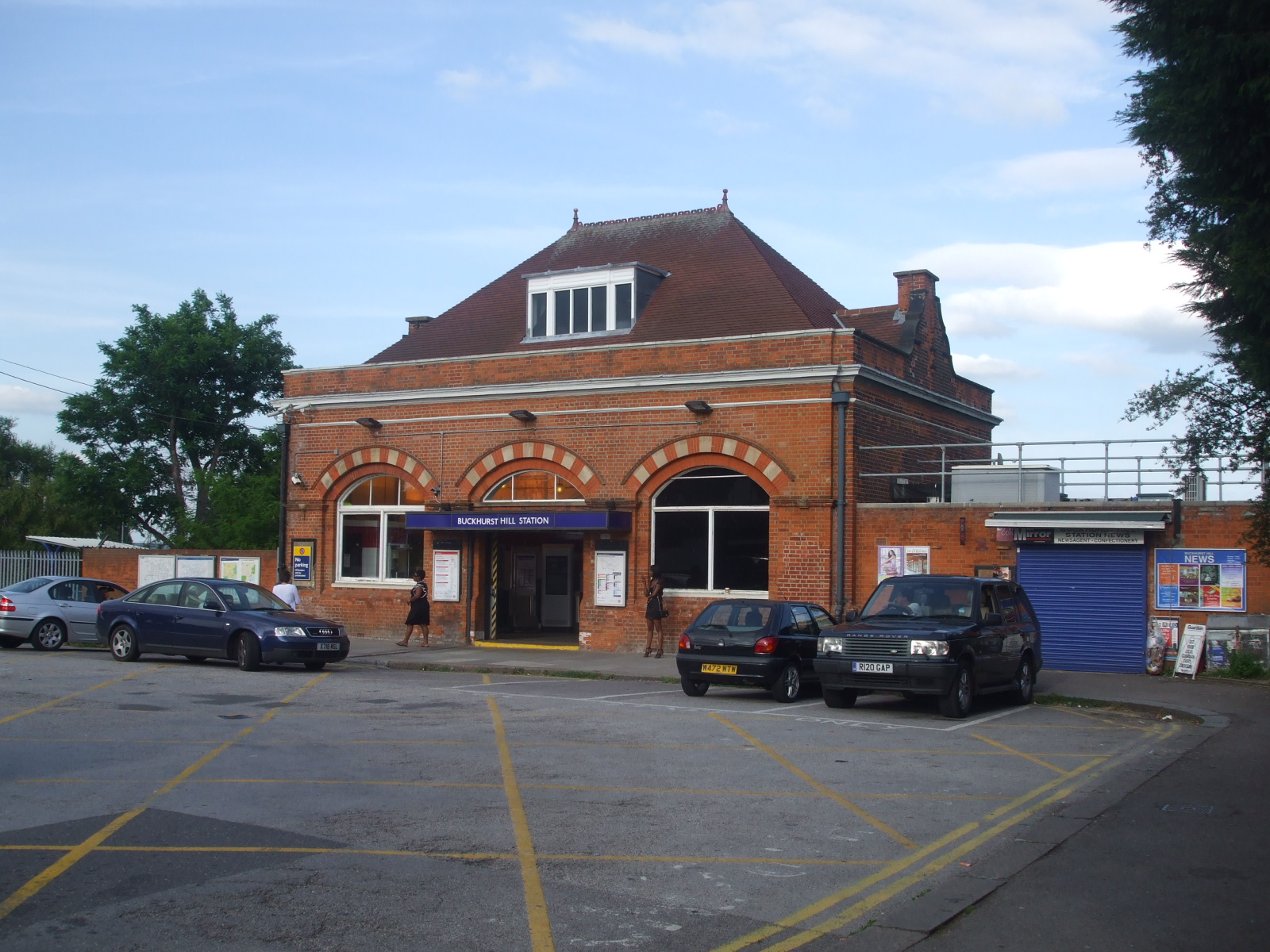
* Buckhurst Hill

=== New Essex stations ===
Shenfield to Southend Line

The stations on this line are still substantially as built by Ashbee:

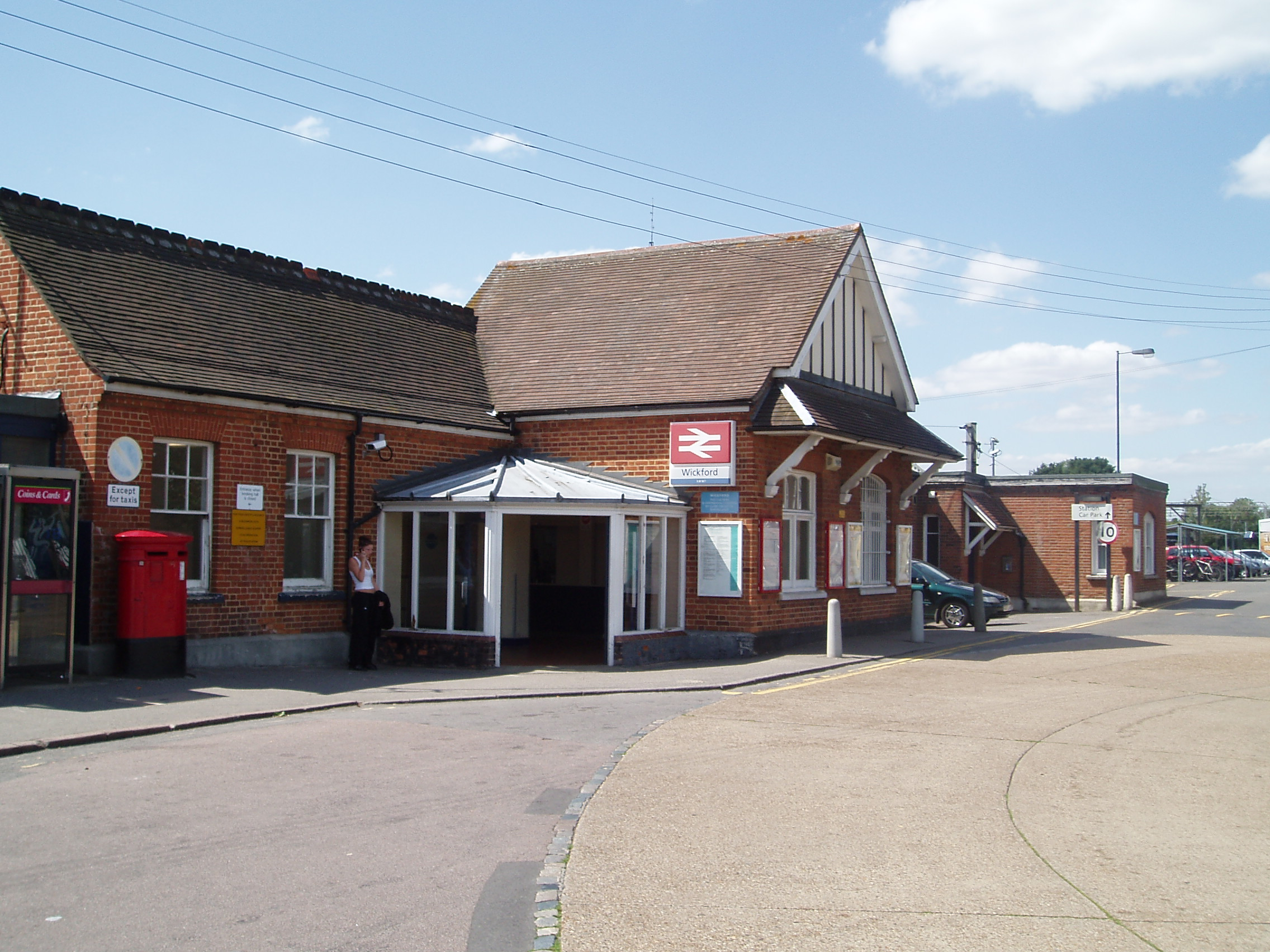
* Wickford

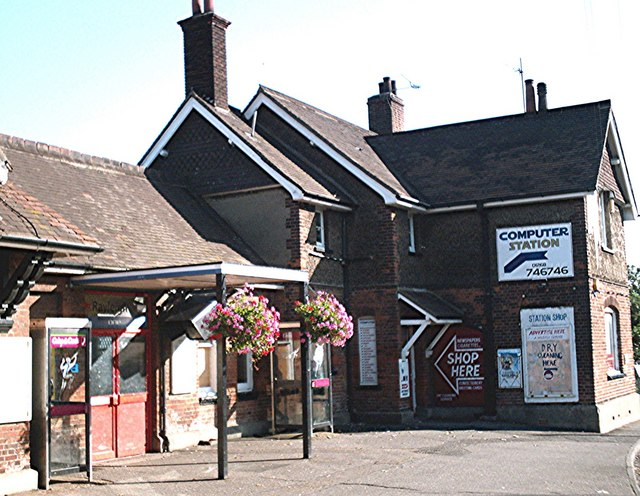
* Rayleigh

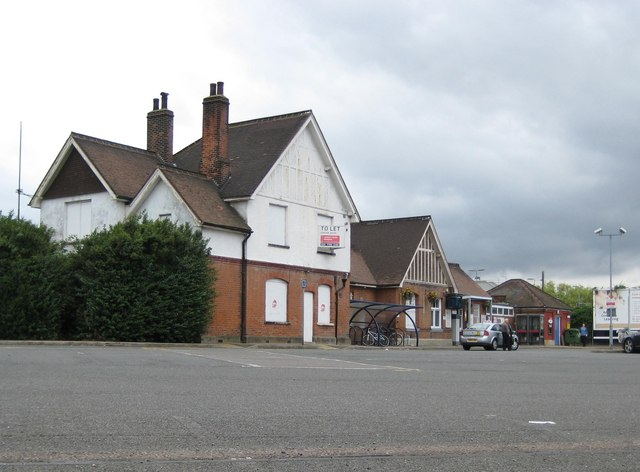
* Rochford

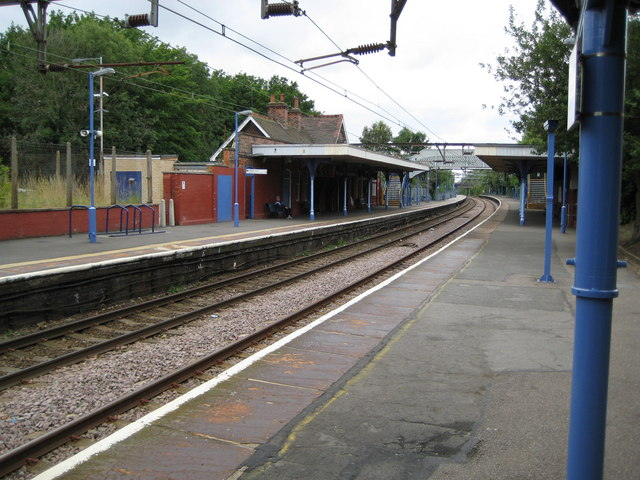
* Prittlewell

- Shenfield
- Billericay
- Hockley
- Southend Victoria

Crouch Valley Line

Most of the original Ashbee buildings on this line were demolished in 1968, although some parts of Burnham and Southminster remain:

- Battlesbridge
- South Woodham Ferrers
- North Fambridge
- Althorne

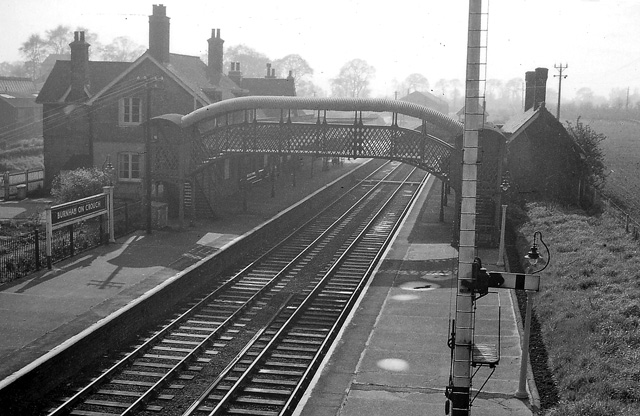
* Burnham-on-Crouch

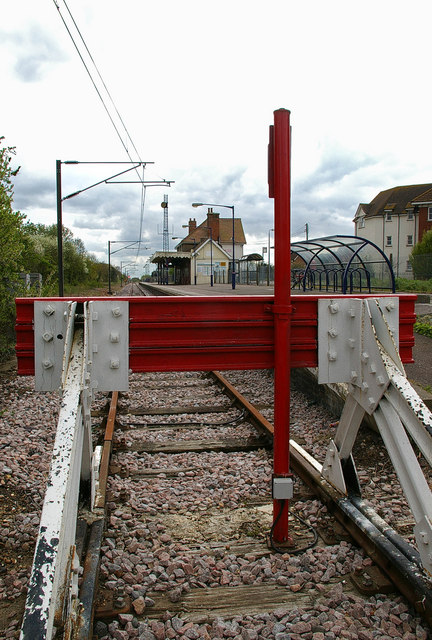
* Southminster

=== Fairlop Loop ===
Six original stations on the Fairlop Loop of the Central line, but originally part of the Great Eastern, were designed by Ashbee:

- Chigwell
- Barkingside
- Grange Hill
- Hainault
- Fairlop
- Newbury Park tube station

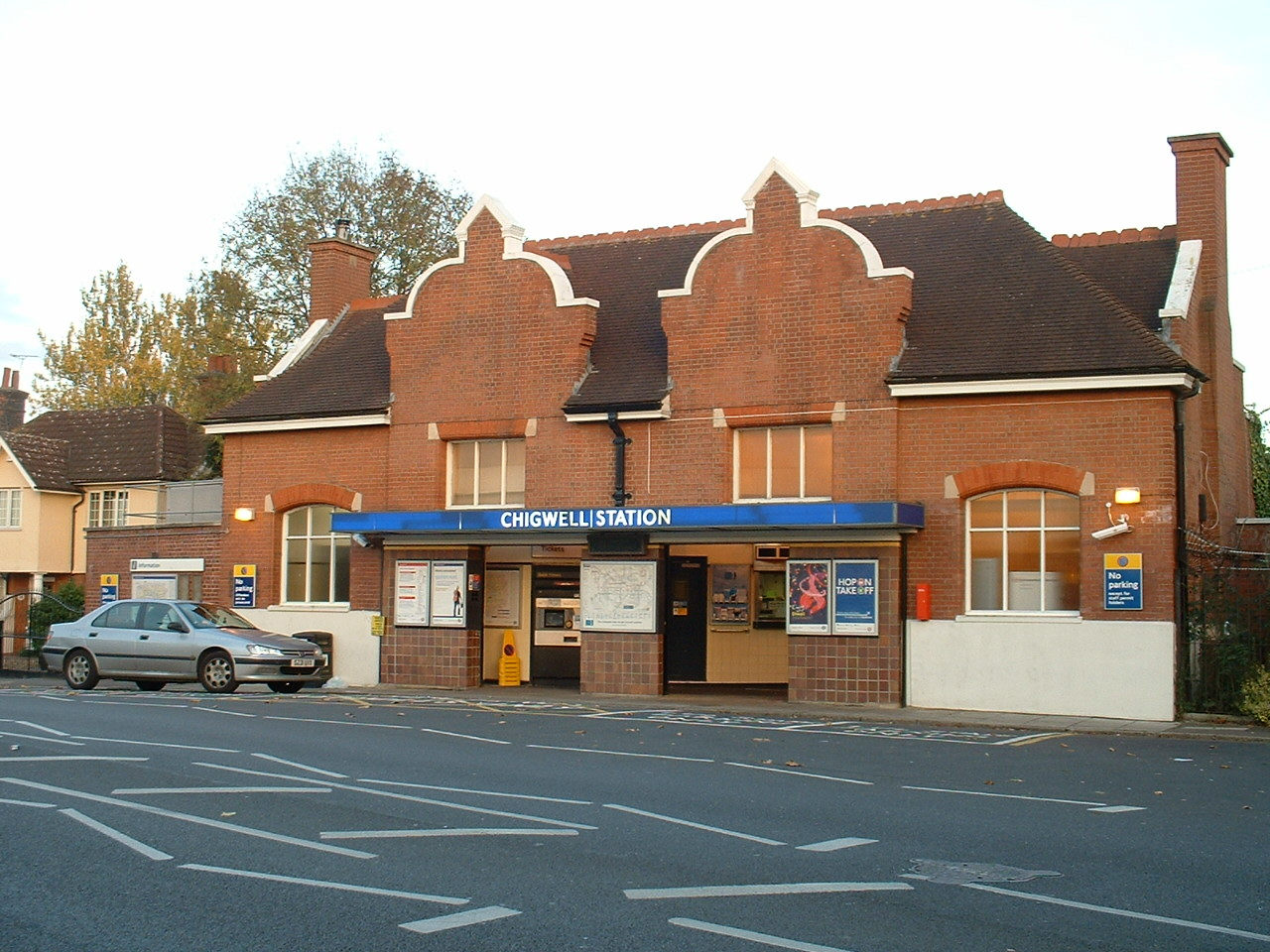
Chigwell

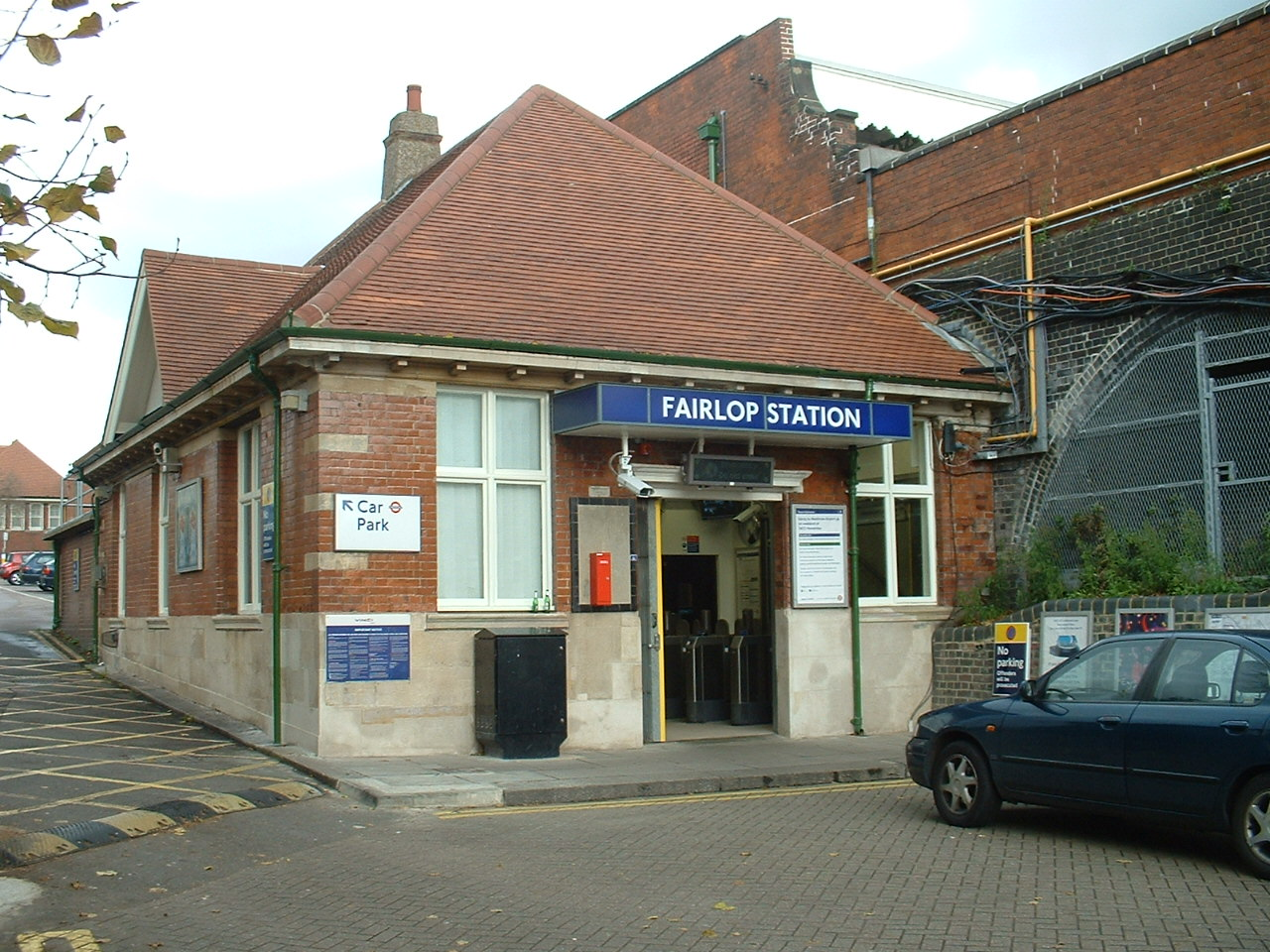
Fairlop

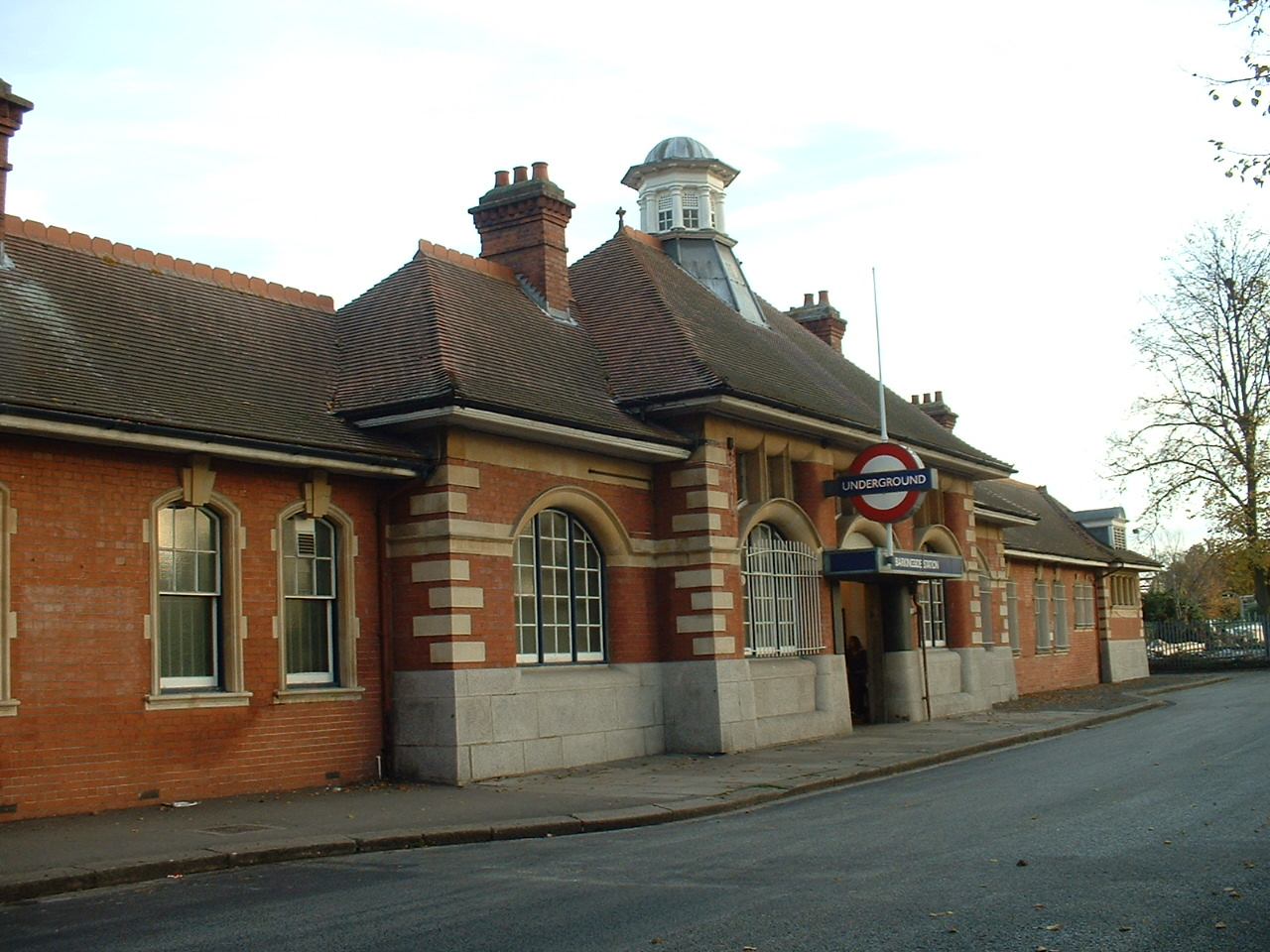
Barkingside

== Personal ==
Ashbee was living at Rose Valley House in Brentwood, Essex at the time of his death in April 1919.
