= High Tory =

Traditionalist variant of Toryism

In the United Kingdom and elsewhere, High Toryism is the old traditionalist conservatism which is in line with the Toryism originating in the 17th century. High Tories and their worldview are sometimes at odds with the modernising elements of the Conservative Party. Historically, the late 18th-century conservatism derived from the Whig Edmund Burke and William Pitt the Younger marks a watershed from the "higher" or legitimist Toryism that was allied to Jacobitism.

High Toryism has been described by Andrew Heywood as neo-feudalist in its preference for a traditional hierarchical and patriarchal society over modern freedom and equality, as well for holding the traditional gentry as a higher cultural benchmark than the bourgeoisie and those who have attained their position through commerce or labour. Economically, High Tories generally tend to prefer paternalistic Tory corporatism and protectionism over the neo-liberalism and neo-conservatism that emerged in the 1960s.

== Views and values ==
=== Historical ===
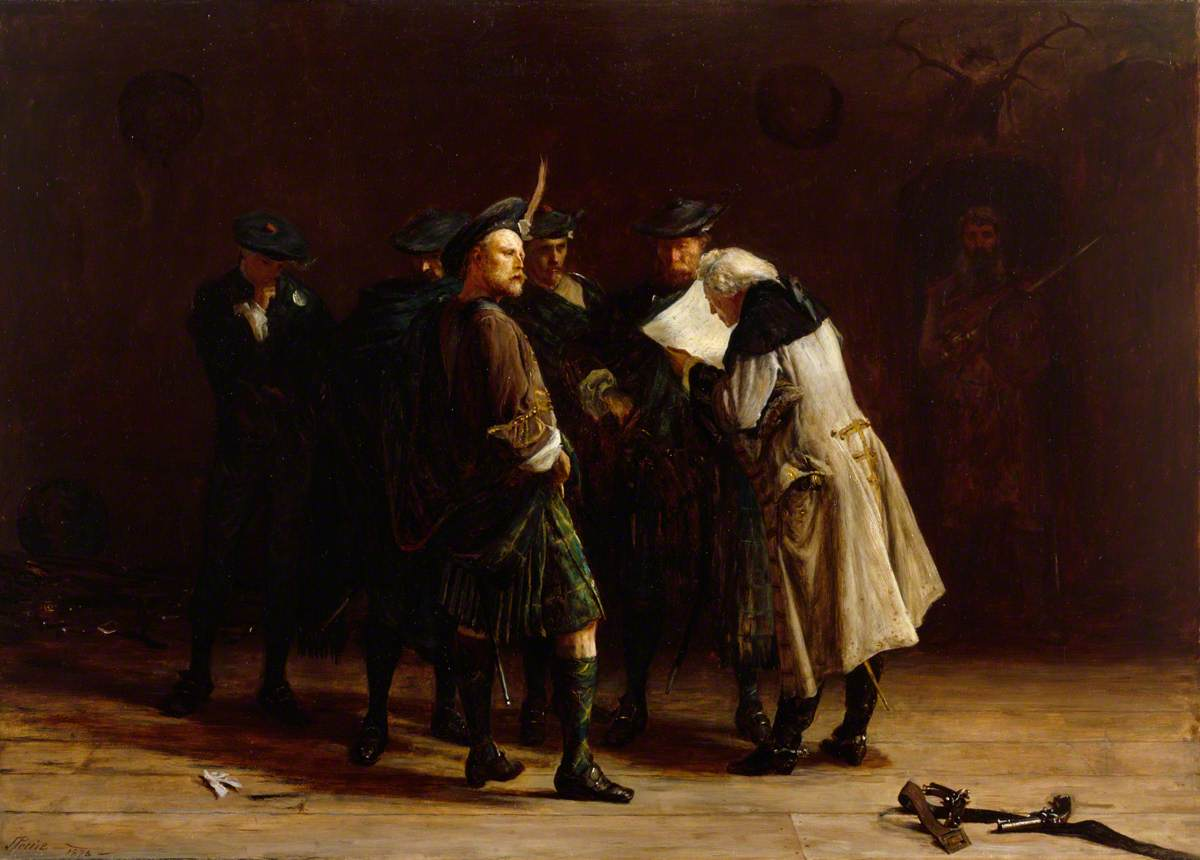
John Pettie's 1874 painting Jacobites, 1745 and its romanticised interpretation of Jacobitism.

The High Tory view in the 18th century preferred lowered taxation and deplored Whig support for a standing army, an expanding empire and navy, and overseas commerce. The main reason was that these were paid for or subsidised by the new English Land Tax that had started in 1692. On religious issues, the High Tories usually rallied under the banner of "Church in Danger", preferred high church Anglicanism, and many covertly supported Jacobitism. In 1709, the Duke of Beaufort founded the Loyal Brotherhood which became a significant influence over the political organisation of High Tories and the wider Tory party. Many High Tories were members of the October Club during the Harley ministry of 1710–14. The long and generally productive Whig premierships of Sir Robert Walpole and William Pitt the Elder, and the continuance of the Hanoverian dynasty, caused opinions to change gradually over the 18th century in line with what is now called "Whig history".

The change was noticeable from the 1760s with the premierships of John Stuart, 3rd Earl of Bute and William Pitt the Younger. The Land Tax Perpetuation Act 1798 reduced the impact of that tax, though the landed gentry's privileges were reduced by the Reform Act 1832. In the reign of Queen Victoria, High Tories now supported the empire and navy, and were personified by the Prime Ministers Lord Derby and Lord Salisbury.

=== Modern ===
High Tories prefer the values of the historical landed gentry and aristocracy, with their noblesse oblige and their self-imposed sense of duty and responsibility to all of society, including the lower classes. Whilst not against private enterprise, they reject the values of the modern commercial business class, which they see as a pursuit of individualistic, unchecked selfishness and greed that destroys a sense of community and holds no regard for religious or high cultural values. Their focus is on maintaining a traditional, rooted society and way of life, which is often as much threatened by modern capitalism as by state socialism. A High Tory also favours a strong organic community, in contrast to Whig, liberal and neoconservative individualism. One-nation conservatism, as influenced by Disraeli and epitomised in leaders such as Balfour, favoured social cohesion, and its adherents support social institutions that maintain harmony between different interest groups and classes.

Examples of British High Tory views from the 20th century onward would be those of the novelists Evelyn Waugh and Anthony Powell, poet T. S. Eliot, philosopher Sir Roger Scruton and Members of Parliament such as Sir John Biggs-Davison, Lord Amery, Alan Clark, Enoch Powell, Sir Peter Tapsell and Hugh Fraser.

The leading pressure-group of High Toryism was possibly the Conservative Monday Club, described by Labour Prime Minister Harold Wilson as "The Conscience of the Tory Party", having been founded in 1961 as a group to support apartheid-era South Africa and Southern Rhodesia, following Harold Macmillan's opposition to white minority rule in these countries; from the early 1980s, the group has been dominated by the Thatcherite wing which opposed traditionalist High Tories. The journal The Spectator is associated with modern High Toryism. The modern High Tory faction within the British Conservative Party would be the Cornerstone Group.

== Positioning and religious affiliation ==
A "High Tory" bears some resemblance to traditionalist conservatives in the United States, particularly paleoconservatives, such as those within the Republican Study Committee. It is difficult and unreliable to make comparisons between High Toryism and other political dispositions internationally.

"High Tory" has been more than just a political term; it is also used to describe a culture and a way of life. A "High Tory" must have an appreciation of religion and high culture. Before the 19th century, High Tories tended to be high church Anglicans and strongly anti-Catholic. However, since the late 19th century and increasingly in the 20th century, High Tories have often been associated with Anglo-Catholicism and traditionalist Catholicism. High Toryism is also associated with agrarianism and gentlemanly virtues.

== See also ==
- Conservative Democratic Alliance
- Cornerstone Group
- London Swinton Circle
- Miguelist
- Powellism
- Red Tory
- Revolutionary Conservative Caucus
- Right Now! (magazine)
- Sanfedismo
- Tories (British political party)
- Traditional Britain Group
- Traditional conservatism
- White movement
