= Nora Heald =

British journalist and editor (1882–1961)

Nora Shackleton Heald (1882 – 5 April 1961) was a British journalist, and the editor of The Queen and later, The Lady, from at least as early as 1948, until 1954.

== Early life ==
Nora Shackleton Heald was born in 1882, the elder daughter of John Thomas Heald, and Mary Shackleton. They were both from Stacksteads, Lancashire, and he was originally a schoolmaster. She had a younger sister, Edith Shackleton Heald, also a journalist, with whom she co-owned the Chantry House. Her brother Ivan Shackleton Heald (1883–1916) was "Fleet Street's most acclaimed humorous writer" until he joined the Royal Flying Corps and died in the First World War.

== Career ==
Heald started in journalism in 1918 as women's page editor for the Sunday Despatch, and went on to be dramatic critic for the Daily Mail, the London columnist for the Daily Chronicle, women's page editor for the Daily Herald, and editor for The Queen and later, The Lady until 1954.

== Personal life ==
Heald was the editor of The Lady in February 1948, when for a time, she moved out of Chantry House in Steyning, which she co-owned with her younger sister, Edith Shackleton Heald, due to the ongoing scandal from her sister's lesbian relationship with the artist Gluck.

== Death ==
Heald died on 5 April 1961.
