= London Swinton Circle =

British advocacy group

The London Swinton Circle (otherwise known as the Swinton Circle) was a British right-wing pressure group. The group's stated purpose was to uphold traditional conservative and Unionist principles.

The group formed part of a number of Conservative Party-linked fringe groups which came to prominence in the 1970s and 1980s, such as the Monday Club, Tory Action and WISE (Welsh, Irish, Scottish, English), but later became positioned outside the Conservative Party.

== History ==
=== Origins ===
A few city-based discussion groups with the suffix "Swinton Circle" were formed for those Conservative Party activists who had attended Conservative Party training at Swinton College. The London Swinton Circle was founded in 1965, early members included Rhodes Boyson and T. E. Utley. Another prominent early member was Roger Moate MP. The London Swinton Circle was the only one of the groups to continue beyond the 1970s.

=== Bee Carthew ===
The London Swinton Circle came to be run during the eighties by Mrs Beryl 'Bee' Carthew who was described by the satirical Private Eye magazine as a "well-known right-wing looney". Carthew had previously formed and ran the "Powellight Association" which published a magazine, Powellight, in support of Enoch Powell during the late 1960s and early 1970s. An executive member of the Monday Club with George Kennedy Young, she was expelled from the Club in 1974 as part of a purge made by Jonathan Guinness. She briefly joined the National Front in 1975, before later rejoining the Conservative Party. She briefly ran the London Office for the nascent UK Independence Party (UKIP).

=== From the early 1980s ===
In the early 1980s, the group held several meetings of "right-wing Tories and neo-fascists" with the aim of "co-ordinating anti-immigration campaigns". By this time, the Conservative Party was concerned that "co-ordinating groups" like the Swinton Circle were being infiltrated by the far right. Its most commented-upon meeting was in 1983 with Ivor Benson as guest speaker. Revelations about the extreme-right past of one member led to a motion in Parliament.

Adrian Davies was for a time secretary of the Circle after Bee Carthew. He is now in the Traditional Britain Group.

=== Allan Robertson ===
From 1992 to 2020 the Circle was run by Allan Robertson, a former member of the Scottish Monday Club and contributing editor of Right Now! magazine. Robertson produced a newsletter Tough Talking From The Right magazine. Robertson died unexpectedly in February 2020. Following his death the Swinton Circle was wound up.

=== Critics ===
Conservative MPs, including Liam Fox and Owen Paterson, were criticised in 2014 for speaking to the group whose publications have expressed views such as the mass deportation of British people of African descent to Africa. The Circle had also suggested that "an earthquake in New Zealand might have been a warning against gay marriage".

Sheila Gilmore MP described the Circle as holding "vile views" and has questioned why the Conservative Party continues to be associated with the group.

== Policies ==
The Circle was strongly Unionist and supported the restoration of capital punishment, and was against immigration and same-sex marriage. It backed Brexit, although the Swinton Circle continued to endorse the Conservative Party.

== See also ==
- Conservative Monday Club
- Conservative Democratic Alliance
