= Ivor Benson =

South African polemicist (1907–1993)

Ivor Benson (November 1907 – January 1993) was a journalist, right-wing essayist, anti-communist and white supremacist. From 1964 to 1966 he was a Rhodesian government official and censor. He strongly supported apartheid in South Africa. He also wrote frequently about a global Jewish/Communist conspiracy; his main book on the subject, This Worldwide Conspiracy, was supported by the right-wing London Swinton Circle and recommended by the neo-Nazi National Front (UK). Benson blamed the BBC, Wall Street banking interests, the government of the Soviet Union, and the World Council of Churches as drivers of a global conspiracy to wipe out his preferred nationalism.

== Life and activities ==
Benson was born in South Africa. He started out as a journalist in Durban before later moving to London where he wrote for the Daily Telegraph and the Daily Express.

During the Second World War he enlisted in the British Army in South Africa, and returned to journalism there after the war. He became a news commentator at Radio South Africa and broadcaster for the South African Broadcasting Corporation. He became chief assistant editor of the Rand Daily Mail; however, after he wrote an editorial in favour of fascist Sir Oswald Mosley, who was staying with him, he was sacked.

Benson was a strong supporter of apartheid. He opposed any form of racial integration, and any change to white minority rule in Africa.

Invited to Rhodesia by P. K. van der Byl, who knew Benson was strongly against any increase in rights for black Africans, from 1964 to 1966 Benson served as Director of the Government Information Department to the Rhodesian government under Ian Smith. In Rhodesia, he wrote speeches for Smith, re-organized the once-neutral state information department into an active propaganda agency, served as state-empowered press censor, and spoke for the anti-communist Rhodesian Front.

Benson was most likely involved in a black propaganda effort aimed at electors in the UK, in an effort to sway the 1966 Kingston upon Hull North by-election. A pamphlet was sent to UK electors, supposedly printed by the "Tudor Rose Society for the Protection of the British Way of Life", which did not exist. Benson left Rhodesia when Smith shifted to a more moderate stance.

Benson would author many books and essays alleging a Jewish world conspiracy. He wrote articles for magazines abroad, such as Western Destiny, The Journal of Historical Review, and The Spotlight. In 1966, he became co-editor of the American magazine The American Mercury as it merged with two Nazi papers to adopt an explicitly pro-Nazi/anti-semitic/white supremacy stance. He produced a newsletter, Behind the News, and in the 1970s founded a fascist group called the National Forum, and would head the South African chapter of the World Anti-Communist League. He was the South African correspondent of the Crown Commonwealth League of Rights and hosted to Eric Butler in 1970.

In late 1980 or early 1981, Benson told a South African government "Commission of Inquiry into the Mass Media" that South Africans were being inundated by outsider views carried by the two largest newspaper agencies in South Africa, the Argus Group and South African Associated Newspapers (SAAN), both financed from England. Benson said these agencies were controlled by the "international capitalist-communist conspiracy", and that they were effectively foreign agents waging undeclared war on South Africa. Benson recommended that the press in South Africa should become an organ of state policy as in Taiwan.

Benson would travel worldwide promoting his views. In 1983 he spoke to the Swinton Circle in London, and to the Canadian League of Rights in Canada. In 1986, Benson wrote a speech, delivered in absentia, for a conference of the Holocaust denial group, the Institute for Historical Review (IHR).

== Bibliography ==
=== Books ===
- The Opinion Makers. Pretoria, South Africa: Dolphin Press (1967).
- This Worldwide Conspiracy. Victoria, Australia: New Times Press, in association with Dolphin Press (1972).
- Behind Communism in Africa. Pretoria, South Africa: Dolphin Press (1977).
- Rhodesia and South Africa:The Moment of Truth. Pretoria, South Africa: Dolphin Press (1977).
- The Battle for South Africa. Durban, South Africa: Dolphin Press (1979).
- Truth Out of Africa. Bullsbrook, Western Australia: Veritas Publishing Company (1984). 2nd edition, with three new chapters.
- The Zionist Factor: A Study of the Jewish Presence in 20th Century History. Bullsbrook, Western Australia: Veritas Publishing Company (1986).
- This Age of Conflict: The Source and Technology of Illegitimate Power. Durban, South Africa: Dolphin Press (1987)

=== Newsletters ===
- Behind the News (monthly). Durban, South Africa: Dolphin Press.
