= Ron Gostick =

Canadian far-right publisher and political activist

Ronald A. Gostick
- Born: July 18, 1918; Merthyr Tydfil, Wales
- Died: July 16, 2005 (aged 86); Flesherton, Ontario, Canada
- Occupations: Publisher, political activist
- Known for: Founder of the Canadian League of Rights
- Spouse(s): Jeanette Windsor (died 1985); Wanda Lee Anne Donovan
- Children: 6

Ronald A. Gostick (July 18, 1918 – July 16, 2005) was a Canadian far-right publisher and political activist who founded the Canadian League of Rights. He was involved in the Canadian social credit movement and published far-right and antisemitic material for more than 50 years, including the Canadian Intelligence Service and On Target!.

== Early life ==
Gostick was born in Merthyr Tydfil, Wales, to Canadian parents, who brought him to Canada after the First World War. The family established a homestead near Stettler, Alberta, before moving to Calgary. His mother, Edith Gostick, represented a Calgary constituency in William Aberhart's Social Credit government from 1935 to 1940 and introduced him to social credit ideas.

== Social credit activities ==
Gostick served in the Canadian Army during the Second World War and worked as a court reporter in Ottawa and Toronto. He served as national secretary of the Social Credit Party of Canada before leaving that position and settling in Walter's Falls, Ontario.

In the 1945 federal election, he ran as the Social Credit candidate in Grey North, finishing last among four candidates with 250 votes.

In late 1946, Gostick founded and was the Ontario leader of the Union of Electors, a provincial social credit organization inspired by Quebec's Union des électeurs. He was also editor of its newspaper, The Voice of the Electors, published in Toronto. He accepted the party's nomination for Glengarry in the 1948 Ontario general election. He had helped organize the party in the constituency the previous year. Local organizers offered him the nomination at a meeting in April 1948, and he accepted by telephone.

The Union of Electors fielded 13 candidates in the June 7 election, while two candidates ran under the Social Credit label. Neither group won a seat; the Union received approximately 0.5 per cent of the provincial vote. Gostick finished third in Glengarry with 642 votes, behind Progressive Conservative Osie Villeneuve, who received 5,557 votes, and Liberal Edmund A. MacGillivray, who received 3,769.

In 1949, the Ontario Union of Electors was accused by the Toronto Labour Council of "disseminating racial hatred in its crudest form."

== Publishing and anti-communist campaigns ==
In 1949, Gostick began publishing The Social Credit, a newsletter intended to represent grassroots social credit views but unaffiliated with any Social Credit political party. The newsletter promoted his conspiracy claims about Zionism and ceased publication in 1950. Around 1950, Gostick and his family moved to Flesherton, Ontario. He established Canadian Intelligence Publications, which published the Canadian Intelligence Service and operated a mail-order business distributing far-right literature. The Canadian Intelligence Service was published for 54 years.

Gostick edited and published The Architects Behind the World Communist Conspiracy in 1951. The pamphlet alleged a Jewish conspiracy behind international communism and linked Zionism to communist subversion in Canada and abroad. In the early 1950s, he spoke at meetings sponsored by American far-right activists Gerald L. K. Smith and Wesley Swift.

Gostick worked with Patrick Walsh, a former communist who claimed to have been an undercover agent for the Royal Canadian Mounted Police. Walsh contributed to Gostick's publications. In a November 1963 issue of the Canadian Intelligence Service, Gostick defended Walsh against critics who questioned his account of his work for the police.

Gostick accused the CBC of disseminating communist propaganda. In a brief to the Royal Commission on Broadcasting in 1956, he cited the broadcast of Reuben Ship's satirical radio play The Investigator as evidence of a communist conspiracy within the broadcaster.

In 1963, Gostick and Walsh brought libel actions against the CBC over remarks allegedly made by New Democratic Party MP Douglas Fisher on the program Assignment. The actions were subsequently dismissed.

In 1968, Gostick accused Prime Minister Pierre Trudeau of communist sympathies. He claimed to have distributed approximately 150,000 leaflets on the subject and to have 10,000 regular subscribers to his publications.

== Canadian League of Rights ==
In the late 1940s and early 1950s, Gostick organized the Canadian Anti-Communist League. Its stated purpose was to expose the "Communist-Zionist-monopolist-finance enemy of Christian civilization". The organization subsequently became the Christian Action Movement and then the Canadian League of Rights, which was based for much of its existence in Flesherton.

In 1964, Social Credit leader Robert N. Thompson withdrew his support for the Christian Action Movement after receiving protests about the organization. Thompson stated that the Social Credit Party had no connection with Gostick's Canadian Intelligence Publications.

Gostick collaborated with John Ross Taylor and mentored Paul Fromm. Walsh worked as the league's research director. Former Member of Parliament John A. Gamble worked with Gostick as a Canadian leader of the World Anti-Communist League in the 1980s.

According to the Canadian Jewish Congress, Jim Keegstra obtained most of his reading material through his membership in Gostick's league. Sociologist Stanley R. Barrett, in Is God a Racist? The Right Wing in Canada, classified Gostick within the "fringe right".

B'nai Brith Canada described the league as having a history of supporting racist and antisemitic positions. David Lethbridge, founder of the Salmon Arm Coalition Against Racism, argued that Gostick and the league presented a fascist message in a form that appeared mainstream.

== Personal life and death ==
Gostick was married to Jeanette Windsor, an elementary school principal in Flesherton. They had six children. His second wife was Wanda Lee Anne Donovan.

Gostick was a member of Kinsmen and the Royal Canadian Legion. In Flesherton, he coached hockey and helped raise funds for the local arena. Wanda assisted with his publishing activities.

Gostick died of cancer in Flesherton on July 16, 2005, two days before his 87th birthday.

== Publications ==
Gostick's publications included books and pamphlets that he wrote, co-wrote or edited:

- The Architects Behind the World Communist Conspiracy (1951), published by the Canadian Anti-Communist League.
- Zionism and the Middle East Crisis (1958), published by Canadian Intelligence Publications as the supplementary section of the August 1958 issue of the Canadian Intelligence Service.
- Canada: The Moment of Truth (1978), as editor, published by Canadian Intelligence Publications.
- The Battle for Canada, with Eric D. Butler, published by the Canadian League of Rights; a second edition appeared circa 1980.
- A Prophecy? (1980), with an introduction by Gostick, published by the Canadian League of Rights.
- Trudeau's 'Master Plan' for the Betrayal of Canada (1981), published by the Canadian League of Rights.
- Canada's Future: More Debt and Bankruptcy? Or Financial Reform and Prosperity? (2002).
- Canada: Its Glorious Potential ... and Things I Didn't Learn in School (2004), an expanded second edition of Canada's Future, published by Canadian Intelligence Publications.

== Electoral record ==
1945 Canadian federal election: Grey North
| Party | Candidate | Votes |
|---|---|---|
| Progressive Conservative | W. Garfield Case | 9,204 |
| Liberal | Findlay MacDonald | 7,570 |
| Co-operative Commonwealth | David T. Waddell | 1,145 |
| Social Credit | Ron Gostick | 250 |

1948 Ontario general election: Glengarry
| Party | Candidate | Votes | % | ±% |
|---|---|---|---|---|
| Progressive Conservative | Osie Villeneuve | 5,557 | 55.75 | +16.68 |
| Liberal | Edmund MacGillivray | 3,769 | 37.81 | –17.09 |
| Union of Electors | Ron Gostick | 642 | 6.44 | – |
| Total valid votes | | 9,968 | 99.12 | |
| Total rejected ballots | | 88 | 0.88 | +0.10 |
| Turnout | | 10,056 | 71.63 | –1.51 |
| Eligible voters | | 14,039 | | |
| Progressive Conservative gain from Liberal | | Swing | | +16.88 |
Source: Elections Ontario
