= Conservative Democratic Alliance =

British political pressure group

The Conservative Democratic Alliance (CDA) was a political pressure group from the United Kingdom. The CDA referred to itself as the "authentic voice of conservatism". It closed in December 2008.

== Foundation and organisation ==
The CDA was formed mostly by disaffected members of the Conservative Monday Club, another right-wing pressure group, who disagreed with the club's response to the Conservative Party's severing of links with the club in 2001. The Daily Telegraph described the CDA as "a hardline offshoot of the Monday Club".

The group was described as "ultra-right" by the Commission for Racial Equality.

The group's chairman was Michael Keith Smith, commonly known as Mike Smith, who had been a member of the Conservative Monday Club since the early 1970s, and served on its Executive Council, 1986–1993.

Original members of the CDA's steering committee included:

- Sam Swerling, a Conservative Party parliamentary candidate twice in 1974 and councillor (1978–82) on Westminster City Council.
- Stuart Millson, an independent councillor for East Malling and Larkfield Parish Council, and founder, with Jonathan Bowden, of the short-lived Revolutionary Conservative Caucus.
- Gregory Lauder-Frost, former Political Secretary, and Foreign Affairs Committee Chairman, of the Monday Club.

== Politics ==
On 27 June 2002, The Daily Telegraph carried a letter from the CDA, signed by Mike Smith, attacking the Conservative Party and its chairman Francis Maude for "the sleaze, double-dealing, arrogance, incompetence, Europhilia, indifference and drift with which the party is still associated. "Voters", he wrote, "deserve a real alternative to Blairism and his 'straight kinda guy' chicanery. Mr. Maude and his C-Changing Tories are incapable of providing it." ("C-Change" was a now-defunct Tory modernising pressure group headed by Maude.)

The CDA often criticised free-market economics and Americanisation in the United Kingdom, both of which it perceived to be after-effects of Thatcherism. That may be seen as distinguishing it from Iain Duncan Smith's Conservative Party leadership, which CDA members often criticised as neoconservative. The CDA was also fervently opposed to the European Union and to close links with the George W. Bush administration.

== Activities ==
The CDA held what was described as "a packed meeting of right-wingers" in a hotel at the Conservative Party conference in Bournemouth on 11 October 2002, chaired by Mike Smith, who accused Conservative Party Chief Whip David Maclean of gagging his party's MPs over the EU, declaring him "a disgrace to the party." The meeting was addressed by:

- Roger Knapman, then leader of the UK Independence Party;
- Ashley Mote, then a UKIP Member of the European Parliament and author of Overcrowded Britain – Our Immigration Crisis Exposed (2004);
- John Gouriet, a founder with Norris McWhirter of The Freedom Association;
- Derek Turner, editor of Right Now! and the Quarterly Review magazines;
- Sam Swerling, a consultant solicitor, Law Lecturer and former Monday Club chairman, who described Theresa May, MP, as "a third-rate operator";
- Adrian Davies, then chairman of the Freedom Party, a barrister-at-law, who said "the ideal candidate for the Conservatives now was a black, one-legged lesbian."

On 6 October 2004, the Conservative Democratic Alliance held another meeting as a fringe event at the Conservative Party Conference, again in Bournemouth, in tribute to Enoch Powell.

The CDA planned to field its own candidates against Conservative MPs with small majorities at the 2005 General Election, concentrating on Oliver Letwin, the then Shadow Treasury Spokesman and MP for West Dorset, whom they described as "simply not a Conservative at all".

In the event no candidates stood for the CDA at the 2005 General Election, and Letwin held his seat. However, CDA Chairman Michael Keith Smith stood as the UKIP candidate for Portsmouth North. Unsuccessful Tory candidate Penny Mordaunt and political commentator Richard North blamed Smith's intervention for the Tories' failure to win back the seat.

The CDA's June 2005 Summer Dinner in Fleet Street, London, was addressed by the 'metric martyr', Neil Herron, who led the campaign against the adoption of the metric system in the UK. The previous year Herron had stood as an independent candidate in European Elections for North East England, gaining almost 40,000 votes, over 5.1%.

The CDA produced a regular bulletin, and maintained a website with discussion forums (now defunct).

== Controversies ==
An anti-Conservative Party advertisement for the CDA was published in Right Now!, containing the statement that the CDA was "horrified by Tory frontbench spokesmen advocating gay lifestyles and New Labour ideas". Andrew Hunter MP withdrew his patronage from the magazine due to the appearance of the advert, saying that he was 'appalled' by the "antics" of the CDA and that he no longer wanted to be associated with the magazine "in any way".

Michael Keith Smith later described the advertisement, written by former CDA supporter Peter Gibbs, as "regrettably homophobic". Smith branded the incident "an untoward event" and promised that CDA will take a more "forward-looking and inclusive role in future".

In 2002, Iain Duncan Smith expelled CDA Chairman Mike Smith from the Conservative Party for threatening to stand candidates against Conservatives. Mike Smith issued a writ claiming Breach of Natural Justice and the party was obliged to re-admit him to membership. Soon afterwards, Smith resigned from the Conservative Party, and stood in the May 2005 general election as the UKIP parliamentary candidate for Portsmouth North, where the Labour victory was claimed by the Conservative candidate to be a result of the UKIP candidacy, a claim also made by Richard North of the Bruges Group.

During 2008 Mike Smith rapidly changed his stance and announced on the CDA's forum that he had rejoined the Conservative Party: "After wide-ranging initial doubts, Mike Smith has now enthusiastically accepted David Cameron's reform agenda and returned to the Conservative Party from UKIP." As a result, the CDA Committee met in September 2008 and agreed that it would be best if the CDA were wound up. In December, Mike Smith announced on the CDA forums that the CDA would be disbanding as he himself had now come to support the Tories again and wanted to campaign for them in the run-up to the next UK general election. He circulated a letter to all members and supporters saying that the CDA would be effectively replaced by the Traditional Britain Group and urging their support.

Michael Keith Smith committed suicide at Portchester, Fareham in Hampshire, on 3 July 2010.
