= Mike Bond =

American poet

Mike Bond is an American novelist, ecologist, war and human rights journalist, and poet.

Bond has been called the "master of the existential thriller" by the BBC and "one of the 21st Century's most exciting authors" by The Washington Times. A bestselling novelist, environmental activist, advisor to U.S. and foreign governments, international energy expert, war and human rights correspondent and award-winning poet, he has lived and worked in many remote, dangerous parts of the world, including 30 countries on six continents.

He was a correspondent for The Financial Times newsletters in Paris from 1990 to 1998, and has reported for many newspapers including The Dallas Morning News (December 26, 1983), The San Francisco Chronicle (April 26, 1999), The Denver Post (September 13, 2001) and The Oregonian (December 8, 1983). He was the co-presenter of the PBS news program European Journal in 1987, produced by Deutsche Welle in Cologne, Germany.

Bond was a Democratic candidate for the United States Senate in Montana in 1982. In Al Gore's 2000 presidential campaign, he was head of Colorado Business Leaders for Gore and a spokesman in several western states (Colorado, Utah, and Oregon) for Gore environmental positions.

Bond was project manager of several Wild and Scenic River and National Wildlife Refuge master plans, worked to protect the Allagash Wilderness Waterway in Maine, helped create Montana's Lee Metcalf Wilderness and California's Golden Gate National Recreation Area; fought elephant poaching in Africa, managed the NASA/AIA project to design part of the orbiting space station and helped write the Colorado Wolf Management Plan. A former presenter of the PBS new program European Journal, he was also Paris energy correspondent for The Financial Times.

As a human rights journalist, Bond has covered death squads and military dictatorships in Latin America, the Middle East and Africa. He has also written widely on environmental issues including elephant slaughter and species decline in Africa, worldwide habitat loss, whales, wolves, seals and many other endangered species, renewable energy and climate change.

Also the former CEO of an international energy company, he has been an advisor to more than 70 of the world's largest energy companies and led the 28-nation task force that united the former Soviet Union's electricity grid with Western Europe's, and has written many studies on climate change, renewable energy and utility siting and operation.

Bond now works in environmental campaigns worldwide and is a leader in the fight against industrial wind turbines and their desecration of our last natural areas. He has written and spoken internationally on the failure of wind projects to lower greenhouse gas emissions or fossil fuel use, and on their devastating environmental, social and fiscal impacts.

Kirkus called Bond's book, House of Jaguar a "high-octane story rife with action, from U.S. streets to Guatemalan jungles". Bond bases his works on his own experiences in war zones, revolutions and dangerous regions in many foreign countries during his years as a journalist. He has more recently worked on international problems relating to Islamic fundamentalism and terrorism, the subject of one of his latest novels, Assassins.

== Bibliography ==
- 1985 Fire Like The Sun (St. Martin's/Marek, New York)
- 1990 The Insider's Guide to Kenya (CFW Publications, Hong Kong), nonfiction
- 1992 The Insider's Guide to Mexico (CFW Publications, Hong Kong), nonfiction
- 1992 The Ivory Hunters (Hodder Headline, London)
- 1993 Night of the Dead (Hodder Headline, London)
- 1994 Crossfire (Hodder Headline, London)
- 2013 The Last Savanna (Mandevilla Press, Connecticut)
- 2013 House of Jaguar (Mandevilla Press, Connecticut)
- 2014 Holy War (Mandevilla Press, Connecticut)
- 2014 Tibetan Cross (Mandevilla Press, Connecticut)
- 2016 Assassins (Mandevilla Press, Connecticut)
- 2017 Snow (Mandevilla Press, Connecticut)
- 2018 The Drum That Beats Within US (Big City Press, New York)
- 2022 Joy (Big City Press, New York)

=== Pono Hawkins series ===
- 2012 Saving Paradise (Mandevilla Press, Connecticut)
- 2015 Killing Maine (Mandevilla Press, Connecticut)
- 2019 Goodbye Paris (Big City Press, New York)

=== America trilogy ===
- 2021 America (Big City Press, New York)
- 2021 Freedom (Big City Press, New York)
- 2022 Revolution (Big City Press, New York)
