= Edith Shackleton Heald =

British journalist (1885–1976)

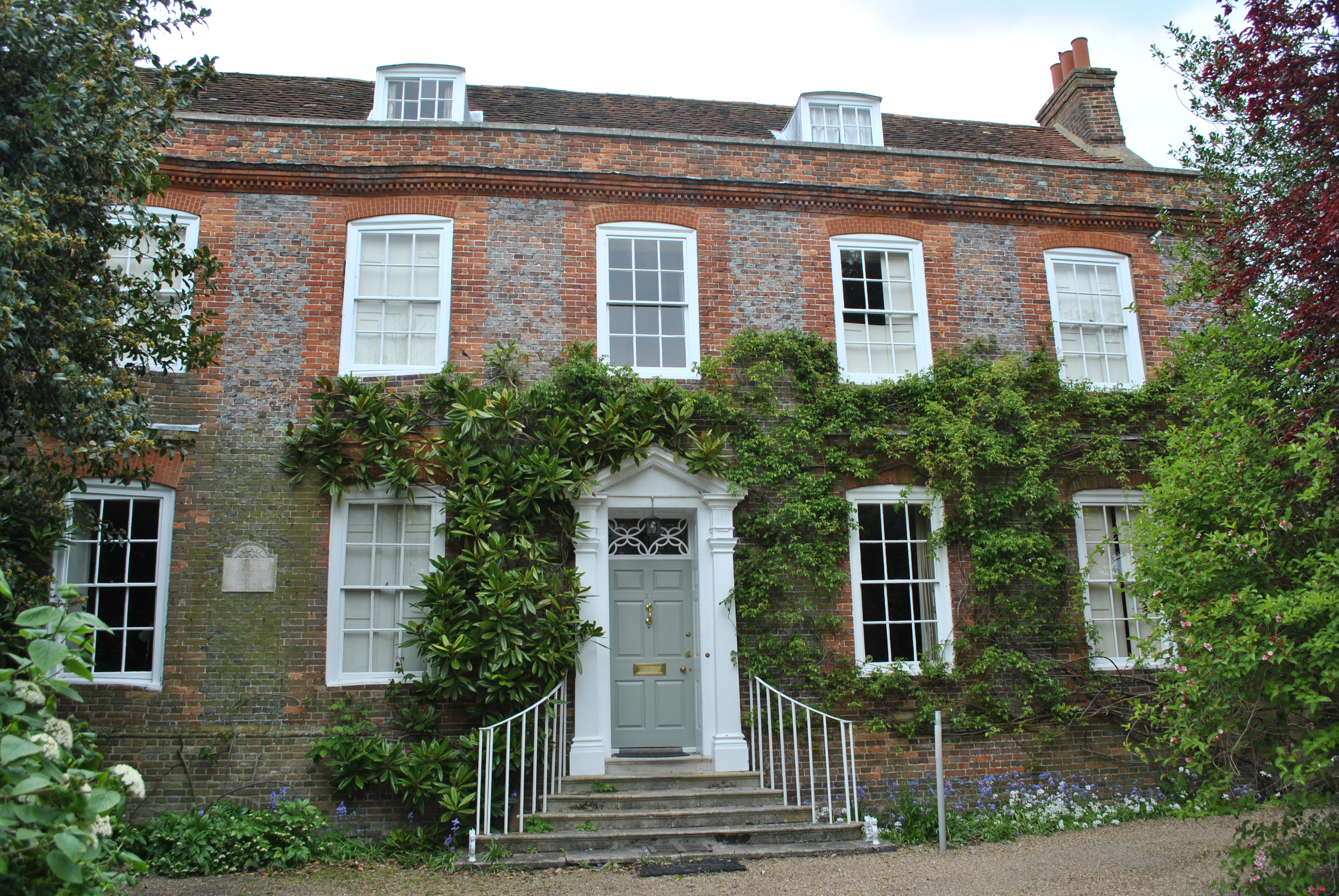
Chantry House, Steyning, 2017

Edith Shackleton Heald (12 September 1885 – 4 November 1976) was a British journalist who was the last mistress of the poet W. B. Yeats from 1937 until his death in 1939, and lived with the lesbian and gender non-conforming artist Gluck from 1944 until her death in 1976.

Yeats called her "the best paid woman journalist of her time", and Arnold Bennett called her the "most brilliant reviewer" in London.

== Early life ==
Heald was born 12 September 1885 in Ballyclare, co. Antrim, Ireland, the younger daughter of John Thomas Heald and Mary Shackleton. They were both from Stacksteads, Lancashire; he was originally a schoolmaster. Heald had an older sister, Nora Shackleton Heald, with whom she co-owned the Chantry House. Nora went on to be editor of The Queen and The Lady. Her brother Ivan Shackleton Heald (1883–1916) was "Fleet Street's most acclaimed humorous writer" until he joined the Royal Flying Corps and died in the First World War.

== Career ==
Heald was a "pioneering reporter" and a special correspondent for the London Evening Standard, and also wrote for the Daily Express, the Sunday Express and the Daily Sketch. She was not the only lesbian writing for the Evening Standard in the 1930s, as Evelyn Irons moved there from the Daily Mail while recovering from a "tempestuous affair" with Vita Sackville-West.

== Personal life ==
W. B. Yeats was introduced to Heald in April 1937 by Edmund Dulac and Helen Beauclerc, and she became his last mistress. Yeats spent a good deal of time at her home, the Chantry House in Steyning, Sussex, where she lived with her sister Nora.

R. F. Foster, Yeats' official biographer, wrote: "While no longer capable of full intercourse, his relationship with Edith was intensely sexual: surviving blurry snapshots show her sunbathing bare-breasted in the Steyning garden under his rapturous gaze." In his biography of Yeats, W. J. McCormack states that they had sexual relations but that Heald was a lesbian.

When Yeats died on 28 January 1939, his wife George and Heald were at his bedside at the Hôtel Idéal Séjour in Roquebrune-Cap-Martin. Heald was present for his burial at Roquebrune cemetery.

In 1944, Gluck moved into The Chantry House in Steyning to live with Heald. Gluck was still in love with a previous lover, Nesta Obermer, whom Gluck considered a "wife", even though Nesta was married to the much older American, Seymour Obermer, who funded her extravagant lifestyle. Obermer enjoyed her life of international travel, arts patronage and parties, and was unwilling to divorce her wealthy husband, even if it had been possible in the 1930s. Gluck was still deeply in love with Nesta, Heald resented Nesta's hold on Gluck's affections, and Nora was jealous of Heald's love for Gluck.

== Death ==
Heald died on 4 November 1976, and Gluck on 10 January 1978.
