= Crown Commonwealth League of Rights =

Umbrella organisation of the World Anti-Communist League

The Crown Commonwealth League of Rights was an umbrella organisation founded in 1972 by Eric Butler for the various League of Rights organisations and to achieve membership of the World Anti-Communist League. Those organisations were:

- Australian League of Rights
- British League of Rights
- Canadian League of Rights
- New Zealand League of Rights
