= Australian League =

The Australian League may refer to:

== Sports ==
- The A-League - the top level of association football in Australia and New Zealand
- The Australian Football League the top level of Australian Rules Football in Australia

== Politics ==
- The Australian League of Rights is an Australian political movement.
