= Canadian League of Rights =

The Canadian League of Rights (CLR) was the Canadian offshoot of Eric Butler's Australian League of Rights. Following speaking tours of Canada in the mid-1960s, Eric Butler sought to establish of a local version of his organisation. The CLR was formed in 1968.

The CLR was run for most of its existence by Ron Gostick and Patrick Walsh. Like its sister organisations, the CLR adheres to social credit and antisemitism. Stanley R. Barrett, author of Is God a Racist? The Right Wing in Canada and various studies race and ethnicity in Canada, suggested that the CLR had 10,000 members at its peak. The CLR was described as "one of Canada's largest and best organized anti-Semitic groups" in the 1987 book A Trust Betrayed. A notable member was Jim Keegstra.

The CLR linked with various groups such as the Alliance for the Preservation of English in Canada and ran a book service selling Holocaust denial material. The third Crown Commonwealth League of Rights conference was held in 1983 in Canada. The CLR supported a tour of Canada by David Irving in 1991.

== See also ==
- Australian League of Rights
- British League of Rights
- New Zealand League of Rights
