= New Zealand League of Rights =

The New Zealand League of Rights was the New Zealand offshoot of Eric Butler's Australian League of Rights.

Following speaking tours of New Zealand in the late 1960s, Eric Butler sought to establish a local version of his organisation. A New Zealand League of Rights was announced in 1970 but did not become operational until 1971. Its first director and co-founder was Sidney Wood. In 1979, David Thompson became its director and revitalised the organisation, publishing a New Zealand version of On Target. The League increased its membership during the 1980s. Thompson was succeeded in the mid-1980s by Bill Daly who ran the League till its end. The organisation ceased activity in 2004.

Like the parent organisation, the NZ League proclaimed its "loyalty to God, Queen and Country". Ciarán Ó Maoláin has stated the group adhered to an ideology of Social Credit and antisemitism, and was white supremacist. Another writer, Paul Spoonley, has suggested that the New Zealand League's antisemitism was not as explicit as that found in the Australian and Canadian branches.

The NZ League criticised the Social Credit Party for having strayed from the path indicated by C. H. Douglas and regarded itself as his true heir, but members maintained links with the party until the end of the 1970s, when the party indicated League members were no longer welcome. League members would then turn towards the National Party. League members were also active in other groups such as the Voters' Association.

== See also ==
- Australian League of Rights
- British League of Rights
- Canadian League of Rights
