= Derek Turner (journalist) =

English freelance journalist (born 1964)

- Born: December 1964 (age 61); Dublin, Ireland
- Occupations: Writer, journalist
- Website: derek-turner.com

Derek Turner (born 1964) is an English journalist and author of several novels.

== Early life ==
Turner is the son of a ship’s captain of Methodist background and a Church of Ireland mother (the great niece of the Archbishop of Dublin). Before he became a journalist, he worked as a sailor, security guard, builder, advertising salesman for The Daily Telegraph, and production editor for a technical publishing firm.

== Journalism ==
Turner's work has appeared in a large number of magazines and newspapers, including The Times, The Sunday Telegraph, Literary Review, The Salisbury Review, Taki's Magazine, The Economist, European Journal, The Lady, and Kent Life. His articles have appeared in the American magazines Chronicles and the Connor Post, the German publication Criticón, and other journals in Australia, France, Italy, the Czech Republic and elsewhere. In 2010, he was a contributing editor of AlternativeRight.com, the website owned by Richard B. Spencer.

He was editor of the conservative magazine Right Now!, published by Taki Theodoracopulos in the 1990s. He edited the briefly revived Quarterly Review from 2007 to 2011.

His areas of focus are English letters, British topography, European culture and history, folklore, and current affairs.

== Novels ==
Turner is the author of three novels: Sea Changes, A Modern Journey, and Displacement. In 2022 he wrote Edge of England: Landfall in Lincolnshire, a history and appreciation of Lincolnshire.

== Published works ==
- Sea Changes (WSP, 2012) ISBN 9781593680022
- Displacement (Endeavour Press, 2015) ISBN 9781530119219
- A Modern Journey (Endeavour Press, 2016) ISBN 9781523676217
- Edge of England: Landfall in Lincolnshire (Hurst, 2022) ISBN 9781787386983
