= Cornerstone Group =

Political organisation within the Conservative Party

- President: Sir Edward Leigh
- Chairman: Sir John Hayes
- Founded: 2005; 20 years ago
- Headquarters: United Kingdom
- Ideology: High Toryism
- Political position: Right-wing
- Party: Conservative Party
- Slogan: Faith, Flag and Family
- House of Commons (Conservative seats (2019): 32 / 365

Website
- cornerstonegroup.wordpress.com (Inactive)

The Cornerstone Group is a High Tory or traditional conservative political organisation within the British Conservative Party. It comprises Members of Parliament with a traditionalist outlook and was founded in 2005. The Group's president is Edward Leigh and its chairman John Hayes. Many Conservative Party Members of Parliament and Peers belong to the Cornerstone Group, including several members of the Shadow Cabinet.

The Conservative Party incorporates three main schools of thought; along with the traditionalist-leaning Cornerstone Group, there are also the One Nation and Thatcherite elements. There is more than a degree of overlap between these groups, depending on the issue. The Cornerstone Group supports the unitary governance of the British state and opposes attempts to transfer power away from it — either downwards through regionalism and devolution, or upwards to the international control of the European Union. A manifesto released at the time of its foundation set out the Group's intentions:

We believe that these values must be stressed: tradition; nation; family; religious ethics; free enterprise. We want to use the leadership election to argue for principles and policies, not about personalities. We must seize the centre ground and pull it kicking and screaming towards us. That is the only way to demolish the foundations of the liberal establishment and demonstrate to the electorate the fundamental flaws on which it is based.

— Strange Desertion of Tory England: The Conservative Alternative to the Liberal Orthodoxy, July 2005

The Cornerstone Group appeared to be inactive after the 2019 elections (the source of the Cornerstone "About" page shows a last modified date in 2018); Sir John Hayes's Common Sense Group, launched in 2020 in the wake of Black Lives Matter with about 40 MPs, is said to revive the Cornerstone Group.

== Principles ==
Its name derives from the Cornerstone Group's support for three British social institutions: the Church of England, the unitary British state, and the family. To this end, it emphasises England's Anglican heritage, opposes any transfer of power away from the central government and institutions of the United Kingdom — either downwards to the nations and regions or upwards to the European Union — and seeks to place greater emphasis on traditional family structures to repair what has been termed as Britain's broken society, as well as calling for lower levels of immigration into the UK.

Its core focus points according to its website include the "monarchy; traditional marriage; family and community duties; proper pride in the United Kingdom's distinctive qualities; quality of life over soulless utility; social responsibility over personal selfishness; social justice as civic duty, not state dependency; compassion for those in need; reducing government waste; lower taxation and deregulation; and promotion and protection of ancient liberties against politically correct censorship and a commitment to the democratically elected UK parliament."

A prominent MP from this wing of the party is John Redwood. Though the group is marked out by its support for the Anglican Church, it also includes more traditional Catholic members such as Jacob Rees-Mogg and Edward Leigh.

== Members ==
MPs, but not peers, listed on the Cornerstone Web site as members as of 20 June 2018.

Member	Constituency	Elected
Edward Leigh	Gainsborough	1983
Bill Cash	Stone	1984
John Redwood	Wokingham	1987
John Whittingdale	Maldon	1992
John Hayes	South Holland and the Deepings	1997
Christopher Chope	Christchurch	1997 (prev. 1983)
Laurence Robertson	Tewkesbury	1997
Ian Liddell-Grainger	Bridgwater and West Somerset	2001
Greg Knight	East Yorkshire	2001 (prev. 1983)
Andrew Rosindell	Romford	2001
Peter Bone	Wellingborough	2005
Stephen Crabb	Preseli Pembrokeshire	2005
David T C Davies	Monmouth	2005
Philip Davies	Shipley	2005
Robert Goodwill	Scarborough and Whitby	2005
Greg Hands	Chelsea and Fulham	2005
Philip Hollobone	Kettering	2005
Adam Holloway	Gravesham	2005
David Jones	Clwyd West	2005
Daniel Kawczynski	Shrewsbury and Atcham	2005
Charles Walker	Broxbourne	2005
Nigel Adams	Selby and Ainsty	2010
Steve Baker	Wycombe	2010
Fiona Bruce	Congleton	2010
Robert Halfon	Harlow	2010
Sajid Javid	Bromsgrove	2010
Kwasi Kwarteng	Spelthorne	2010
Jacob Rees-Mogg	North East Somerset	2010
Priti Patel	Witham	2010
Martin Vickers	Cleethorpes	2010

== See also ==
- Bow Group
- Traditional Britain Group
- Conservative Christian Fellowship
