= British League of Rights =

British far-right political organisation

- Formation: 1971
- Type: Anti-communism; Antisemitism; Anti-liberalism; Christian right White nationalism Euroscepticism

The British League of Rights was an offshoot of the Australian League of Rights founded in 1971. It was an "anti-semitic and white supremacist" political group. The British League opposed the entry of the UK into the European Economic Community.

In the early 1970s, it came under the direction of Don Martin, a former member of the Australian Young Liberals, who has run it ever since. Under Martin's direction the British League increased its membership. Conservative Monday Club member Lady Jane Birdwood was General Secretary. By 1974, the British League of Rights became the British chapter of the World Anti-Communist League, replacing Geoffrey Stewart-Smith's Foreign Affairs Circle, which claimed to have left due to the Anti-Communist League's antisemitism. In 1975, the British League established an association with the Britons Publishing Company. Although not officially connected, the League of Rights had links to the National Front and during the leadership of John Tyndall articles that appeared in League of Rights publications were regularly reprinted in Tyndall's organ Spearhead.

The British League of Rights hosted the fourth Crown Commonwealth League of Rights conference in 1985.

Don Martin elected to resign from the chairmanship of the Policy Unit of the Federation of Small Businesses in 2001 as a result of a campaign by Gerry Gable's Searchlight magazine.

== See also ==
- Australian League of Rights
- Canadian League of Rights
- New Zealand League of Rights
