= Michael Keith Smith =

Michael Keith Smith (1953 – 3 July 2010) was the founder-chairman of the Conservative Democratic Alliance, a British right-wing pressure group. He was also the successful claimant in Keith-Smith v Williams, a landmark English libel case in 2006 that confirmed that existing libel laws applied to internet discussion. Smith died after jumping from the keep at Portchester Castle on 3 July 2010.

== Early politics ==
Mike Smith was a Chartered Surveyor. A member of the Conservative Party since 1970, he was Chairman of the Portsmouth South Young Conservatives 1972–76 and vice-chairman and Vice-President of the Wessex Young Conservatives between 1976–82; in 1984 he was elected President of the Portsmouth South Young Conservatives, and in the same year he stood for Portsmouth City Council. From 1985 to 1988 he was Vice-Chairman of Portsmouth South Conservative Association and in 1987 he was Deputy chairman. He gained the Conservative National Union (Wessex) Public Speaking Award for 1991.

== Monday Club ==
He joined the Conservative Monday Club in 1971. He was a member of its Hampshire branch before 1974, sometime its vice-chairman and he was elected chairman in July 1987. He was co-opted onto the Club's National Executive Council in 1984, where he remained until 1993. When Mark Mayall stood down as chairman at the Annual General Meeting in 1994, Smith unsuccessfully stood for election to that post, losing to Lord Sudeley. In 1995 he stood as National Club Political Meetings Secretary, again unsuccessfully. He was subsequently involved in "Tories Against Sleaze".

In 2001, the Monday Club's links with the Conservative Party were suspended because of the former's anti-immigration policies. After attempts by the Monday Club hierarchy to re-establish links with the Conservative Party, Smith proposed three motions at the Club's Annual General meeting in April 2002: reaffirming its opposition to mass immigration; empowering Club officers to institute legal action against the Conservative Party; and calling for the sacking of former Monday Club member John Bercow, then Shadow Chief Secretary to the Treasury, for "hypocrisy". The first two motions were passed, with the one on Bercow being narrowly defeated.

== Conservative Democratic Alliance ==
In response to the Conservative Party's treatment of the Monday Club and the Club's lack of will to fight it, Smith founded, in 2001, the Conservative Democratic Alliance (CDA), a new traditional Tory pressure-group which immediately targeted Oliver Letwin's seat, distributing leaflets saying that he was not a real Tory. In 2002, Iain Duncan Smith expelled Smith from the Conservative Party for threatening to stand candidates against Conservatives. Smith responded with a High Court writ, and Duncan Smith was forced to reinstate Smith's party membership. Duncan Smith then reportedly said that he had "plans to make the Conservative Democratic Alliance a proscribed organisation, which would ban party members from belonging to it." In the event, no such action was taken.

Smith later left the Conservative Party and stood as a parliamentary candidate for the United Kingdom Independence Party in Portsmouth North in 2005. Despite almost tripling the UKIP vote - which was widely attributed as having helped Labour to retain the seat against an insurgent Conservative vote - Smith came last of the four candidates and lost his deposit, having attained 3.6% of the vote.

== Suicide ==
Smith had suffered from depression and mental health issues caused by the onset of Type 2 diabetes. He was admitted to a psychiatric unit after stabbing himself on 24 June 2010 and killed himself by jumping from the keep of Portchester Castle, with the Assistant Coroner reaching a verdict of suicide.
