= Keith-Smith v Williams =

2006 English libel case

- Court: High Court of Justice
- Decided: 21 March 2006
- Citation: [2006] EWHC 860 (QB)

Court membership
- Judge sitting: Macduff J

Keith-Smith v Williams is a 2006 English libel case that confirmed that existing libel laws applied to internet discussion.

It was important because it was seen as the first UK internet libel case that represented two individuals rather than one party being an Internet service provider, and was the first British case involving a successful prosecution of an individual poster within a chat room. The Manchester Evening News claimed that this contradicted a common assumption among bloggers that it was the publisher and not the writer who was responsible for any libel claims that they may generate.

Mark Stephens, the head of media law at Stephens Finer Innocent, characterised the case as "a dark day for freedom of speech with broad implications", which was denied by the plaintiff Michael Keith Smith.

The case involved unemployed ex-teacher Tracy Williams falsely accusing a former UKIP candidate, Michael Keith Smith, of being a sexual offender and racist bigot. Williams had posted as Gosforth.

The court ordered her to pay £10,000 plus costs. Although the accusations were made in a Yahoo discussion group with about 100 members, damages were awarded as the remarks were available throughout the world.
