= Arline Usden =

British journalist (1937–2013)

- Editor of The Lady
- Born: 14 October 1937; Crumpsall
- Died: 3 August 2013 (aged 75); London

Arline Usden (14 October 1937 – 3 August 2013) was a British journalist. She rose to be editor of The Lady.

== Life ==
Usden was born in Crumpsall in Manchester in 1937. She learnt to type when she left the Manchester High School for Girls when she was 16. She worked as reporter on newspapers in the north of England until she moved to London in 1960.

In 1991 she became the editor of The Lady magazine. This was an important magazine that had been published since 1885 and it was known as a place where people could advertise for domestic staff - in fact the adverts appeared at the start of the magazine. The Lady was owned by the Bowles family and Thomas Bowles ran it and lived at their offices. Usden gradually introduced change but Thomas Bowles resisted.

In November 2008, Bowles' great-grandson, Ben Budworth, became the publisher of The Lady on behalf of the family owners. He introduced many changes proposed by Usden and circulation increased from 27,000 to 57,000 after a relaunch in 2009. Budworth later appointed Rachel Johnson as the magazine's ninth editor in September 2009 she took over from Usden who became an editor at large. A Channel 4 TV programme, The Lady and the Revamp followed Johnson in her quest to raise circulation further.

Usden died in London in 2013.
