= Gluck frame =

Picture frame invented in 1932

The Gluck frame is a type of picture frame invented by the painter Gluck (Note: Sources generally use she/her pronouns to refer to Gluck, but this article avoids the use of pronouns to refer to Gluck to match the convention used at the artist's article.) in 1932. It debuted the same year at the artist's third exhibition at the London Fine Art Society.

== Construction ==
The Gluck frame is a geometric three-tier stepped frame, with the steps rising from the exterior of the frame towards the interior. The frame was designed to contrast a typical frame, which rises from the interior to the exterior. The intent of the inventor was that the frame could be painted or wallpapered to be the same material as the wall upon which the painting was hung, causing the painting to appear to be part of the wall. The first Gluck frames were constructed out of soft plasticine, although later frames were constructed out of wood.

== Background ==
Gluck had the opinion that gilt carved frames were not appropriate for a modern setting and that modern frames were unsatisfactory and that they excessively limited artists. Like other modernists, Gluck considered paintings and other artistic displays to be a part of the architectural style of the room which required appropriate artistic considerations. The Gluck frame was created specifically for the 1932 exhibition out of a frustration of the limitations of contemporary frames. Gluck was not the first artist to develop a new variety of picture frame (James McNeill Whistler, for example, developed his own picture frames in the 19th century), but Gluck was notable for actively promoting the frame and calling it a "Gluck frame".

In private correspondence, Gluck described why the new frame was developed:

One day feeling quite despairing, I took a lump of plasticine and started to make something very simple which, if possible, could be part of any wall on which it might be placed, and in doing this I suddenly realised that what has become the Gluck frame was the only solution.

— Gluck, private correspondence (n.d.)

== Use and legacy ==
Gluck's newly designed frames debuted in 1932 at the artist's second exhibition at the London Fine Art Society. The main exhibition hall of the Fine Art Society, the "Gluck Room", was painted completely white with panelled bays and pilasters having steps that matched the frames. Gluck designed the exhibition with and intent to maximize the use of the newly invented frame, to match the frames, dictating the particular locations of the panelling, the paint color used for the walls, and the locations of each painting.

The Gluck frame received high praise at its debut, contributing to the exhibition being extended by a month. Contemporary reviews called the Gluck frame "fashionable", describing the use of the frames as ideal for displaying artwork within a modern home. The Fine Art Society later reused the Gluck room to display etchings by Albrecht Dürer and Rembrandt, with Gluck fabricating new grey frames for the display. Gluck was frequently commissioned for new flower paintings in Gluck frames for several years. After some time, Gluck became concerned that similar frame designs were plagiarized, and the frame was patented in the United Kingdom in 1933. Some patent infringement had occurred: the original Gluck frames were reused by the exhibition's curator without permission from Gluck, although Gluck was reportedly flattered and no legal action was taken by the artist.

Gluck used the Gluck frame for all subsequent works, and wanted the Gluck frame to remembered as part of a larger artistic legacy. Following the frame's debut, contemporary critics praised the frame as more harmonious with a home than a gilt frame; the Gluck frame better incorporated the enclosed painting with the architecture of the room. The manufacturability and affordabiltiy of the frame was also praised as the frame would not be required to be a skilled engraver or gilder. The frame is still well regarded by modern art critics. It has been described as "ensur[ing] harmony between art and setting" and "allow[ing] image to disperse and communicate its affect in new and transgressive ways".
