= Nesta Obermer =

British philanthropist, writer and artist

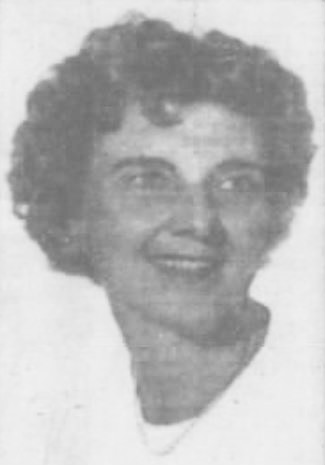
- Obermer, 1952
- Born: Ella Ernestine Sawyer; 14 September 1893; Cromer, Norfolk, England
- Died: 3 October 1984 (aged 91); Paudex, Canton of Vaud, Switzerland
- Other names: Ella Ernestine Obermer, Ella Sawyer Obermer, Nesta Sawyer
- Occupations: philanthropist, playwright, artist
- Years active: 1921–1978

Nesta Obermer OBE, (née Sawyer; 14 September 1893 – 3 October 1984), was a British philanthropist, playwright and artist. Born in Norfolk, she began writing as a child when illness forced her to be confined for a lengthy period. Travelling often, as a diplomat's daughter she began writing articles as a war correspondent during World War I. She married wealthy playwright Seymour Obermer, 30 years her senior, in 1925. As participants in an international social circle, the two travelled widely. Encouraged by her husband, Obermer wrote three plays which were produced in the 1930s in London theatres and was a well known reader on BBC Radio until the 1940s.

Between 1936 and 1944, Obermer was symbolically, but not legally, married to painter Gluck, who called Obermer both their wife and a muse. When World War II ended, Obermer and her husband moved to Hawaii, living in Honolulu for the next 20 years. She had long contributed to good causes, often those with educational aims, and continued this work there. She became a painter and participated in both solo and group showings, often using them as fund raisers for charitable causes. In 1969, Obermer moved to Paudex, Switzerland, where she remained until her death in 1984. She was honoured as an officer of the Order of the British Empire and received the Distinguished Women Award from Northwood University for her philanthropy and stature as a role model. The University of Hawaii awards a music scholarship in her name.

== Early life ==
Ella Ernestine Sawyer was born on 14 September 1893 at Cromer Hall, Norfolk, England to Ethel Maria (née Hulley) and Ernest Edward Sawyer. While young, she was given the nickname Nesta. A sickly child, she suffered from peritonitis caused by tuberculosis, which required hospitalization for a year. While confined, she began writing The Reason of the Beginning and other Imaginings, which was published in 1921. Her father, a career diplomat, was posted to Bern and the family moved to Switzerland during World War I. She wrote articles as a war correspondent from the age of 17 and had an article The Taking of Strasbourg published in The Times. She acted in amateur theatrical productions in the 1920s, and met her future husband through theatrical circles. On 23 April 1925, at St James' Church Sussex Gardens, she married Seymour Obermer, an American playwright living in England.

== Career ==
Continuing to use her maiden name for the next decade, Sawyer was a society figure known for her charm and style. Together with her husband, who was 30 years older, she led an international existence. The couple lived variously in their home in the English countryside, their flat in London, or their villa at Grasse on the French Riviera. They wintered in Switzerland to take advantage of the sporting events and spent their summers in Venice. Sawyer once claimed that after her marriage she and her husband rarely stayed "more than three nights in any one place". She was known for her daring, obtaining a pilot's licence against her husband's wishes, and later learning to surf. She also earned competitive gold medals for speed skating and skiing. In 1932, at a dinner party given by Molly, Lady Mount Temple, she met the artist Gluck.

With her husband's encouragement, Sawyer began writing plays. Her first production, Black Magic, opened at the Royalty Theatre in London in 1931. It was staged in 1935 by the Theatre Guild in New York City and adapted for television, airing in 1938. Her second play So Good, So Kind was presented in 1933 at the Playhouse Theatre, as was Little White Lies, which opened the autumn season. She also read dramas, poems, and comedies on BBC Radio throughout the 1930s and 1940s. During this same period, Sawyer's relationship with Gluck intensified. On 25 May 1936, Gluck confided in their diary that the two were married, had exchanged rings, and the date became their anniversary. Their affair lasted until 1944 and was marked by the creation of Medallion, which Gluck called the YouWe Picture - a dual portrait of Gluck and Sawyer inspired by their 1936 attendance of Fritz Busch's production of Mozart's opera Don Giovanni. Gluck acknowledged Sawyer as their one great love and inspiration, saving the letters written between them in a shoebox only discovered after Gluck's death.

The Obermers were involved in many charitable works and organized events to benefit the Heritage Craft Schools for Crippled Children. Both of them served on the board of trustees and used connections with influential friends to help with fund raising. She also provided financial support to the Yehudi Menuhin School, the Royal Society for the Prevention of Cruelty to Animals, Amnesty International, and other educational programmes. During the war, she served on the Plumpton Civil Defence transporting the wounded to nearby hospitals. She made recordings to allow visually impaired people to listen to the world's great literary works. After the war, for her war-time broadcasts she was honoured as an officer of the Order of the British Empire.

In the same period, Obermer's father died and her mother became depressed. To lift her spirits, Obermer asked her mother, who had been a talented watercolourist, to give her painting lessons. Though her mother did not rejuvenate her interest in art, Obermer began oil painting. In 1948, the couple moved to Hawaii, as Obermer's husband had suffered a stroke and he thought the climate might improve his condition. For six years they lived at the Royal Hawaiian Hotel and along with the expatriate community made numerous trips to Asia and the Pacific Islands. Obermer continued her philanthropic work, hosting art shows and auctions to fund programmes like the Kuakini Medical Center, Palama Settlement House, and organizations benefiting those with visual impairments. Her works included portraits, which were praised for capturing the characteristics of her subjects, and landscapes of tropical settings, in Hawaii and from her travels to Bali, Fiji, Tahiti, and other places.

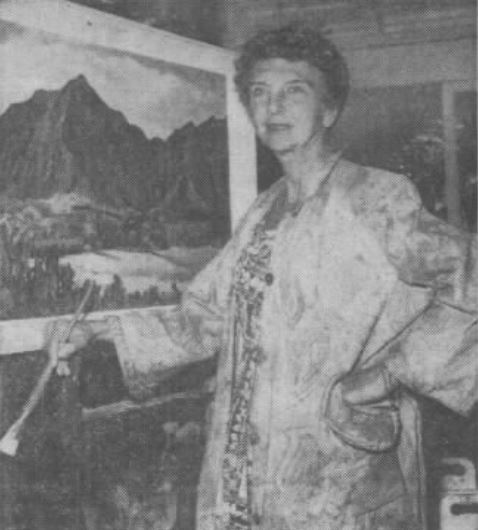
Obermer at her easel, 1957

In 1954, the couple purchased a home on Diamond Head. Obermer continued to make a name for herself as a painter, exhibiting in both solo showings and with groups of other artists. In 1957, her play Mind Over Matter, a rewrite of Black Magic, was produced on Broadway. That year, Seymour died and she inherited his estate, valued at $668,240 (equivalent to $7,700,000 in 2025). The Internal Revenue Service taxed her over $46,000 (equivalent to $500,000 in 2025) in inheritance tax, which she claimed was an overpayment of nearly $25,000 (equivalent to $300,000 in 2025). Obermer appealed and eventually won a reduction in the tax claim in 1964. That year, an anonymous donor established the Nesta Obermer Chamber Music Scholarship at the University of Hawaii to honour Obermer's long involvement in promoting the arts.

In 1969, Obermer moved to Switzerland, settling in Le Tourbillon, a luxury estate in the Canton of Vaud. She continued her social lifestyle, entertaining such notables as Joyce Carey, Diana Menuhin, Graham Payn, Ginette Spanier, Joan Sutherland, as well as Gluck and Gluck's new partner Edith Shackleton Heald. In 1972, Obermer helped Gluck mount what would be Gluck's last solo exhibition, inviting her personal contacts to ensure its success. In 1978, she was honoured by Northwood University in Midland, Michigan with their Distinguished Women Award for her philanthropy and stature as a role model for women.

== Death and legacy ==
Obermer died on 3 October 1984 in Paudex, (near Lausanne) in Vaud, Switzerland. The scholarship fund established in her name is still granted by the University of Hawaii. In 2017, the Brighton Museum & Art Gallery hosted an exhibit of Gluck's paintings and personal effects, which included some of the letters and paintings featuring Obermer, such as The Punt (1937). Medallion is considered a seminal work and "one of the most famous paintings" in the depiction of LGBTQ relationships, according to Gluck's biographers, Amy De La Haye and Martin Pel.
