= Jonathan Bowden =

English political activist (1962–2012)

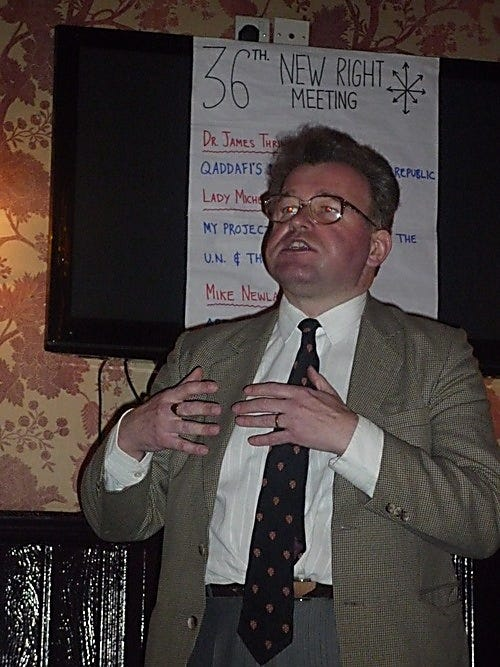
- Bowden speaking in December 2011. The topic was Yukio Mishima.
- Born: Jonathan David Anthony Bowden; 12 April 1962; Royal Tunbridge Wells, Kent, England
- Died: 29 March 2012 (aged 49); Tadley, Hampshire, England
- Occupations: Political activist; orator; writer; artist
- Political party: Conservative (until 1992); Freedom Party (2001–2003); British National Party (2003–2007)
- Other political affiliations: Monday Club (1990–1992); Revolutionary Conservative Caucus (1992–1994); New Right (from 2005)

Jonathan David Anthony Bowden (12 April 1962 – 29 March 2012) was an English right-wing political activist, orator, writer and artist. A member of the Conservative Party in the early 1990s, he later became involved in a number of far-right organisations, including the British National Party (BNP). A relatively obscure speaker during his lifetime, Bowden has since been described as a "cult figure" amongst the far-right movements, even more than a decade after his death.

== Life and career ==
=== Early life and education ===
Bowden was born in Royal Tunbridge Wells in Kent, and attended Presentation College, a Roman Catholic boy's school, in Reading, Berkshire. He was an only child. His father was a bank manager whilst his mother, Dorothy, suffered from severe mental illness and died when Bowden was a teenager.

In 1984 he completed one year of a Bachelor of Arts history degree course at Birkbeck, University of London, as a mature student, but left without graduating. He enrolled at Wolfson College, Cambridge, in 1988, but left after a few months. He became a lifelong friend of the novelist Bill Hopkins (1928–2011), one of the angry young men, during this time. Bowden was otherwise an autodidact.

=== Conservative Party (until 1992) ===
Bowden began his career as a member of the Conservative Party in the parliamentary constituency of Bethnal Green and Stepney and joined the Federation of Conservative Students. In 1990 he joined the Monday Club, a pressure group on the fringes of the party, and the following year made an unsuccessful bid to be elected onto the club's Executive Council. In 1991 he was appointed co-chairman, with Stuart Millson, of the club's media committee, and was also active in the Western Goals Institute. In 1992 Bowden was expelled from the Monday Club. (The Conservative Party disassociated itself from the Monday Club in 2001, and the club disbanded in 2024.)

=== Revolutionary Conservative Caucus (1992–1994) ===
Bowden and Millson co-founded the Revolutionary Conservative Caucus in November 1992 with the aim of introducing "abstract thought into the nether reaches of the Conservative and Unionist party". It published a quarterly journal entitled The Revolutionary Conservative Review. By the end of 1994 Millson and Bowden parted company and the group dissolved.

In 1993 Bowden published Right through the European Books Society. He was also reported to be a prominent figure in the creative milieu responsible for the emergence of the political magazine Right Now!.

=== Freedom Party (2001–2003) ===
Bowden then joined the Freedom Party in 2001; he was its treasurer for a short time, and subsequently was a member of the Bloomsbury Forum, alongside Adrian Davies.

=== British National Party (2003–2007) ===
In 2003 Bowden left the Freedom Party and joined the BNP. He was appointed Cultural Officer, a position that was created by Nick Griffin, the party's then-leader, to give Bowden an official role. In July 2007 Bowden resigned both his position and his membership after a dispute between him, Griffin and other individuals within the party – Bowden had supported Chris Jackson in his failed leadership bid against Griffin. In his resignation statement addressing the party's internal fighting, Bowden wrote, "I am sick and tired of the human scum and vermin which proliferate in such shallow waters". Although he still gave speeches throughout England and Wales at local meetings for the BNP, he never rejoined the party and cut all ties after the 2010 general election.

Many of his speeches were recorded and have been transcribed. Topics of his lectures included philosophers, politicians and historical literary figures who were prominent in the far-right. In late 2011 and early 2012 Bowden made 14 appearances on the American White supremacist Richard B. Spencer's Vanguard podcast.

=== New Right Committee (from 2005) ===
New Right Committee
- Formation: 16 January 2005
- Founders: Troy Southgate; Jonathan Bowden; Jonothon Boulter
- Legal status: Defunct
- Website: new-right.org (archive)

The New Right Committee, or simply "New Right", was a pan-European nationalist and far-right think tank founded by Bowden and the activist Troy Southgate with Jonothon Boulter. The name was a reference to the French Nouvelle Droite and the group was otherwise unrelated to the wider British and American usage of the term "New Right".

In March 2005 the group described itself on its Yahoo! Groups webpage: "We are opposed to liberalism, democracy and egalitarianism and fight to restore the eternal values and principles that have become submerged beneath the corrosive tsunami of the modern world."

In June 2005 New Right announced that it would publish New Imperium, a quarterly magazine it described as an "intellectual journal". Bowden was the organisation's press officer.

=== Death ===
On 29 March 2012 Bowden died of a heart attack at his home in Tadley, Hampshire, 14 days before his 50th birthday. In 2011 he had been released from the psychiatric ward of a hospital, to which he was involuntarily committed earlier that year after suffering a mental breakdown.

== Views ==
Bowden believed that hierarchies are good for society, that "liberalism is moral syphilis" and that native Europeans are justified in asserting their cultural, ethnic, psychological and spiritual hegemony over Europe. He was influenced by a range of philosophers and writers, including Friedrich Nietzsche, Julius Evola and Wyndham Lewis.

Bowden expressed pagan religious beliefs and rejected Christian ethics, believing they exalt weakness and have contributed to the decline of Western society.

== Bibliography ==
=== Works ===
- Mad (London: Avant-Garde Publishing, 1989); (Nine-Banded Books, 2009) ISBN 978-0578006406
- Sade (London: Egotist, 1992); (Nine-Banded Books, 2013) ISBN 978-0989697217
- Aryan (London: Egotist Press, 1992); (Nine-Banded Books, 2020) ISBN 978-1735643816
- Brute (London: Egotist Press, 1992) ISBN 978-1872181059
- Skin (London: Egotist Press, 1992) ISBN 978-1872181066
- Axe (London: Egotist, 1993); (London: The Palingenesis Project, 2014). ISBN 978-1909606074
- Craze (London: Egotist Press, 1993) ISBN 1-872181-17-1
- Right (London: European Books Society 1994); (London: The Palingenesis Project, 2016) ISBN 978-1909606159
- Standardbearers – British Roots of the New Right, edited by Adrian Davies, Eddy Butler & Jonathan Bowden; Beckenham, Kent, 180pps, (April 1999) ISBN 978-0953730902
- Apocalypse TV (London: The Spinning Top Club, 2007). ISBN 978-0-9557402-0-6
- The Art of Jonathan Bowden (1974–2007) (London: The Spinning Top Club, 2007). ISBN 978-0-9557402-2-0
- The Fanatical Pursuit of Purity (London: The Spinning Top Club, 2008). ISBN 978-0-9557402-3-7
- Al-Qa’eda Moth (London: The Spinning Top Club, 2008). ISBN 978-0-9557402-5-1
- Kratos (London: The Spinning Top Club, 2008). ISBN 978-0-9557402-1-3
- A Ballet of Wasps (London: The Spinning Top Club, 2008). ISBN 978-0-9557402-6-8
- Goodbye Homunculus! (London: The Spinning Top Club, 2009). ISBN 978-0-9557402-9-9
- The Art of Jonathan Bowden, Vol. 2 (1968–1974) (London: The Spinning Top Club, 2009). ISBN 978-0-9557402-4-4
- Lilith Before Eve (London: The Spinning Top Club, 2009). ISBN 978-0-9557402-8-2
- Louisiana Half-Face (London: The Spinning Top Club, 2010). ISBN 978-0-9565120-2-4
- The Art of Jonathan Bowden, Vol. 3 (1967–1974) (London: The Spinning Top Club, 2010). ISBN 978-0-9565120-1-7
- Our Name Is Legion (London: The Spinning Top Club, 2011). ISBN 978-0-9565120-3-1
- Colonel Sodom Goes to Gomorrah (London: The Spinning Top Club, 2011). ISBN 978-0-9565120-4-8
- Locusts Devour a Carcass (London: The Spinning Top Club, 2012). ISBN 978-0-9565120-5-5
- Spiders Are Not Insects (London: The Spinning Top Club, 2012). ISBN 978-0-9565120-6-2
- The Speeches (London: Black Front Press, 2012). ISBN 978-0957324510
- Pulp Fascism (San Francisco: Counter-Currents, 2013). ISBN 978-1935965640
- Western Civilization Bites Back (San Francisco: Counter-Currents, 2014). ISBN 978-1935965770
- Demon (London: The Palingenesis Project, 2014). ISBN 978-1909606043
- Blood (London: The Palingenesis Project, 2016). ISBN 978-1909606098
- Heat (London: The Palingenesis Project, 2017). ISBN 978-1909606197
- Deathlock (London: The Palingenesis Project, 2017). ISBN 978-1909606210
- Extremists: Studies in Metapolitics (San Francisco: Counter-Currents, 2017). ISBN 978-1940933481
- Why I Am Not a Liberal (Imperium Press, 2020). ISBN 978-0648859307
- Reactionary Modernism (San Francisco: Counter-Currents, 2022). ISBN 978-1642641677
- The Cultured Thug (San Francisco: Counter-Currents, 2023). ISBN 978-1642640113

== Filmography ==
Bowden served as the producer and writer of multiple low-budget short films and documentaries, for which he provided acting and narration.

Year	Title	Starring	Credits
2001 (production) 2005 (release)	Venus Flytrap	Jonathan Bowden, Lisa Garner, Nicola Henry, Jane Robinson, Katie Willow, Nicole Wiseman and Claudia Minne Boyle	Directed by Andrea Lioy Produced by Jonathan Bowden Screenplay by Jonathan Bowden and Andrea Lioy
2007 (production/release)	Fenris Devours Odin		Written and narrated by Jonathan Bowden
2006 (production) 2009 (release)	Grand Guignol	Jonathan Bowden, Nicola Henry, Katie Willow, Michael Woodbridge and Lucy Zara	Directed by Andrea Lioy Produced by Jonathan Bowden Screenplay by Jonathan Bowden and Andrea Lioy Based upon the play by Jonathan Bowden
