= Heath Caper =

The Heath Caper was an alleged plot by the KGB and the Czechoslovak secret service (StB) to gain blackmail leverage over British Conservative politician Edward Heath.

Josef Frolik, published details of the alleged plot in his memoirs in 1975.

In 2012 the BBC interviewed Jan Mrazek, the supposed StB handler, who denied any involvement. The archives did not contradict him, however they did disagree with some of his general claims.

Jan Mrazek claimed were made that George Kennedy Young, a former member of MI6, and on the opposite wing of the Conservative Party had initiated the story as a smear.
