= Edith Gostick =

Canadian politician

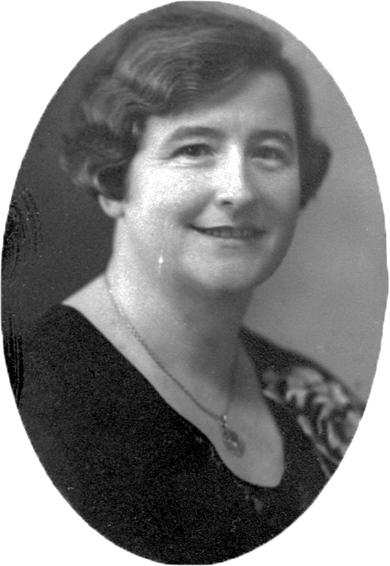

MLA for Calgary
- In office 1935–1940
- Preceded by: Hugh Farthing; William Ross; Fred White; Norman Hindsley
- Succeeded by: James Mahaffy; William Aberhart; Andrew Davison

Personal details
- Born: January 15, 1894 Porth, South Wales
- Died: July 8, 1984 (aged 90) Saanichton, British Columbia
- Party: Social Credit

Edith Hannah Gostick (née Thomas; January 15, 1894 – July 8, 1984) was a provincial level politician from Alberta, Canada. She served as a member of the Legislative Assembly of Alberta as a representative from the electoral district of Calgary from 1935 to 1940.

== Early life ==
Gostick was born in Wales and worked in the London office of the Australian Pay Corps during the First World War. The family subsequently settled in Alberta and established a homestead near Stettler, Alberta, before moving to Calgary. Gostick worked as a cashier in a Calgary department store for four years before entering politics.

Gostick's husband had served overseas with the Canadian Engineers during the First World War. By 1935, his health had deteriorated, and Gostick was supporting him and their two sons through her employment at the department store. She became interested in social credit around 1933 after learning about the economic proposals promoted by William Aberhart. She subsequently became active in the movement, campaigning throughout Alberta before her election in 1935.

== Political career ==
Gostick was among the women who took prominent roles in the social credit movement before the 1935 Alberta general election. Social Credit organizations promoted economic security for women as part of their monetary reform proposals.

Gostick ran for a seat as a Social Credit League of Alberta candidate in the Alberta Legislature in the 1935 Alberta general election. She received 3,787 first-preference votes in Calgary, where six members were elected using the single transferable vote system. She was declared elected on the 18th vote count, taking the fourth seat in the Legislature. Gostick and Edith Rogers were the only female Social Credit candidates elected to the legislature in 1935. She was one of the Social Credit candidates elected as the party formed its first provincial government under William Aberhart.

She ran for re-election in the 1940 general election but was defeated. In the 1940 election, when Calgary elected five members, Gostick received 1,605 first-preference votes and was not re-elected.

== Later career ==
Following her defeat in the 1940 election, Gostick was appointed provincial librarian of Alberta, a position she held until her retirement on July 15, 1959. She also served as secretary of the Geographic Board of Alberta from its establishment in 1946 until her retirement. She was succeeded as provincial librarian by E. J. Holmgren.

== Family ==
Her son Ron Gostick was a well-known publisher of antisemitic and far-right literature.
