= Patricia Drennan =

British cartoonist and illustrator (1933–2021)

Patrica Drennan
- Born: Patricia Bell; 16 May 1933 Belfast, Northern Ireland
- Died: 21 February 2021 (aged 87)
- Spouse: Hayden Drennan

Patricia Drennan (16 May 1933 – 21 February 2021) was a British cartoonist and illustrator, best known for her series The Lady Laughs in the magazine The Lady. She was a member of the British Cartoonists' Association, accepting their accolade for oldest female cartoonist in 2018.

== Life ==
Patricia Sheila Catherine Bell was born in Belfast in 1933. Her mother was a member of a family orchestra that toured hotels, while her father was a caterer and trumpeter in the band. She attended the Methodist College Belfast, a grammar school, and went on to study painting at the Belfast School of Art. She also attended the Accademia di Belle Arti in Palermo, Italy, between 1957 and 1958.

She married Hayden Drennan in 1960, with whom she travelled to Malaysia where he established a teacher training college. On their return to the United Kingdom, they lived on the Isle of Wight. The Drennans had three children.

Encouraged by Hayden, she began to submit cartoons for publication. He died in 1996.

Patricia Drennan died of lung cancer on 21 February 2021.

== Career ==
After graduation, Drennan worked at a sweetshop in Notting Hill, London, while trying to establish herself as an artist. Realising that a career as a painter was difficult without financial support, she started to send cartoons to the print media. As the cartoon industry was dominated by men, she signed her works 'Pat Drennan' as urged by her agent. One of her first publications was with the Daily Mirror in 1978.

Her works appeared in The Sunday Times, Punch magazine, Evening Standard, and The Sun. Between 2000 and 2009, her series The Lady Laughs appeared in The Lady magazine.

From 1982 to 1992, Drennan had a commission to produce a series of quarter-page cartoons to advertise Fortnum & Mason in the Royal Academy of Art's magazine. These often featured Sir Joshua Reynolds, the academy's first president, in conversation with the department store's founders. She created sketches promoting the whisky Chivas Regal.

Drennan taught art at Belfast and London.

In 1988, she was awarded the first prize at Waddington's Cartoon Awards.

After her husband's death, she continued to publish her works, signing them only as Drennan.

== Selected publications ==
- Loudon, Anne (1987). Dear Sir Anthony: Unrequited Mail. Illustrated by Patricia Drennan. Hutchinson. ISBN 978-0091726621.
- Wilkerson, Joe; Hichens, Phoebe (1989). Marriage Round the Clock: 52 Ways to Stay Happily Married Even Tho' Your Husband's Retired. Illustrated by Patricia Drennan. Quiller. ISBN 978-1870948265.
