= Gluck (painter) =

British painter (1895–1978)

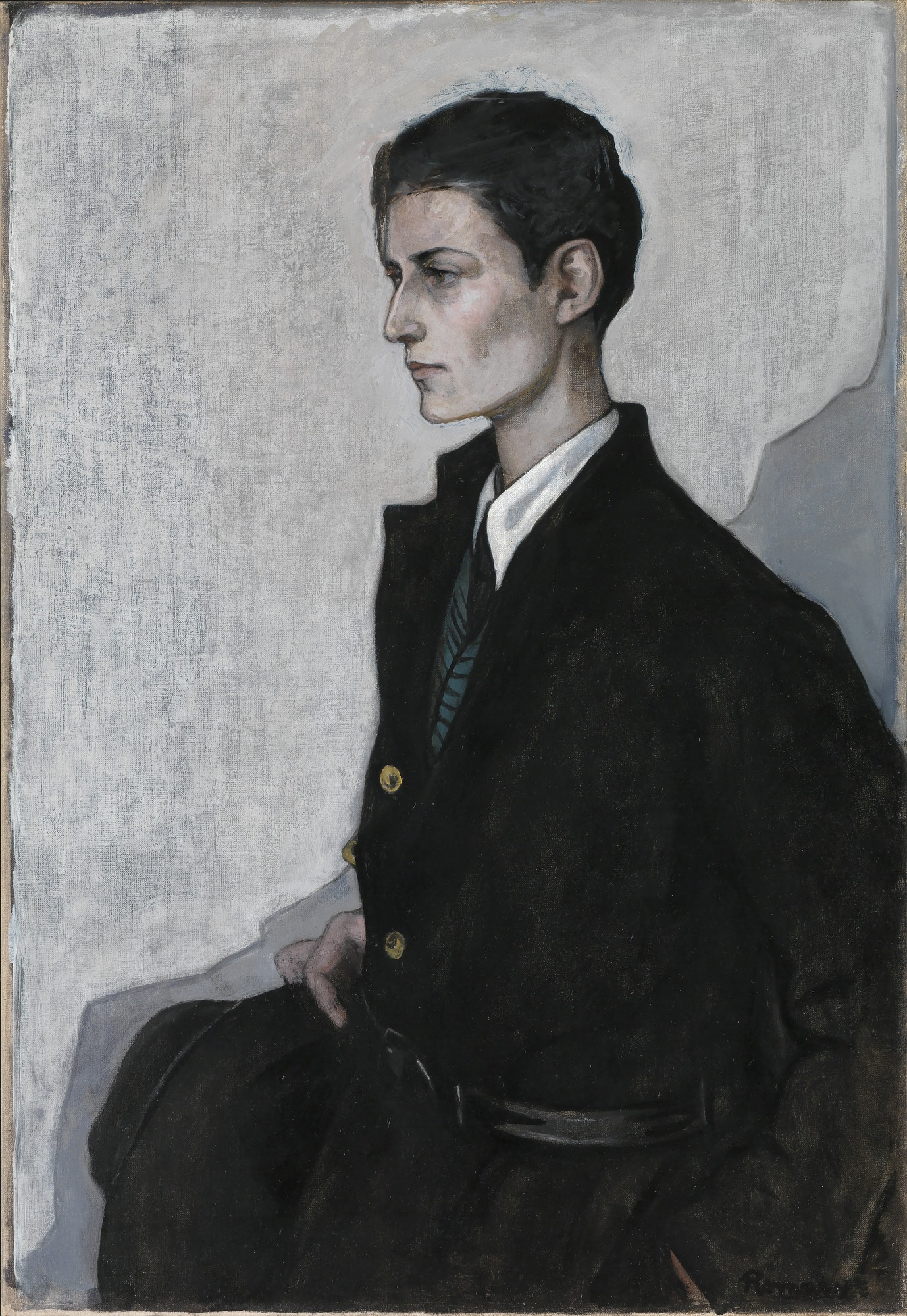
- Portrait titled Peter (A Young English Girl) by Romaine Brooks, 1923
- Born: Hannah Gluckstein; 13 August 1895; London, England
- Died: 10 January 1978 (aged 82); Steyning, Sussex, England
- Education: St Paul's Girls' School; St John's Wood School of Art
- Known for: Painting

Gluck (born Hannah Gluckstein; 13 August 1895 – 10 January 1978) was a British painter. Gluck joined the Lamorna artists' colony near Penzance, and was noted for creating portraits and floral paintings, as well as a new design of picture-frame. Gluck's relationships with a number of women included one with Nesta Obermer: the artist's joint self-portrait with Obermer (Medallion) is viewed as an iconic lesbian statement. Gluck rejected any forename or honorific (such as "Miss" or "Mr"), and also used the names Peter and Hig.

== Biography ==
=== Family and early life ===
Gluck was born into a wealthy Jewish family in London, England, to father Joseph Gluckstein, son of Samuel Gluckstein (1821–1873), the co-founder of Salmon & Gluckstein. Two of Gluck's uncles, Isidore and Montague Gluckstein, had founded J. Lyons and Co., a chain of high street tea rooms and a catering empire.

Gluck's American-born mother, Francesca Halle, was training to be an opera singer when she met her husband to be, a childless widower twice her age; they married six weeks after meeting. She was subject to what were then called nervous breakdowns, and in later life was confined to a mental asylum. Gluck's younger brother, Sir Louis Gluckstein, became a Conservative politician and barrister.

Gluck was a pupil at the Dame School in Swiss Cottage until 1910, and then at St Paul's Girls' School in Hammersmith until 1913. That year, Gluck was awarded a Royal Drawing Society silver star. Gluck attended St John's Wood School of Art between 1913 and 1916, after which the artist moved to the west Cornwall valley of Lamorna, joining the artists' colony there. Gluck moved to Cornwall with fellow art student, and partner, E M Craig, (1893-1968), who was known by just the surname Craig. Little is known about Craig, but the relationship was significant to Gluck, who often spoke in later life of how the two had run away together. By 1918, they were living together in London, originally in a flat on the Finchley Road, then in a studio in Earls Court. For a time, they also maintained a studio in Lamorna.

Gluck was supported financially by family money, although Gluck had limited control over the capital.

=== Persona and early career ===
In the artistic community of Lamorna, Gluck began to adopt a masculine appearance and to defy fashion and gender norms. In 1916, Alfred Munnings painted Gluck smoking a pipe. Gluck insisted on being known only by a mononym, with "no prefix, suffix, or quotes", and when an art society of which Gluck was vice president identified Gluck as "Miss Gluck" on its letterhead, Gluck resigned. In 1923 Romaine Brooks painted Gluck as Peter, a Young English Girl. Gluck identified with no artistic school or movement and showed work only in solo exhibitions.

Gluck's work was displayed in a frame which the artist had invented and patented in 1932. The Gluck frame rose from the wall in three tiers, each tier smaller than the one behind it. Painted or papered to match the wall on which it was hung, it was designed to make the artist's paintings look like part of the architecture of the room.

=== 1920s and 1930s ===
In the 1920s and 30s, Gluck became known for portraits and floral paintings; the latter were favoured by the interior decorator Syrie Maugham. In October 1924, Gluck first had a solo exhibition of fifty-six paintings at the Dorien Leigh Galleries in South Kensington, London. During 1925, Gluck painted a series of works depicting theatre scenes, which formed part of the 1926 Stage and Country exhibition at the Fine Art Society in London. That year Gluck's father bought Bolton House in West Hampstead where Gluck, with a housekeeper, a cook, and a maid, lived until 1939.

By 1928, Gluck was sharing Bolton House with the author and socialite Sybil Cookson. In 1931, the architect Edward Maufe designed and built a studio extension to the house. The following year Gluck had another solo exhibition, Diverse Paintings, at the Fine Art Society and also began a relationship with floral designer Constance Spry, whose work informed the artist's paintings. In 1934, Gluck and Spry spent some time at Hammamet in Tunisia.

=== Medallion ===
Medallion (1937) depicts Gluck (right) with Nesta Obermer (left).

In May 1936, Gluck spent a weekend with Nesta Obermer at the Obermer family home, Mill House at Plumpton, East Sussex, and later declared 25 May as their wedding day. Gluck ended the relationship with Spry and held a bonfire of personal letters, diaries and paintings at Bolton House.

One of Gluck's best-known paintings, Medallion, is a dual portrait of Gluck and Nesta Obermer, inspired by a night in 1936 when the lovers attended a Fritz Busch production of Mozart's Don Giovanni. According to Gluck's biographer Diana Souhami, "They sat together in the third row and felt the intensity of the music fused them both into one person and matched their love." Gluck referred to it as the "YouWe" picture.

In 1937, Gluck had a third solo show at the Fine Art Society. The exhibition of thirty-three paintings, including Medallion, was attended by the Queen.

=== Thirty-year hiatus ===
While Gluck's early artwork was positively received by critics and the public through the 1920s and 1930s, it later fell from popularity. As the painter's romantic relationship with Nesta came to an end, so too did Gluck's artistic career. There followed a thirty-year period of artist's block, until Gluck experienced a rejuvenation of creative energy at the end of the 1960s.

=== World War II ===
In September 1939, Gluck closed Bolton House, which was then requisitioned by the Auxiliary Fire Service for war-time service, and moved to a cottage close to the Obermer home in Plumpton.

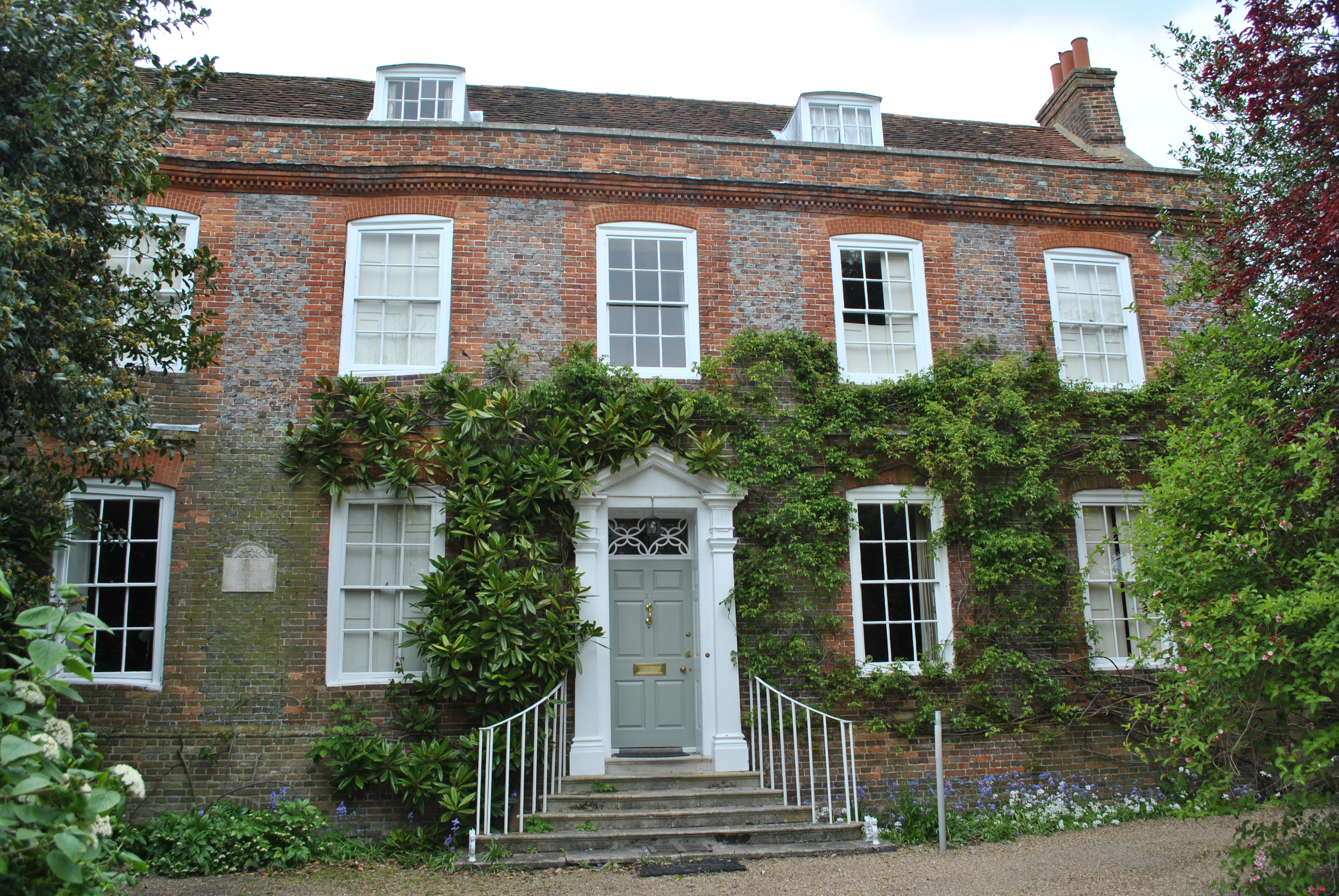
Chantry House, Steyning, 2017

In 1943, Gluck met journalist Edith Shackleton Heald, and the two took holidays in Brighton and at Lyme Regis in Dorset. The following year, Gluck moved to Chantry House in Steyning, Sussex, and lived there, with Edith and her sister Nora, until the artist's death in 1978.

In 1944, Gluck had an exhibition at Steyning Grammar School. In 1945, Gluck sold Bolton House but retained the studio, continuing to use it for a few years, eventually selling it in 1949 to artist and author Ithell Colquhoun.

=== The "Paint war" ===
In the 1950s, Gluck became dissatisfied with the paints available for artists and began a "paint war" to improve their quality. Gluck felt that some paints were grainy in consistency or looked 'dead' on the canvas. Gluck also said that some paints changed their apparent colour according to the direction of the brushstroke, and that some took too long to dry.

Ultimately, Gluck persuaded the British Standards Institution to create a new standard for oil paints. However, the campaign consumed Gluck's time and energy to the exclusion of painting for more than a decade. During this time, Gluck and Edith acquired their second home at Dolphin Cottage, in Lamorna.

=== Later life ===
In the artist's seventies, Gluck returned to painting, using special handmade paints that were supplied free by a manufacturer who had taken Gluck's exacting standards as a challenge. Gluck mounted another well-received solo show of fifty-two paintings from across the artist's whole career.

It was Gluck's first exhibition since 1944, and also the last. Gluck's last major work, begun in 1970 and completed in 1973, was a painting of a decomposing fish head on the beach titled Rage, Rage against the Dying of the Light; the title is taken from the poem "Do Not Go Gentle into That Good Night" by Dylan Thomas.

In 1977, Gluck donated 57 items, including clothing, accessories and pieces relating to the time spent in Tunisia to the Brighton Museum & Art Gallery.

Gluck died in 1978 in Steyning, Sussex at the age of 82.

== Legacy ==
In 1980, two years after the artist's death, The Fine Art Society hosted a six-week memorial exhibition of 45 of Gluck's paintings.

In 1982, Virago Press chose Medallion, Gluck's self-portrait with Nesta Obermer, as the cover art for its mass-market paperback edition of The Well of Loneliness. Virago reprinted the classic 1928 novel eight times in as many years, making Medallion perhaps one of the most famous depictions of a lesbian relationship.

July-August 1998 saw "a small but beautifully curated exhibition of some of the most memorable paintings" by Gluck, in Bexhill-on-Sea, at the De La Warr Pavilion.

In 2017-2018, Gluck was the subject of an exhibition at the Brighton Museum & Art Gallery, an accompanying book of the same title (Gluck: Art and Identity, Yale University Press), and an academic event at the London College of Fashion featuring the authors and curators Martin Pel, Dr Jeffrey Horsley and Prof Amy de la Haye.

Gluck's painting Flora's Cloak (circa 1923) was acquired by Tate in 2019 "with funds provided by the Denise Coates Foundation on the occasion of the 2018 centenary of women gaining the right to vote in Britain".

A 1942 self-portrait was donated by the artist to the National Portrait Gallery in 1973, and was used in the 2001-2002 exhibition Mirror Mirror: Self-Portraits by Women Artists. The NPG also holds a photographic portrait of the artist by Emil Otto ('E.O.') Hoppé Paintings by Gluck are held in major British public collections.

Gluck was commemorated with a Google Doodle in Britain and several other countries on 13 August 2023.

Two of Gluck's paintings, Tulips and Medallion (You/We) were exhibited in the Clark Art Institute's 2025 exhibit, A Room of Her Own: Women Artists-Activists in Britain, 1875-1945.
