= Chantry House, Steyning =

House in West Sussex, England

Chantry House
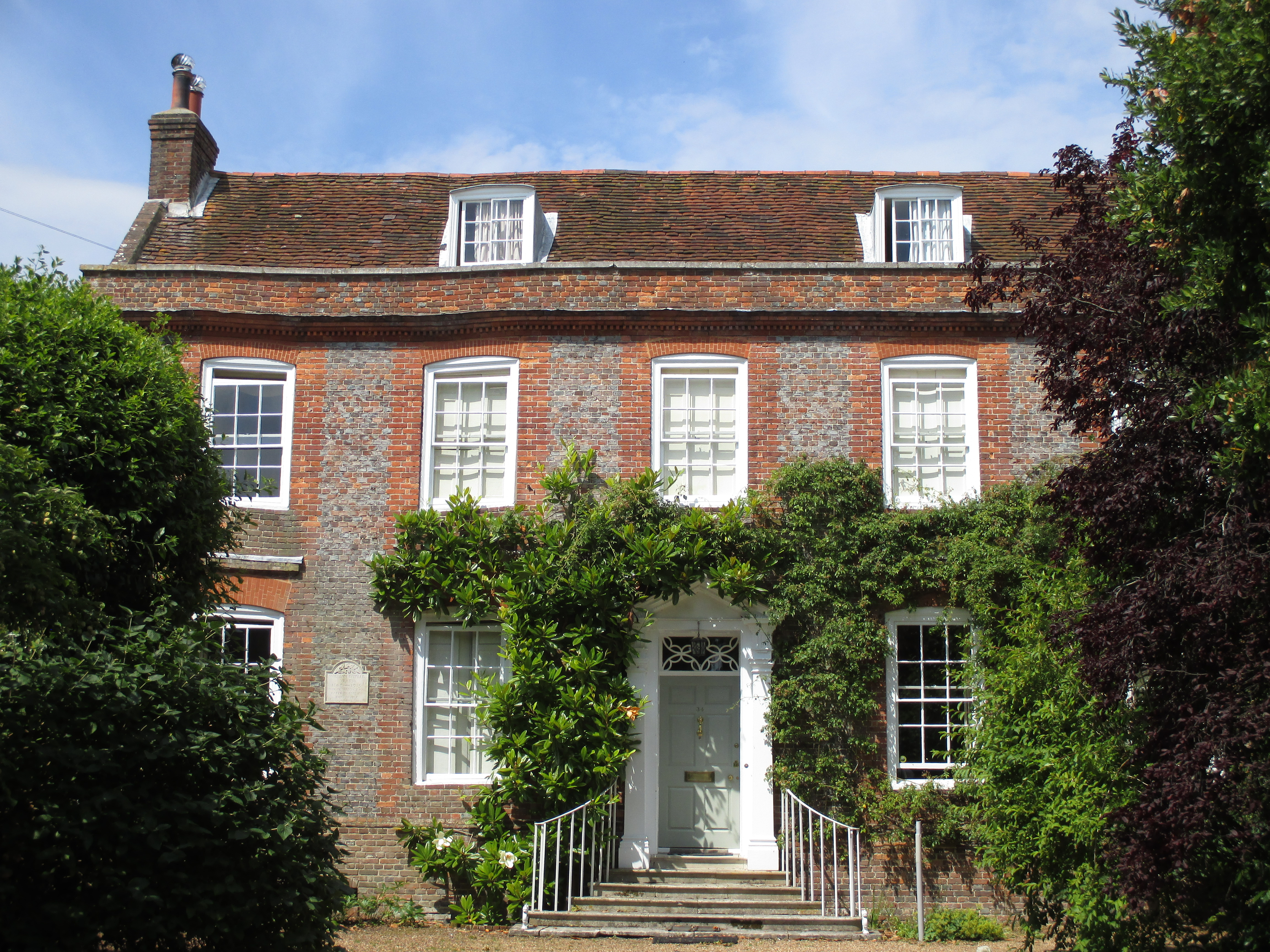
- Chantry House in 2017

- Location within West Sussex

General information
- Location: 34 Church Street, Steyning, West Sussex, England
- Coordinates: 50.88935°N 0.32774°W
- Year built: 18th century

Listed Building – Grade II*
- Official name: Chantry House
- Designated: 15 March 1955
- Reference no.: 1194515

The Chantry House is a house at 34 Church Street in Steyning, West Sussex, England.

It is a Grade II* listed building, built in the 18th century.

There is a tablet on the building, upon which is inscribed "William Butler Yeats, 1859–1939, wrote many of his later poems in this house".

The artist Gluck lived there with their longtime lover, Edith Shackleton Heald, who died in 1976 followed by Gluck in 1978.

As of 2007, the house is lived in by Gluck's former doctor.

== See also ==
- Grade II* listed buildings in West Sussex
