= Revolutionary Conservative Caucus =

British right-wing pressure group

- Formation: November 1992

The Revolutionary Conservative Caucus was a small, right-wing pressure group which attempted to introduce a new radicalism into British conservatism.

It was founded in November 1992 by Stuart Millson, an officer of the Western Goals Institute, and Jonathan Bowden; members included Mark Cotterill, Tom Acton and Steve Brady formerly of the National Front and Derek Turner. Millson's close friend from the Monday Club, Gregory Lauder-Frost, acknowledged he was a "supporter" in a letter published in one of their journals.

== Influence ==
It met limited success in its short existence of just over two years, lacking a substantive membership base. Sir Norman Fowler attacked them, stating in The Sunday Express: "These people are not remotely typical of mainstream Conservatives", and Jerry Hayes, Conservative Party MP was quoted in the same newspaper as saying "They are a grim bunch". Labour MEP Glyn Ford went even further by announcing at the 1993 Labour Party Conference: "The Tories have a far-Right tendency....I have passed details of the Revolutionary Conservative Caucus to Special Branch". However the Conservative MP Rupert Allason was quoted in Searchlight magazine as saying "If they are against Maastricht, they can't be bad." Although disbanded after Millson and Bowden parted company at the end of 1994, it "managed to redraw a right-wing nationalist agenda" and played a crucial part towards introducing philosophical discussion into far-right politics in Britain and was an influence on the establishment of the magazine Right Now! which was edited by Derek Turner.

In its lifetime, the Revolutionary Conservative Caucus published policy papers as well as a magazine entitled The Revolutionary Conservative.
