= Australian League of Rights =

Far-right political organisation in Australia

- Formation: South Australia: 1946; Nationwide: 1960
- Founder: Eric Butler
- Type: Social credit Anti-communism; Antisemitism; Anti-liberalism; Christian right White nationalism
- Purpose: Political and cultural organisation
- Location: Australia
- Website: http://www.alor.org

The Australian League of Rights is a far-right and antisemitic political organisation in Australia. It was founded in Adelaide, South Australia, by Eric Butler in 1946, and organised nationally in 1960. It inspired groups like the Canadian League of Rights (1968), the New Zealand League of Rights (1970) and the British League of Rights (1971), with principles based on the economic theory of Social credit expounded by C. H. Douglas. The League describes itself as upholding the virtues of freedom, with stated values of "loyalty to God, Queen and Country".

In 1972, Butler created an umbrella group, the Crown Commonwealth League of Rights, to represent these four groups, and which also served as a chapter of the World League for Freedom and Democracy.

== History ==
The League was formed in South Australia in 1946, with the national organisation being launched in 1960. The League formed offshoots in the white dominions: namely, Canada, New Zealand and Britain. In 1972, Butler created an umbrella group, the Crown Commonwealth League of Rights, to represent these four groups; which also served as a chapter of the World Anti-Communist League. It was also linked with far right groups in the United States such as the John Birch Society. The first Crown Commonwealth League of Rights conference was held in Melbourne in 1979.

Veritas is the publishing company of the League, which publishes a weekly newsletter called On Target.

== Political views and ideology ==
From the start, the League has described itself as being based on the principles of Christianity. It is anti-communist and anti-World Government. Its defend a distributive political economy, based on social credit, a form of socialism. They are monarchist and opposed to Australian republicanism and see strong relations with Great Britain as fundamental to Australian identity.

The League has been described as neo-Nazi in various sources although at least one writer differentiated it from neo-Nazi groups saying that unlike such groups, the League "under the leadership of Eric Butler, sought to maintain a veneer of respectability..." while using its publications to promote "the crudest forms of anti-Semitism... Butler's The International Jew presented the argument that "Hitler's policy was a Jewish policy". The Global Project Against Hate and Extremism (GPAHE) released a report on 5 October 2022, in which it classified the Australian League of Rights as a "conspiracy," "antisemitism," and "white nationalist" group.

In Faces of hate: hate crime in Australia, David Greason wrote: "The League is not Nazi, yet its propaganda themes are similar in many ways to those used in Nazi Germany 60 years ago. The League refuses to acknowledge any similarities with neo-Nazi organisations, and either points to its philosophical opposition to the centralisation of power, or claims that neo-Nazi organisations are created by powerful Jewish organisations to discredit patriotic groups. In fact, the League has always had a relationship of sorts with such groups. They read the same books, cite the same authorities, and blame the same scapegoats. The nuances of any anti-centralist philosophy are invariably lost on the average neo-Nazi".

=== Antisemitism ===
Andrew Moore has cited antisemitism as the "touchstone of the League's ideology", although the League has in the past characterised antisemitism as "a political swear word used to criticise those who do not agree with Zionist policies". The League has described the Holocaust as the "alleged Holocaust" and the "Holocaust Hoax". Its founder, Eric Butler, was well known for his antisemitism and support of such documents as the Protocols of the Elders of Zion, a well-known antisemitic hoax. The historian Andrew Markus wrote that "In the 1990s league publications were still promoting The Protocols, describing the Holocaust as a 'hoax', the invention of Zionist propagandists, identifying prominent Jews in public life and declaring that modern Christianity was 'little more than a form of Liberal Judaism'. The Jewish plot was also described using various code words, notably the 'one world conspiracy' hatched by 'international elites', international bureaucracies, international bankers, members of the Fabian Society, or the United Nations.".

The League supported Holocaust denier David Irving and assisted his visits to Australia; Veritas published Irving's work in Australia.

=== Opposition to liberal democracy ===
The league is opposed to liberal democracy, the party system and the processes of parliamentary democracy. However, the league has tried to use entryism or support various political parties and community or social groups.

Butler in his book The Money Power versus Democracy (1940) stated "The Party system of Government can play little part, if any, in the struggle for real democracy. In principle, it is the antithesis of democracy."

C. H. Douglas regarded the party system as a "criminal absurdity" and argued for the end of the secret ballot. He believed that with the implementation of social credit, party politics would end.

== Connections to political parties ==
In the early 1970s, the League attempted to gain control of the National Party of Australia, encouraging members to join the party in sufficient numbers to take control, a tactic known as entryism. Doug Anthony, who had recently become the Nationals' leader, led an effort to defend the party from the League by recruiting people whom he could rely upon to vote against League candidates. After a struggle lasting several years, Anthony's forces prevailed. A consequence of this struggle was that the National Party had more members than either of the Labor or Liberal parties, despite always getting a fraction of the electoral support which the other two parties obtained. This fact became much more widely known than the reason for it, both sides having kept the struggle out of the media.

Many years later various League members offered support to the One Nation party.

Former Western Australian Labor MP, founder of the Australia First Party and later One Nation member Graeme Campbell was associated with the league at the same time as he was a member of One Nation and Australia First. In 2001 Campbell stated that "Australia First has no association with the League. It's me with the association."

During 1987, Liberal MP Alexander Downer made an address to the League, a fact which was not made publicly known until seven years afterwards, when Downer had become his party's leader; he was apparently unaware of the League's history at the time he made the speech. It was one of Downer's many mistakes that would ultimately see him step down from the leadership in 1995.

Then treasurer Peter Costello, in 1998, stated that One Nation's policy of a state bank which would issue low-interest loans was directly taken from the League, and that "the League of Rights is driving its policy in relation to banking and money".

== Connections to other groups ==
The League operates, and has operated, a number of front organisations such as the Institute of Economic Democracy, the Christian Institute of Individual Freedom, and the Australian Heritage Society.

During the 1960s and 1970s, some members of the League were also involved with the Rhodesia-Australia Association. This led to tensions within the Rhodesia-Australia Association.

The league has been linked with Australians Against Further Immigration (AAFI). Franca Arena raised a question in the New South Wales Legislative Council in 1994 about the links between the AAFI and the "notorious and dangerous League of Rights, which has been described as the most influential, effective, best organised and most substantially financed racist organisation in Australia". She questioned whether the AAFI was just a front for the League.

In 1998, the Australian branch of the B'nai B'rith Anti-Defamation Commission issued a press release that "The Co-founder of Australians Against Further Immigration (AAFI), and One Nation's Victorian leader Robyn Spencer has addressed numerous League of Rights meetings as well as delivered a speech with League of Rights, Advisory National Director Eric Butler."

== See also ==
- Eric Butler
- Far-right politics in Australia
- British League of Rights
- Canadian League of Rights
- New Zealand League of Rights
- Social credit
  - Douglas Credit Party (Australia)
  - Social Credit Party (New Zealand)
  - Canadian social credit movement
