= Tory Action =

Right-wing pressure group

Tory Action was a right-wing pressure group within the British Conservative Party, founded in November 1974 by George Kennedy Young and Airey Neave and right-wing defectors from the Monday Club.

== Activities ==
It was a secretive outfit in which membership was only open to Conservative Party members of two or more years standing, although their 'Aims' simply say "paid-up members". Its published 'Aims' state that "we do not have a corporate creed and our membership holds a variety of views but most feel strongly on sound public finance, on the need for denationalisation, European Union reform, law and order, combatting subversion, halting the growth of the non-European population in the UK, and a repatriation programme."

It published a newsletter entitled The Round Robin.

The group claimed to have a "country-wide network of Conservative office-holders and activists" and claimed credit for canvassing for Margaret Thatcher in her constituency for the 1979 General Election. In 1981, George Young claimed it had the support of at least 25 Conservative MPs, including Ronald Bell who had hosted a Tory Action reception in the House of Commons in December 1980.

By 1990, the Tory Action Committee consisted of (Chairman) ?, Adrian Davies, Stephen Derry, Geoffrey W Bevan, Michael R Wheddon.

The group ceased activities in the early 1990s.
