= George Kennedy Young =

British intelligence officer (1911–1990)

- Born: 8 April 1911; Dumfries, Dumfriesshire, Scotland, United Kingdom
- Died: 9 May 1990 (aged 79); Charing Cross Hospital, London, England, United Kingdom
- Education: University of St Andrews; Yale University
- Occupation: Deputy director of MI6

George Kennedy Young, CB, MBE, M.A. (8 April 1911 – 9 May 1990) was a deputy director of MI6, and later involved in British Conservative Party politics. He was also a merchant banker.

== Early life ==
George Kennedy Young was born in Dumfries, and was raised by his parents in the United Free Church. He was educated at Dumfries Academy and the University of St Andrews, where he studied French and German and spent two years as an exchange student at the Universities of Dijon (now the University of Burgundy) and Giessen respectively. After graduating with a first-class degree in 1934, Young secured a Commonwealth Fellowship to study Political Science at Yale University. During his undergraduate years he was a left-wing partisan, with "strong Independent Labour Party views". Before the Second World War he was on the editorial staff of the Glasgow Herald.

== Career in British intelligence ==
He was commissioned in 1940 as an officer in the King's Own Scottish Borderers regiment but later transferred to British intelligence. In his book Inside Intelligence, Anthony Cavendish, a friend and colleague of Young, includes a seventeen-page summary of Young's career (Young also wrote the foreword for this book). According to Cavendish, Young's intelligence career started in the Second World War. He was employed first in Africa and later in Italy and North-West Europe, where his work involved 'playing back' captured enemy agents as channels for disinformation. Young became an expert in the methods of the Italian Fascist police system and those of the German secret services.

Following the war, after a brief return to journalism, Young returned to the Secret Intelligence Service (SIS) as head of its Vienna station, where he was involved in running agents in South-East Europe. In 1949 he was made head of SIS's economic requirements section (R6), their point of contact with the Treasury, the Board of Trade and the Bank of England. In 1951 he was appointed controller of SIS operations in the 'Middle East Area', which stretched from Morocco to Afghanistan and down to Ethiopia. Here he became involved in implementing the Anglo-American decision to remove the Iranian leader Mossadeq and reinstate the Shah. According to Cavendish, the Shah later said of Young that "In times of crisis he is a man who can take decisions and throw caution to the winds. Young is a man who believes that friendship cuts both ways and that Britain should stand by her friends even at the risk of offending others." In 1953 Young was recalled to London to take over as SIS Director of Requirements and in 1956, during the Suez Crisis, he was again put in charge of Middle East Operations. In 1959 he was appointed Vice Chief of the Secret Service. His dissatisfaction with the Macmillan government led him to resign as Deputy of MI6 in 1961 and enter merchant banking.

== Political activity ==
Shortly after settling down into merchant banking, G. K. (as he was commonly known) became Chairman of the libertarian Society for Individual Freedom. He was also an early and leading member of the Conservative Monday Club, serving on the Executive Council and several of its policy committees (he was Chairman of the Action Fund from 1967 to 1969 and later Chairman of the Economics Committee). He was strongly opposed to immigration, supporting Enoch Powell's line, and helped found the club's immigration committee. After losing an acrimonious election for the position of club chairman to Jonathan Guinness in 1974, in which he had been supported by the National Front, he set up the right-wing group Tory Action. That same year, Young stood as the Conservative candidate for Brent East in the February General Election, losing badly to the sitting Labour MP Reg Freeson in what was later described as a "gesture of principle". In 1976, assisted by the Conservative MP Frederic Bennett, Young created the vigilante group Unison, described by the academic Rory Cormac as "ready to intervene when law and order broke down amidst a communist takeover."

A London-based Czech spy, Jan Mrazek, has cited Young as a likely conspirator in a plot to undermine Edward Heath. David Leigh wrote that Young was closely associated with alleged attempts to undermine the Labour government of Harold Wilson in the mid-1960s, that he regarded the Tory government of Edward Heath as virtually socialist, and planned action to remove those he considered enemies of the state: "a security counter-action need cover no more than 5,000 persons, including some 40 MPs., not all of them Labour; several hundred journalists and media employees, plus their supporting academics and clerics; the full-time members and main activists of the C.P.G.B. and the Socialist Workers' Party; and the directing elements of the 30 or 40 bodies affecting concern and compassion for youth, age, civil liberties, social research, and minority grievances."

In November 2015, the then Labour MP John Mann said that information provided to him indicated that Young was involved in a right-wing Conservative group which gathered details on alleged paedophiles within the House of Commons. Young was not named as a paedophile but Mann described him as a “manipulator” who had been involved in "dubious" political activities, including a campaign to set up a private army.

== Family ==
In June 1939 Young married Geraldine Wilhelmine Christine Harthoorn (born 21 December 1913 in Pandang/Celebes, Dutch East Indies; died 8 October 2000 in London), a daughter of M. A. G. Harthoorn, a Dutch lawyer and president of the court at Batavia, Dutch East Indies, and Gerardina Willemina Christina Brunsveld van Hulten. Geraldine (known as Géryke) was a strong supporter of her husband's political convictions, often voicing what John Bruce Lockhart euphemistically referred to as "her views about the role of different ethnic groups." Lockhart surmised that "It is hard to estimate the degree of influence she had over Young's change from a left-wing student of the 1930s to a powerful figure in the right-wing Monday Club, but it was substantial." The marriage remained childless.

== Publications ==
- Young, George K., Masters of Indecision, Methuen, London, 1962.
- Young, George K., Merchant Banking - Practice & Prospects, London, 1966.
- Young, George K., Finance and World Power, London, 1968.
- Young, George K., Who Goes Home, Monday Club, London, May 1969, (P/B).
- Young, George K., Who is My Liege - Loyalty and Betrayal in our Time, London, 1972.
- Young, George K., Subversion and the British Riposte, Ossian, Glasgow, 1984, ISBN 0-947621-02-4
- Young, George K., The Final Testimony of George Kennedy Young, published Lobster Magazine 19, 1990
