= European Journal =

- Starring: Cathy Smith
- Country of origin: Germany
- Original languages: German; English
- No. of episodes: N/A

Original release
- Network: DW
- Release: 1992 – 2014

European Journal was a weekly, 30-minute Deutsche Welle (DW) news programme produced in English from 1992 to 2014. It was broadcast from Brussels, Belgium and primarily covered political and economic developments across the European Union and the rest of Europe, as well as issues of particular concern to Germany.

In North America, European Journal had previously been available on the now-defunct Newsworld International network. It also aired in New York City on CUNY TV and on some PBS stations.
