= Traditional Britain Group =

British far-right pressure group

- Abbreviation: TBG
- Formation: 2001
- Purpose: Traditionalist conservatism
- Location: United Kingdom
- President: Vacant
- Website: traditionalbritain.org

The Traditional Britain Group (TBG) is a British far-right pressure group that describes itself as traditionalist conservative and "home to the disillusioned patriot". It was founded in 2001 by Gregory Lauder-Frost, with Merlin Hanbury-Tracy, 7th Baron Sudeley as its president. Sudeley was still in office when he died in 2022.

Advocacy group Hope not Hate claimed in 2017 that TBG is part of a UK-wide network linked to the European alt-right. Private Eye has described TBG as far-right and a successor to the Western Goals Institute (WGI).

== History and ideology ==
TBG was founded in 2001. It opposes non-white immigration to the UK and, prior to Brexit, it opposed the UK's European Union membership. The organisation's stated principles include opposition to egalitarianism; the centrality of the heterosexual family as the primary social unit; traditional Christian values and maintaining the Church of England as England's established church; rolling back of the welfare state; and opposition to immigration, multiculturalism, political correctness and Marxism.

TBG is in favour of state-sponsored repatriation. Their Facebook page carried a post calling for the deportation of anti-racist campaigner Doreen Lawrence and "millions of others ... to their natural homelands". Gregory Lauder-Frost, the founder of TBG, called Lawrence a spiv. Lauder-Frost was formerly the officer of the Conservative pressure group Monday Club and vice-president of the Western Goals Institute.

== Speakers ==
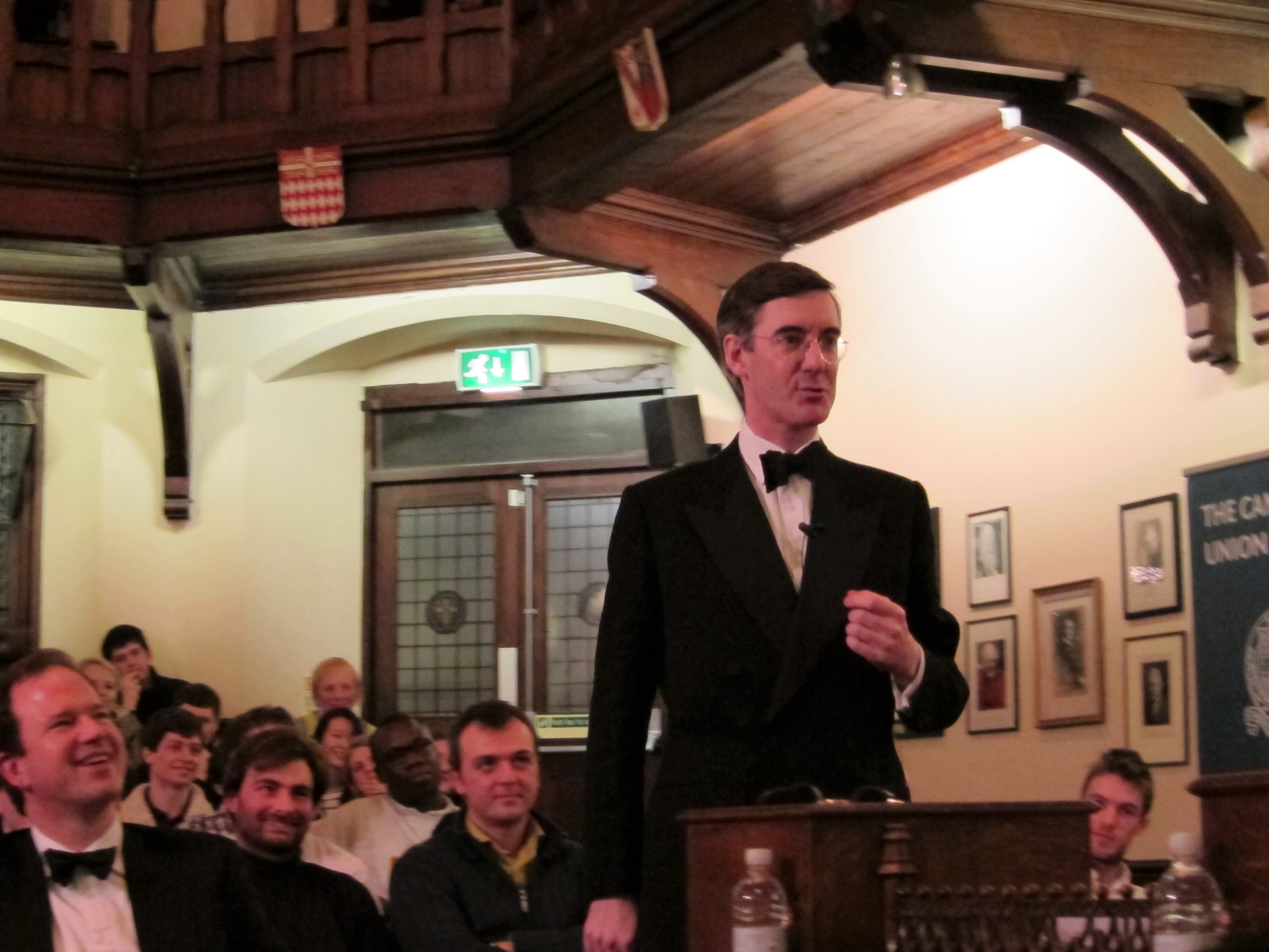
The group came to prominence after it was announced that Jacob Rees-Mogg (pictured here at the Cambridge Union, a debating society) spoke as guest of honour in 2013. He later called his attendance 'a mistake'.

TBG has been addressed by speakers such as Simon Heffer and Sir Roger Scruton. In 2011, Gerard Batten, former leader of the UK Independence Party (UKIP) spoke at the group's annual dinner; upon his election as leader, UKIP said Batten "does not share the views of TBG. He is invited by many organisations to speak and TBG had a list of reputable speakers such as Simon Heffer previous to his invitation. Since he attended things have come to light. He would not consider a further invitation."

TBG came to national prominence when Liberal Conspiracy said Conservative MP Jacob Rees-Mogg spoke as a guest of honour at the TBG's 2013 annual dinner. Three months later, this led to criticism of Rees-Mogg, who then said he had not properly checked the organisation before speaking, despite being warned by Searchlight about TBG's far-right associations prior to attendance; Rees-Mogg disassociated himself from the group and apologised for his attendance, calling it "a mistake". It was also attended by former Ulster Unionist Party MP John Taylor, Baron Kilclooney. Two months later, American white nationalist Richard Spencer was invited to address the group.

Hope not Hate noted the 2017 annual conference was addressed by Anne Marie Waters, former UKIP candidate and founder of the For Britain party, and Martin Sellner, leader of the Austrian Identitarian Movement (German: Identitäre Bewegung Österreich). Among the attendees was Mark Collett, former leader of the youth wing of the British National Party and founder of far-right campaign group Patriotic Alternative. In March of that year, the Bow Group granted TBG a special concession to its 65th anniversary celebrations.

In October 2018, James Thompson, a former senior lecturer at University College London, pulled out of his speaking slot at the group's annual conference at the last minute following pressure from the media. Thompson lost his honorary professorship at UCL after Private Eye "revealed he had been organising secretive conferences on racial eugenics – and inviting notorious white supremacists" (see London Conference on Intelligence controversy). The columnist Katie Hopkins spoke at TBG's 2018 annual conference.

Estonian Finance Minister Martin Helme addressed the 2019 conference, as did the vice-chairman of the Polish National Movement Krzysztof Bosak.

Katie Fanning, a former director of UKIP, spoke at the 2021 conference on the subject of "anti-white messaging and critical race theory-based teachings" in Britain's universities, and that she was suing her former university for discrimination. Gunnar Beck, a German far-right politician, academic and lawyer, spoke to the group on the "Strange Death of Europe".

Danes Helmuth Nyborg and Emil Kirkegaard spoke at the 2022 conference.

== See also ==
- Cornerstone Group
- Conservative Democratic Alliance
- Eldon League
- Far-right politics in the United Kingdom
- London Forum (far-right group)
