= Stanley R. Barrett =

Canadian social anthropologist

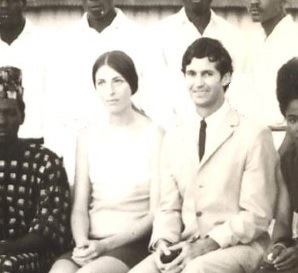
Kaye and Stan Barrett in Nigeria in the 1960s.

Stanley Raymond Barrett (25 April 1938 – 19 October 2021) was a Canadian social anthropologist and Professor Emeritus at the University of Guelph. His work spanned political anthropology and social theory, with particular focus on nationalism, racism, and right-wing movements in Canada, as well as earlier ethnographic research in West Africa. He was recognized for combining field-based research with critical engagement in anthropological theory and political culture.

== Early life and education ==
Barrett was born in Orangeville, Ontario. He earned a BA in English Literature and Philosophy from Acadia University (1963), an MA in Anthropology from the University of Toronto (1968), and a PhD in Social Anthropology from the University of Sussex (1971). Before completing his doctoral studies, he taught secondary school in Nigeria, an experience that shaped his early ethnographic research interests.

== Academic career ==
Barrett taught for many years in the University of Guelph's Department of Sociology and Anthropology and later became Professor Emeritus. He held visiting appointments and affiliations that included the Nigerian Institute of Social and Economic Research (University of Ibadan), the School of Oriental and African Studies (University of London), and other institutions.

== Research and publications ==
Barrett's research spanned West Africa, anthropological theory, political culture, and Canadian far-right movements, combining ethnographic fieldwork with broader theoretical inquiry.

=== Nigeria, communalism, and religious movements ===
Barrett's early work focused on social and religious change in Nigeria. In Two Villages on Stilts: Economic and Family Change in Nigeria (1974) and The Rise and Fall of an African Utopia: A Wealthy Theocracy in Comparative Perspective (1977), he examined processes of modernization, communal organization, and religious authority. A review in Anthropologica highlighted the book's comparative approach to political and religious structures and situated it within broader debates on development and social transformation.

=== Anthropological theory ===
Barrett later contributed to debates in anthropological theory. The Rebirth of Anthropological Theory (1984) was described in Philosophy of the Social Sciences as an effort to reassess foundational debates within the discipline. His later textbook, Anthropology: A Student's Guide to Theory and Method (2009), synthesized these concerns for students and reflected his emphasis on theory and pedagogy.

=== Racism and the far right in Canada ===
Barrett's ethnographic research on white supremacist and far-right movements in Canada culminated in Is God a Racist? The Right Wing in Canada (1987). Reviews described the book as a detailed and empirically grounded analysis of the relationship between religion, nationalism, and extremist politics.

=== Rural Ontario ===
In Paradise: Class, Commuters and Ethnicity in Rural Ontario (1994), Barrett examined class formation and changing social identities in a rural Canadian context. A review in Culture highlighted the book's contribution to understanding local social dynamics and evolving rural identities.

=== Later work ===
Barrett's later publications, including Culture Meets Power (2002) and The Lamb and the Tiger: From Peacekeepers to Peacewarriors in Canada (2018), continued his focus on the relationship between culture, political authority, and conflict.

== Reception and impact ==
Barrett's work has been described as bridging ethnographic research and broader theoretical concerns in anthropology and political sociology. Reviews of The Rebirth of Anthropological Theory noted its effort to revisit and critically assess foundational debates within the discipline. His study of Canadian far-right movements, Is God a Racist?, was characterized by reviewers as a detailed and empirically grounded analysis of religion and extremist politics in Canada.

His work on rural Ontario, particularly Paradise, was recognized for its analysis of class, ethnicity, and social change at the local level. Earlier work on West Africa was situated by scholars within comparative discussions of political and religious systems.

Barrett's contributions to anthropological theory were also discussed in broader disciplinary contexts, including in journals such as Philosophy of the Social Sciences and Anthropologica.

His work has also been cited in subsequent scholarship on anthropological theory.

== Personal life ==
Barrett was married and had two children. He died on 19 October 2021 at the age of 83.

== Selected works ==
- Two Villages on Stilts: Economic and Family Change in Nigeria (1974)
- The Rise and Fall of an African Utopia: A Wealthy Theocracy in Comparative Perspective (1977)
- The Rebirth of Anthropological Theory (1984)
- Is God a Racist? The Right Wing in Canada (1987)
- Paradise: Class, Commuters and Ethnicity in Rural Ontario (1994)
- Culture Meets Power (2002)
- Anthropology: A Student's Guide to Theory and Method (2nd ed., 2009)
- The Lamb and the Tiger: From Peacekeepers to Peacewarriors in Canada (2018)
