= Right Now! (magazine) =

British political magazine (1993–2006)

- Categories: News magazine
- First issue: 1993
- Final issue: 2006
- Country: United Kingdom
- Language: English

Right Now! was a far-right British political magazine, which ran from 1993 to 2006. The magazine also featured arts coverage and cultural criticism.

It was initially edited by Michael Harrison (an associate of Lady Birdwood), and then from 1995 until closure by Derek Turner. Contributing editors included Allan Robertson and Christopher Luke of the London Swinton Circle and Stuart Millson of the Conservative Democratic Alliance. Its origins lay in the Revolutionary Conservative Caucus and with right-wing members of the Monday Club.

It proclaimed itself a magazine of "politics, ideas and culture". It featured interviews with and articles by figures including Antony Flew, Roger Scruton, Pat Buchanan, Peter Brimelow, Frederick Forsyth, Charles Moore, Garry Bushell, Nick Griffin, Jean-Marie Le Pen, Alain de Benoist, Richard Lynn, J. Philippe Rushton, Thomas Fleming, Samuel T. Francis and C. B. Liddell.

Prominent Conservative politicians who contributed to, or were interviewed by, Right Now! include Norman Tebbit, Ann Widdecombe, John Redwood, Teddy Taylor, Teresa Gorman and Bill Cash.

The magazine was mentioned by then Foreign Secretary Robin Cook in 2000 in an attack on then Conservative Party leader William Hague's inability to contain "extremists" within the party; Cook criticised Hague for not shutting the magazine down.

Andrew Hunter, a former Conservative MP who defected to Ian Paisley's Democratic Unionist Party, was a long-time patron of the magazine. Hunter ceased links with the magazine in 2002, following pressure from Iain Duncan Smith, stating disagreement with an advert in the magazine for the Conservative Democratic Alliance which was critical of the Conservative Party.
