= The Lady (magazine) =

British women's magazine

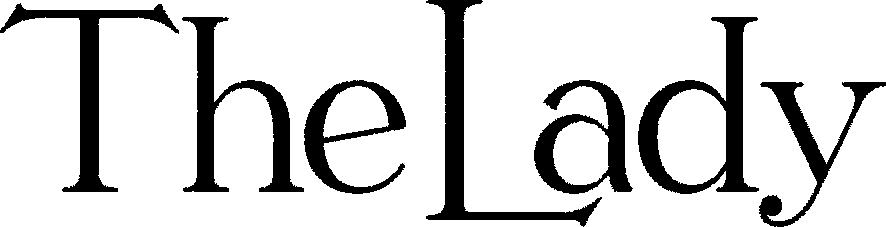

- Final issue of The Lady, 4 April 2025
- Editor: Helen Budworth (acting)
- Frequency: Monthly
- Publisher: Ben Budworth
- Founder: Thomas Gibson Bowles
- Founded: 1885
- First issue: 19 February 1885
- Final issue: April 2025
- Company: The Lady Magazine Ltd
- Country: United Kingdom
- Based in: Borehamwood
- Language: English
- Website: lady.co.uk
- ISSN: 0023-7167

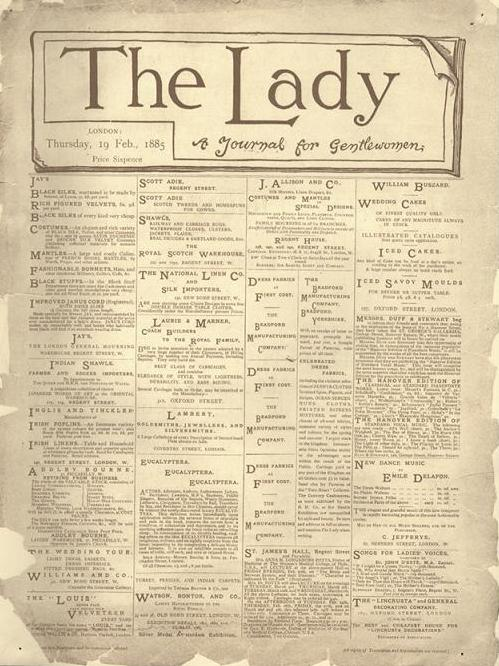
First issue of The Lady, 19 February 1885

The Lady was a British women's magazine. It published its first issue on 19 February 1885, and its last in April 2025, at which time it was the longest-running women's magazine in Britain. Based in London, it included classified advertisements for domestic service and child care and had extensive listings of holiday properties.

== History ==
The magazine was founded by Thomas Gibson Bowles (1842 – 1922), the maternal grandfather of the aristocratic and eccentric Mitford sisters. Bowles also founded the English magazine Vanity Fair. The first issue of The Lady, dated 19 February 1885, bore the subtitle "A Journal for Gentlewomen" and had advertisements for "fashionable bonnets", linen and silk fabrics, "iced savoy moulds" and sheet music for dances and for songs "for ladies voices".

Bowles himself wrote most of the first issue, under pseudonyms. He gave the Mitford girls' father (David Freeman-Mitford, 2nd Baron Redesdale) his first job: general manager of the magazine. Early contributors included Nancy Mitford and Lewis Carroll, who compiled a puzzle for the title. Rita Shell, who had been governess to Bowles' children, served as editor of The Lady from 1895 until her retirement in 1925, and put it on a successful footing.

The Lady appealed to a wealthy readership, which was rumoured to include members of the royal family. Covers featured female stars including Judi Dench, Helen Mirren and Barbra Streisand, and also Diana, Princess of Wales. Its advertisements for domestic positions meant that those seeking such work also bought it. For its wealthy readers, it offered advice on changes in acceptable behaviour, such as, in 1936, that reading novels was no longer universally "thought deplorable".

In November 2008, Bowles' great-grandson, Ben Budworth, bought The Lady from his uncle Tom Bowles and his mother, Julia Budworth, and set about modernising its style. He appointed Rachel Johnson as the magazine's ninth editor in September 2009. She took over from Arline Usden who became an editor at large. A Channel 4 programme, The Lady and the Revamp, screened in March 2010, followed the new editor in her quest to raise awareness of the magazine and increase circulation. Johnson's axing of The Lady Laughs, a cartoon series by Patricia Drennan that ran from 2000 to 2009, led to complaints by readers. Johnson responded with old issues of the magazine to show how bland it had been.

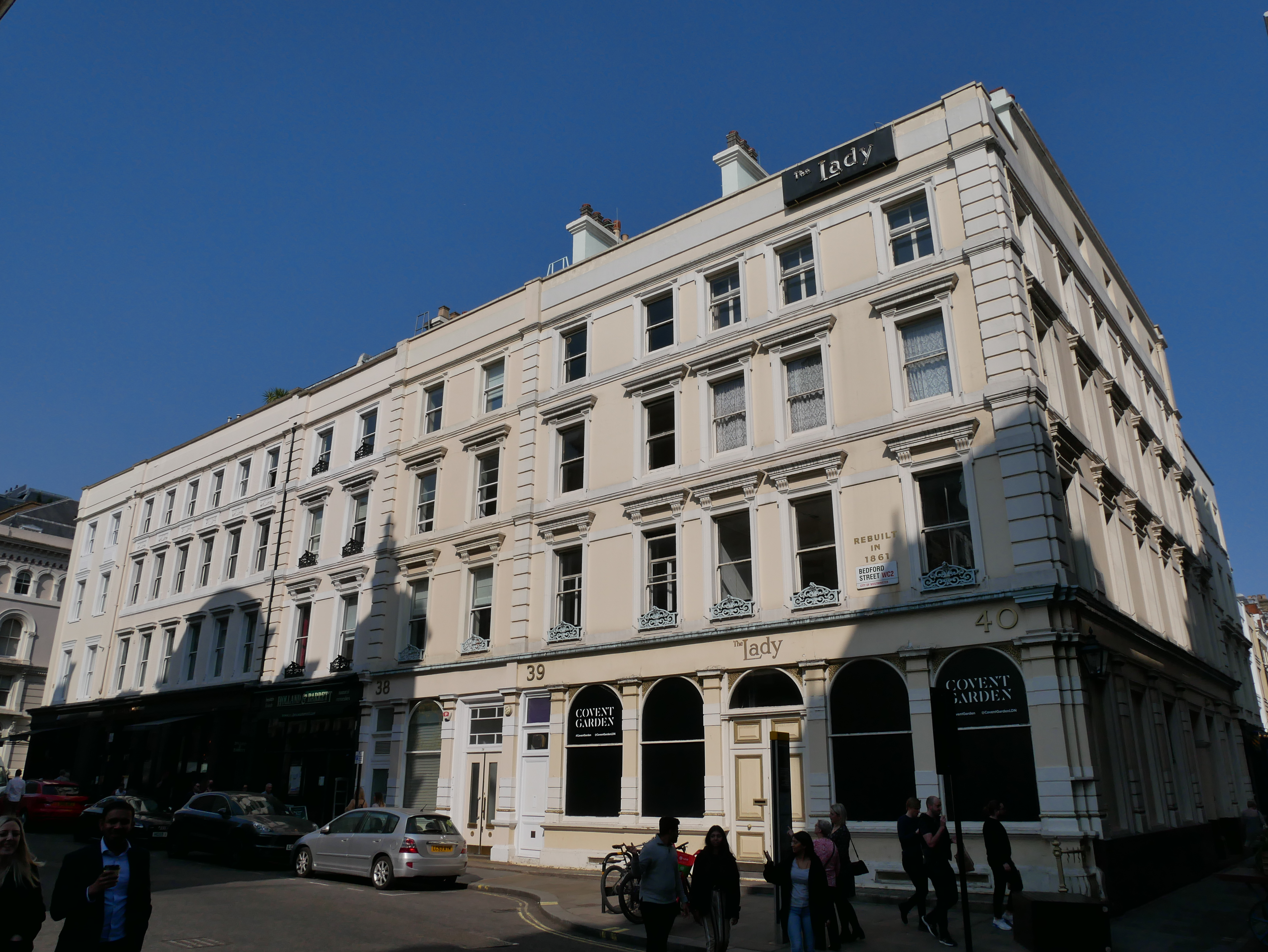
39-40 Bedford Street, former headquarters of The Lady

Matt Warren was appointed the tenth editor in January 2012. In November 2013, he was named Editor of the Year (Women's Brand Weekly or Fortnightly) by the British Society of Magazine Editors. In 2014, he was Highly Commended in the Editor of the Year category at the PPA Independent Publisher Awards.

Sam Taylor became the magazine's eleventh editor in August 2015. Under her editorship, the magazine was shortlisted for multiple awards, including PPA Cover of the Year (2016), PPA Cover of the Year 2017 and BSME Cover of the Year 2018. Taylor was shortlisted for Editor of The Year, Women's Brand 2016 at the BSME awards.

The Lady occupied premises at 39-40 Bedford Street, in the Covent Garden area of central London, until 2019, when Budworth sold the building and the magazine relocated to a business park in Borehamwood in Hertfordshire. The move was opposed by Sam Taylor and prompted her resignation. In 2022 Budworth appointed his wife, Helen Budworth, as editor.

The Lady lost money during the COVID-19 pandemic, and circulation fell below 18,000. In February 2024 HMRC issued a winding-up petition for unpaid taxes and national insurance contributions. In late March 2025, creditors were informed that the board had agreed to begin liquidation. The company confirmed that the issue dated April 2025 would be the last, although the website with its jobs listings and recruitment agency would continue. The last issue contains a recipe for gugelhupf by Tom Parker Bowles and a short story about a grandmother celebrating her 90th birthday.

== In popular culture ==
The Lady appears as Milady’s Boudoir in P. G. Wodehouse's Jeeves novels, and is mentioned more than once in the television series Downton Abbey in the context of advertising for staff. In Good Omens, a character advertises in The Lady for a nanny. In March 2010, on the long-running television series Coronation Street, Rita Sullivan found advertised in The Lady the services of Lewis Archer, a male escort, who would later seduce another character and steal her life savings. Former Rovers Return landlady Annie Walker was also a regular aficionado of The Lady, which she described as "a calm civilised voice in the midst of vulgar tumult".
