= Eric Butler =

Australian activist (1916–2006)

- Born: 7 May 1916; Benalla, Victoria, Australia
- Died: 7 June 2006 (aged 90); Victoria, Australia
- Occupations: Political activist and journalist
- Known for: Founder of the Australian League of Rights

Eric Dudley Butler (7 May 1916 – 7 June 2006) was an Australian political activist and journalist, who in 1946 founded the far-right Australian League of Rights, which he led until 1992. He was known as a staunch anti-communist and anti-Semite. He was a member of the John Birch Society, the organization co-founded by Fred C. Koch, father of the billionaire Koch Brothers.

== Background and early career ==
Butler was born in the Victorian country town of Benalla, although he lived most of his life near Melbourne. In the 1930s he became a follower of the British economist C. H. Douglas and his Social Credit theories. From 1938 Butler wrote for the Australian Social Credit newspaper New Times.

Butler served in the Australian Army during World War II. According to one of his obituarists: "He served as a gun sergeant for twenty months without leave in the Torres Straits, taught troops as an instructor at Canungra Jungle Training School for six months, transferred to the Officers Training School at Seymour, Victoria, and was honourably discharged at the end of the Pacific phase of the war."

== Political activities and publishing career ==
By the time Butler left the army, his political activities were under surveillance by Australian security authorities, as documents in the Australian archives indicate. In July 1940 the Victorian publicity censor, Crayton Burns (father of Creighton Burns, a later editor of The Age), wrote: "I have taken steps to warn the provincial and country press that the activities of this gentleman and his assistants are being closely watched by the authorities. There is no doubt that the general trend of their propaganda is damaging to the financial side of the war effort."

In December 1941, the Commonwealth's chief publicity censor, E.G. Bonney, banned a series of Butler's New Times articles, one of which described Soviet Russia as "a Jewish slave state ... controlled by international Jewish financiers in New York."

In 1945, Attorney-General H.V. Evatt began an inquiry into Butler's activities. He told Parliament: "In the opinion of the Director-General of Security, Butler has written articles constituting an attempt to create adverse public reaction to war loan campaigns and to the war effort generally." Butler was not charged.

In 1946 Butler published The International Jew, in which he claimed that Winston Churchill, Franklin D. Roosevelt and John Curtin were covert communists, that the Russian Revolution was a Jewish plot and that the Nazi Holocaust was a myth. Butler's eulogist Nigel Jackson described this book as "an essay built around an analysis of the controversial Protocols of the Elders of Zion. In it Butler challenged the Jewish role in international finance and its connections with communism. Of all Butler's publications, this was perhaps the one which roused the greatest fury." This was hardly surprising in the wake of the Nazi Holocaust, particularly since the Protocols were well known in 1947 to be a forgery.

Butler founded the South Australian League of Rights in 1946, centred on the anti-bank nationalisation campaign, and subsequently other state branches were formed, before the national Australian League of Rights was established in 1960. The League was never registered as a political party. Butler served as the League's National Director until his retirement in 1992. Although Butler ran as an independent for the Australian House of Representatives in 1951, the League was not intended to be a political party. Rather it was a lobby group and "grass roots" organisation, promoting Butler's mix of anti-communist, social credit, monarchist and pro-British ideas.

Besides the New Times, the League's many publications included the weekly On Target and the monthly Intelligence Survey. In 1949 Butler began contributing articles on national and international affairs to the Melbourne morning newspaper The Argus, then a conservative paper, but when it was revealed that the articles were based on a League of Rights study course, the series was cancelled.

In the 1960s, the League garnered much unfavorable publicity when it was revealed that members were also participating in the Liberal and Country Parties. The Country Party was a mainstream conservative rural party (now the National Party of Australia). A close associate of Butler's, Arthur Chresby, was elected to Federal Parliament in Queensland as a Liberal. This tactic achieved some success elsewhere, particularly in areas where small farmers were under economic pressure, such as Gippsland, the Riverina, the Darling Downs, the Yorke Peninsula and the Western Australian wheatbelt. The League pamphlet They Want Your Land alleged that "international financiers" were trying to force Australian farmers off their land by manipulating commodity prices. Successive Country Party and National Party leaders warned against League infiltration, and League-controlled branches were occasionally disaffiliated. Queensland Nationals Senator Ron Boswell was particularly outspoken in attacking League infiltration of the Queensland Nationals.

A Liberal federal MP, James Killen, was identified as a League supporter in the 1960s, and traveled to Europe with Butler in 1962, but later severed his connections with the League. In the 1960s and 1970s, Butler devoted much time to promoting the anti-communist philosophy of white minority regimes in Southern Africa. He traveled on multiple occasions to Rhodesia (now Zimbabwe) and South Africa, then governed under apartheid. Butler also served as a Far East correspondent for American Opinion, a magazine of the John Birch Society.

In July 1972 Butler achieved some public attention when he debated Max Teichmann, senior lecturer in politics at Monash University, on the Australian Broadcasting Corporation's Monday Conference program. Teichmann confronted Butler with his many explicit anti-Semitic statements from the 1930s and 1940s and challenged him to disavow them, a challenge which Butler evaded. The program highlighted the issue of League infiltration of the Country Party in the period before the December 1972 federal election, at which the long-serving conservative government was defeated.

The League formed a number of front organisations, including the Institute of Economic Democracy and Ladies in Line Against Communism (LILAC). In the 1990s, the League lost its position as the leading extreme right political organisation in Australia. Butler complained that Pauline Hanson and her One Nation Party had stolen his policies. It also lost support to the Citizens Electoral Council, which had been a League front, but which was taken over by followers of the American politician Lyndon LaRouche, and developed a much higher public profile than the League itself.

== Personal life ==
Butler lived most of his life in rural Victoria, in his later years on a farm at Panton Hill, where his home was used as a meeting place for League and other extreme right activists. In the 1950s he was a member of the Eltham Shire Council for some years and served as Shire President. He retired as League Director in 1992, handing control of the organisation to David Thompson, but remained politically active until shortly before his death. In 1999 he chaired an address by the Holocaust denier David Irving.

Butler died in Victoria in 2006, aged 90.

== See also ==
- Australian League of Rights
- Far-right politics in Australia
