= Martin Smyth =

Northern Irish clergyman and politician (1931–2025)

President of the Ulster Unionist Council
- In office 2000–2004
- Preceded by: Josias Cunningham
- Succeeded by: Dennis Rogan, Baron Rogan

Member of Parliament for Belfast South
- In office 4 March 1982 – 11 April 2005
- Preceded by: Robert Bradford
- Succeeded by: Alasdair McDonnell

Member of the Northern Ireland Assembly for Belfast South
- In office 20 October 1982 – 1986
- Preceded by: Assembly re-established
- Succeeded by: Assembly abolished

Member of the Constitutional Convention for Belfast South
- In office 1 May 1975 – 1977
- Preceded by: Convention created
- Succeeded by: Convention dissolved

Personal details
- Born: William Martin Smyth; 15 June 1931 Belfast, Northern Ireland
- Died: 22 August 2025 (aged 94)
- Party: Ulster Unionist Party
- Spouse: Kathleen Jean Johnson (m. 1957; died 2021)
- Children: 3 (Note: 2 deceased)
- Education: Trinity College Dublin
- Occupation: Politician, clergyman

William Martin Smyth (15 June 1931 – 22 August 2025) was a Northern Irish unionist clergyman and politician. An ordained minister of the Presbyterian Church in Ireland, he was Grand master of the Orange Order during much of the Troubles and served as the Ulster Unionist Party (UUP) Member of Parliament (MP) for Belfast South from 1982 to 2005. He was also a former vice-president of the Conservative Monday Club.

Smyth was minister of the Raffrey, County Down, congregation from 1957 to 1963 and of the Alexandra Church, Belfast from 1963 to 1982.

== Early life ==
Smyth was born in Belfast on 15 June 1931. He was brought up in the Donegall Road area of Belfast and attended Methodist College Belfast and Trinity College Dublin.

== Early political career ==
Smyth's appointment as head of the Orange Order was seen at the time as an expression of working-class dissatisfaction against its middle-class leadership. In the 1970s, he was prominent in the Vanguard movement, a faction within the UUP. However, when it split from the UUP to form the Vanguard Unionist Progressive Party, Smyth chose to remain with the UUP. In May 1975, he was elected to the Constitutional Convention for Belfast South, polling more than double the electoral quota.

== Member of Parliament ==
Smyth was selected to fill the vacancy caused by the murder of Robert Bradford, MP for South Belfast. In the 1982 by-election, he received over 17,000 votes and was returned. Later the same year, he was elected to the Northern Ireland Assembly, again polling double the electoral quota. He, along with all other Unionist MPs, resigned his seat in 1985 in protest at the Anglo-Irish Agreement and successfully defended the seat in the subsequent by election. In his paper "A Federated People" (published by the Joint Unionist Working Party in 1987), Smyth proposed a federal United Kingdom with the state governments of England, Scotland, Wales and Northern Ireland. Each would be autonomous and, most significantly, fully independent from the federal parliament and government of the United Kingdom at Westminster.

Smyth was on the parliamentary advisory board of Western Goals, which held a well-attended fringe meeting at the Conservative Party conference in October 1988 on the subject of "International Terrorism – how the West can fight back". He was one of numerous high-profile speakers including General Sir Walter Walker, MP Andrew Hunter, Sir Alfred Sherman and Harvey Ward. Hunter and Ward both gave considerable detail to the meeting concerning "top-level links between the IRA and ANC".

Having won first place in the ballot for Private Members' Bills, Smyth successfully introduced the Disabled Persons (Northern Ireland) Bill to afford disabled people in Northern Ireland analogous rights for disabled people elsewhere in the UK as provided for in the Disabled Persons (Services, Consultation and Representation) Act 1986. Smyth's Bill received Royal Assent in 1989.

== Unsuccessful leadership bid ==
Smyth ran for the leadership of the UUP in 1995 after James Molyneaux stood down but lost to David Trimble. He was opposed to the Good Friday Agreement and was not considered a moderate. He was condemned in 1993 by the Democratic Unionist Party for suggesting that talks with Sinn Féin might be possible. He challenged Trimble for the party leadership in 2000 and was again unsuccessful. He was unsuccessfully challenged for the UUP nomination in Belfast South by Michael McGimpsey before the 2001 general election, and went on to hold the seat. In 2001, he was elected to the position of UUC president. In 2003, he, along with David Burnside and Jeffrey Donaldson, resigned the party whip due to disagreements over the British Irish Declaration of 2003. In January 2004, Smyth and Burnside retook the UUP whip. Later that year he lost the party presidency in the annual election at the Ulster Unionist Council, polling 329 votes to Lord Rogan, who won with 407 votes.

== Later political career ==
In January 2005, Smyth announced he would be stepping down from Westminster at the next election to spend more time with his wife. He ended his House of Commons career in May 2005. During the election Smyth courted controversy when he and former Ulster Unionist leader Molyneaux appeared in a photograph with Democratic Unionist Party candidate Jimmy Spratt on Spratt's election literature. Smyth denied endorsing Spratt stating:

People take pictures of me and they turn up in different places. I didn't sign any form, I didn't go out canvassing, but I was out canvassing with the only two unionist candidates who asked me.

The candidates Smyth did canvass for were David Burnside in South Antrim and Rodney McCune in North Antrim. In the event neither Unionist candidate won in South Belfast, with the seat being taken by the Social Democratic and Labour Party's Alasdair McDonnell amidst a unionist vote split.

== Personal life and death ==
Smyth married Kathleen Jean Johnson in 1957. They had three daughters, one of whom predeceased him. Kathleen died in 2021.

Smyth died on 22 August 2025, at the age of 94.

== Notes ==
Northern Ireland Constitutional Convention
New convention	Member for Belfast South; 1975–1976	Convention dissolved
Parliament of the United Kingdom
Preceded by Robert Bradford	Member of Parliament for Belfast South; 1982–2005	Succeeded by Alasdair McDonnell
Northern Ireland Assembly (1982)
New assembly	MPA for South Belfast; 1982–1986	Assembly abolished
Party political offices
New political party	Deputy Leader of Ulster Vanguard; 1972–1973; Served alongside: Austin Ardill	Succeeded by Ernest Baird and Lindsay Smyth
Preceded by Sir Joe Cunningham	President of the Ulster Unionist Party; 2000–2004	Succeeded by Lord Rogan
Non-profit organization positions
Preceded by John Bryans	Grand Master of the Orange Institution of Ireland; 1971–1996	Succeeded by Robert Saulters
