= Alfredo Cristiani =

President of El Salvador from 1989 to 1994

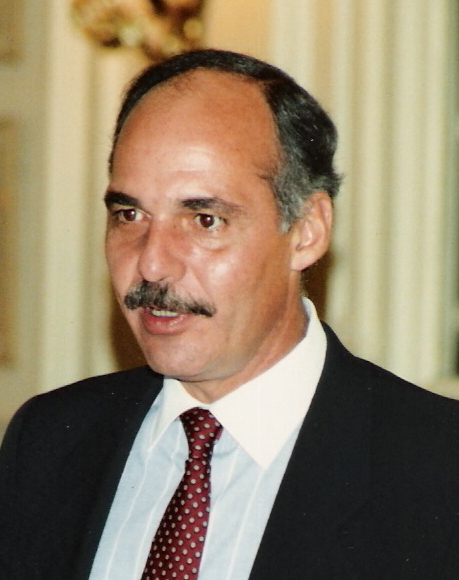
- Cristiani in London, September 1989

37th President of El Salvador
- In office 1 June 1989 – 1 June 1994
- Vice President: José Francisco Merino López
- Preceded by: José Napoleón Duarte
- Succeeded by: Armando Calderón Sol

Personal details
- Born: Alfredo Félix Cristiani Burkard; 22 November 1947 (age 78) San Salvador, El Salvador
- Party: Nationalist Republican Alliance
- Education: Georgetown University
- Profession: politician

Alfredo Félix Cristiani Burkard (born 22 November 1947) is a Salvadoran politician who was the 37th President of El Salvador from 1989 to 1994.

== Life and career ==
Born into a wealthy family in San Salvador, his father Felix Cristiani was an Italian immigrant from Bagnaria, Italy and his mother Margoth Burkard de Cristiani was Salvadoran of Swiss descent. He was educated at the 'Escuela Americana' (American School) in San Salvador and Georgetown University in Washington, D.C., where he graduated with a degree in Business Administration. He returned to El Salvador to work for the family business, which included pharmaceuticals, coffee, cotton and until July 2008 the Semillas Cristiani Burkard (SCB) the Central American Monsanto Company representative, leading corn seed company focused on hybrid corn production.

== Political career ==
He remained generally outside politics until the beginning of the 1980s when the armed conflict in El Salvador reached a critical point. As insurrection became more widespread, he became involved with the Nationalist Republican Alliance (ARENA), which had been founded by School of the Americas trained military intelligence officer Roberto D'Aubuisson. In March 1985 D'Aubuisson resigned after ARENA suffered a defeat in the presidential elections. Cristiani became leader of the party in 1988.

In the local and congressional elections of March 1988, ARENA won 80% of the local votes and 31 of the 60 seats in the Congress; Cristiani won one of the seats.

=== President of El Salvador ===
In the 1989 presidential election, Cristiani was elected President with 53.8% of the vote. His swearing-in marked the beginning of a 20-year period of ARENA presidencies, and also marked only the second time in El Salvador's history that the ruling party peacefully surrendered power to the opposition.

==== Foreign policy ====
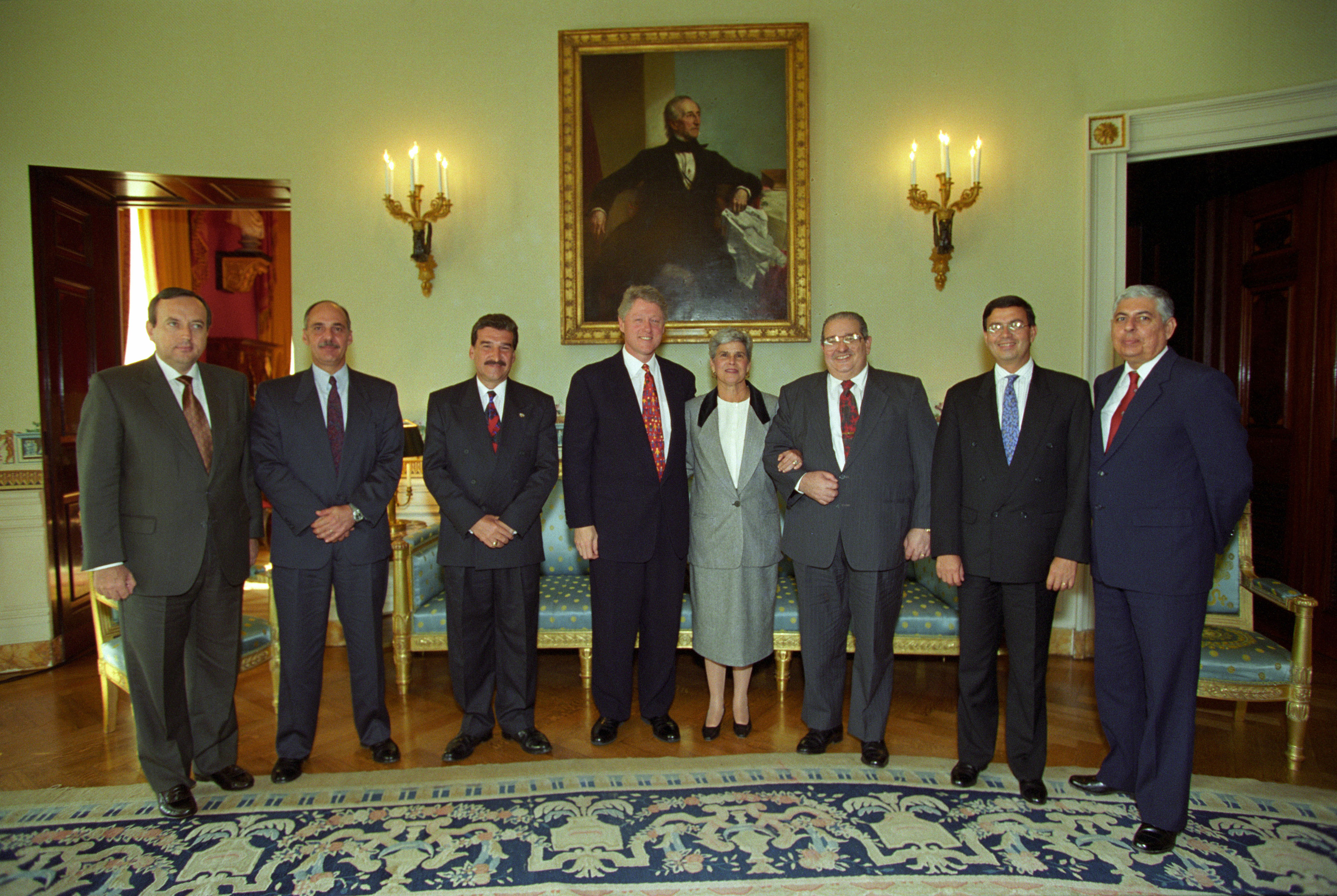
U.S. President Bill Clinton (fourth from left) with Central American leaders in the White House, including Cristiani (second from left), 1993

After becoming President of El Salvador, he, with members of his cabinet, and other colleagues visited Europe and London. He was the principal guest at a dinner held in his honour by the Western Goals Institute at Simpsons-in-the-Strand, London, on 25 September 1989. The guest list included figures such as Sir Alfred Sherman (policy advisor to Margaret Thatcher), Professor Antony Flew, Zigmunt Szkopiak, Denis Walker and Dr Harvey Ward, all of whom were active anti-communists. This visit, along with others that included Spain, Italy, United States, Mexico, Venezuela, Argentina, Chile, Uruguay, and all Central American countries, was part of a diplomatic effort carried out by Cristiani and his delegates in order to find and secure international support for the peace negotiation efforts that were being carried out by his government. Support was actively and officially sanctioned by Venezuela, Mexico, and Spain, who would play an active role, along with the United Nations, in the negotiating process.

==== Domestic policy ====
He was successful in the peace negotiations with the FMLN. The Salvadoran Civil War finally ended on 16 January 1992 with the Chapultepec Peace Accords.

During his term as president, his Minister of the Presidency, the 73-year-old Dr. Jose Antonio Rodriguez Porth, was assassinated. This brought disapproval by the international community against human rights. His murder has been attributed to an urban commando of the FMLN.

==== Economic policy ====
He is also known for having started structural adjustment programs, following a strong neoliberal approach. He initiated the privatization of Salvadoran banks. His wife's family bought a considerable amount of stock of one of El Salvador's largest banks, Banco Cuscatlán, which was later bought by Citibank. He also is responsible for the privatization of Hotel Presidente. His government also supported a unilateral reduction of Salvadoran trade barriers, the introduction of the Value Added Tax, and the elimination of other direct taxes. Despite the fact that the tax revenues were reduced, government expenditures remained high.

== Retirement and return ==
He retired from politics in 1994 when his presidential term ended, and returned as president of the ARENA party in 2009 after the first presidential defeat of ARENA in twenty years.

== Accusations ==
In 2008, two human rights organizations, The Center for Justice and Accountability and The Spanish Association for Human Rights, filed lawsuit in a Spanish court charging Cristiani and fourteen members of the Salvadoran military with direct responsibility for the 1989 murders of Jesuits in El Salvador. Judge Eloy Velasco admitted this lawsuit in 2009, on the basis of the principle of universal justice.

According to former rector José María Tojeira, the Jesuits and Universidad Centroamericana José Simeón Cañas, had nothing to do with this lawsuit.

During the course of the judicial process, recognized Salvadoran personalities travelled to Spain to intercede for president Cristiani and remove him from the list of the accused. One of the members of the delegations was Salvador Samayoa, a former member of FPL (the Marxist–Leninist Popular Liberation Front) and the high command of the FMLN. Another of the members of the delegation was the Salvadoran politician Oscar Santamaría. Both were part of the negotiating commissions of the FMLN and the Salvadoran government that put an end to the Salvadoran Civil War. According to a cable from the US Embassy in El Salvador, both politicians were worried about the implications that the case could have in El Salvador. However, their efforts focused on Cristiani's situation Samayoa was once Ignacio Ellacuría's assistant and close collaborator. Ellacuría was one of the slain scholars during the massacre in which Cristiani was implicated. Ellacuria was allegedly also the main target of the operation. Despite the efforts, an unknown witness in the case confessed his participation in this massacre, implicating the High Command of the Salvadoran Military as well as former Cristiani. Judge Velasco's resolution on the demand, initially included investigations on the 14 implicated members of the Salvadoran Military, excluding the former Salvadoran president, but including the Military High Command, represented by General (then Colonel,) René Emilio Ponce (then the chief of defence of El Salvador). However, the new testimony opened up for the indictment of Cristiani as well. Some of the most compelling evidence that has been available for journalists is notes taken by hand during a meeting of the Salvadoran military High Command. The massacre was allegedly planned during the meeting, and both the High Command and the country's executive, were probably aware, if not directly involved, of the planning meetings. Declassified documents by the CIA have recently shed new light on this case. They indicate that the CIA had for many years known of the Salvadoran government's plans to murder the Jesuits. The court found 20 members of the Salvadoran military guilty on the counts of murder, terrorism, and crimes against humanity. Together, the 20 Salvadorans could serve up to 270 years in a Spanish prison. However, the court did not have enough evidence to convict Cristiani for encouraging the crime. The court established that the military executed the Jesuits because they were strong advocates of a peaceful solution to the civil war. Ellacuria was considered an obstacle to the military victory over FMLN because of his strong influence for peace negotiations.

In October 2021, his name was mentioned in the Pandora Papers. He had created at least 16 offshore companies in the year following his departure from power.

In June 2023, Cristiani's properties were raided and seized by the office of the attorney general as a part of a "war on corruption".

== Youth Penal Code ==
The National Assembly proposed a penal code specific for the youth, and it was approved during President Cristiani's term. His minister of justice was Rene Hernandez. The law came into effect on 6 May 1995 and protects children from being tried as adults. Crimes committed by young minors are not longer judged under the regular Penal Code but under the Youth Penal Code, which applies to minors between the ages of 12 and 16 years. The maximum term for a minor who commits a crime was originally only 5 years, but it has recently been changed to 7 years.

Political offices
Preceded by José Napoleón Duarte	President of El Salvador; 1989–1994	Succeeded by Armando Calderón
