= First Szczepanik cabinet =

The first cabinet of Edward Szczepanik (pierwszy rząd Edwarda Szczepanika) was the second-to-last of the cabinets of the Polish government-in-exile, preceding the cabinet of Kazimierz Sabbat (who became President) and second Szczepanik cabinet.

- Prime Minister: Edward Szczepanik
- Minister of Education: Czesław Czapliński
- Minister of the Treasury: Stanisław Borczyk
- Minister of the Emigrees Affairs: Zbigniew Scholtz
- Minister of Home Affairs: Ryszard Kaczorowski
- Minister of the Military Affairs: Lt. Col. Jerzy Morawicz
- Minister of Foreign Affairs: Zygmunt Szkopiak
- Minister of Justice: Stanisław Wiszniewski
- Minister of Information: Andrzej Czyżewski
- Minister of the Ordered Matters: Tadeusz Drzewiecki
- Minister of the Relations with USSR-occupied nations: Aleksander Snastin
- Secretary of the Council of Ministers: Jerzy Zaleski
