= Zygmunt Szkopiak =

Polish scientist, diplomat and historian

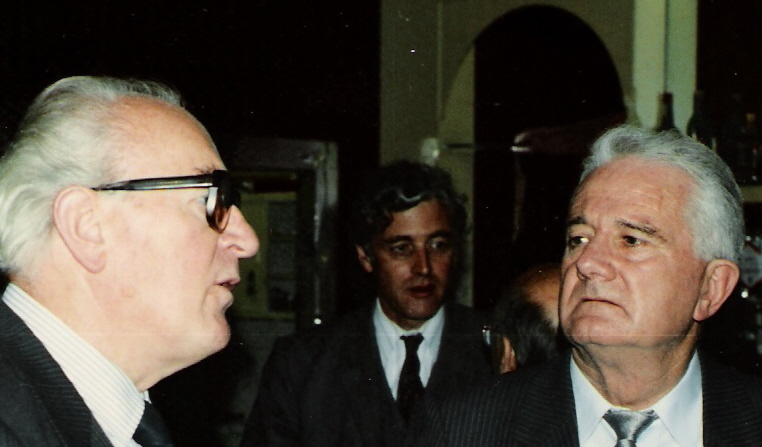
Dr. Szkopiak, left, with Lord Sudeley and Dr. Harvey Ward

Dr. Zygmunt Szkopiak (12 December 1926 – 21 October 2002) was a Polish scientist, diplomat, and historian who from 1986 until its dissolution in 1990, served as the last Minister of Foreign Affairs in the London-based Polish government-in-exile.

Born in Morzewiec, a small village in north-central Poland, 14 km from the country's 8th largest city, Bydgoszcz, Zygmunt Szkopiak was 12 at the time of the September 1939 German invasion of Poland. The Szkopiak family, which included his parents and siblings, was deported to Austria where they spent the war toiling as agricultural slave laborers. Liberated by the British Eighth Army, he and his family received refugee status and were sent to England where he entered the Polish College of the University of London at Battersea, received a doctorate in the physics of metallurgy and joined the staff of Battersea College of Advanced Technology which, in 1968, became the University of Surrey. He authored numerous scientific papers in his research specialties which centered upon stress relaxation and internal friction, and served as editor of a Polish scientific journal and a visiting professor abroad. He also met and married Lucia, like himself, a Polish refugee, whose father was one of the victims of the Katyn Massacre and who reached England via Belarus, the Middle East and South Africa.

Szkopiak was a member of the co-ordinating committee of the European Freedom Campaign group, which was established in London at an Inaugural Rally at Westminster Central Hall on 10 December 1988 and consisted almost exclusively of representatives from countries behind the Iron Curtain. On 17 August 1989, The Daily Telegraph published a letter, which he signed as Minister of Foreign Affairs, explaining that "for the past 44 years we have continued as the legitimate government" and setting forth "the terms under which the Polish Government-in-Exile would cease to function". An ardent anti-communist he was a supporter of the Western Goals Institute and was present at their dinner at Simpson's-in-the-Strand on 25 September 1989 for El Salvador's President, Alfredo Cristiani, and his inner cabinet.

Starting in 1984, he held the title of professor at Polish University Abroad and, from 1983 to 1991, was a Christian Democratic member of the exile-based National Council of Poland. His final official post, from 1991 to 1997, was as president of the Federation of Poles in Great Britain.

Zygmunt Szkopiak died in London at age 75.
