= Antony Flew =

English analytic and evidentialist philosopher (1923–2010)

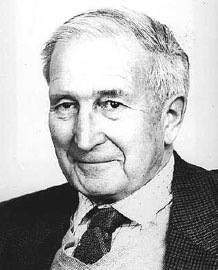
- Portrait of Flew
- Born: Antony Garrard Newton Flew; 11 February 1923; London, England
- Died: 8 April 2010 (aged 87); Reading, Berkshire, England

Education
- Education: SOAS University of London; St John's College, Oxford (MA)
- Academic advisor: Gilbert Ryle

Philosophical work
- Era: 20th-century philosophy
- Region: Western philosophy
- School: Analytic; Evidentialism; Libertarianism
- Institutions: Christ Church, Oxford; University of Aberdeen; Keele University; University of Reading; York University
- Notable students: Michael Dummett
- Main interests: Philosophy of religion
- Notable ideas: No true Scotsman; Presumption of atheism Negative and positive atheism Subject/motive shift

Antony Garrard Newton Flew (/fluː/; 11 February 1923 – 8 April 2010) was an English philosopher. Belonging to the analytic and evidentialist schools of thought, Flew worked on the philosophy of religion. During the course of his career he taught philosophy at the universities of Oxford, Aberdeen, Keele, and Reading in the United Kingdom, and at York University in Toronto, Canada.

Flew was born in London. For much of his career Flew was an advocate of atheism, claiming that one should presuppose atheism until empirical evidence suggesting the existence of a God surfaces. He also criticised the idea of life after death, the free will defence to the problem of evil, and the meaningfulness of the concept of God. In 2003, he was one of the signatories of the Humanist Manifesto III. He also developed the No true Scotsman fallacy, and debated retrocausality with Michael Dummett.

However, in 2004 he changed his position, and stated that he now believed in the existence of an intelligent designer of the universe, shocking colleagues and fellow atheists. In order to further clarify his personal conception of God, Flew openly made an allegiance to Deism, more specifically a belief in the Aristotelian God, a Divine Watchmaker removed from human affairs but responsible for the intricate workings of the universe, and dismissed on many occasions a hypothetical conversion to Christianity, Islam, or any other religion. He stated that in keeping his lifelong commitment to go where the evidence leads, he now believed in the existence of a God.

In 2007 a book outlining his reasons for changing his position, There is a God: How the World's Most Notorious Atheist Changed His Mind, was written by Flew in collaboration with Roy Abraham Varghese, and included a chapter on the resurrection of Jesus. Mark Oppenheimer alleged that Flew's intellect had declined due to senility, and that the book was primarily the work of Varghese; Flew himself specifically denied this, stating that the book represented his views, although he acknowledged that due to his age Varghese had done most of the actual work of writing the book.

== Life and career ==
Antony Garrard Newton Flew was born in London on 11 February 1923, the son of Methodist minister and theologian Robert Newton Flew (1886–1962) and his wife Winifred née Garrard (1887–1982). He was educated at St Faith's School, Cambridge followed by Kingswood School, Bath. He is said to have concluded by the age of 15 that there was no God. During the Second World War he studied Japanese at the School of Oriental and African Studies, University of London, and was a Royal Air Force intelligence officer. After a period with the Inter-Services Topographical Department in Oxford, he was posted to Bletchley Park in June 1944.

In the post-war era, Flew achieved a first class degree in Literae Humaniores at St John's College, Oxford (1947). He also won the John Locke Scholarship in Mental Philosophy in the following year. Flew was a graduate student of Gilbert Ryle, prominent in ordinary language philosophy. Both Flew and Ryle were among many Oxford philosophers fiercely criticised in Ernest Gellner's book Words and Things (1959). A 1954 debate with Michael Dummett over backward causation was an early highlight in Flew's career.

For a year, 1949–1950, Flew was a lecturer in philosophy at Christ Church, Oxford. From 1950 to 1954 he was a lecturer at the University of Aberdeen, and from 1954 to 1971 he was a professor of philosophy at the University of Keele. He held a professorship at the University of Calgary, 1972–1973. Between 1973 and 1983 he was professor of philosophy at the University of Reading. At this time, he developed one of his most famous arguments, the No true Scotsman fallacy in his 1975 book, Thinking About Thinking. Upon his retirement, Flew took up a half-time post for a few years at York University in Toronto, Canada.

Politically, Flew was a right-wing libertarian-leaning conservative who opposed immigration, egalitarianism, and the European Union, and wrote articles for The Journal of Libertarian Studies. His name appears on letterheads into 1992 as a vice-president of the Conservative Monday Club, and he held the same position in the Western Goals Institute. He was one of the signatories to a letter in The Times along with Lord Sudeley, Sir Alfred Sherman, and Dr. Harvey Ward, on behalf of the institute, "applauding Alfredo Cristiani's statesmanship" and calling for his government's success in defeating the Cuban and Nicaraguan-backed communist FMLN in El Salvador. In 1999 he wrote the foreword to a publication of the British far-right think tank Bloomsbury Forum, Standard Bearers: British Roots of the New Right. In political philosophy, the main interest of Flew was in opposing the concept of social justice, i.e. the idea that income and wealth should be redistributed among the population in accordance with a principle of economic equality.

While an undergraduate, Flew attended the weekly meetings of C. S. Lewis' Socratic Club fairly regularly. Although he found Lewis to be "an eminently reasonable man" and "by far the most powerful Christian apologists for the sixty or more years following his founding of that club", he was not persuaded by Lewis' argument from morality as found in Mere Christianity (1952). Flew also criticised several of the other philosophical arguments for God's existence. He concluded that the ontological argument in particular failed because it is based on the premise that the concept of Being can be derived from the concept of Goodness. Only the scientific forms of the teleological argument ultimately impressed Flew as decisive.

During the time of his involvement in the Socratic Club, Flew also wrote the article Theology and Falsification, which argued that claims about the existence of a God were merely vacuous since they couldn't be falsified, therefore it was impossible to test these claims for truth or falsehood. Flew was also critical of the idea of life after death and the free will defence to the problem of evil. In 1998, he debated Christian apologist and philosopher William Lane Craig over the existence of God.

Flew married on 28 June 1952. He had two daughters. Flew died on 8 April 2010, while nursed in an extended care facility in Reading, England, suffering from dementia.

== Atheism and Deism ==
=== The Presumption of Atheism ===
Antony Flew's most influential professional works was his 1976 The Presumption of Atheism in which Flew forwarded the proposition that the question of God's existence should begin with the presupposition of atheism until empirical evidence for the existence of a God surfaces. He also criticised the idea of life after death, the free will defence to the problem of evil, and the meaningfulness of the concept of God.

"What I want to examine is the contention that the debate about the existence of God should properly begin from the presumption of atheism, that the onus of proof must lie upon the theist. The word 'atheism', however, has in this contention to be construed unusually. Whereas nowadays the usual meaning of 'atheist' in English is 'someone who asserts that there is no such being as God', I want the word to be understood not positively but negatively...in this interpretation an atheist becomes: not someone who positively asserts the non-existence of God; but someone who is simply not a theist. The introduction of this new interpretation of the word 'atheism' may appear to be a piece of perverse Humpty-Dumptyism, going arbitrarily against established common usage. 'Whyever', it could be asked, don't you make it not the presumption of atheism but the presumption of agnosticism?"

Flew's proposal to change his profession's use of the term "atheism" saw limited acceptance in the 20th century, but in the early 21st century Flew's definition of the negative sense of atheism came to be forwarded more commonly by people who identify as atheists. According to Christian apologist and philosopher William Lane Craig's 2007 assessment regarding the impact of Flew's proposed concept of negative atheism, the presumption of atheism has become "one of the most commonly proffered justifications of atheism." According to the BBC journalist William Crawley 2010's analysis: "The Presumption of Atheism (1976) made the case, now followed by today's new atheism, that atheism should be the ... default position". In recent debates, atheists often forward The Presumption of Atheism referring to atheism as the "default position", "no burden of proof", or asserting that the burden of proof rests solely on the theists who claim that God exists.

=== Revised views ===
==== Conversion to Deism ====
On several occasions, starting in 2001, rumors circulated claiming that Flew had converted from atheism to Deism; Flew denied these rumours on the Secular Web website.

In January 2004, Flew and Gary Habermas, his friend and philosophical adversary, took part in and conducted a dialogue on the resurrection at California Polytechnic State University – San Luis Obispo. While Flew did not change his position at that time, he concluded that certain philosophical and scientific considerations were causing him to do some serious rethinking. He characterized his position as that of atheism standing in tension with several huge question marks.

In a 2004 interview (published 9 December), Flew, then 81 years old, stated that he now believed in the existence of an intelligent designer of the universe, and explained that he had become a Deist. In the article, Flew stated that he had renounced his long-standing espousal of atheism. In order to further clarify his personal conception of God, Flew openly made an allegiance to Deism, more specifically a belief in the Aristotelian God, a Divine Watchmaker removed from human affairs but responsible for the intricate workings of the universe, and dismissed on many occasions a hypothetical conversion to Christianity, Islam, or any other religion. He stated that in keeping his lifelong commitment to go where the evidence leads, he now believed in the existence of a God.

During that same 2004 interview, Flew explicitly rejected the idea of life after death, of God as the source of good (he explicitly stated that God has created "a lot of" evil), and of the resurrection of Jesus as a historical fact, although he had allowed a short chapter arguing in favor of his resurrection to be added into his latest book. Flew was particularly hostile towards Islam, and said it is "best described in a Marxian way as the uniting and justifying ideology of Arab imperialism." In a December 2004 interview, he declared: "I'm thinking of a God very different from the God of the Christian and far and away from the God of Islam, because both are depicted as omnipotent Oriental despots, cosmic Saddam Husseins".

==== Controversy over his position ====
In October 2004 (before the December publication of the Flew–Habermas interview), in a letter written to the internet atheist advocate Richard Carrier of the Secular Web, Flew stated that he was a Deist, and wrote "I think we need here a fundamental distinction between the God of Aristotle or Spinoza and the Gods of the Christian and the Islamic Revelations." Flew also said: "My one and only piece of relevant evidence [for an Aristotelian God] is the apparent impossibility of providing a naturalistic theory of the origin from DNA of the first reproducing species... [In fact] the only reason which I have for beginning to think of believing in a First Cause god is the impossibility of providing a naturalistic account of the origin of the first reproducing organisms."

When asked in December 2004 by Duncan Crary of Humanist Network News if he still stood by the argument presented in The Presumption of Atheism, Flew replied that he did and reaffirmed his position as Deist: "I'm quite happy to believe in an inoffensive inactive god." When asked by Crary whether or not he has kept up with the most recent science and theology, he responded with "Certainly not," stating that there is simply too much to keep up with. Flew also denied that there was any truth to the rumours of 2001 and 2003 that he had converted to Christianity.

His 2007 book There is a God revisited the question, however, and questioned contemporary models: "the latest work I have seen shows that the present physical universe gives too little time for these theories of abiogenesis to get the job done." He added: "The philosophical question that has not been answered in origin-of-life studies is this: How can a universe of mindless matter produce beings with intrinsic ends, self-replication capabilities, and 'coded chemistry'? Here we are not dealing with biology, but an entirely different category of problem".

However, in spring 2005 when atheist Raymond Bradley, emeritus professor of philosophy at Simon Fraser University and a member of the editorial board of The Open Society journal, wrote an open letter to Flew accusing him of not "check[ing] the veracity of Gerald Schroeder's claims before swallowing them whole," Flew responded strongly to that charge in a letter published in the same journal in summer 2006, describing the content of Bradley's letter "extraordinarily offensive" and the accusation made by him as an "egregiously offensive charge"; he also implied that Bradley was a "secularist bigot," and suggested that he should follow Socrates' advice (as scripted in Plato's Republic) of "follow[ing] the argument wherever it leads." Other prominent atheists, such as Richard Dawkins, suggested Flew's deism was a form of God of the gaps.

Flew said in December 2004:

I have been denounced by my fellow unbelievers for stupidity, betrayal, senility and everything you can think of and none of them have read a word that I have ever written.

==== Restatement of position ====
A letter on evolution and theology which Flew published in the August/September 2004 issue of Philosophy Now magazine closed with, "Anyone who should happen to want to know what I myself now believe will have to wait until the publication, promised for early 2005, by Prometheus of Amherst, NY of the final edition of my God and Philosophy with a new introduction of it as 'an historical relic'."

The preface of God and Philosophy states that the publisher and Flew went through a total of four versions before coming up with one that satisfied them both. The introduction raises ten matters that came about since the original 1966 edition. Flew states that any book to follow God and Philosophy will have to take into account these ideas when considering the philosophical case for the existence of God:

1. A novel definition of "God" by Richard Swinburne
2. The case for the existence of the Christian God by Swinburne in the book Is There a God?
3. The Church of England's change in doctrine on the eternal punishment of Hell
4. The question of whether there was only one Big Bang and if time began with it
5. The question of multiple universes
6. The fine-tuning argument
7. The question of whether there is a naturalistic account for the development of living matter from non-living matter
8. The question of whether there is a naturalistic account for non-reproducing living matter developing into a living creature capable of reproduction
9. The concept of an Intelligent Orderer as explained in the book The Wonder of the World: A Journey from Modern Science to the Mind of God by Roy Abraham Varghese
10. An extension of an Aristotelian/Deist concept of God that can be reached through natural theology, which was developed by David Conway.

In an interview with Joan Bakewell for BBC Radio 4 in March 2005, Flew rejected the fine-tuning argument as a conclusive proof: "I don't think it proves anything but that it is entirely reasonable for people who already have a belief in a creating God to regard this as confirming evidence. And it's a point of argument which I think is very important – to see that what is reasonable for people to do in the face of new evidence depends on what they previously had good reason to believe." He also said it appeared that there had been progress made regarding the naturalistic origins of DNA. However, he restated his deism, with the usual provisos that his God is not the God of any of the revealed religions. In the same interview, Flew was asked whether he was retracting belief in an Aristotelian God, but answered no.

One month later, Flew told Christianity Today that although he was not on the road to becoming a convert to Christianity, he reaffirmed his belief in Deism: "Since the beginning of my philosophical life I have followed the policy of Plato's Socrates: We must follow the argument wherever it leads."

In late 2006, Flew joined 11 other academics in urging the British government to teach intelligent design in the state schools.

In 2007, in an interview with Benjamin Wiker, Flew said again that his deism was the result of his "growing empathy with the insight of Einstein and other noted scientists that there had to be an Intelligence behind the integrated complexity of the physical Universe" and "my own insight that the integrated complexity of life itself – which is far more complex than the physical Universe – can only be explained in terms of an Intelligent Source." He also restated that he was not a Christian theist.

=== Book with Varghese and authorship controversy ===
In 2007, Flew published a book titled There is a God, which was listed as having Roy Abraham Varghese as its co-author. Shortly after the book was released, The New York Times Magazine published an article by historian of religion Mark Oppenheimer, who stated that Varghese had been almost entirely responsible for writing the book, and that Flew was in a serious state of mental decline, having great difficulty remembering key figures, ideas, and events relating to the debate covered in the book. His book praises several philosophers (like Brian Leftow, John Leslie and Paul Davies), but Flew failed to remember their work during Oppenheimer's interview.

A further article by Anthony Gottlieb noted a strong difference in style between the passages giving Flew's biography, and those laying out the case for a god, the latter including Americanisms such as "beverages", "vacation" and "candy". He came to the same conclusion as Oppenheimer, and stated that "Far from strengthening the case for the existence of God, [the book] rather weakens the case for the existence of Antony Flew". Varghese replied with a letter disputing this view.

Flew later released a statement through his publisher stating:

I have rebutted these criticisms in the following statement: My name is on the book and it represents exactly my opinions. I would not have a book issued in my name that I do not 100 percent agree with. I needed someone to do the actual writing because I'm 84 and that was Roy Varghese's role. The idea that someone manipulated me because I'm old is exactly wrong. I may be old but it is hard to manipulate me. This is my book and it represents my thinking.

An audio commentary by William Lane Craig concurs with this position, but Richard Carrier disputed this view. In June 2008, Flew stated his position once again, in a letter to a fellow of the Universities and Colleges Christian Fellowship.

Christian writer Regis Nicoll claims that "Moreover, in a signed, handwritten letter (a copy of which I now have) sent to Roy Varghese, the legendary philosopher reaffirmed his conversion while criticising Oppenheimer for drawing attention away from the book’s central argument: the collapse of rationalism." He argues that "Even Mark Oppenheimer described the ex-atheist 'flaunt[ing] his allegiance to deism' in May 2006 to a Christian audience at Biola University." Perhaps most definitively, Christian apologist Anthony Horvath corresponded with Antony Flew before it was publicly known there would even be a book. In 2010, he published his letters. The letters contain Flew's description of the outline of the book, his Deism in the pattern of Einstein's, and his high praise of N.T. Wright's arguments for Christianity. All of these elements are present in the book.

== Awards ==
Flew was awarded the Schlarbaum Prize by the Ludwig von Mises Institute for his "outstanding lifetime achievement in the cause of liberty." Upon acceptance of the award in Auburn, Alabama, in September 2001, Flew delivered an address entitled "Locke versus Rawls on Equality." Of his choice of topics, he stated "I am the first Englishman and the first professional philosopher to receive the Schlarbaum Prize. So it seems appropriate to begin by talking about the greatest English philosopher, John Locke."

On 11 May 2006, Antony Flew accepted the second "Phillip E. Johnson Award for Liberty and Truth" from Biola University. The award, named for its first recipient, was given to Flew "for his lifelong commitment to free and open inquiry and to standing fast against intolerant assaults on freedom of thought and expression". When informed of his award, Flew remarked, "In light of my work and publications in this area and the criticism I’ve received for changing my position, I appreciate receiving this award".

He was an honorary associate of the New Zealand Association of Rationalists and Humanists and a fellow of the Committee for Skeptical Inquiry. In 1985, Flew was awarded the In Praise of Reason Award the highest honor the Committee for Skeptical Inquiry awards. The award was presented by Chairman Paul Kurtz in London "'[I]n recognition of his long-standing contributions to the use of methods of critical inquiry, scientific evidence, and reason in evaluating claims to knowledge and solving social problems."

== Works ==
- A New Approach to Psychical Research (1953)
- New Essays in Philosophical Theology (1955) editor with Alasdair MacIntyre
- Essays in Conceptual Analysis (1956)
- Hume's Philosophy of Belief (1961)
- Logic And Language (1961) editor
- God and Philosophy (1966)
- Logic & Language (1966) Second series
- Evolutionary Ethics (1967)
- An Introduction to Western Philosophy: Ideas and Argument from Plato to Sartre (1971)
- Body, Mind and Death (1973)
- Crime or Disease (1973)
- Thinking About Thinking (1975)
- Sociology, Equality and Education: Philosophical Essays in Defence of A Variety of Differences (1976)
- The Warren-Flew Debate on the existence of God (1976)
- Thinking Straight (1977) ISBN 978-0879750886
- A Dictionary of Philosophy (1979) editor, later edition with Stephen Priest
- Philosophy, an Introduction (1979)
- Libertarians versus Egalitarians (c. 1980) pamphlet
- The Politics of Procrustes: contradictions of enforced equality (1981)
- Darwinian Evolution (1984)
- God, Freedom and Immortality: A Critical Analysis (reprint ed.), 1984 [The Presumption of Atheism, 1976], archived from the original on 12 October 2005
- Examination not Attempted in Right Ahead, newspaper of the Conservative Monday Club, Conservative Party Conference edition, October 1985
- God: A Critical Inquiry (1986) – reprint of God and Philosophy (1966) with new introduction
- David Hume: Philosopher of Moral Science (1986) Oxford: Basil Blackwell
- Agency and Necessity (1987) series = Great Debates in Philosophy id=with Godfrey Norman Agmondis Vesey
- Did Jesus Rise From the Dead? The Resurrection Debate (1987) with Gary Habermas
- Power to the Parents: Reversing Educational Decline (1987)
- The Logic of Mortality (1987)
- Duncan, Ronald; Wilson, Colin (1987), "Prophesy or Philosophy? Historicism or History?", Marx Refuted, Ashgrove Press, ISBN 978-0906798713, with Ronald Duncan & Colin Wilson (eds.)
- Readings in the Philosophical Problems of Parapsychology (1987) editor
- God, A Critical Inquiry (1988)
- Does God Exist?: A Believer and an Atheist Debate (1991) with Terry L. Miethe
- A Future for Anti-Racism? (Social Affairs Unit 1992) pamphlet
- Flew, Antony (1993), Atheistic Humanism, Prometheus Books, ISBN 978-0879758479
- Thinking About Social Thinking (1995)
- Philosophical Essays (1998) edited by John Shosky
- Education for Citizenship, Studies in Education, Institute of Economic Affairs, 2000
- Merely Mortal? (2000)
- Equality in Liberty and Justice (2001) Transaction Publishers
- Does God Exist: The Craig-Flew Debate (2003) with William Lane Craig ISBN 978-0754631903
- Social Life and Moral Judgment (2003)
- God and Philosophy (2005) – another reprint of God and Philosophy (1966) with another new introduction
- There is a God: How the World's Most Notorious Atheist Changed His Mind (2007) with Roy Abraham Varghese ISBN 978-0061335297
- Encyclopedia article (2008). "Humanism". In Hamowy, Ronald (ed.). The Encyclopedia of Libertarianism. Thousand Oaks, CA: Sage; Cato Institute. pp. 228–229. doi:10.4135/9781412965811. ISBN 978-1412965804.
- Encyclopedia article (2008). "Milton, John (1608–1674)". In Hamowy, Ronald (ed.). The Encyclopedia of Libertarianism. Thousand Oaks, CA: Sage; Cato Institute. pp. 331–332. ISBN 978-1412965804.
