= Alfred Sherman =

English writer, journalist and political adviser (1919–2006)

Sir Alfred Sherman (10 November 1919 – 26 August 2006) was an English writer, journalist, and political analyst. Described by a long-time associate as "a brilliant polymath, a consummate homo politicus, and one of the last true witnesses to the 20th century", he was a Communist volunteer in the Spanish Civil War but later changed his views completely and became an adviser to Margaret Thatcher.

== Personal life ==
Sherman was born in Hackney, London, to Jewish immigrants from Russia, Jacob Vladimir and Eva Sherman. His early years were spent in grinding poverty; as a child he suffered from rickets. He attended Hackney Downs County Secondary School, which was then a grammar school and regarded as a flagship of opportunity. He went on to Chelsea Polytechnic, where he studied science. He married Zahava Zazi née Levin in 1958, and they had one son, Gideon. After her death from cancer in 1993 he married Lady Angela Sherman in 2001.

== Young communist ==
Alfred Sherman joined the Communist Party as a teenager and abandoned his studies at Chelsea Polytechnic at the age of 17, later explaining, "to be a Jew in 1930s Britain was to be alienated. The world proletariat offered us a home." He then volunteered to fight for the Major Attlee Battalion of the International Brigades during the Spanish Civil War, 1937–38, where he was taken prisoner and repatriated to Britain. After returning home, he worked in a London electrical factory.

Between 1939 and 1945, he served in the Middle East in the Field Security and Occupied Enemy Territory Administration. After the war, in the summer of 1948 he was expelled from the Communist Party for "Titoist deviationism" and subsequently spent some time in Yugoslavia as a volunteer in a "youth work brigade".

== Political changes ==
After graduating from the London School of Economics (LSE) in 1950, he returned to Belgrade as a correspondent for The Observer. Already fluent in the language known as Serbo-Croatian at that time, he acquired an encyclopaedic knowledge of the history, culture and politics of the South Slavs. He also developed a lifelong affinity for the Serbs, comparable to that of Dame Rebecca West. That affinity was rekindled in the 1990s, when Sherman became a leading critic of the American policy in the former Yugoslavia.

During a subsequent protracted stay in Israel in the late 1950s Sherman was a member of the economic advisory staff of the Israeli government and had a close relationship with David Ben-Gurion. After returning to London, in 1963, he joined the Jewish Chronicle as a leader writer, later writing for The Daily Telegraph from 1965 (leader writer from 1977). About 1970 he joined the Conservative Party and the following year was elected as a councillor for the Royal Borough of Kensington and Chelsea (1971–78).

== Relationship with Thatcher ==
Sherman was critical of Edward Heath's Conservative government because of its public spending and its failure to implement free market policies. In 1974 he co-founded the Centre for Policy Studies with Sir Keith Joseph and Margaret Thatcher. Sherman was subsequently Director of the CPS and a member of the Conservative Philosophy Group. The CPS was the real launching pad for Margaret Thatcher, gradually transforming her from the untried party leader of 1974 into a prime-minister-in-waiting. More than any one man, Sherman provided her with the strategy for capturing the leadership of the Party and winning the general election of 1979. However he was undisciplined when it came to the media and an early display of his outspoken racism was when he told the Soviet newspaper Pravda, in 1974: "As for the lumpen proletariat, coloured people and the Irish, let's face it, the only way to hold them in check is to have enough well-armed and properly trained police." Eventually he upset so many people at the CPS that its chairman, Hugh Thomas, decided that Sherman was "impossible to work with: he has to go", and expelled him in 1983.

In her memoirs, Thatcher herself paid tribute to Sherman's "brilliance", the "force and clarity of his mind", his "breadth of reading and his skills as a ruthless polemicist". She credits him with a central role in her achievements, especially as Leader of the Opposition but also after she became Prime Minister: in July 2005 she declared, "We could have never defeated socialism if it hadn't been for Sir Alfred". But his unwillingness to make compromises with the establishmentarian consensus never enabled him to fit into the clubbable world of British politics.

By 1982, the latent strains in his relationship with Mrs Thatcher became fully apparent. She complained that he was dismissive of the obstacles she was encountering in dismantling the legacy of the post-war consensus, while he berated her for betraying the promise of her early years. After his exclusion from her inner circle she nevertheless continued to regard him with "exasperated affection", and rewarded him with a knighthood in 1983. Yet in the 1990s he said of her, "Lady Thatcher is great theatre as long as someone else is writing her lines; she hasn't got a clue". In July 2005 they were reunited at a reception marking the publication of Sherman's last book with a revealing title, Paradoxes of Power: Reflections on the Thatcher Interlude.

== Western Goals ==
From about 1986, he and his son Gideon were members of Western Goals (UK), Gideon serving on the Directorate. Sir Alfred was one of the signatories to a letter in The Times, along with Lord Sudeley, Professor Antony Flew and Dr. Harvey Ward, on behalf of the institute, "applauding El Salvador's President Alfredo Cristiani's statesmanship" and calling for his government's success in defeating Cuban and Nicaraguan-backed communist FMLN terrorists.

== Views on economists ==
"When you get a loss of faith, say if bishops cease to believe in God, they go in for socialism or sodomy. But an economist who's agnostic about economics is unemployable, and therefore they say, "We know if you do this and if you do that.." And the economists will argue with each other, but none of them will ever question whether economics is as scientific as it claims."

== Views on Yugoslav Wars ==
In the last 15 years of his life, Sherman was an outspoken critic of western policy in the former Yugoslavia. In 1994 he co-founded The Lord Byron Foundation for Balkan Studies as a research institute. In Sherman's words, it was "designed to correct the current trend of public commentary, which tends, systematically, not to understand events but to construct a propagandistic version of Balkan rivalries, designed to facilitate the involvement of outside powers".

In 1992, writing in London's Jewish Chronicle, Sherman warned against "the lapse of logic" in confusing the Bosnian Muslims with the European Jewry under Hitler.

"It does us no good to claim a locus standi in every conflict be equating it with the Holocaust", he wrote, "or when third parties in their own interests take the name of our martyrs in vain; Bosnia is not occupied Europe; the Muslims are not the Jews; the Serbs did not begin the civil war, but are predictably responding to a real threat. ... Since 1990, the independent Croatian leadership—with its extreme chauvinist and clericalist colouring—and the Bosnian Muslim leadership—seeking, in its Islamic fundamentalist programme, to put the clock back to Ottoman days—have threatened to turn the Serbs back into persecuted minorities".

By the end of the decade, Sherman saw the U.S. policy in the former Yugoslavia as inseparable from the drive for global hegemony. In 1997, he noted that the American century began with the Spanish–American War, and that it was ending with American penetration of ex-Yugoslavia. But in contrast to the Spanish–American War, he argued, U.S. intervention there's had no clear strategic aim, but is allegedly a moral crusade on behalf of the "international community":

"This begs many questions. First, is there such a thing as 'the international community'? Do people in China, which accounts for a fifth of the world's population, and the Buddhists, who account for another fifth—among others—really want the U.S. and its client states to bomb the Serbs or Iraqis? And who exactly, and when, deputed the U.S. to act on behalf of this 'world community'? ... Secondly, can the blunt weapon of force, of whose use U.S. Secretary of State Madeleine Albright boasted, balance conflicting and competing ethnic, religious, economic and political interactions over this wide and conflictive region? Can the U.S. raise the expectations of the Albanians and Slav Moslems without affronting Macedonians, Greeks, Italians, Bulgars and Croats, as well as Serbs? ... Thirdly, can force be a substitute for policy? It was a wise German who said that you can do anything with bayonets except sit on them. The same goes for gunships, the modern equivalent of gunboat diplomacy. Bomb and rocket once, and it has an effect. But if the victim survives, the second bout is less effective, because the victim is learning to cope."

Well before the 11 September attacks and the Iraq War, Sherman argued that Washington had "set up the cornerstone of a European "Islamistan" in Bosnia and a Greater Albania, thus paving the way for further three-sided conflict between Moslems, Serbs and Croats in a bellum omnium contra omnes. ... Far from creating a new status quo it has simply intensified instability." The U.S. may succeed in establishing its hegemony, in the former Yugoslavia and elsewhere, "but it will also inherit long-standing ethno-religious conflicts and border disputes without the means for settling them." As he wrote in May 2000,

"The power and the prestige of America is in the hands of people who will not resist the temptation to invent new missions, lay down new embargoes, throw new bombs, and fabricate new courts. For the time being, they control the United Nations, the World Bank, most of the world's high-tech weapons, and the vast majority of the satellites that watch us from every quadrant of the skies. This is the opportunity they sense, and we must ask what ambitions they will declare next. ... Instead of rediscovering the virtues of traditionally defined, enlightened self-interest in the aftermath of its hands down cold war victory, America's foreign policy elites are more intoxicated than ever by their own concoction of benevolent global hegemony and indispensable power.

== Publications ==
- Sherman, Sir Alfred, The Paradoxes of Power: Reflections on the Thatcher Interlude, (Imprint Academic, 2005).
