= Pierre Ceyrac =

French politician (1946–2018)

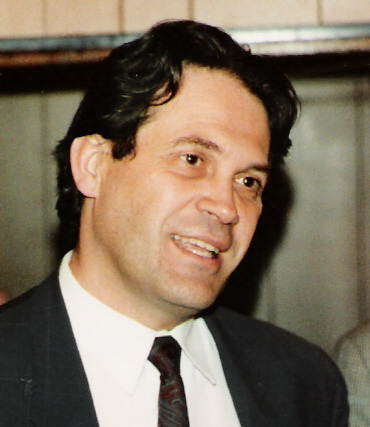
- Ceyrac speaking in 1989
- Born: 18 September 1946; Douai, Nord, France
- Died: 21 April 2018 (aged 71); Douai, Nord, France
- Occupation: Politician
- Political party: Front National

Pierre Ceyrac (18 September 1946 – 21 April 2018) was a French politician who served the French Front National Party first as a Deputy to the National Assembly of France (1986–1988), and then as a Member of the European Parliament (1989–1994). He was a longstanding friend of Jean Marie Le Pen.

== Early life ==
Pierre Ceyrac was born on 18 September 1946 in Douai, Nord, France. He is the nephew of the renowned Jesuit Pierre Ceyrac as well as the nephew of Francois Ceyrac, former president of the CNPF (National Centre of French Employers).

== Career ==
Ceyrac joined the Front National in 1970. He was subsequently in charge of Jean Marie Le Pen's presidential campaigns, and was departmental Secretary of the Front National for the north of France based at Roubaix. He served as a member of the National Assembly from 1986 to 1988, representing Nord.

On 12 October 1989, the British Western Goals Institute hosted a fringe meeting at the Conservative Party (UK) Conference in Blackpool, at which Ceyrac, as a Front National Member of the European Parliament, was the Guest Speaker. He left the National Front in 1994.

Ceyrac was seen in a Trump Tower restaurant with Marine Le Pen, Louis Aliot and George Lombardi on 11 January 2017.

He died on 21 April 2018 in Bondues, Nord.

== Personal life ==
Ceyrac was a member of the Unification Church.
