= 2004 Ulster Unionist Party leadership election =

- 27 March 2004
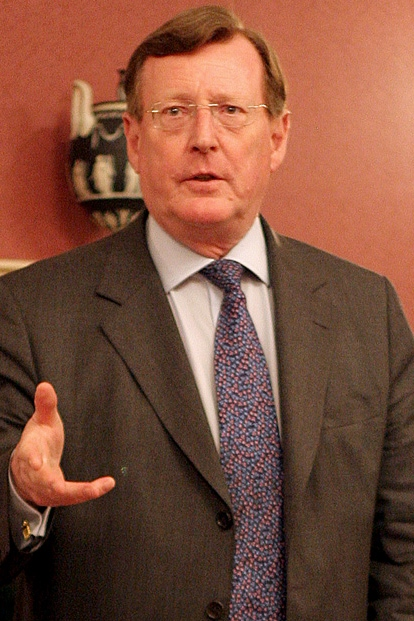
Candidate	David Trimble	David Hoey	Robert Oliver
First Ballot	448	162	132
Percentage	60.4%	21.8%	17.8%
Leader before election
David Trimble
Elected Leader
David Trimble

The 2004 Ulster Unionist Party leadership election was triggered by the decision of a group of UUP members to challenge incumbent leader David Trimble over the party's direction following the 2003 Northern Ireland Assembly elections at the party's annual general meeting on 27 March 2004. The UUP has held a leadership election every March since at least the Ulster Unionist Council constitution was altered in 1973, however it is rarely contested. This is one of the few occasions when it has been contested.

The election was decided by delegates to the Ulster Unionist Council. After one round of voting Trimble retained his leadership.

== Candidates ==
- David Hoey, management consultant from Coleraine
- Robert Oliver, businessman from Portadown and Treasurer of Trimble's Constituency Party
- David Trimble, MP for Upper Bann and sitting leader

Hoey declared prior to the election that he was a Stalking horse candidate who would stand aside in favour of others should he win the contest. Oliver insisted that should he win he would serve as leader despite holding no elected office.

It was believed that Trimble would easily win, but would have to stand down should both challengers poll more than 50% of votes cast combined.

== Results ==
Candidate	Total	
Candidate	Votes	%
David Trimble ✓	448	60.4
David Hoey	162	21.8
Robert Oliver	132	17.8
Total	742	100

David Trimble was re-elected.

In addition the party Presidency was subject to re-election. The incumbent, the Rev. Martin Smyth MP, a constant critic of Trimble, lost the post to Lord Rogan by 407 to 329 votes.

Following the election neither defeated candidate immediately left the party. Hoey contested the party selection convention for the nomination to fight the East Londonderry seat in the 2005 UK general election but was defeated by MLA, David McClarty. He also unsuccessfully stood to be a party officer at the 2006 AGM of the UUC. Hoey left the party sometime in 2006, and contested the 2007 Northern Ireland Assembly election for Robert McCartney's UK Unionist Party (UKUP) in South Belfast. Oliver unsuccessfully stood for election to Craigavon Borough Council in 2005 as a UUP candidate, and considered also standing for the 2010 Ulster Unionist Party leadership election.
