= 2000 Ulster Unionist Party leadership election =

- 25 March 2000
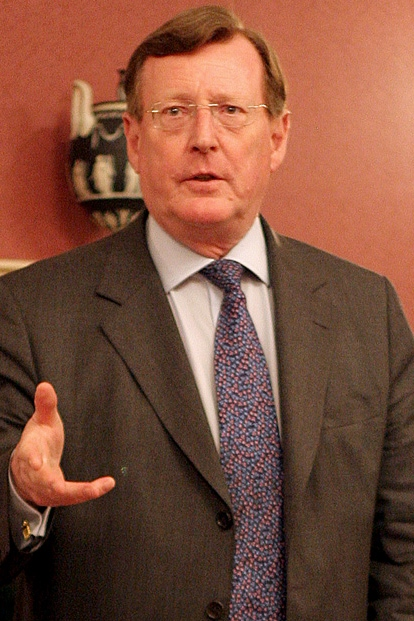
Candidate	David Trimble	Martin Smyth
First Ballot	457	348
Percentage	56.8%	43.2%
Leader before election
David Trimble
Elected Leader
David Trimble

The 2000 Ulster Unionist Party leadership election was triggered by the decision of Martin Smyth to challenge incumbent David Trimble over the party's direction in the implementation of the Belfast Agreement at the party's annual general meeting on 25 March 2000. Reverend Smyth, the Member of Parliament (MP) for South Belfast who was opposed to the Good Friday Agreement, made the move after Trimble indicated that he was prepared to re-establish Northern Ireland's power-sharing executive, working with Sinn Féin ahead of I.R.A. disarmament.

Smyth had run against Trimble for leadership before in 1995 after James Molyneaux stepped down.

The UUP has held a leadership election every March since at least the Ulster Unionist Council constitution was altered in 1973, however it is rarely contested. This is one of the few occasions when it has been contested.

The election was decided by delegates to the Ulster Unionist Council. After one round of voting Trimble retained his leadership. In spite of winning the election, Trimble's reduced support was perceived as damaging his authority as well as the Peace process in general.

== Candidates ==
- Martin Smyth, MP for Belfast South and former Grand Master of the Orange Order
- David Trimble, MP for Upper Bann and sitting leader

== Results ==
Candidate	Total	
Candidate	Votes	%
David Trimble ✓	457	56.8
Martin Smyth	348	43.2
Total	805	100

David Trimble was re-elected.

Smyth retired from the House of Commons in 2005; Trimble lost his seat in the election of that year but was made a life peer in 2006.
