= Harvey Ward (director-general) =

Rhodesian businessman (1927–1995)

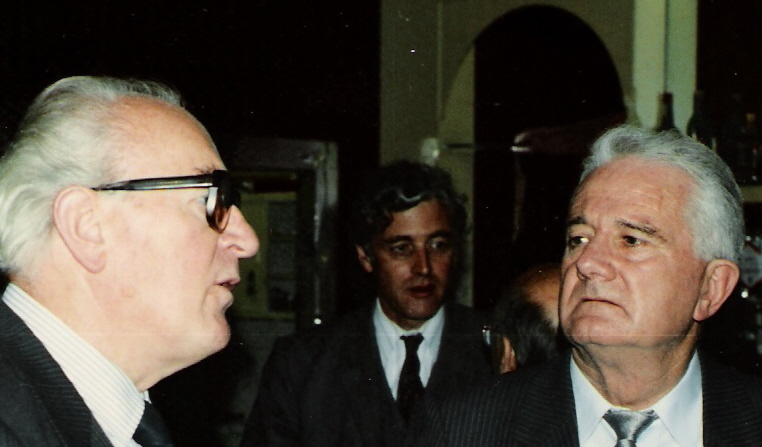
Harvey Ward, right, in conversation with Zygmunt Szkopiak

Harvey Grenville Ward (1927 – April 1995) was a Director-General of the Rhodesian Broadcasting Corporation noted for his anticommunism and for supporting Ian Smith's government in Rhodesia and South Africa. Ward was a leading member of the Conservative Monday Club.

== Early life ==
Ward was born in Bulawayo 1927 October 6, Southern Rhodesia to an English father (George Harvey Grenville Ward ("Tim") and a South African mother of Prussian descent (Francesca Schmidt). He had one borther George Neville Harvey Ward b 1929 His parents settled at Oakroyd, in Clifton Beach, Cape Town, Africa and were engaged in enterprises such as the financing of railway construction and the building of numerous hotels. They managed the Victoria Falls Hotel until 1937. He attended the General Botha naval training ship school in Simonstown, and played rugby for Hamilton. He boxed for the Western Province under the tutelage of Max Schnelling becoming welterweight champion. He married Patricia Fionna Tothill on 17th November 1951 (whose father Reginald Haberfield Tothill and mother (Philomena Frances Lupton of Newry Ireland) owned the Tothill's Pharmacy in Waterkant Street Cape Town. He chose a career in journalism by starting with the Cape Argus as shipping correspondent, then sports writer. He was struck down with polio in 1955 but survived and then became a specialist in African journalism covering the great social upheavals of the late 1950s and the 1960s for Reuters. He then settled in Salisbury in 1958 and became Head of News Services at the Rhodesia Herald, eventually becoming Director-General of the Rhodesian Broadcasting Corporation.

== Exile ==
An armed insurrection, several years of negotiations and the imposition of sanctions by South Africa at the behest of The West, Ian Smith's administration was replaced by African majority rule in 1979. Ward described it as "the betrayal of western nations to their own kind". As a prominent supporter of Smith's administration, Ward was forced to leave Zimbabwe. He and his family moved to South Africa and advised the white minority government there on how to avoid international economic sanctions.

== Anticommunism ==
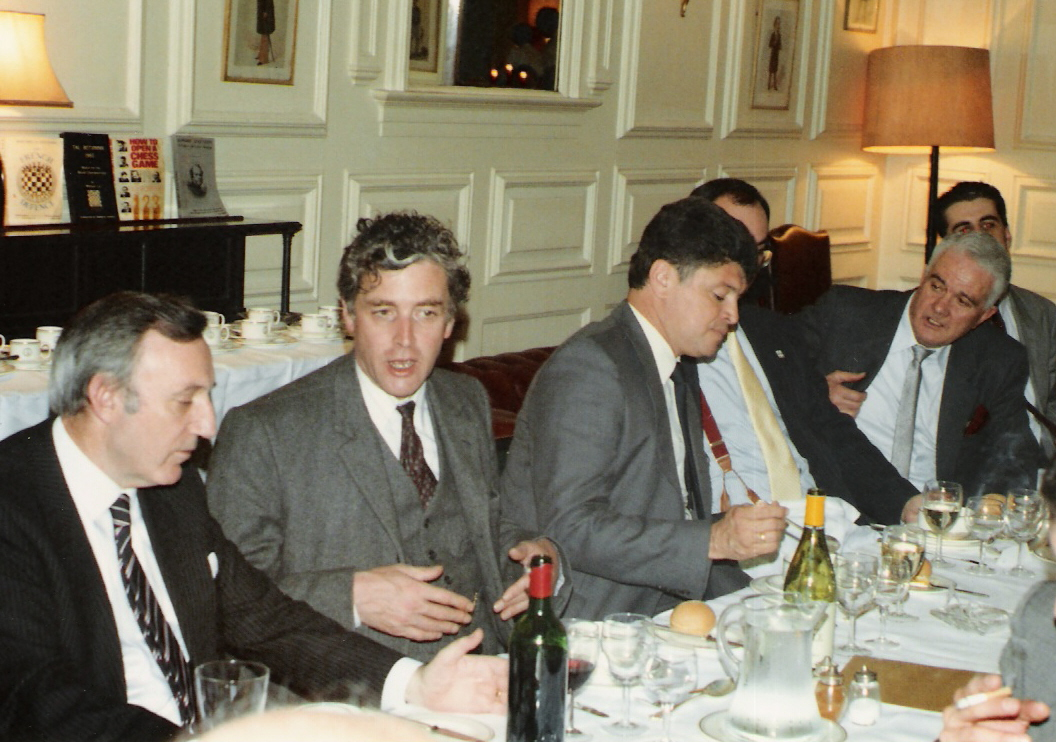
At the Western Goals Institute's 'El Salvador' Dinner, London, 25 September 1989. L to R: Denis Walker, Lord Sudeley, El Salvador's Foreign Minister, Andrew Smith (yellow tie), and Harvey Ward (leaning forward).

Subsequently, Ward served as a political adviser to many African leaders and was involved in international intelligence. His watch-word became "dedicated to fighting communism" and he traveled worldwide, lecturing on counter-insurgency and terrorism. He described the Soviet Union as run by "gangsters" and totally untrustworthy.

He presented a weekly program for 15 minutes on RBC called "World Survey" where he commented on the global political changes relevant to the spread of communism from his perspective.

He supported the anti-communist revolts in the former Soviet Bloc saying that it was "a simple matter of good versus evil." In Africa, Ward saw no hope. "Africa is the most exploited of all the continents, and it will stay that way. There has never been any peace in Africa, and I see no end to tribal conflict, spreading of diseases and other plagues," he said.

== Monday Club ==
Ward was an overseas member of the Conservative Monday Club and found himself the center of a minor sensation on 26 July 1977, when immigration officials at Heathrow Airport held him for seven hours before they formally refused him permission to enter Britain and placed him aboard another plane to Munich. He was due to address a meeting of the Africa Committee of the Monday Club at the House of Lords, organized by the former Conservative Party MP Harold Soref on the 29th, and visit family in Gloucestershire. On being asked why entry had never been refused on previous journeys to Britain by Ward, a Home Office spokesman said, "I don't know. It may have been a mistake or oversight". Formal protests were made to the Home Office by Tory Members of Parliament (MPs) John Biggs-Davison, Sir Patrick Wall, and Teddy Taylor.

In 1982, he wrote an article Zimbabwe Today, for the Monday Club's journal, Monday World, that was prophetic in its content. His wife died in 1986, and he moved to the United Kingdom. Three of his four children remained in South Africa.

At the October 1988 Conservative Party Conference, Western Goals UK (which Ward had also joined) held a fringe meeting on the subject of "International Terrorism - how the West can fight back". Harvey Ward, Sir Alfred Sherman, Rev Martin Smyth, MP, and Andrew Hunter, MP, were the speakers. The latter spoke concerning top-level links between the Provisional Irish Republican Army (IRA) and African National Congress (ANC).

In 1989 Ward was working for James Gibb Stuart at Ossian Books Ltd. in Glasgow. He continued to travel and lecture, and joined the Conservative Party.

He became an active member of the Foreign Affairs Committee of the Conservative Monday Club, and by 1990 was a member of the Club's Executive Council.

== Character assassination ==
In 1991, Ward is claimed to have worked in conjunction with South African security policeman Paul Erasmus to leak false accusations secretly against Winnie Mandela and her daughters by accusing them of being nymphomaniacs and drug abusers. The reports were described as having come from dissidents in the African National Congress. They were issued in an effort to divide the ANC's leadership. They were then taken up by papers such as The Independent, The Sunday Times and Vanity Fair. Erasmus later acknowledged profound regret for his actions in that and other matters and affected a reconciliation with Mandela. He claimed Ward's role in the propaganda campaign during the late 1990s but only after Ward had died.

== Later life ==
In the early 1990s, Ward's fourth child, Rowena, who had been in the British Police Service, returned to live in South Africa. Ward followed and took up residence in Port Elizabeth with his son, Harvey and his daughter-in-law, Kathy. His last public engagement was a speech at the Robbie Burns Society in Port Elizabeth in March 1995. One month later, he had a heart attack during a game of bowls and died.

== See also ==
- Whites in Zimbabwe
