= Western Goals Institute =

British far-right pressure group

Western Goals Institute (WGI) was a far-right pressure group and think-tank in Britain, formed in 1989 from Western Goals UK, which was founded in 1985 as an offshoot of the U.S. Western Goals Foundation. It was anti-communist and opposed non-white immigration.

== Early aims ==
The Western Goals Institute was founded (as Western Goals UK) in May 1985 as the British branch of the American organisation the Western Goals Foundation. In March 1987, Western Goals UK had filed a complaint with the Charity Commission for England and Wales against three major British charities, Oxfam, War on Want, and Christian Aid stating that they were involved in political campaigning work (which was then contrary to UK charity law) in support of left-wing organizations due to their campaigns against apartheid in South Africa. The Charities Commission partially upheld the Western Goals complaint, obliging War on Want (which at the time was led by George Galloway, later an MP) to halt political campaigning.

In October 1988, Western Goals held a well-attended fringe meeting at the Conservative Party Conference addressed by their patron, Walter Walker, former Commander-in-Chief of NATO forces in Northern Europe, Patrick Wall, the MP for Beverley, Martin Smyth, Ulster Unionist MP for Belfast South, and others on terrorism, claiming to highlight the links between the African National Congress and the Provisional Irish Republican Army. Western Goals subsequently issued a paper summarising the issues raised at this meeting.

As a result of their expanding activities, membership and organisation, Western Goals UK was relaunched in 1989, becoming the Western Goals Institute, independent of the U.S. foundation. Gregory Lauder-Frost, then a leading member of the Conservative Monday Club, was invited in February to join Thomas J. Bergen, Peter Dally, Antony Flew, Linda Catoe Guell, Joseph Labia, Tryggvi McDonald, Rev. Martin Smyth, Lord Sudeley, Harvey Ward and Basil Watson, as vice-presidents of the institute. The institute's stated aims were to "combat the insidious menace of liberalism and Communism within all sectors of British society" and its initial activities included denouncing what it described as "extremist" left-wing Labour Party candidates. The institute was also critical of the United Nations, its Director Andrew Smith stating "western nations (when dealing with the Iraqi invasion of Kuwait) have seen fit to submit themselves to the writ of the UN, a body largely composed of regimes hostile to western democratic values."

The institute stated its aims on the BBC in 1991:

"Western Goals works to establish networks and links with conservative groups dedicated to the preservation of the cultures and identities of western nations. We are conservatives who believe in traditional conservative values. A multicultural society does not work. We wish to protect the way of life we had before immigrants arrived. It was a mistake to permit these people to come here. Politicians must now accept this. Large numbers of immigrants reject European culture and wish to remain alien in religion and culture. We want European culture in European countries. We would seek to have treaties with countries to permit resettlement."

Initially, the Western Goals Institute drew some support from Conservative parliamentarians, and the London magazine City Limits stated that "Western Goals is talking the same blunt authoritarian language as many Tory back-benchers and rank and file Tories. It is a group to be reckoned with ... having a formidable list of honorary patrons and Vice-Presidents".

With an increasingly public role, Western Goals attracted left-wing hostility. In September 1991, the Campaign Against Fascism demonstrated outside the home of Lord Sudeley, they said, "to expose his involvement in setting up an international network of right-wing extremists". In response, Sudeley refuted the claims and described Western Goals "as being committed to the traditional values of conservatism in England". Mike Whine, Defence Director of the Board of British Jewish Deputies, described the institute as "not fascists or anti-Semitic, but they inhabit the shadowy, nether-world of the far right-wing".

== International links ==
The institute and its predecessor were affiliated with the World Anti-Communist League. As Western Goals delegate, Andrew Smith attended the 21st conference of the World Anti-Communist League held in Geneva 27–29 August 1988, which was addressed by one of Western Goals UK's patrons, Major-General John K. Singlaub, (the other two patrons being General Sir Walter Walker and Major Sir Patrick Wall, M.C.). Smith contributed an article on the speech in WACL's Free World Report the following January. In July 1990, WGI sent a delegation to the 22nd WACL Conference in Brussels and from 1991 WGI was the UK chapter of the senior World League.

In line with the Reagan Doctrine policies of its American patrons, Western Goals UK had established links with militant, and often violent, anti-Communist groups internationally. These include the Angolan UNITA movement (in October 1988 Western Goals facilitated the visit to London of UNITA's leader, Jonas Savimbi) and the Salvadoran Nationalist Republican Alliance (ARENA) party, whose leader, Roberto D'Aubuisson, became one of the group's international patrons. It was also claimed that Western Goals may have been used by its U.S. partners as a conduit for funds to the Nicaraguan Contras following the 'Contragate' scandal.

The institute was reaching out to a variety of robustly conservative associations which were also opposed to communism. In August Lauder-Frost was forging links with Joachim Siegerist of Die Deutschen Konservativen e.V., in Hamburg, and London's Time Out magazine carried a report headlined "Bad Taste" in September saying that the Western Goals hierarchy, in addition to courting Jean-Marie Le Pen, and Franz Schönhuber of the German Republikaner Party, had been dining at Simpsons-in-the-Strand, London, with El Salvador's Arena Party President Major Roberto d'Aubuisson, who subsequently became one of the institute's patrons. This was followed by a letter in The Times signed by Lord Sudeley, Sir Alfred Sherman, Professor Antony Flew and Dr. Harvey Ward, on behalf of the institute, "applauding Alfredo Cristiani's statesmanship" and calling for his government's success in defeating the Cuban and Nicaraguan-backed communist FMLN terrorists. The following year, on 21 February 1990, Lauder-Frost appeared on BBC's Newsnight opposing Labour MP Alice Mahon's support for Communist insurgents in Central America.

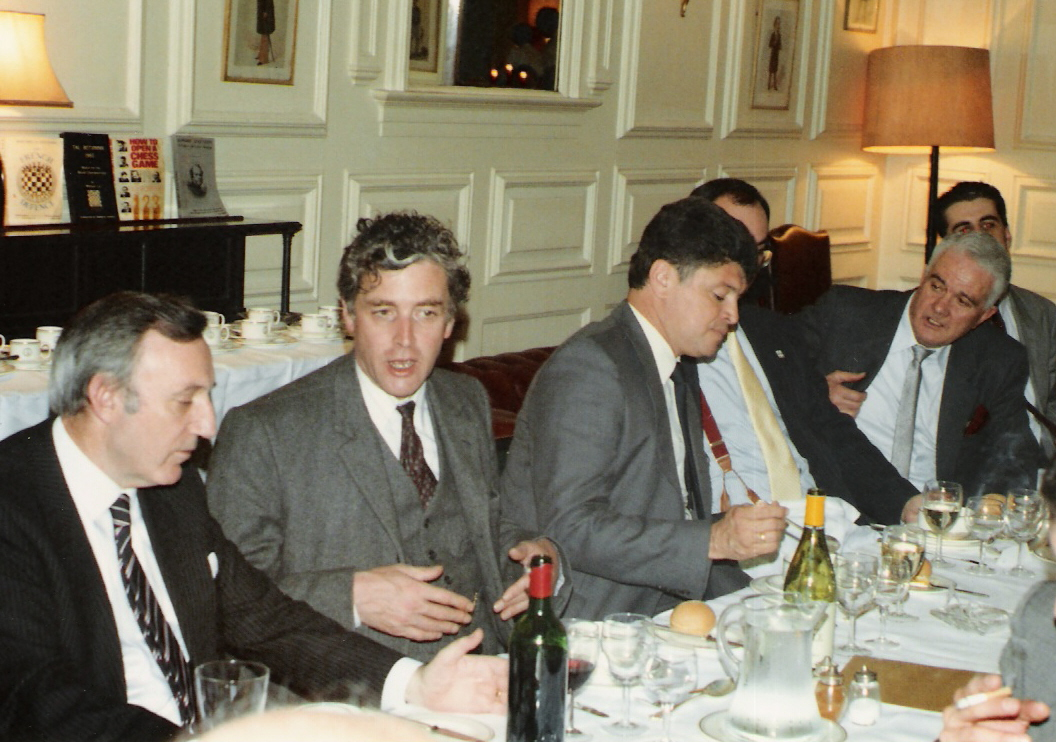
At the Western Goals Institute 'El Salvador' Presidential Dinner, London, 25 September 1989. L to R: Denis Walker, Lord Sudeley, José Manuel Pacas (Salvadorean Foreign Minister), Andrew Smith (yellow tie), Dr Harvey Ward.

The institute's tabloid newspaper European Dawn also reported that in September 1990 that Burkhard Schmidt, executive director of Western Goals Europe e.V., and the American European Strategy Research Institute had contacted the institute urging them to forge links with young people opposing communism in Czechoslovakia, and that the following month an eight-strong delegation from the institute visited Munich for discussions with the German Republikaner Party which at that time had six members in the European Union Parliament.

=== Front National ===
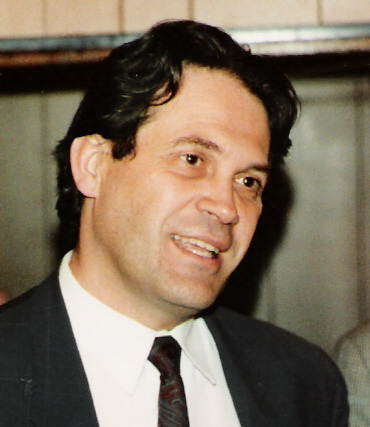
Pierre Ceyrac, MEP, speaking to the Western Goals Institute, 12 October 1989

In Europe, Western Goals gave their open support to the French Front National, the far-right political party led by Jean-Marie Le Pen. On 12 October 1989, the Western Goals Institute hosted a controversial fringe meeting at the Conservative Party Conference in Blackpool, at which Pierre Ceyrac, a Front National Member of the European Parliament, was the Guest Speaker. Western Goals also hosted a widely reported dinner for Jean-Marie Le Pen, whom they had invited to Britain, at the Charing Cross Hotel in the Strand, London in December 1991. There was a large demonstration against the dinner outside the hotel and some damage to property took place, including the hotel's front doors and surroundings, which were smashed. After the visit by Le Pen, the Western Goals Institute Director Andrew Smith was quoted as saying:

"There is scope for a radical right alternative outside the Conservative Party. The Tories have betrayed their principles since Mrs Thatcher fell. With this contact with European leaders we are laying the foundations for a new party.".

The possibility of founding a new right-wing party, on the model of Le Pen's Front National, appears to have been abandoned by Smith after the Conservative Party's win in the 1992 General Election ensured that proportional representation stayed off the political agenda for the foreseeable future. However even at the time, the gradual defection of the parliamentary advisory committee and the decision of the leadership of the Monday Club and associated MPs to stay away from the Le Pen Dinner made the prospect unlikely. The institute maintained its contacts with the FN and were invited to send delegates to their congress in Strasbourg in March 1997. The Western Goals Newsletter of January 1998 carried an article of praise, reporting on the "FN Successes in France".

=== Conservative Party of South Africa ===
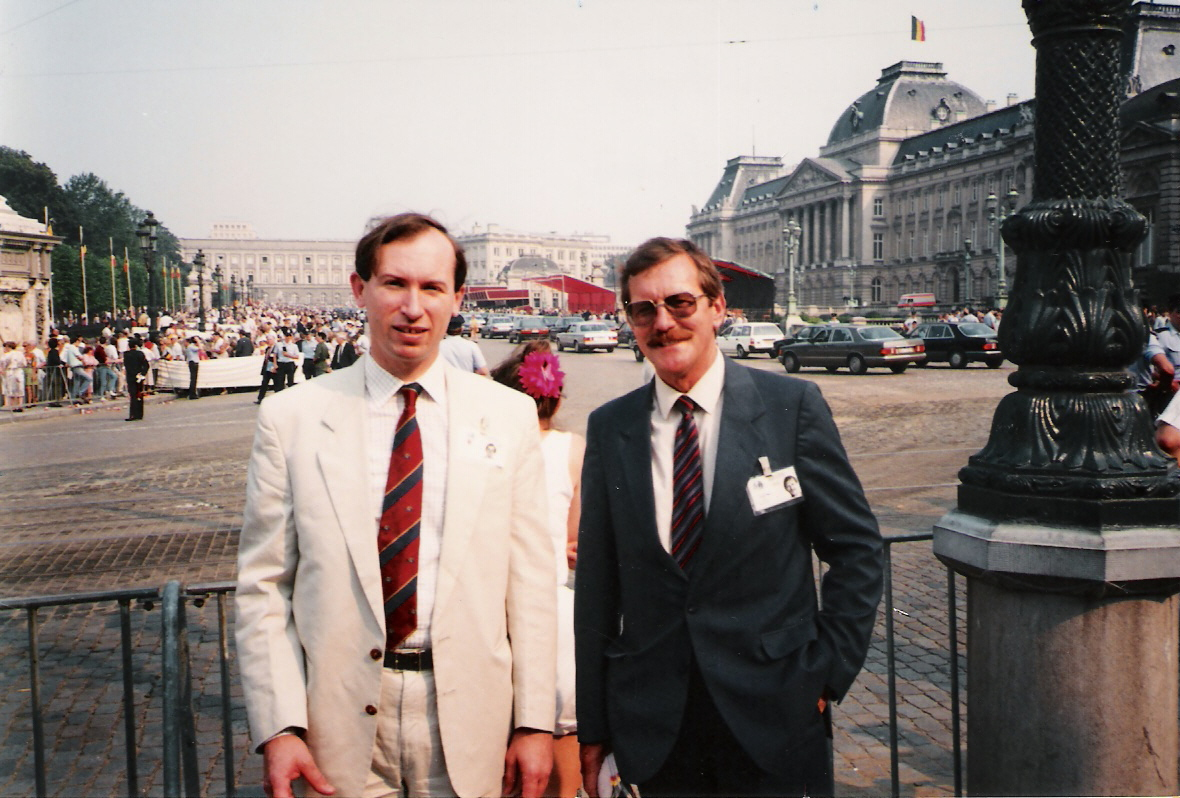
Gregory Lauder-Frost and Clive Derby-Lewis in Brussels as WGI delegates to the World Anti-Communist League Conference, 21 July 1990

WGI supported the continuance of white-dominated government in South Africa, and formed close links with the South African Conservative Party which some years previously broke away from the National Party after P.W. Botha instituted limited reforms to apartheid and which the institute saw as fighting communism in the form of the African National Congress.

WGI hosted a visit to the UK, in June 1989, of the Conservative Party of South Africa's leader Andries Treurnicht, as well as other leading members, with close links continuing for many years. At the time the party held 22 seats in the whites-only chamber of the South African Parliament making them the official opposition. A press conference was held for the delegation in a committee room of the House of Lords on 5 June. Conservative Party of South Africa MP Clive Derby-Lewis, then one of sixty members of the integrated State President's Council, was made an honorary vice-president of the WGI and the following year joined the WGI delegation to the WACL Conference in Brussels. Derby-Lewis was described as a "right-wing extremist" by The Daily Telegraph; and as someone who "even by South African standards...has acquired over the years a reputation as a rabid racist" by journalist and South Africa commentator John Carlin. He later served a life sentence for conspiracy to murder Chris Hani, a leader of the South African Communist Party and of the ANC's Umkhonto we Sizwe, the armed wing of the African National Congress, who was assassinated in 1993. The United Nations High Commissioner for Refugees (2 July 1993) lists the Western Goals Institute as an "impediment" to the elimination of racial discrimination in South Africa, saying of the institute that it "claims to be devoted to protecting the Western way of life by offering self-defence training to white South Africans".

== Relationship with the Conservative Party ==
The WGI initially worked towards its goals via members of the British Conservative Party, and in particular via the right-wing Conservative Monday Club with whom it also shared some members: Andrew Smith had been a former chairman of the club's Young Members Group, Paul Masson and Stuart Notholt, "one-time member of the editorial board of the Conservative 'Dreadnaught Group'", also Monday Clubbers, were all on Western Goals' first UK Directorate. Western Goals activists Lauder-Frost, Anthony Murphy, and Dr. Harvey Ward all held "key positions in the Monday Club Executive". Others included Sir Alfred Sherman and his son Gideon.

From the mid-1980s, Western Goals had established a parliamentary advisory committee of Conservative MPs which included Sir Patrick Wall, Nicholas Winterton, Neil Hamilton and Bill Walker, as well as Martin Smyth of the Ulster Unionist Party for Belfast South.

In 1991, Western Goals was accused in a newspaper report of engineering a "take-over" of the Conservative Monday Club, and there were reports that some veteran members believed the club had become "more extreme". Gregory Lauder-Frost, writing in his capacity as Club Political Secretary, rejected these claims in a right-of-reply letter published the following week. In September 1992, Sir Norman Fowler, in an attempt to distance the Conservative Party from the institute, said that "No one in Western Goals is known by Central Office to belong to our party". This followed the institute's invitation to Jean-Marie Le Pen, and 31-year-old Italian parliamentary deputy, Alessandra Mussolini, to address fringe meetings at the 1992 Conservative Party conference (although they both were unable to come to Britain and the meetings were subsequently cancelled). The invitation to Miss Mussolini reportedly "caused outrage", and led to calls for a ban on her entering the country.

The Jewish Chronicle reported on 25 September 1992 that Marc Gordon, director of the libertarian International Freedom Foundation, a US-based organisation wholly funded by the revisionist de Klerk government in South Africa, urged the Conservative Party to expel members of Western Goals, doubtless because of the WGI's support of the South African Conservative Party. In the same newspaper on 2 October, Julian Lewis (now a Member of Parliament, then deputy head of Conservative Central Office's Research Department), said he would strongly advise local associations that Western Goals was hostile to Conservative objectives. The Guardian subsequently accused the WGI of attempting "to infiltrate fascists into the Conservative Party", which the WGI disputed as "rubbish".

== Notable activities ==
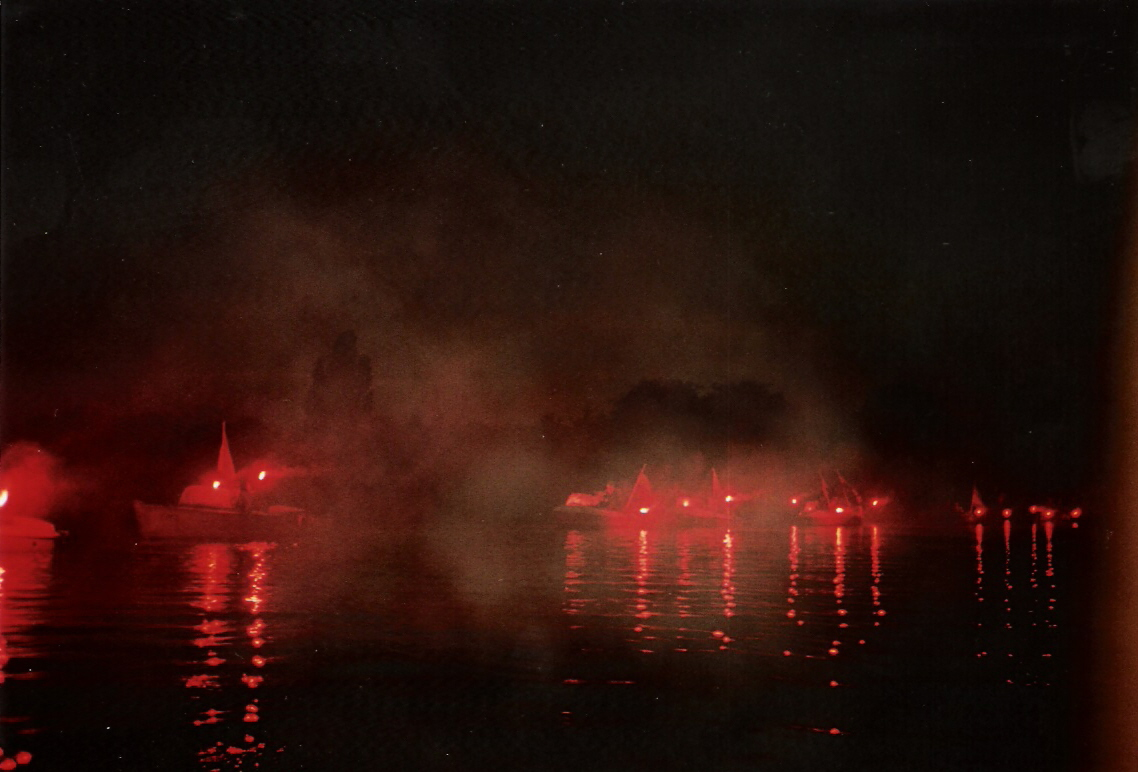
Torchlit small boat flotilla enters the lake at Mölln, near Hamburg, as part of the anti-Communist demonstration on 12 August 1989, to which the WGI sent a delegation. Each boat carries a flag of a province or city lost after 1945.

On 12 August 1989, a delegation from the Western Goals Institute attended an anti-communist demonstration at Mölln, near Lübeck which over 20,000 people attended. The rally was organised by Die Deutschen Konservativen e. V., led by Joachim Siegerist, who later became a Latvian parliamentarian.

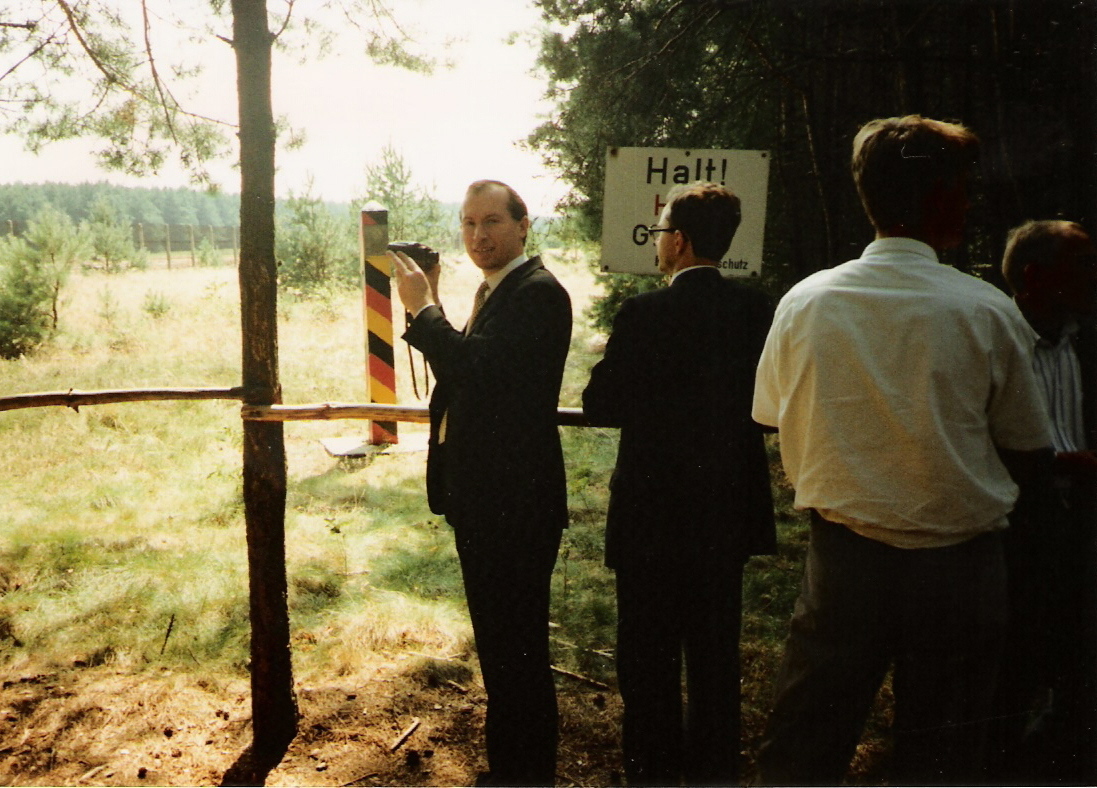
WGI delegation (Lauder-Frost with the binoculars) looks across no-mans land into East Germany (GDR) east of Mölln where numerous refugees had been shot dead before reaching the west. 13 August 1989.

On 25 September 1989, Lord Sudeley chaired a Western Goals dinner at Simpson's-in-the-Strand for El Salvador's president, Alfredo Cristiani, and his inner cabinet. The guest list included figures such as Sir Alfred Sherman (policy advisor to Margaret Thatcher), Lord Nicholas Hervey, Antony Flew, Zygmunt Szkopiak, Denis Walker and Harvey Ward.

The group hosted social events including an Annual Dinner at the Grosvenor Hotel at Victoria on 24 November 1989 when the guest of honour was Kenneth Griffith. On 20 November 1990, they hosted the General Franco Memorial Dinner in Whitehall, commemorating the anniversary of his death. This was also chaired by Baron Sudeley. A WGI notice in The Times stated that the late ruler of Spain was "remembered as a hero against communism".

== Later years ==
Despite his upbeat press comments at the time of Le Pen's visit in December 1991, Western Goals director Andrew Smith was quoted in April 1993 as saying that "on reflection the Le Pen visit was the zenith and also the beginning of the end" for him. However Private Eye cited him at the same time as saying that the institute was "currently inactive, i.e: in a state of 'suspended animation', but we have other plans and projects under way."

Negative publicity, the departure from the Directorate in late 1993 of Andrew Smith (replaced by Stuart Millson) and the end of the Soviet Union, meant that the group's activities diminished. In October 1994 Lauder-Frost, writing as WGI Vice-president, called for the Union of Great Britain to be strengthened and rounded on John Major and Jeremy Hanley's comments about traditional Tories being "the enemies within" the Conservative Party. A successful Annual Dinner, chaired by Lauder-Frost, was held at the Grosvenor Hotel, Victoria, in March 1995, at which the guest-of-honour was the Democratic Unionist Party Member of Parliament, Peter Robinson, later First Minister of Northern Ireland.

On 29 March 1997, Lauder-Frost sent a letter of fraternal greeting, on behalf of the Western Goals Institute, to the annual congress of Jean-Marie Le Pen's Front National (FN) at Strasbourg which was read by Le Pen to the 2,200 delegates from the podium to much applause. The institute's January 1998 Newsletter attacked "Blair's Labour regime" which it accused of "breaking up the United Kingdom, diminishing the monarchy, endorsing Sinn Féin and destroying country traditions." In a further article in the same edition Lauder-Frost contributed an article "Christianity & the Millenium calling for "a great service" to be held in Westminster Abbey "representing this Christian Kingdom." In the September edition of the same year, economist James Gibb Stuart had the leading article arguing that "21st century Conservatism must be nationalist", with another by Lauder-Frost arguing that "the non-Anglican statues unveiled at Westminster Abbey in July show that left-wing politics are alive and well in the Church." The institute's regular contributor, Peter Gibbs, had a leading article in the Winter 1999 edition entitled "The Lies, the shame, the betrayal of Ulster" and called for "a rallying cry for the Union".

Lack of adequate finances reduced campaigning to their occasional policy papers, the regular glossy newsletter, press releases, and letters to editors. The institute's last newsletter, which they called a "Special General Election edition", in June 2001, carried a leading article by Stuart Millson entitled "New Labour: A Disgrace to Britain"; an article entitled "MacPherson Report Condemned" in which they stated: "over the last quarter of a century, the racial-industrial complex, with its nasty, parasitical, semi-criminal fringe of self-styled anti-fascists and anti-racists, has emerged as a very serious threat to our freedom"; and a long article entitled "National Identity" by Gregory Lauder-Frost in which he argued "we must act now" and added that "within 20 years Britain's capital city will have a majority non-British population."

The organisation was wound up in 2001 following the death of its long-standing Patron, Walter Walker.

== See also ==
- Traditional Britain Group
