= Denis Walker =

Rhodesian politician (1933–2024)

The Honourable Denis Walker
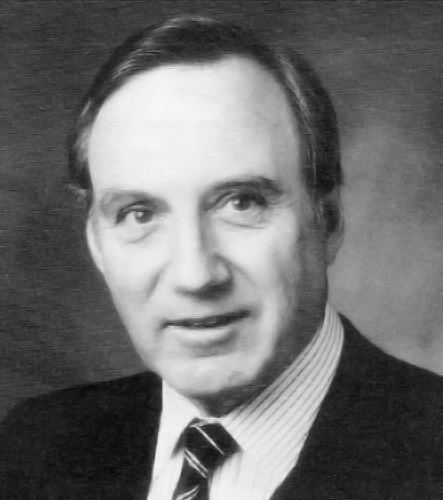
- Walker in 1989

Minister of Education
- In office 1977 – 1978
- Prime Minister: Ian Smith
- Preceded by: A. P. Smith
- Succeeded by: Rowan Cronjé and Godfrey Magaramombe

Member of Parliament for Bulawayo North
- In office 30 July 1974 – c. 1981

Personal details
- Born: Wilfrid Denis Walker; 29 December 1933
- Died: 8 January 2024 (aged 90)
- Party: Rhodesian Front
- Spouse: Jill Walker
- Children: 1

Wilfrid Denis Walker (29 December 1933 – 8 January 2024) was a Rhodesian politician who was a cabinet minister in Rhodesia from 1974 to 1979. He returned to the United Kingdom in 1982 following conflict with the government of Robert Mugabe. As was the case for many Rhodesian politicians in Ian Smith's cabinet, there was the expectation that he would be arrested on false, politically motivated charges aimed at expelling the opposition from the country. He was known for his monarchist activities, anti-communism and was also company secretary, director and treasurer of the International Monarchist League and its UK subsidiary, the Constitutional Monarchy Association.

== Early life ==
Having grown up in Tooting and Chingford, London, Walker was called up for national service in the Royal Fusiliers in 1952. Although he was to be posted to fight in the Korean War, this was cancelled before he departed. He was discharged in 1954. Walker went on to become a Methodist missionary in southern Africa, including time in the townships of Johannesburg. He left the mission service and later settled in Bulawayo, Rhodesia, acquiring Rhodesian citizenship after the Unilateral Declaration of Independence in 1965.

== Political career in Rhodesia/Zimbabwe ==
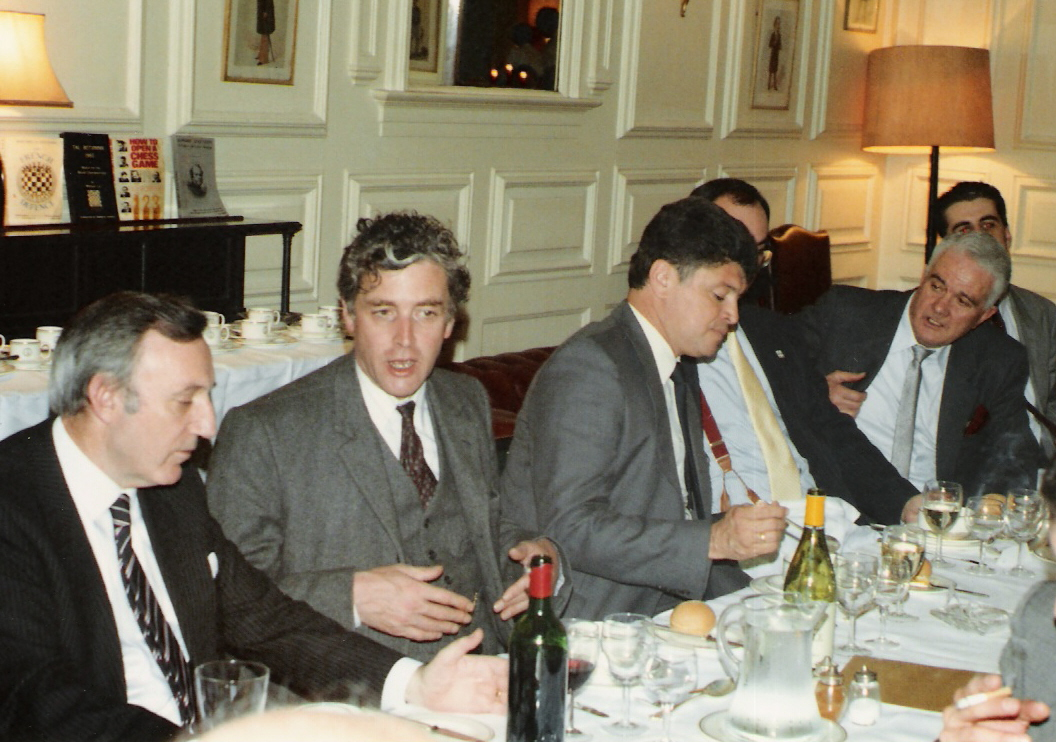
At the Western Goals Institute 'El Salvador' Dinner, London, 25 September 1989. L to R: Denis Walker, Lord Sudeley, José Manuel Pacas Castro (El Salvador's Foreign Minister), Andrew Smith (yellow tie), Harvey Ward

In the Rhodesia general election of 1974, he gained the seat of Bulawayo North as a Rhodesian Front candidate, polling 93.4% of the vote among the electorate. After this success, he was re-elected in both the 1977 and 1979 elections. Walker served as Minister of Education from 1977 in Ian Smith's government and also held office under Abel Muzorewa. In January 1979, he was appointed Minister of Internal Affairs, serving alongside Kayisa Ndiweni until the Government of Zimbabwe-Rhodesia was established in June 1979, after which he held office as a Deputy Minister.

Following the end of Rhodesia and the creation of Zimbabwe, he remained as an MP, but came under pressure from the new government of Robert Mugabe. He was to have been arrested (on suspicion of attempting to overthrow the government) on 10 December 1981, together with the MP for Bulawayo South, Wally Stuttaford, but had already left the country. Unlike Walker, Stuttaford was arrested and tortured by the government after he was falsely accused of being a South African agent. When Walker returned in January 1982, he briefly re-attended Parliament. However, upon learning that the Mugabe government had stationed police around the building to arrest him, Walker was forced to leave the country and returned to Britain.

== Return to Britain ==
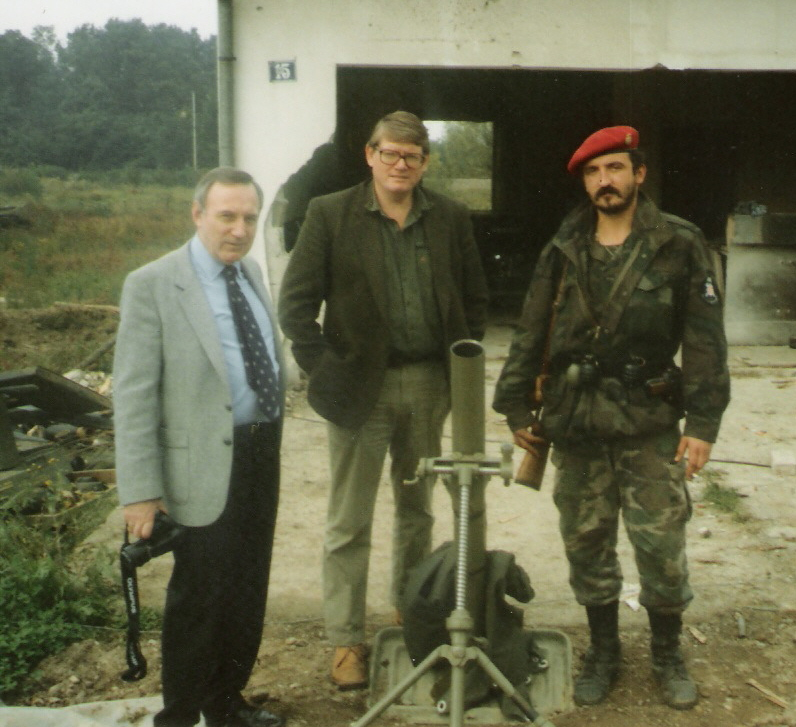
Walker and Andrew Hunter MP on the Croatia–Serbia front line as part of the Monday Club delegation, 12 October 1991

On 10 February 1982, Walker delivered a letter to Margaret Thatcher at 10 Downing Street highlighting the political situation in Zimbabwe. On 29 September 1986, Walker was the guest-of-honour at a Conservative Monday Club Foreign Affairs Committee Dinner at Bailey's Hotel, Gloucester Road, South Kensington, chaired by Richard Stallabrass, who had previously served in Rhodesia. He subsequently joined the club and joined the Executive Council as membership secretary in 1990. He also chaired the International Monarchist League.

== Other activities ==
Walker was a trustee of the Zimbabwe-Rhodesia Relief Fund, a charity that describes itself as assisting "Zimbabwe Rhodesians throughout the world". He administered the International Monarchist League, the Monday Club, and other business activities from an office at Bishop's Stortford, Hertfordshire. Denis Walker was married to Jill Walker, who was born in South Africa, and had one son.

On 1 November 1989, Walker produced a paper for the Monday club's Foreign Affairs Committee on Land Reform in Zimbabwe. In his last paragraph, he stated:

Once the land has been redistributed, the commercial farms will be broken up, the remaining white farmers reduced by exile or imprisonment; Zimbabwe's government, already morally bankrupt, will decline towards economic collapse.

Denis Walker died on 8 January 2024 at the age of 90.

Political offices
Preceded by A. P. Smith	Minister of Education; 1977–1978	Succeeded by Rowan Cronjé and Godfrey Magaramombe
Preceded by Rollo Hayman	Co-Minister of Internal Affairs, Local Government and Housing, and Works; With Chief Kayisa Ndiweni; January–June 1979	Succeeded by Herbert Zimuto (Home Affairs); Walter Mthimkhulu (Local Government and Housing); Chief Kayisa Ndiweni (Works)
Preceded by New post	Deputy Minister of Mines and Works; June–December 1979	Succeeded by Post abolished
