= Simpson's-in-the-Strand =

London restaurant

Coordinates: 51°30′38″N 0°07′14″W

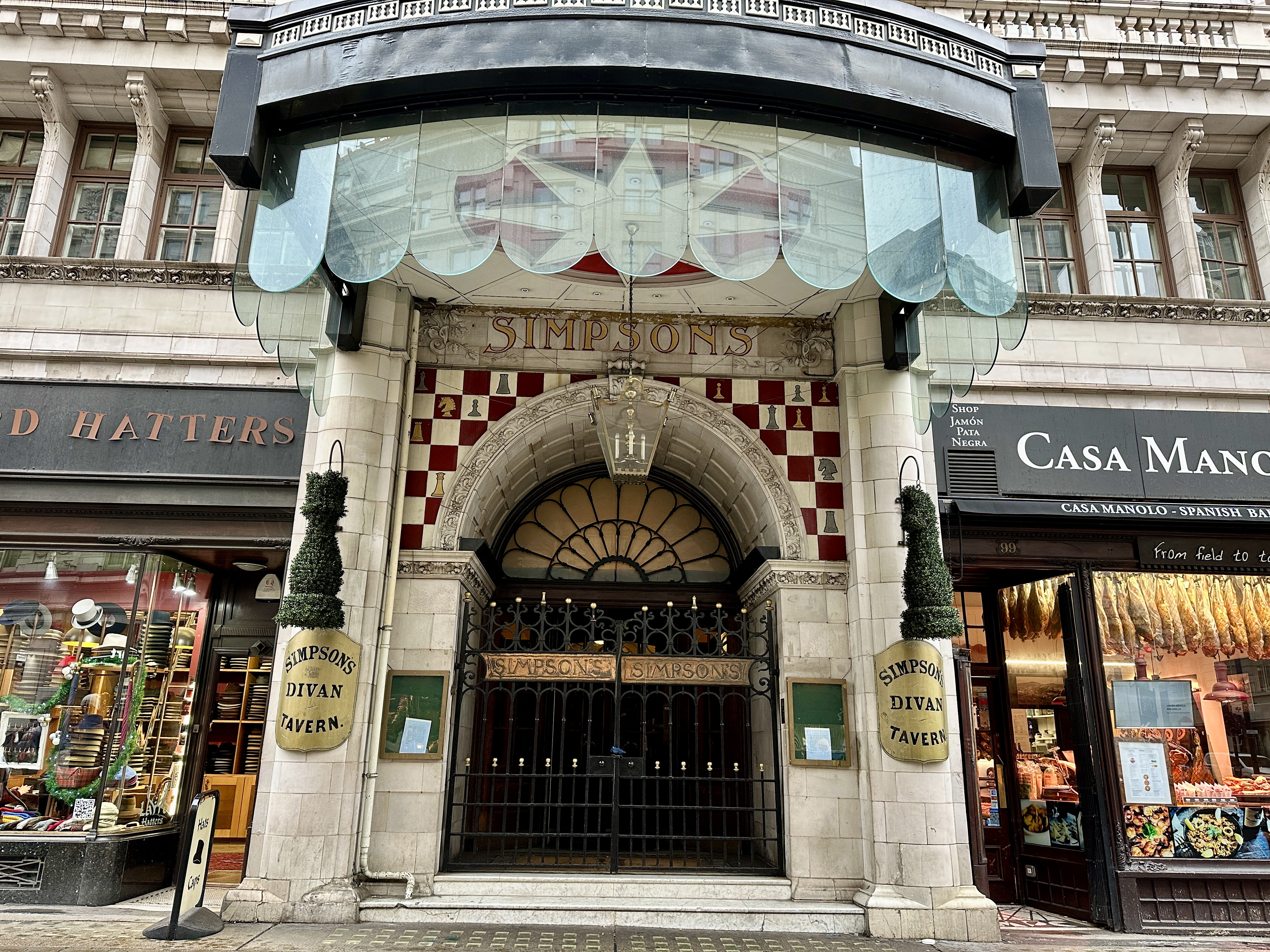
Simpson's-in-the-Strand

Simpson's-in-the-Strand is a restaurant in the Strand, London, serving traditional English cuisine. It is part of the Savoy Buildings, which also contain the Savoy Hotel. The restaurant closed in March 2020, due to the COVID-19 pandemic, and reopened under restaurateur Jeremy King in March 2026.

After a modest start in 1828 as a smoking room and soon afterwards as a coffee house, Simpson's became a tavern in 1848 and achieved a dual fame, around 1850, for its traditional English food, particularly roast meats, and also as the most important venue in Britain for chess in the nineteenth century. Chess ceased to be a feature after Simpson's was bought by the Savoy Hotel group of companies at the end of the century, but as a purveyor of traditional English food, Simpson's has remained a celebrated dining venue throughout the twentieth century and into the twenty-first. P. G. Wodehouse called it "a restful temple of food".

== Early development ==
An earlier building on the site was the Fountain Tavern, home to the celebrated literary group the Kit-Cat Club, but this was replaced by Samuel Reiss's Grand Cigar Divan which opened in 1828. The establishment soon developed as a coffee house, where gentlemen smoked cigars with their coffee, browsed over the daily journals and newspapers, indulged in lengthy conversations about the politics of the day and played chess, sitting on comfortable divans or sofas. Regular visitors would pay one guinea (21 shillings, that is, a pound and a shilling) a year for the use of the facilities and cups of coffee. The daily entrance fee for others was sixpence (6d) (which would be 2½ new pence), or a shilling and sixpence (1/6d) (7½ new pence) with coffee and a cigar.

Chess matches were played against other coffee houses in the town, with top-hatted runners carrying the news of each move. The Grand Cigar Divan soon became recognised as the home of chess in England. Today, one of Simpson's original chess sets is displayed in the Bishop's Room.

In 1848, Reiss joined forces with the caterer John Simpson (1808 or 1809–1864) to expand the premises, renaming it "Simpson's Grand Divan Tavern". It was soon established as one of the top London restaurants, becoming a popular attraction with patrons including Charles Dickens, William Ewart Gladstone, Benjamin Disraeli, and later Arthur Conan Doyle, Winston Churchill, Peter O'Toole and Charles III. Simpson introduced its tradition of silently wheeling large joints of meat on silver dinner trolleys to each table and carving them in front of guests, initially as a way to serve food without disturbing chess-playing customers' concentration. The establishment flourished: in the 1851 census, the Cigar Divan's premises were home to the tavern keeper, the manager, and 21 staff. The restaurant was, according to the Baedeker guide for 1866, a "large well-appointed establishment".

Shortly before his death in 1864, John Simpson sold the restaurant to Edmund William Cathie, and in 1865 the business was floated as a limited company. A prospectus was issued for "Simpson's (Ltd)" with capital of £100,000 (equivalent to £10,985,205 as of 2025), to purchase and extend the Divan Tavern. The prospectus stressed the great increase in trade caused by the opening of Charing Cross station nearby, and that Cathie would remain as manager. He employed the British master cook Thomas Davey, who rose through the ranks to head his kitchens. Davey insisted on the thorough and consistent Britishness of Simpson's, including the replacement of the word menu with "Bill of Fare".

In 1898 Richard D'Oyly Carte, proprietor of the Savoy Hotel, acquired Simpson's. Carte died in 1901, and his son Rupert D'Oyly Carte took over the business from 1903, in which year Simpsons was closed for redevelopment. All the old furniture and fittings were sold off, including the largest solid mahogany table in existence, 265 chairs, and 60 other mahogany dining tables. The restaurant reopened in 1904 under the name it bears today, Simpson's-in-the-Strand, Grand Divan.

== 20th century to World War II ==
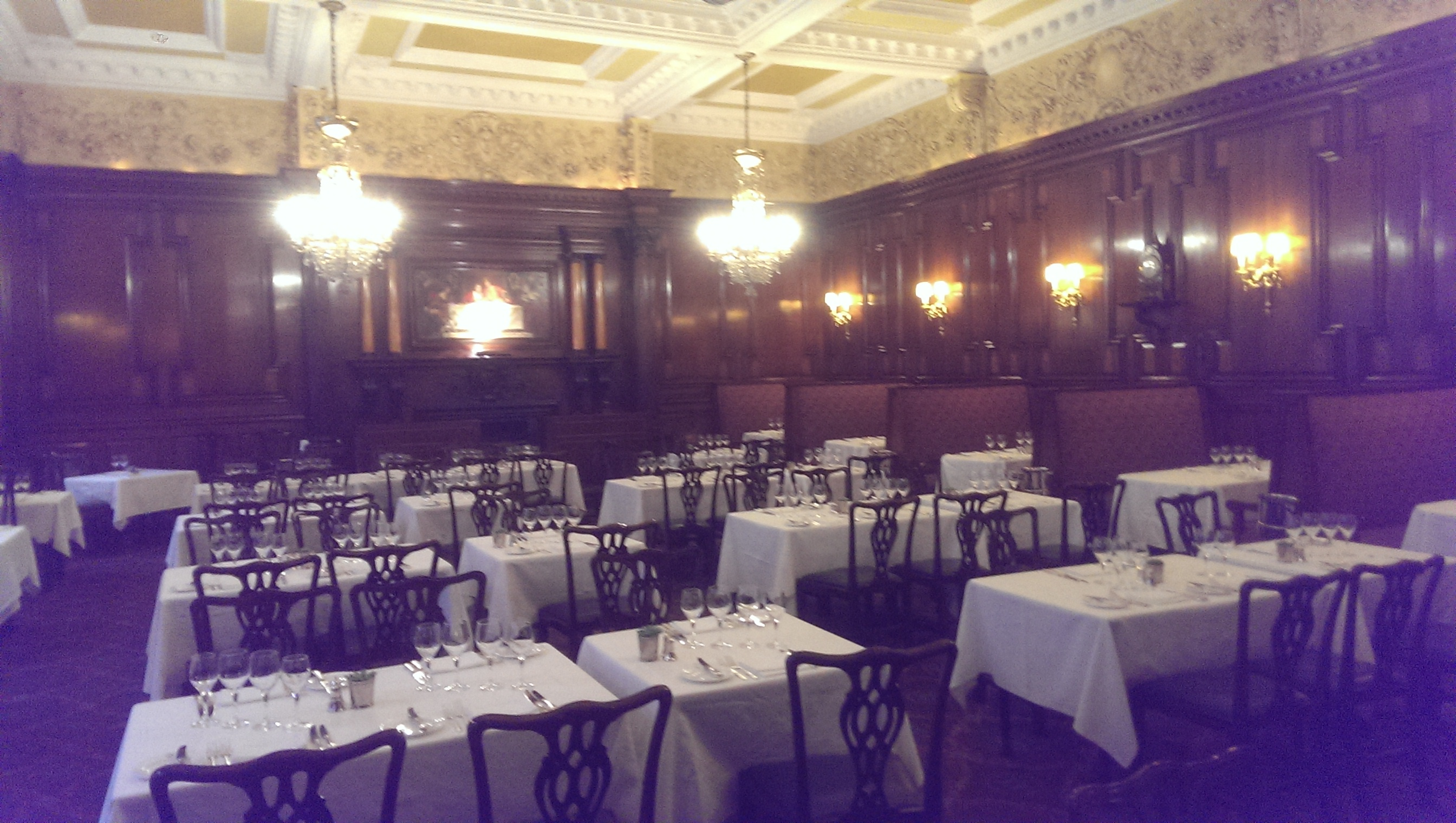
Grand Divan dining room in 2015

Though the premises were updated under the new management, cooking methods remained traditional. In an article in The Times in 1905, details were given of the Simpson's method of cooking beef. "A large open fire is absolutely indispensable, and it must be sufficiently large for every portion of the joint to face the centre or 'red' fire, which will give a steady and ascertained heat during the whole time the joint is revolving and being cooked ... basting must be continuously done. ... Not more than one minute should elapse from the time the joint is taken from the spit until it appears at table."

In 1914 the death of the head chef at Simpson's was a sufficiently noteworthy event that The Times featured the news under the headline "Thomas Davey and his culinary patriotism". The obituary noted that Davey, who died in harness aged 72, had commanded a brigade of 100 men, and that under his supervision 1,400 pounds of English meat, 300 pounds of turbot, 100 pounds of Scotch salmon, and two wagonsful of vegetables were on average prepared for the table every day.

World War I did not at first affect Simpson's supplies, though manpower was scarce. In 1915 P. G. Wodehouse wrote:

Simpson's in the Strand, is unique. Here, if he wishes, the Briton may, for the small sum of half a dollar, stupefy himself with food. The God of Fatted Plenty has the place under his protection. Its keynote is solid comfort. It is a pleasant, soothing, hearty place – a restful temple of food. No strident orchestra forces the diner to bolt beef in ragtime. No long central aisle distracts his attention with its stream of new arrivals. There he sits, alone with his food, while white-robed priests, wheeling their smoking trucks, move to and fro, ever ready with fresh supplies.

Later, however, supplies were rationed. By 1917 all restaurants except the most basic kind were obliged to have a completely meat-free menu one day a week, though Simpson's still offered luxurious fish, including salmon, sole and turbot.

The inter-war years saw another high period for Simpson's. Thirty years later the elderly George Lyttelton reminisced, "Did you never know the agonising choice put before you in the pre-war Simpson's – saddle of mutton or beef ... both perfect of their kind?" It is illustrative of the continuing high profile of the establishment that the death of its long-serving doorman in 1934 was covered in the press: "It is estimated that 'Old Matt' opened the doors of over 2,000,000 private cars, taxicabs, and – in Edwardian days – hansom cabs which drew up outside Simpson's." The head chef of this period was A. W. Willis.

Early in 1939, before the outbreak of World War II, the Savoy Group, now under Rupert D'Oyly Carte, proposed to open a sister restaurant of Simpson's, near Leicester Square, but this took many years to come to fruition. During the war Simpson's was severely hit by the shortage of butchers' meat, their celebrated sirloins of beef and saddles of mutton disappearing from the trolleys, not to be seen again in their full glory until long after the end of the war, as Britain remained on rations until 1954. Partial relief came with an agreement with Cameron of Lochiel to supply his venison from Scotland, as well as herrings for smoking. Simpson's, like all luxury restaurants, was included in the wartime rule imposing a five shilling limit on the price of a restaurant meal.

== After World War II ==
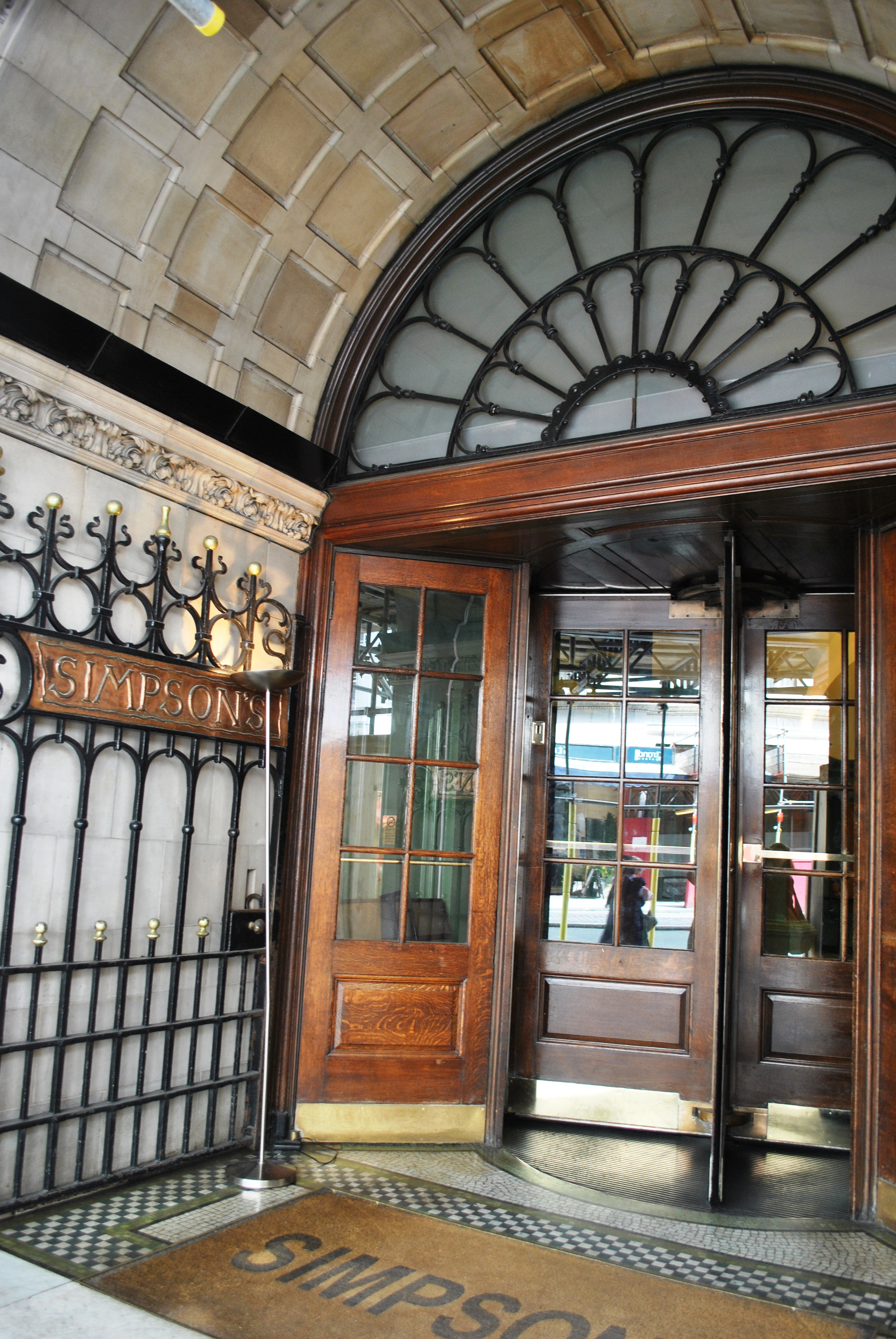
The main entrance

After the war Simpson's, like the rest of the Savoy Group, was hit by a strike of its employees in support of a waiter dismissed from the Savoy Hotel. The matter was judged so serious that the government set up a court of inquiry. After the resolution of that dispute, the next major development in the history of the restaurant was the resuscitation of the pre-war plan to open a sister establishment on the site of Stone's Chop House near Leicester Square. In 1959, Simpson's lost another notable member of its staff. Frederick William Heck died on his way home, having consumed a heavy luncheon, and having completed 55 years' service, 40 years as manager. Ralph R. Smythe, Heck's assistant since 1955, was appointed manager. In 1963, the Savoy group finally achieved its aim from 1939 of opening a second Simpson's at the revived Stone's Chop House.

When the first Michelin Guide to England was published in 1974, no UK restaurant was judged worthy of the maximum three stars, or even two, but Simpson's was one of nine London restaurants, including Le Gavroche, awarded a star. In 1978 Simpson's celebrated its 150th anniversary with a luncheon consisting of all the items from the earliest recorded menu, starting with turtle soup, going on with roast sirloin of beef and saddle of mutton and ending with boiled syrup roll. The next year, mutton had to be dropped from the menu, replaced by lamb because procuring top quality mutton was increasingly difficult, and the meat was no longer fashionable. In 1982, after a thirty-year absence, rabbit was restored to the menu; it was served in a cream and mushroom sauce.

In 1984 Simpson's dropped its rule forbidding women to use the panelled street-level dining-room at lunchtime. Before 1984, they were asked to use the dining room in the floor above, which was specially decorated in pastel colours. Also on the first floor is the richly decorated late-Victorian banqueting room, which can comfortably seat more than 100 people. Another banqueting room on the lower ground floor is in a more modern 1930s style. There were also two cocktail bars, the Knight's Bar on the first floor, a popular Art Deco-styled piano cocktail bar, and a bar in The Bishop's Room, which was only used for functions.

Simpson's was also a popular venue for political dinners, being a favourite of the Western Goals Institute who held a major dinner there for the President of El Salvador, Alfredo Cristiani, and members of his cabinet, on 25 September 1989. The Traditional Britain Group were also patrons for their Annual Dinners, including that held on 8 February 2006, with the guest-of-honour being Simon Heffer. In 1994 Simpson's began serving breakfasts. A light menu was available, but the emphasis was on hearty traditional English breakfasts. The most substantial offering was "The Ten Deadly Sins", consisting of Cumberland sausage, scrambled egg, streaky and back bacon, black pudding, fried mushrooms, baked tomato, kidney, fried bread, bubble & squeak and baked beans. Simpson's was refurbished in 2017 and stopped serving breakfasts during this period.

The Savoy Group was purchased in 1998 by a private equity house, Blackstone Group, and, after further changes of ownership, the Savoy Hotel and Simpson's were split off from the rest of the group in 2005 and are run by Fairmont Hotels and Resorts.

Until 2020, Simpson's dinner specialty was aged Scottish beef on the bone, carved at guests' tables from antique silver-domed trolleys, a tradition that the restaurant maintained for over 150 years. Other signature dishes included potted shrimps, roast saddle of Welsh lamb and steak and kidney pie, accompanied by Yorkshire pudding. The restaurant closed in 2020, due to the COVID-19 pandemic. In 2023, the Savoy auctioned off Simpson's silver trolleys, grand pianos, fireplaces, chandeliers and other furnishings.

In 2026, when King reopened the restaurant, he retrieved several restaurant fixtures at auction, including the fireplaces and their grates. The Grand Divan resumed serving breakfast, including the signature "Ten Deadly Sins". The reopening also marked the return of the domed trolleys and table side carving service. The Knight's Bar on the first floor has been replaced by Simpson's Bar, and the new Nellie's Tavern has been added.

== Simpson's and chess ==
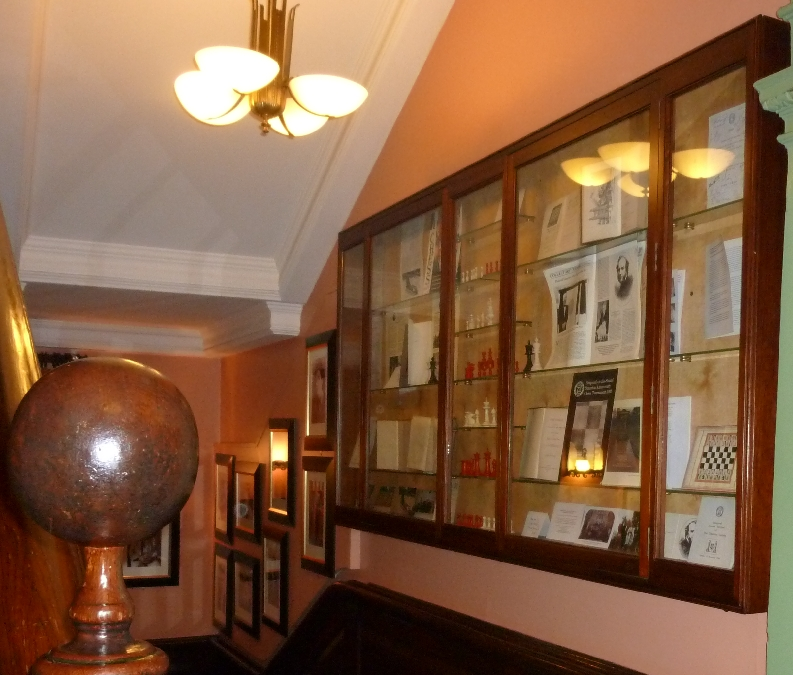
Chess memorabilia on display in the Grand Divan

Many top chess players of the 19th century played there at some stage, including Wilhelm Steinitz, Paul Morphy, Emanuel Lasker, Johannes Zukertort (who had a fatal stroke while playing there), and Siegbert Tarrasch. When the refurbished Simpson's reopened under its new management in 1904, chess was no longer the principal feature. According to The Times, this alone was sufficient to shift the centre of the chess world away from London permanently, with similar clubs in Vienna and Berlin filling its role.

Chess reappeared at Simpson's in 1980, when the finals of the National Chess Club Championship were held there. In September 2003 a small tournament was held at the restaurant to celebrate the 175th anniversary of chess on the site. The tournament was named after the unofficial world champion, during the 1840s and 50s, Howard Staunton, who had played at Simpson's. This sparked a series of such contests that continued annually until 2009. By 2006, the fourth Staunton Memorial was declared the strongest London all-play-all tournament since 1986, with high calibre grandmasters such as Michael Adams, Ivan Sokolov and Jan Timman competing.

In 2026, King appointed Jason Kouchak as the director of chess and music at Simpson's, and blindfold simultaneous chess exhibitions were held, reviving an old tradition.

== In film and literature ==
In The Guns of Navarone, David Niven's character leans over his wounded, dying companion and tells him that when he recovers, they will return to London and go straight to Simpson's to have roast beef. In Alfred Hitchcock's 1936 film Sabotage, characters lunch at Simpson's. In E. M. Forster's Howards End, Henry Wilcox is a devotee of Simpson's. Simpson's also features in the Sherlock Holmes stories, including "The Illustrious Client" and "The Adventure of the Dying Detective", which concludes with Holmes' words: "I think that something nutritious at Simpson's would not be out of place."

P. G. Wodehouse devoted several paragraphs of Something New to the restaurant, and in his novel Psmith in the City, his two heroes dine there: "Psmith waited for Mike while he changed, and carried him off in a cab to Simpson's, a restaurant which, as he justly observed, offered two great advantages, namely, that you need not dress, and, secondly, that you paid your half-crown, and were then at liberty to eat till you were helpless, if you felt so disposed, without extra charge." Simpson's is also featured in Wodehouse's Cocktail Time as the restaurant that one of the characters, Cosmo Wisdom, chooses to lunch at after leaving prison.

== See also ==
- List of restaurants in London
