= Andrew Hunter (British politician) =

British politician

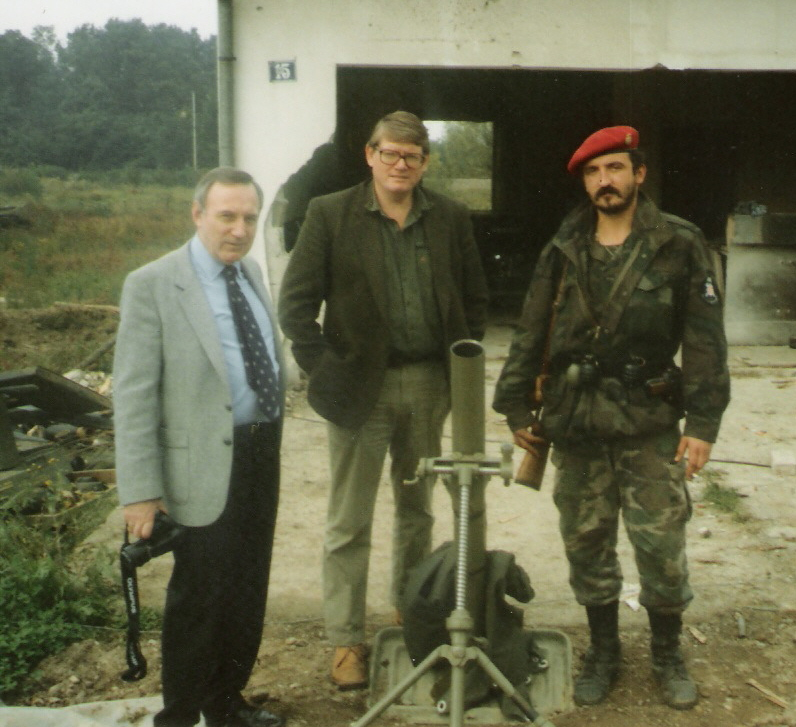
- Hunter (centre) with Denis Walker in 1991

Member of Parliament for Basingstoke
- In office 9 June 1983 – 11 April 2005
- Preceded by: David Mitchell
- Succeeded by: Maria Miller

Personal details
- Born: Andrew Robert Frederick Ebenezer Hunter; 8 January 1943 (age 83) St Albans, Hertfordshire, England
- Party: DUP (2004–05); Independent Conservative (2002–04); Conservative (1983–2002)
- Spouse: Janet Bourne (deceased)
- Children: 2
- Education: University of Durham; Jesus College, Cambridge; Westcott House, Cambridge

Andrew Robert Frederick Ebenezer Hunter (born 8 January 1943) is a British politician and a member of the Orange Order. He was Member of Parliament (MP) for Basingstoke from 1983 until 2005. From 1990 to 2001 he was Vice-Chairman of the Conservative Monday Club and was chairman as of 2008, succeeding Lord Sudeley.

== Early life ==
Hunter is the son of RAF Squadron Leader Roger F Hunter by his marriage to Winifred M Nelson.

He attended St George's School, Harpenden and studied at the University of Durham (St John's College), gaining a BA in Theology in 1966 and an MA in History in 1968. He gained a Diploma in Education from Jesus College, Cambridge in 1967 then studied at Westcott House, Cambridge. Hunter worked as an Assistant Master at St Martin's School, Northwood from 1970–1971 and then joined Harrow School, where he taught until 1983.

== Parliamentary career ==
Hunter contested Southampton Itchen as a Conservative in 1979, but lost to incumbent MP Bob Mitchell. Hunter was first elected to Basingstoke in the 1983 election. He was a member of the Conservative Monday Club and its Vice-Chairman from 1991 to 2001, when he was ordered by the Conservative Party to quit the Club. After retiring as an MP he once again became Deputy-Chairman of the Club and in 2008 succeeded Lord Sudeley as Chairman. Until 2002, he was a patron of the magazine Right Now!.

Hunter was active in thoroughly researching and exposing links of the Irish Republican Army (IRA) with other groups, including the South African African National Congress (ANC), and in July 1988 called for Margaret Thatcher to deport all ANC members then resident in Britain.

In 2002, he withdrew from the Conservative Party in order to contest elections for the Northern Ireland Assembly as a candidate of the Democratic Unionist Party (DUP). He had family and Orange Order connections with Northern Ireland and opposed the Good Friday Agreement. He stood in Lagan Valley in the 2003 Northern Ireland election, but failed to gain a seat, coming seventh in the six-seat constituency.

On 10 December 2004, he announced that he had joined the DUP Parliamentary Group in the House of Commons, the first mainland Member of Parliament in Great Britain to represent a party based in Northern Ireland since T.P. O'Connor, who represented Liverpool Scotland from 1885 to 1929 as an Irish Nationalist.

In February 2005, Hunter raised the case of Jeremy Bamber in Parliament, questioning his conviction for murdering his adoptive family.

Hunter stepped down from the House of Commons at the 2005 general election and suggested he would move to Northern Ireland to become more involved with DUP politics.

It was revealed in 2025 that the leader of the Democratic Unionist Party Ian Paisley had nominated him for a peerage in the House of Lords, however this was rejected by the then Prime Minister of the United Kingdom Tony Blair.

== Personal life ==
He married Janet Bourne in 1972 in Harrow, and they have a son and a daughter. One of his recreations is collecting model soldiers. He is also a member of the Carlton Club.

== Bibliography ==
- Right Now! magazine, (Various editions)
- Young European newsletter, December 1988 edition, published by Western Goals (UK), London.

Parliament of the United Kingdom
| Preceded by David Mitchell | Member of Parliament for Basingstoke; 1983 – 2005 | Succeeded by Maria Miller |
Political offices
| Preceded by Lord Sudeley | Chairman of the Monday Club; December 2007 – July 2024 | Succeeded by Club closed |
