= Merlin Hanbury-Tracy, 7th Baron Sudeley =

British peer and author (1939–2022)

The Right Honourable The Lord Sudeley
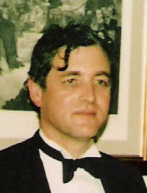
- Baron Sudeley in 1987

Member of the House of Lords
- Lord Temporal
- Hereditary peer 17 June 1960 – 11 November 1999

Personal details
- Born: 17 June 1939
- Died: 5 September 2022 (aged 83)
- Party: Conservative
- Spouse(s): The Hon Elizabeth Villiers (m. 1980; div. 1988) Margarita née Danko (m. 1999; div. 2006) Tatiana Dudina (m. 2010)
- Parent(s): Michael Hanbury-Tracy (father); Colline Amabel St Hill (mother)
- Education: Worcester College, Oxford University of Oxford
- Occupation: Politician, author, activist

Merlin Charles Sainthill Hanbury-Tracy, 7th Baron Sudeley, FSA (17 June 1939 – 5 September 2022) was a British hereditary peer, author, and far-right activist. In 1941, at the age of two, he succeeded his first cousin once removed, Richard Hanbury-Tracy, 6th Baron Sudeley, to the Barony of Sudeley. Until the 1999 reforms to the House of Lords, he regularly sat as a hereditary peer. He was a member of the Conservative Party all his adult life.

== Early life and education ==
Merlin Hanbury-Tracy was born on 17 June 1939 to Captain Michael Hanbury-Tracy, a Scots Guards officer, who died from wounds received at Dunkirk, and Colline Annabel, only daughter of Lieutenant-Colonel Collis George Herbert St. Hill, the Royal North Devon Hussars, commander of the 2/5 battalion of Sherwood Foresters, who was also killed by a sniper at Villers-Plouich, France, on 8 July 1917.

Hanbury-Tracy attended Eton College, one of England's premier public schools. He later graduated in history from Worcester College, Oxford. Hanbury-Tracy was also sometimes an adjunct lecturer at the University of Bristol. He served his National Service obligations in the ranks of the Scots Guards.

== Political activity ==
Lord Sudeley was a member of the House of Lords for 39 years. He inherited his peerage aged 2, and finally took his seat in the House at the age of 21. He was a regular attender and introduced several measures, most notably the Bill to prevent the unlicensed export of historical manuscripts and, in 1981, a Bill to uphold the Book of Common Prayer.

From the early 1970s, Sudeley was active in the Conservative Monday Club of which he became President in February 1991. In 1985 he was elected a Vice-Chancellor of the reactionary International Monarchist League.

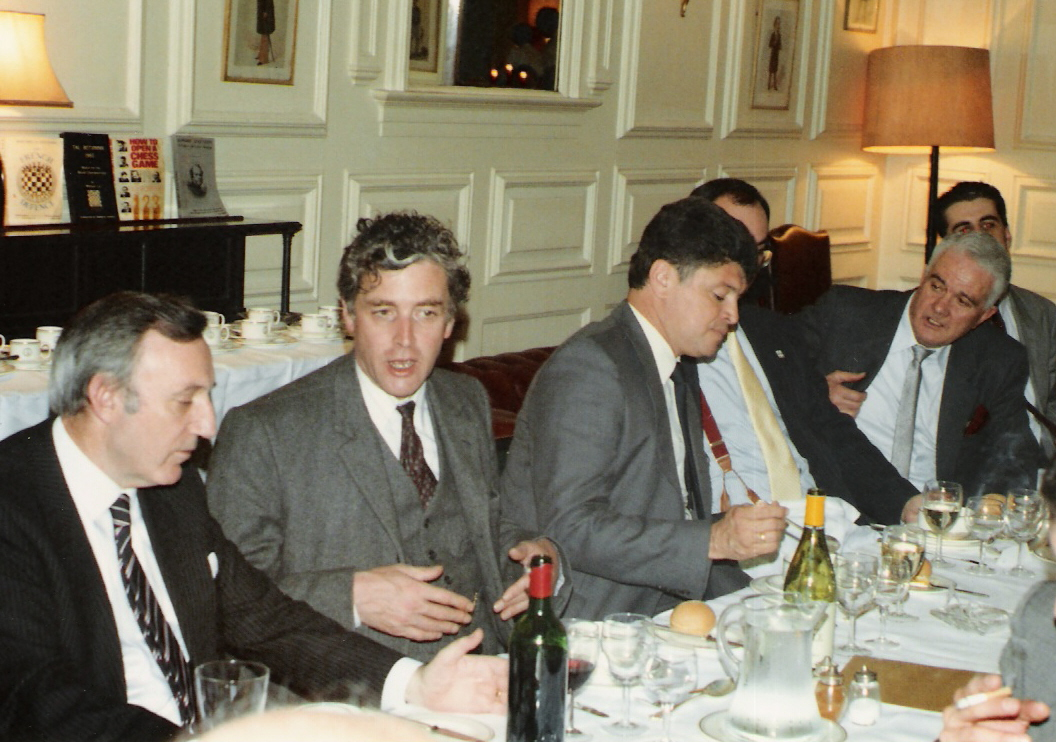
At the Western Goals Institute 'El Salvador' Dinner, London, 25 September 1989. L to R: Denis Walker, Sudeley, José Manuel Pacas Castro (El Salvador's Foreign Minister), Andrew Smith (yellow tie), Dr. Harvey Ward.

Sudeley was President of the far-right Traditional Britain Group until his death. He was also a vice-president of now-defunct far-right think tank the Western Goals Institute, which campaigned in support of apartheid in South Africa and formed close ties with violent anti-communist groups including the Nationalist Republican Alliance in El Salvador.

Lord Sudeley was Patron of the Bankruptcy Association (Lloyds Bank had foreclosed upon Charles Hanbury-Tracy, 4th Baron Sudeley in 1893, when his debt was covered twice over by large assets) and Convenor of the Forum for Stable Currencies. He was also Lay Patron of the Prayer Book Society and a past President of the Powysland Club.

=== Expulsion from the House of Lords ===
Sudeley was one of the unelected hereditary peers expelled from the Upper House by the House of Lords Act 1999. Faced with losing his hereditary position, Sudeley opposed reforms to the House of Lords. Sudeley believed that the House of Lords should be left unreformed, declaring that "If it isn't broken, why mend it?" He also said that since he believed inherited titles were "inextricably" tied to the monarchy, it was "odd that they just want to touch one institution and not the other". He also claimed that the House of Lords had developed a "wealth of experience".

=== Racism and praise of Hitler ===
Sudeley has been described as a far-right activist.

His reputation was affected by racist comments he made in speeches and reports. On 2 June 2006, The Times quoted him as stating, in a report of the Monday Club's Annual General Meeting, that "Hitler did well to get everyone back to work". It also reported him saying that "True though the fact may be that some races are superior to others", and it was suggested that such comments may have interfered with the Monday Club's hopes of being accepted back into Conservative Party circles.

In September 2001, the Conservative Party leadership candidate Iain Duncan Smith said the Monday Club was a "viable organisation… in a sense what the party is about". However, six weeks later, after becoming leader, he publicly distanced the party from the Monday Club until it ceased to "promulgate or discuss policies relating to race"; he also indicated that no Conservative MPs should contribute to Right Now!, a quarterly magazine of which Lord Sudeley was a Patron, after an article in it described Nelson Mandela as a "terrorist".

== Hobbies ==
Lord Sudeley once described in Who's Who one of his hobbies as "Ancestor Worship", with "Conversation" being listed in Debrett's. He took great pride in the former family seat of Toddington Manor in Gloucestershire, which the family had been forced to sell in the late 19th century. In its successful blend of the Perpendicular Gothic and Picturesque styles, Toddington was the fore-runner of the Houses of Parliament, and the soon-to-be 1st Lord Sudeley was selected as chairman of the new parliamentary committee to settle upon the design. His contributions, based upon Toddington's, were accepted and enhanced.

At Easter 1985, in conjunction with the century-old Manorial Society of Great Britain (of which he sat on the Governing Council), Sudeley held a conference at his old home, the proceedings published in a volume entitled The Sudeleys - Lords of Toddington, taking the history of his family back to Thomas Becket's murder and ultimately to Charlemagne. On 21 November 2006, he arranged a further conference at the Society of Antiquaries of London on "Visual Aspects of Toddington in the 19th century".

== Publications ==
Lord Sudeley has written many published essays, including a history of the English gentleman for a German pharmaceutical magazine, Die Waage. In 1971 he wrote The Role of Heredity in Politics and when his friend Viscount Masserene and Ferrard wrote his book on The Lords, Sudeley reviewed it in Monday World. In December 1979, his essay on Lords Reform - why tamper with the House of Lords was published as a Policy Paper by the Conservative Monday Club, and in 1991 the Club published his booklet The Preservation of the House of Lords which carried a Foreword by Sir John Stokes, M.P.

He also wrote a history of the House of Lords in which he promoted its Tory (as opposed to Whig history) interpretation, entitled Peers Through the Mist of Time. A launch for his book took place at Brooks's in London on 28 September 2018. In his 2021 book Toddington, the Unforgotten Forerunner, Sudeley tells the story of his family's former seat, designed in a blend of Perpendicular Gothic and Picturesque by Charles Hanbury-Tracy, later Chairman of the Commission for the Rebuilding of the Houses of Parliament in the same style, and its tragic and unexplained loss. He is also the author of a satire on Greek mythology (published in John Pudney's famous Pick of Today's Short Stories) and a quantity of politically incorrect short stories mostly published in the London Miscellany magazine. In his later years Sudeley style-edited a definitive monograph on Azerbaijan's architecture, translated from the Russian.

== Personal life ==
Lord Sudeley lived in a mansion flat in Dorset Square, Westminster. He was married three times and divorced twice.

Sudeley married his first wife on 18 January 1980 (dissolved 1988), Elizabeth Mairi Villiers (3 November 1941 – 29 September 2014), daughter of Derek William Charles Keppel, Viscount Bury (heir-apparent of the 9th Earl of Albemarle) and Lady Mairi Vane-Tempest-Stewart (youngest daughter of the 7th Marquess of Londonderry, and ex-wife of Alastair Michael Hyde Villiers, a Partner in Panmure Gordon & Company, stockbrokers.

Sudeley was married secondly in 1999 (dissolved 2006) to Margarita (born 1962), daughter of Nikolai Danko, and former wife of Lloyd's of London broker Nigel Kellett.

Sudeley married a third time, in 2010, Dr Tatiana Dudina (born 19 August 1950), daughter of Russian Colonel Boris Dudin and Galina Veselovskaya. Dr Dudina holds a doctorate in philology from Moscow State Linguistic University.

=== Death ===
Sudeley died on 5 September 2022, at the age of 83. He was succeeded as Baron Sudeley by his third cousin once removed, Nicholas Hanbury-Tracy.

== Arms ==
Coat of arms of Merlin Hanbury-Tracy, 7th Baron Sudeley
Crest "1st, on a chapeau gules, turned up ermine, an escallop sable, between two wings or; 2nd, out of a mural coronet sable, a demi-lion rampant or, holding in the paws a battle-axe sable, helved gold." Escutcheon "Quarterly: 1st and 4th or, an escallop in the chief point sable, between two bendlets gules (Tracy); 2nd and 3rd or, a bend engrailed vert plain cotised sable" (Hanbury). Supporters "On either side a falcon, wings elevated proper, beaked and belled or." Motto Memoria Pii Æterna "The pious are held in everlasting remembrance" Badge "A fire beacon, and in front thereof and chained thereto a panther ducally gorged, the tail nowed."

== Sources ==
- Copping, Robert, The Monday Club - Crisis and After May 1975, page 25, published by the Current Affairs Information Service, Ilford, Essex, (P/B).
- Sudeley, The Rt. Hon. The Lord, Lords Reform - Why Tamper with the House of Lords, Monday Club publication, December 1979, (P/B).
- Sudeley, The Rt. Hon. The Lord, A Guide to Hailes Church, nr. Winchcombe, Gloucester, 1980, (P/B), ISBN 0-7140-2058-3
- Sudeley, The Rt. Hon.The Lord, The Role of Hereditary in Politics, in The Monarchist, January 1982, no.60, Norwich, England.
- Sudeley, The Rt. Hon.The Lord, Becket's Murderer - William de Tracy, in Family History magazine, Canterbury, August 1983, vol.13, no.97, pps: 3 - 36.
- Sudeley, the Rt. Hon.The Lord, essays in The Sudeleys - Lords of Toddington, published by the Manorial Society of Great Britain, London, 1987,(P/B)
- Sudeley, The Rt. Hon.The Lord, The Preservation of The House of Lords Monday Club, London, 1991, (P/B).
- London Evening Standard newspaper, 27 March 1991 - article: An heir of neglect - A Life in the Home of Lord Sudeley (pps:32-33).
- Births, Deaths & Marriages, Family Record Centre, Islington, London.
- Mosley, Charles, (editor) Burke's Peerage, Baronetage, & Knightage 106th edition, Switzerland, (1999), ISBN 2-940085-02-1
- Sudeley, The Rt. Hon.The Lord, The Sudeley Bankruptcy in London Miscellany June 1999 edition.
- OK! magazine, London, issue 175, 20 August 1999, (7-page report on his wedding).
- Mitchell, Austin, M.P., Farewell My Lords, London, 1999, (P/B), ISBN 1-902301-43-9
- Gliddon, Gerald, The Aristocracy and The Great War, Norwich, 2002, ISBN 0-947893-35-0
- Sudeley, The Rt. Hon.The Lord, Usery or Taking Interest for Lending Money, published by the Forum for Stable Currencies, 2004, (P/B).
- Perry, Maria, The House in Berkeley Square, London, 2003.

Political offices
Preceded by Mark Mayall	Chairman of the Monday Club; May 1993 – December 2007	Succeeded by Andrew Hunter
Peerage of the United Kingdom
Preceded by Richard Hanbury-Tracy	Baron Sudeley; 1941–2022	Succeeded by Nicholas Hanbury-Tracy
