= List of Conservative Monday Club publications =

This is a list of publications of the Conservative Monday Club, a prominent Tory political pressure-group in the United Kingdom.

== Booklets ==
- A Personal Record, (of rejection of socialism, &c.,) by John Braine, December 1968.
- Ireland - Our Cuba? by Jeremy Harwood, the Hon. Jonathan Guinness and John Biggs-Davison, MP 1970
- Capital - Yours or Theirs?, by the club's Taxation Group, Chairman: A. P. Leslie, February 1970.
- Rents - Chaos or Commonsense?, by Horace Cutler 1970.
- Standing Room Only - The Population Problem in Britain, by Geoffrey Baber. 1971.
- Some Uncivil Liberties by Cllr.Sam Swerling. 1971.
- Education and the Permissive Society, by Clive Buckmaster, early 1970s
- ''Europe's Back Door: The Soviet Maritime Threat, by Patrick Wall, MP, early 1970s. ISBN 0-903900-02-5. 1973
- The Enemies Within, by Commodore Anthony T. Courtney, OBE, RN (Retd), (MP, for Harrow East (UK Parliament constituency) 1959-1966), with a foreword by the Hon. Jonathan Guinness. 1972.
- The Crooked Conscience - Are the Churches Politically 'Bent'?, by Bernard Smith. 1972.
- Who's Getting at Our Kids?, by Cllr. Sam Swerling. ISBN 0-903900-00-9. 1972.
- State & Economy - Need for a Tory Rethink, by the club's Economic Policy Group. ISBN 0-903900-01-7. 1972.
- When the Bough Breaks, John Peter Preece Smith, ISBN 0-903900-03-3 circa 1973.
- Thoughts on Defence, by Anthony Courtney, MP, for Harrow East, 1959-1966], David Pilleau, & Peter Langley. July 1974.
- Local Rates, by Cllr.Brian Costello, mid-1970s.
- Towards a Solution, by Julian Amery, MP, 1975.
- Rhodesia & The Threat to The West, by the Rt.Hon. Julian Amery, MP, John Biggs-Davison, MP, Harold Soref (former MP) and Patrick Wall, MC, MP 1976.
- Europe - The Unguarded Legacy, by John Young and the club's European Policy Group, with a foreword by the Rt Hon Julian Amery, MP, and introduction by John Biggs-Davison, MP 1978.
- Who's Afraid of Laissez Faire?, by David Hart, 1980. ISBN 0-903900-05-X.
- The Price of Peace, by Brian Crozier, 1980 [Club were distributors only]
- Communist Propaganda Apparatus and Other Threats to The Media by Sir James Goldsmith – a booklet containing his statement to the Media Committee of the Conservative Party at the House of Commons, 21 January 1981. [Club were distributors only.]
- Immigration, Repatriation, and the C.R.E., by K. Harvey Proctor, MP, John R. Pinniger, MA, with a foreword by Sir Ronald Bell, QC, MP 1981.
- The Conservative Party and the Common Market, by David Storey and Teddy Taylor, MP July 1982.
- Recall to Greatness, by John Murray, mid-1980s.
- The Preservation of The House of Lords, by the Rt.Hon.The Lord Sudeley, with a foreword by Sir John Stokes, MP 1991.House of Lords (pdf)

== Other publications ==
- "The Challenger" journal of the Scottish Monday Club
- "Right Hook", quarterly journal of the Young Monday Club. Editor in Spring 1979 was Eleanor Dodd.
- "Tory News", occasional newsletter
- "Tory Challenge" quarterly journal of the National Monday Club. Editor in 1980 was Clive Buckmaster.
- "Monday World", glossy magazine, (editorial board in 1981: Eleanor Dodd (editor), Cllr. Sam Swerling (former editor), David Storey, John R. Pinniger, Graham Mather, John de Vere Walker).
- "Monday News" quarterly newsletter (editor in November 1981 was Eleanor Dodd).
- "Right Ahead" 'Conservative & Unionist' occasional newspaper, notably the annual Conservative Party Conference editions. The Summer 1986 edition carries and impressive line-up of writers of whom many are MPs. The 1985 editorial board consisted of: David Storey (editor, and club chairman), Cedric Gunnery (a club co-founder, director and treasurer), George Gardiner, MP, and Teddy Taylor, MP.
- "Monday Club News" regular newsletter, 1989 on, edited by Gregory Lauder-Frost (1989-1992).
