= Bolsón =

Bolsón may refer to:

Geography:

- Bolsón Cove, at the head of Flandres Bay, east of Etienne Fjord, on the west coast of Graham Land
- Bolsón de Mapimí, endorheic river basin located in the center-north of the Mexican Plateau
- Cerro del Bolsón, mountain in the Aconquija Range of Argentina, in Tucumán province
- El Bolsón, Río Negro, town situated in the southwest of Río Negro Province, Argentina
- El Bolsón, Catamarca, village and municipality in Catamarca Province in northwestern Argentina

Zoology:

- Bolsón night lizard (Xantusia bolsonae), a species of night lizard endemic to the Mexican state of Durango
- Bolson pupfish (Cyprinodon atrorus), a species of fish in the family Cyprinodontidae
- Bolson tortoise (Gopherus flavomarginatus), a species of tortoise from North America

== See also ==
- Bolson
- Belson
- Bilson
- Blouson
- Bolozon
- Bulson
- Polson (disambiguation)
