= Bilson =

Bilson is a surname, and may refer to:

- Bruce Bilson (1928–2026), American film and television director
- Carly Bilson (born 1981), Australian rowing coxwain
- Danny Bilson (born 1956), American writer, director, and producer
- John Bilson (disambiguation), various people
- Leonard Bilson (disambiguation), various people
- Malcolm Bilson (born 1935), American pianist and musicologist
- Rachel Bilson (born 1981), American actress
- Sundance Bilson-Thompson, Australian theoretical particle physicist.
- Thomas Bilson (disambiguation), various people

== See also ==
- Billson
