= 1988 Epping Forest by-election =

1988 UK Parliamentary by-election

- 15 December 1988

Constituency of Epping Forest
- Turnout: 49.1% (▼27.2%)
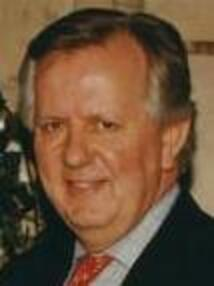
	First party	Second party
		SLD
Candidate	Steven Norris	Andrew Thompson
Party	Conservative	SLD
Popular vote	13,183	8,679
Percentage	39.5%	26.0%
Swing	▼21.5%	▲6.6%
	Third party	Fourth party
	Lab	SDP
Candidate	Stephen Murray	Michael Pettman
Party	Labour	SDP
Popular vote	6,261	4,077
Percentage	18.7%	12.2%
Swing	▲0.4%	N/A
MP before election
John Biggs-Davison
Conservative
Subsequent MP
Steven Norris
Conservative

A by-election was held in the British House of Commons constituency of Epping Forest on 15 December 1988, following the death of Conservative Member of Parliament (MP) Sir John Biggs-Davison. The result was a hold for the Conservative Party.

== Candidates ==
Steven Norris was the Conservative candidate. Norris had been elected to serve as MP for Oxford East at the 1983 general election but had lost the seat in 1987. His opponent from the Labour Party was Stephen Murray. Andrew Thompson was chosen as the candidate for the recently formed Social and Liberal Democrats. Thompson had been a founder member of the Social Democratic Party (SDP) and had served as a councillor in the local area since 1984. His main campaign issues were saving a local hospital from closure and defending the green belt status of Epping Forest.

The rump SDP, which had rejected the merger with the Liberal Party, also put forward a candidate, Michael Pettman. Pettman, a solicitor and local councillor, had been the candidate for the SDP in Epping Forest at the 1983 general election. Both the Green Party, represented by Andrew Simms and the Official Monster Raving Loony Party, represented by party leader and serial election candidate David Sutch, contested the election as well. Sutch stood under the name "Monster Raving Loony - Liberal Birthday Party" in this election.

Tina Wingfield stood under the designation of "Independent National Front" although at the time she was actually a member of the National Council of the Flag Group, a breakaway party from the NF. Other candidates were Jackie Moore for the Rainbow Alliance (who added the name Change the World to her party designation) and Brian Goodier, who stood as the "Vote no Belsen for South Africans" candidate.

== Result ==
1988 Epping Forest by-election
Party	Candidate	Votes	%	±%
Conservative	Steven Norris	13,183	39.5	−21.5
SLD	Andrew Thompson	8,679	26.0	+6.6
Labour	Stephen Murray	6,261	18.7	+0.4
SDP	Michael Pettman	4,077	12.2	N/A
Green	Andrew Simms	672	2.0	N/A
Independent National Front	Tina Wingfield	286	0.6	N/A
Monster Raving Loony	David Sutch	208	0.6	N/A
Rainbow Alliance - Change the World	Jackie Moore	33	0.1	N/A
Vote no Belsen for South Africans	Brian Goodier	16	0.0	N/A
Majority		4,504	13.5	N/A
Turnout		33,415	49.1	−27.2
Conservative hold		Swing		

Candidate Brian Goodier misspelt Belson on his nomination paper.

== See also ==
- Lists of United Kingdom by-elections
