= Belsen (disambiguation) =

Belsen can mean:

- Bergen-Belsen concentration camp
- Bergen-Belsen displaced persons camp
- Belsen (Bergen), a small village near Bergen, about 25 km north of Celle in northern Germany. The camps were named after this village.
- Other places:
  - Belsen, a suburb of Mössingen in Landkreis Tübingen in Baden-Württemberg, Germany: see de:Belsen (Mössingen)
  - Belsener Kapelle, one of the oldest Romanesque choir tower churches in Baden-Württemberg. It is in Belsen (Mössingen). See de:Belsener Kapelle
  - Belsenberg, a hill 256 meters high near Künzelsau in Baden-Württemberg: see de:Künzelsau

== See also ==
- Bahlsen, a German food company based in Hanover
- Belses, a village in Scotland
- Bełżec extermination camp and Bełżec town, in Poland
- Bolsena, a place in Italy
- El Bolsón (disambiguation), Spanish place names
- Velsen, a place in the Netherlands
- The surname Abelson
- The surname Bellson
