= Steven Norris =

British politician (born 1945)

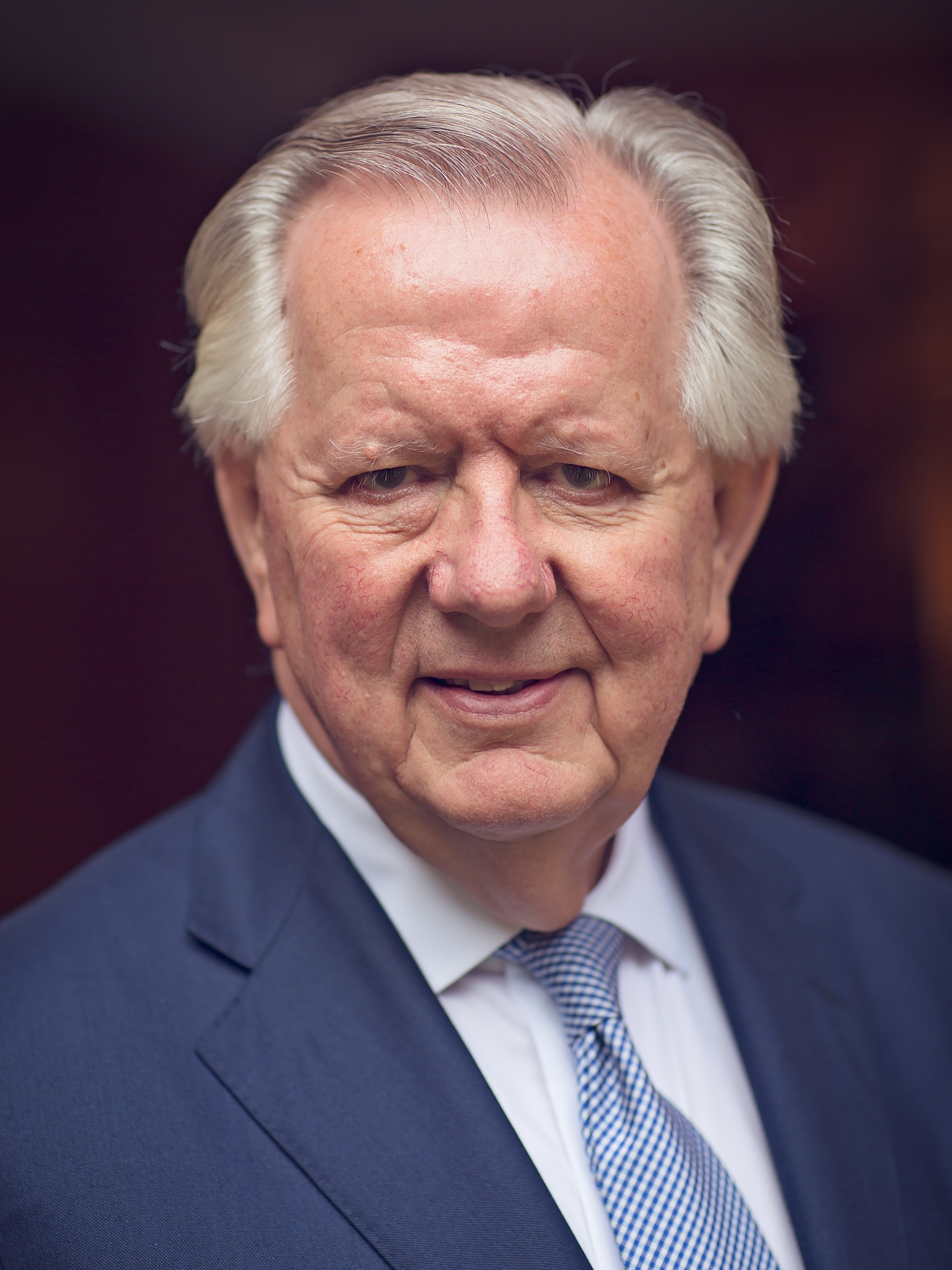
- Norris in 2016

Parliamentary Under-Secretary of State for Transport
- In office 14 April 1992 – 23 July 1996
- Prime Minister: John Major
- Preceded by: Christopher Chope; Patrick McLoughlin
- Succeeded by: John Bowis

Member of Parliament for Epping Forest
- In office 15 December 1988 – 8 April 1997
- Preceded by: Sir John Biggs-Davison
- Succeeded by: Eleanor Laing

Member of Parliament for Oxford East
- In office 9 June 1983 – 18 May 1987
- Preceded by: Constituency established
- Succeeded by: Andrew Smith

Personal details
- Born: Steven John Norris; 24 May 1945 (age 81) Liverpool, England
- Party: Conservative
- Education: Liverpool Institute for Boys; Worcester College, Oxford
- Website: stevenorris.co.uk

Steven John Norris (born 24 May 1945) is a British former politician and businessman. A member of the Conservative Party, he served as the Member of Parliament (MP) for Oxford East from 1983 to 1987. After narrowly losing that marginal seat he re-entered the House of Commons at a by-election for Epping Forest in 1988, which he held until stepping down to focus on his business career in 1997. Norris was subsequently chosen by Conservative Party members to be their candidate for Mayor of London in 2000 and 2004 in which he secured 42% and 45% of the vote respectively, coming second to Ken Livingstone on both occasions.

== Early life and career ==
Norris attended the Liverpool Institute for Boys, a grammar school, from 1956 to 1963 where he was Head Boy. He earned an open Exhibition in Social Studies and graduated from Worcester College, Oxford, where he was president of the University Law Society. After graduating, he pursued a career in the engineering and motor industries and entered politics upon election to Berkshire County Council in 1977, where he became deputy leader.

== Parliamentary and ministerial career ==
In 12 years as member of parliament, Norris was appointed Parliamentary private secretary to William Waldegrave, at the Department of the Environment; to Nicholas Ridley at the Department of Trade and Industry; and to Kenneth Baker at the Home Office. He was then promoted to Minister for Transport in London by John Major in 1992, where he was responsible for the Jubilee line Extension, the largest extension of the London Underground network to date, as well as the privatisation of London bus services.

== Public transport roles ==
Norris's expertise on public transport issues led him to roles as chairman of the National Cycling Strategy Board, director general of the Road Haulage Association and president of the Motor Cycle Industry Association, and a commissioner with the Independent Transport Commission. He also served as patron of the cyclists charity, Sustrans, and of the Campaign for Better Transport (UK) Trust.

== Equality issues ==
Norris was a pioneer for equality for gays and lesbians before the law as a member of parliament and later as a mayoral candidate. In particular, Norris took the step of writing to the Conservative Party Chairman Chris Patten to suggest that the party include an equal age of consent in its next election manifesto. This change in the law was eventually achieved in 2001 under the Blair government.

Additionally, Norris registered the Conservative Parliamentary Group for Homosexual Law Reform with the party's whips office and the 1922 Committee. Realising that the party would not make a manifesto commitment to age of consent equality, the group decided to lobby individual ministers and departments with an agenda for change. This included a review of the 1967 Sexual Offences Act to allow for an equal age of consent, as well as allowing gays and lesbians to serve openly in the armed forces; supporting a more liberal prosecution policy in Scotland; enforcement of existing Home Office advice against police entrapment and a more positive image for the Conservative Party on equality issues. Norris also was one of a handful of prominent Tories who lobbied against Section 28, intended by its supporters to outlaw the teaching of homosexuality in schools, which later was repealed by the Blair government and renounced by the Conservative Party under David Cameron. At the time of repeal, Norris opposed then leader William Hague’s support of the measure.

== London mayoral bids ==
=== 2000 ===
LAC Mayor for London debate, March 1998 with Jeffrey Archer, Margaret Hodge, and Steven Norris.

In September 1999, Norris contested Jeffrey Archer for the Conservative Party nomination for Mayor of London. Archer was initially selected as the candidate by party members, but was forced to withdraw later that year after it was revealed that he had committed perjury in a libel case. Archer was subsequently convicted of the crime and imprisoned. Norris was then selected as the Conservative Party candidate in a ballot of members in December of that year, going on to earn 42% of the vote against duly-elected London Mayor Ken Livingstone.

=== 2004 ===
In November 2002, Norris formally announced his intention to run again for the London mayoralty. In February 2003, he was again selected as the party's candidate in a ballot of London party members. His platform included plans for after-hours London Underground services and an approach to crime based on the 'broken windows' theory that had been championed by New York City mayor Rudy Giuliani. Norris had met Giuliani during the campaign, and proposed an agreement with Giuliani Partners to advise him as mayor, should Norris be successful.

=== 2008 ===
Following speculation that he might run again for the mayoralty in 2008, and the extension of the party's deadline for nominations in the hope of attracting a heavyweight candidate, Norris said in an interview that "If I run, I'll win", but ultimately chose not to apply. Subsequently, Boris Johnson became the party's candidate.

== Business career ==
He is one of Property Week's Property Power 100 and is chairman of Soho Estates, which controls around 60 acres of London's Soho district. He is also chairman of London Resort Company Holdings, developers of the £3.5 billion entertainment resort project on Swanscombe Peninsula in Kent. He was Independent Non-Executive Chairman of This Land Limited, Cambridgeshire County Council's arms- length property company from 2019 – 2022. He is Chairman of Future-Built Limited, a construction company, and of EVO.PM, a proptech maintenance company. He is also a partner with Craig Calder in Sanctuary Investments Limited.

In the infrastructure sector, he is chair of the Council of the National Infrastructure Planning Association and chairman of Driver Group plc. In the field of transportation, he was a member of the board of Transport for London under Mayor Boris Johnson. He is deputy chairman of bus manufacturer Optare. He was a main board member of Cubic Corporation of San Diego, California, a defence and transportation technology specialist, serving from 2014 until 2021, when the company was sold to Elliott and Veritas Capital. He remains an advisor to the UK business. He is Chairman of Evtec Automotive Limited, a tier 1 supplier principally serving Jaguar Land Rover. He was appointed chairman of Jarvis in 2003.

== Current voluntary roles ==
Norris is a former chairman of the Prince Michael International Road Safety Awards, currently a vice-president of both the Royal National Institute for the Deaf and the Institute of Advanced Motorists, a patron of The Urology Foundation and chairman of the Surrey Canal Sports Foundation. He is an Eminent Fellow of the Royal Institution of Chartered Surveyors, Fellow of the Chartered Institute of Logistics and Transport, Fellow of the Chartered Institute of Highways and Transportation, a Fellow of the Institution of Civil Engineers and an Honorary Fellow of the Association for Project Management. He is also president of Intelligent Transport Systems UK (ITS UK), the national industry association for transport technology. He holds an honorary doctorate of laws from the University of East London.

Parliament of the United Kingdom
New constituency	Member of Parliament for Oxford East; 1983–1987	Succeeded by Andrew Smith
Preceded by Sir John Biggs-Davison	Member of Parliament for Epping Forest; 1988–1997	Succeeded by Eleanor Laing
