= Epping Forest (constituency) =

UK Parliament constituency (since 1974)

Coordinates: 51.67°N 0.09°E

- County constituency for the House of Commons
- Interactive map of boundaries sinc 2010
- Location within the East of England
- County: Essex
- Electorate: 74,553 (March 2020)
- Major settlements: Epping, Waltham Abbey, Loughton, Chigwell, Buckhurst Hill

Current constituency
- Created: 1974
- Member of Parliament: Neil Hudson (Conservative)
- Seats: One
- Created from: Epping; Chigwell

Epping Forest is a constituency (Note: A county constituency (for the purposes of election expenses and type of returning officer)) in Essex, created for the February 1974 general election from parts of the abolished Epping and Chigwell constituencies. It has been represented in the House of Commons of the UK Parliament since 2024 by Neil Hudson of the Conservative Party. (Note: As with all constituencies, the constituency elects one Member of Parliament (MP) by the first past the post system of election at least every five years.)

== Constituency profile ==
Situated immediately to the north-east of the Greater London administrative boundary, the constituency is named after, and contains most of, Epping Forest, the ancient woodland owned by the City of London Corporation that forms a green corridor along London's northeastern fringe.

The constituency is largely suburban in character, containing towns in the north-east of the urban area of London, as well as extensive areas of the Metropolitan Green Belt, including the majority of Epping Forest itself. It is served by several stations on the Central line of the London Underground.

Its largest town is Loughton, which has a population of around 33,000. Much of Loughton was developed after the Second World War to accommodate the London overspill. The constituency's other major towns include Waltham Abbey, Chigwell, Epping and Buckhurst Hill.

The constituency is generally affluent and house prices are higher than national averages. Residents of Epping Forest have average levels of education, high rates of household income and are more likely to work in professional occupations compared to the rest of the country.

White people made up 81% of the population at the 2021 census. Asians (primarily Indians) were the largest ethnic minority group at 9%, concentrated mainly in Chigwell.

Voters in Epping Forest strongly supported leaving the European Union in the 2016 referendum; an estimated 62% voted in favour of Brexit compared to 52% nationwide.

Most of the constituency is represented by Conservatives at the local council level, although Loughton is mostly represented by a local residents' association.

== History ==
The seat was created for the February 1974 general election, primarily from part of the abolished constituency of Chigwell, together with parts of the abolished constituency of Epping, which was notably the seat held by Winston Churchill from 29 October 1924 – 15 June 1945.

When Epping Forest was first created, it was more favourable to the Conservatives than the old Epping seat, as it lost the new town of Harlow (part of the old Epping Rural District) and gained the more Conservative Chigwell Urban District. During the Thatcher period the Labour Party's vote was crushed. Even though the Liberals managed to move into second place, their vote did little more than follow national trends and as soon as 1987 their votes dropped away as well.

Two former candidates in the Epping Forest constituency have also stood for election as Mayor of London: Steve Norris (Conservative; MP 1988–97) and Julian Leppert (British National Party).

== Boundaries and boundary changes ==
=== Historic ===
==== 1974–1983 ====
- The Urban Districts of Chigwell, Epping, and Waltham Holy Cross; and
- The Rural District of Epping and Ongar parishes of Epping Upland, Theydon Bois, and Theydon Garnon.

The majority of the new constituency, comprising the Urban District of Chigwell (incorporating Buckhurst Hill and Loughton), had previously been part of the abolished constituency of Chigwell. Remaining parts had previously been in the abolished constituency of Epping.

==== 1983–1997 ====
- The District of Epping Forest wards of Broadway, Buckhurst Hill East, Buckhurst Hill West, Chigwell Row, Chigwell Village, Debden Green, Epping Hemnall, Epping Lindsey, Grange Hill, High Beach, Loughton Forest, Loughton Roding, Loughton St John's, Loughton St Mary's, Paternoster, Theydon Bois, Waltham Abbey East, and Waltham Abbey West.

Minor loss to Brentwood and Ongar.

==== 1997–2010 ====
- The District of Epping Forest wards of Broadway, Buckhurst Hill East, Buckhurst Hill West, Chigwell Row, Chigwell Village, Debden Green, Epping Hemnall, Epping Lindsey, Grange Hill, High Beach, Loughton Forest, Loughton Roding, Loughton St John's, Loughton St Mary's, North Weald Bassett, Paternoster, Theydon Bois, Waltham Abbey East, and Waltham Abbey West.

North Weald Bassett transferred from Harlow.

==== 2010–2024 ====
- The District of Epping Forest wards of Broadley Common, Epping Upland and Nazeing, Buckhurst Hill East, Buckhurst Hill West, Chigwell Row, Chigwell Village, Epping Hemnall, Epping Lindsey and Thornwood Common, Grange Hill, Loughton Alderton, Loughton Broadway, Loughton Fairmead, Loughton Forest, Loughton Roding, Loughton St John's, Loughton St Mary's, Theydon Bois, Waltham Abbey High Beach, Waltham Abbey Honey Lane, Waltham Abbey North East, Waltham Abbey Paternoster, and Waltham Abbey South West.

The North Weald Bassett ward was transferred out again, to Brentwood and Ongar. Other marginal changes due to redistribution of local authority wards.

=== Current ===
The 2023 review of Westminster constituencies, which was based on the ward structure in place on 1 December 2020, left the boundaries unchanged. However, following a local government boundary review which came into effect in May 2024, the constituency now comprises the following from the 2024 general election:

- The District of Epping Forest wards or part wards of: Buckhurst Hill East & Whitebridge; Buckhurst Hill West, Chigwell with Lambourne (except Lambourne parish); Epping East; Epping West & Rural; Grange Hill; Loughton Fairmead; Loughton Forest; Loughton Roding; Loughton St John's; Theydon Bois with Passingford (Theydon Bois parish); Waltham Abbey North; Waltham Abbey South & Rural; Waltham Abbey West; and small parts of North Weald Bassett and Roydon & Lower Nazeing.

The constituency comprises the communities of Loughton, Epping, Waltham Abbey, Chigwell, Buckhurst Hill, Theydon Bois, part of North Weald, small intermediate villages and almost the whole of the ancient Forest itself, except those parts which were transferred to Greater London in 1965.

== Members of Parliament ==
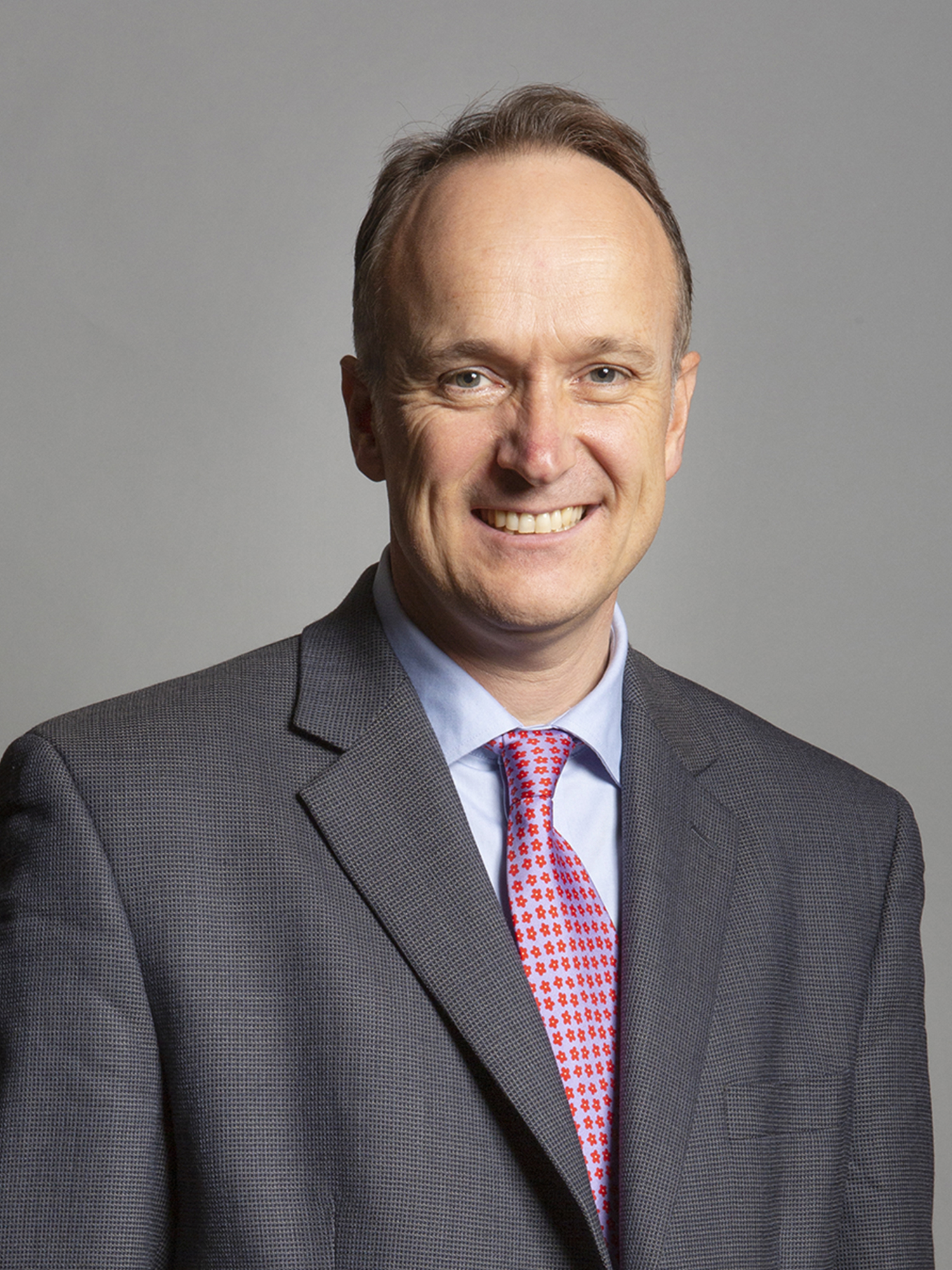
Neil Hudson, who has represented the constituency since 2024

The constituency was created in 1974 from the seats of Epping and Chigwell — both of these (then one constituency, Epping) were represented by Winston Churchill throughout his tenure as prime minister during World War II. The Conservative Party has won in Epping Forest in every election since the creation of the constituency. The previous MP Eleanor Laing, was Deputy Speaker of the House from October 2013 and Chairman of Ways and Means from 2020 until 2024.

Election	Member	Party
Feb 1974	John Biggs-Davison	Conservative
1988 by-election	Steve Norris	Conservative
1997	Eleanor Laing	Conservative
2024	Neil Hudson	Conservative

== Elections ==
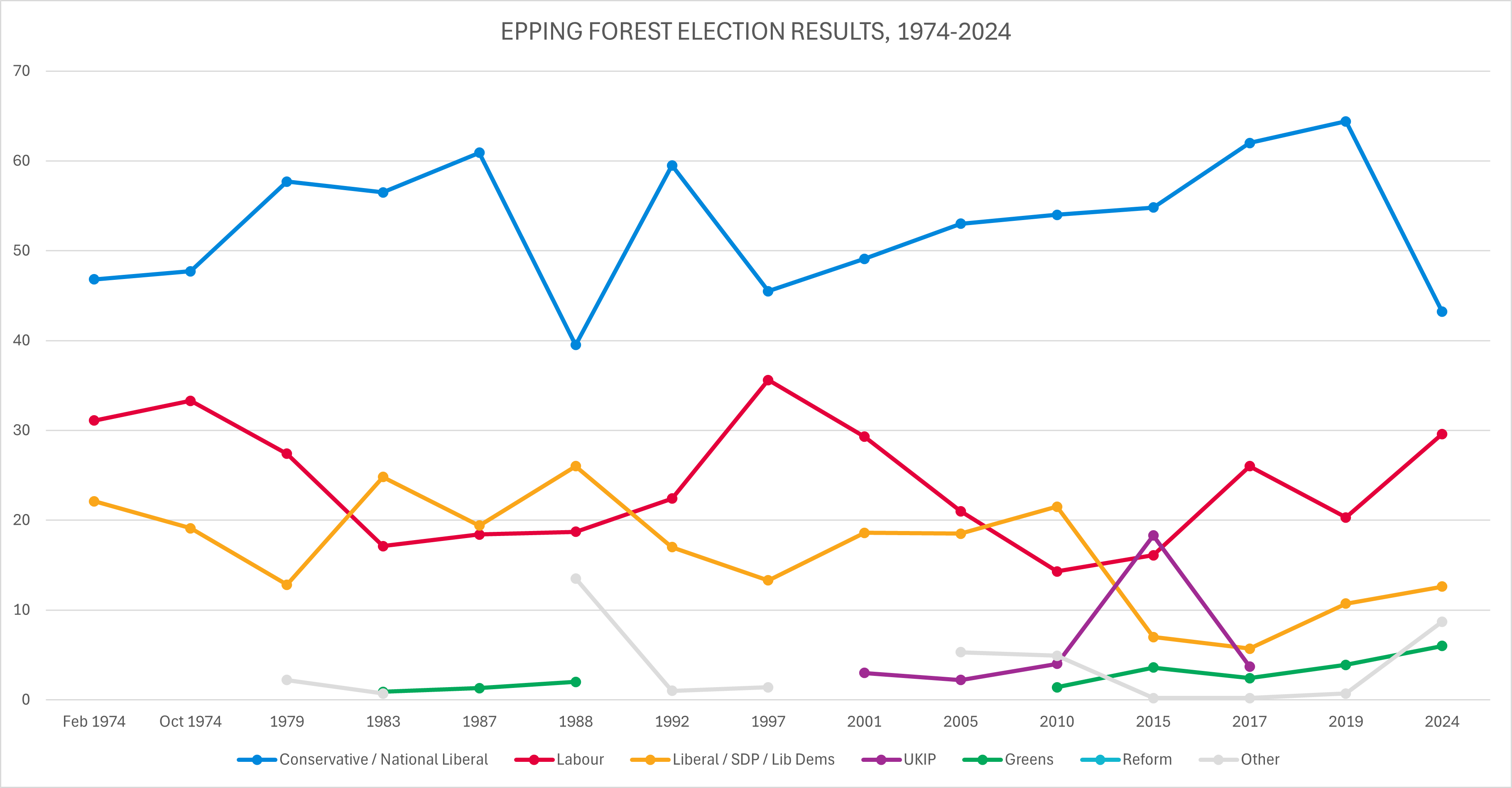
Epping Forest election results 1983–2024

=== Elections in the 2020s ===
General election 2024: Epping Forest
Party	Candidate	Votes	%	±%
Conservative	Neil Hudson	18,038	43.2	−21.2
Labour	Rosalind Doré	12,356	29.6	+9.3
Liberal Democrats	Jon Whitehouse	5,268	12.6	+1.9
Independent	Ed Pond	3,037	7.3	N/A
Green	Simon Heap	2,486	6.0	+2.1
Shared Ground	Thomas Hall	568	1.4	N/A
Majority		5,682	13.6	−30.5
Turnout		41,753	57.8	−9.9
Registered electors		72,229		
Conservative hold		Swing	−15.3	

=== Elections in the 2010s ===
General election 2019: Epping Forest
Party	Candidate	Votes	%	±%
Conservative	Eleanor Laing	32,364	64.4	+2.4
Labour	Vicky te Velde	10,191	20.3	−5.7
Liberal Democrats	Jon Whitehouse	5,387	10.7	+5.0
Green	Steven Neville	1,975	3.9	+1.5
Young People's Party UK	Thomas Hall	181	0.4	+0.2
SDP	Jon Newham	170	0.3	N/A
Majority		22,173	44.1	+8.1
Turnout		50,268	67.7	−0.2
Conservative hold		Swing	+4.1	

General election 2017: Epping Forest
Party	Candidate	Votes	%	±%
Conservative	Eleanor Laing	31,462	62.0	+7.2
Labour	Liam Preston	13,219	26.0	+9.9
Liberal Democrats	Jon Whitehouse	2,884	5.7	−1.3
UKIP	Patrick O'Flynn	1,871	3.7	−14.6
Green	Simon Heap	1,233	2.4	−1.2
Young People's Party UK	Thomas Hall	110	0.2	0.0
Majority		18,243	36.0	−0.5
Turnout		50,779	67.9	+0.8
Conservative hold		Swing	−0.9	

General election 2015: Epping Forest
Party	Candidate	Votes	%	±%
Conservative	Eleanor Laing	27,027	54.8	+0.8
UKIP	Andrew Smith	9,049	18.3	+14.3
Labour	Gareth Barrett	7,962	16.1	+1.8
Liberal Democrats	Jon Whitehouse	3,448	7.0	−14.5
Green	Anna Widdup	1,782	3.6	+2.2
Young People's Party UK	Mark Wadsworth	80	0.2	N/A
Majority		17,978	36.5	+4.0
Turnout		49,348	67.1	+2.6
Conservative hold		Swing		

General election 2010: Epping Forest
Party	Candidate	Votes	%	±%
Conservative	Eleanor Laing	25,148	54.0	+1.2
Liberal Democrats	Ann Haigh	10,017	21.5	+3.4
Labour	Katie Curtis	6,641	14.3	−7.2
BNP	Patricia Richardson	1,982	4.3	+0.2
UKIP	Andrew Smith	1,852	4.0	+1.7
Green	Simon Pepper	659	1.4	N/A
English Democrat	Kim Sawyer	285	0.6	−0.9
Majority		15,131	32.5	+1.2
Turnout		46,584	64.5	+2.8
Conservative hold		Swing		

=== Elections in the 2000s ===
General election 2005: Epping Forest
Party	Candidate	Votes	%	±%
Conservative	Eleanor Laing	23,783	53.0	+3.9
Labour	Bambos Charalambous	9,425	21.0	−8.3
Liberal Democrats	Michael Heavens	8,279	18.5	−0.1
BNP	Julian Leppert	1,728	3.9	N/A
UKIP	Andrew Smith	1,014	2.2	−0.8
English Democrat	Robin Tilbrook	631	1.4	N/A
Majority		14,358	32.0	+12.2
Turnout		44,860	61.6	+3.2
Conservative hold		Swing	+6.1	

General election 2001: Epping Forest
Party	Candidate	Votes	%	±%
Conservative	Eleanor Laing	20,833	49.1	+3.6
Labour	Christopher Naylor	12,407	29.3	−6.3
Liberal Democrats	Michael Heavens	7,884	18.6	+5.3
UKIP	Andrew Smith	1,290	3.0	N/A
Majority		8,426	19.8	+9.9
Turnout		42,414	58.4	−14.5
Conservative hold		Swing	+5.0	

=== Elections in the 1990s ===
General election 1997: Epping Forest
Party	Candidate	Votes	%	±%
Conservative	Eleanor Laing	24,117	45.5	−14.0
Labour	Stephen Murray	18,865	35.6	+12.6
Liberal Democrats	Stephen Robinson	7,074	13.3	−3.7
BNP	Paul Henderson	743	1.4	N/A
Majority		5,252	9.9	−26.2
Turnout		53,750	72.9	−7.6
Conservative hold		Swing	−13.3	

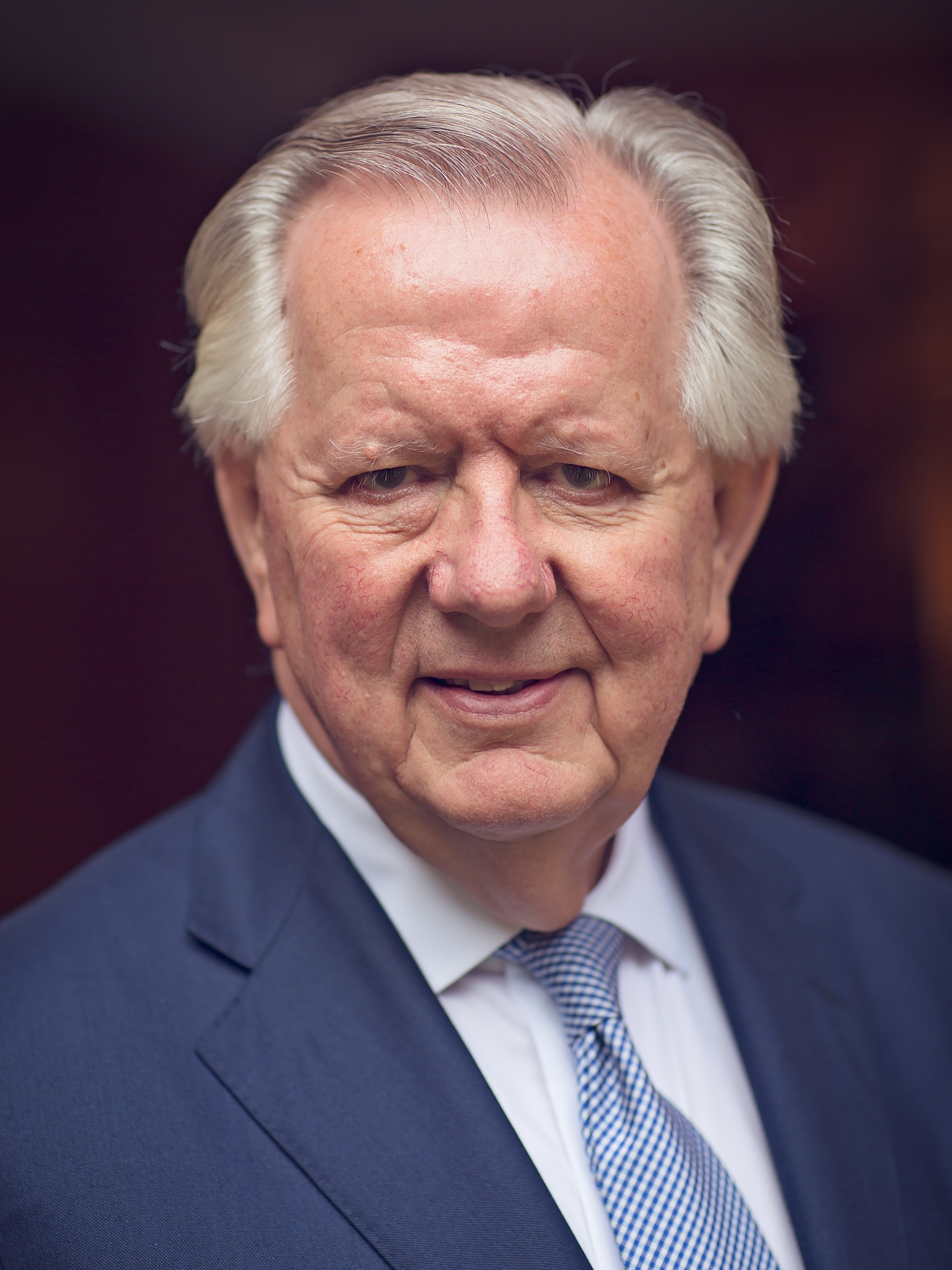
Steven Norris, who represented the constituency from 1988 until 1997

General election 1992: Epping Forest
Party	Candidate	Votes	%	±%
Conservative	Steven Norris	32,407	59.5	−1.4
Labour	Stephen Murray	12,219	22.4	+4.0
Liberal Democrats	Beryl Austen	9,265	17.0	−2.4
Epping Forest Residents Association	Andrew O'Brien	552	1.0	N/A
Majority		20,188	37.1	−4.4
Turnout		54,443	80.5	+4.2
Conservative hold		Swing	−2.7	

=== Elections in the 1980s ===
1988 Epping Forest by-election
Party	Candidate	Votes	%	±%
Conservative	Steven Norris	13,183	39.5	−21.6
SLD	Andrew Thompson	8,679	26.0	+6.6
Labour	Stephen Murray	6,261	18.7	+0.3
SDP	Michael Pettman	4,077	12.2	N/A
Green	Andrew Simms	672	2.0	+0.7
National Front	Tina Wingfield	286	0.6	N/A
Monster Raving Loony	Screaming Lord Sutch	208	0.6	N/A
Rainbow Alliance – Change the World	Jackie Moore	33	0.1	N/A
Vote no Belsen for South Africans	Brian Goodier	16	0.0	N/A
Majority		4,504	13.5	−28.0
Turnout		33,415	49.1	−27.2
Conservative hold		Swing		

General election 1987: Epping Forest
Party	Candidate	Votes	%	±%
Conservative	John Biggs-Davison	31,536	60.9	+4.4
SDP	Anthony Humphris	10,023	19.4	−5.4
Labour	Stephen Murray	9,499	18.4	+1.3
Green	Richard Denhard	695	1.3	+0.4
Majority		21,513	41.5	+9.8
Turnout		51,753	76.3	+4.3
Conservative hold		Swing	+4.9	

General election 1983: Epping Forest
Party	Candidate	Votes	%	±%
Conservative	John Biggs-Davison	27,373	56.5	−1.2
SDP	Michael Pettman	11,995	24.8	+12.0
Labour	Hilary Bryan	8,289	17.1	−10.3
Ecology	Robert Boenke	452	0.9	N/A
BNP	Sydney Smith	330	0.7	N/A
Majority		15,378	31.7	
Turnout		48,439	72.0	
Conservative hold		Swing	−6.6	

=== Elections in the 1970s ===
General election 1979: Epping Forest
Party	Candidate	Votes	%	±%
Conservative	John Biggs-Davison	29,447	57.7	+10.0
Labour	William David Shepherd	13,994	27.4	−5.9
Liberal	David Monro Kitching	6,528	12.8	−6.3
National Front	Brian Clive Wilkins	1,110	2.2	N/A
Majority		15,453	30.3	+15.9
Turnout		51,079	76.6	+3.3
Conservative hold		Swing	+8.0	

General election October 1974: Epping Forest
Party	Candidate	Votes	%	±%
Conservative	John Biggs-Davison	22,392	47.7	+0.9
Labour	Stanley James Palfreman	15,618	33.3	+2.2
Liberal	Derek Frederick John Wood	8,952	19.1	−3.0
Majority		6,774	14.4	−1.3
Turnout		46,962	73.3	−8.5
Conservative hold		Swing	−0.7	

General election February 1974: Epping Forest
Party	Candidate	Votes	%	±%
Conservative	John Biggs-Davison	24,290	46.8	−7.5
Labour	William James Sheaff	16,123	31.1	−14.6
Liberal	Derek Frederick John Wood	11,478	22.1	N/A
Majority		8,167	15.7	−7.1
Turnout		51,891	81.8	+8.7
Conservative hold		Swing	+3.6	

=== Notional results (before 1974) ===
Notional General Election 1970: Epping Forest
Party	Candidate	Votes	%	±%
Conservative	John Biggs-Davison	35,010	54.3	+9.2
Labour		29,506	45.7	+4.3
Majority		5,504	8.6	+5.9
Turnout		64,516	73.1	−9.4
Conservative hold		Swing	+2.5	

Notional General Election 1966: Epping Forest
Party	Candidate	Votes	%	±%
Conservative		21,834	44.1	
Labour		20,504	41.4	
Liberal		7,202	14.5	
Majority		1,330	2.7	
Turnout		49,540	82.5	
Conservative hold		Swing		

== Graphical representation ==
February 1974
31.1%	22.1%	46.8%
Labour	Liberal	Conservative

October 1974
33.3%	19.1%	47.7%
Labour	Liberal	Conservative

1979
27.4%	12.8%	57.7%
Labour	Liberal	Conservative

1983
17.1%	24.8%	56.5%
Labour	SDP	Conservative

1987
18.4%	19.4%	60.9%
Labour	Liberal	Conservative

1988 by-election
18.7%	12.2%	26.0%	39.5%
Labour	SDP	Social and Liberal Democrats	Conservative

1992
22.4%	17.0%	59.5%
Labour	Lib Dems	Conservative

1997
35.6%	13.3%	45.5%
Labour	Lib Dems	Conservative

2001
29.3%	18.6%	49.1%	3.0%
Labour	Lib Dems	Conservative	UKIP

2005
21.0%	18.5%	53.0%	3.9%
Labour	Lib Dems	Conservative	BNP

2010
14.3%	21.5%	54.0%	4.0%	4.3%
Lab	Lib Dems	Conservative	UKIP	BNP

2015
3.6%	16.1%	7.0%	54.8%	18.3%
Green	Labour	Lib Dems	Conservative	UKIP

2017
26.0%	5.7%	62.0%	3.7%
Labour	Lib Dems	Conservative	UKIP

2019
3.9%	20.3%	10.7%	64.4%
Green	Labour	Lib Dems	Conservative

2024
6.0%	29.6%	12.6%	43.2%	7.3%
Green	Labour	Lib Dems	Conservative	Ed Pond

== See also ==
- List of parliamentary constituencies in Essex

== Notes ==
Preceded by Epping (part)	UK Parliament constituency^{Epping, Theydon Bois, Waltham Abbey, Buckhurst Hill, Chigwell, Loughton} 1974 – present	Current boundaries
Preceded by Chigwell (part)	UK Parliament constituency^{Epping, Theydon Bois, Waltham Abbey, Buckhurst Hill, Chigwell, Loughton} 1974 – present	Current boundaries
