= El Bolsón =

El Bolsón may refer to:

- El Bolsón, Río Negro, a village in Argentina
- El Bolsón, Catamarca, a village in Argentina
- Cerro del Bolsón, a mountain in Argentina

== See also ==
- Bolsón de Mapimí, a river basin in Mexico
