= Methodist Central Hall, Westminster =

Methodist Central Hall
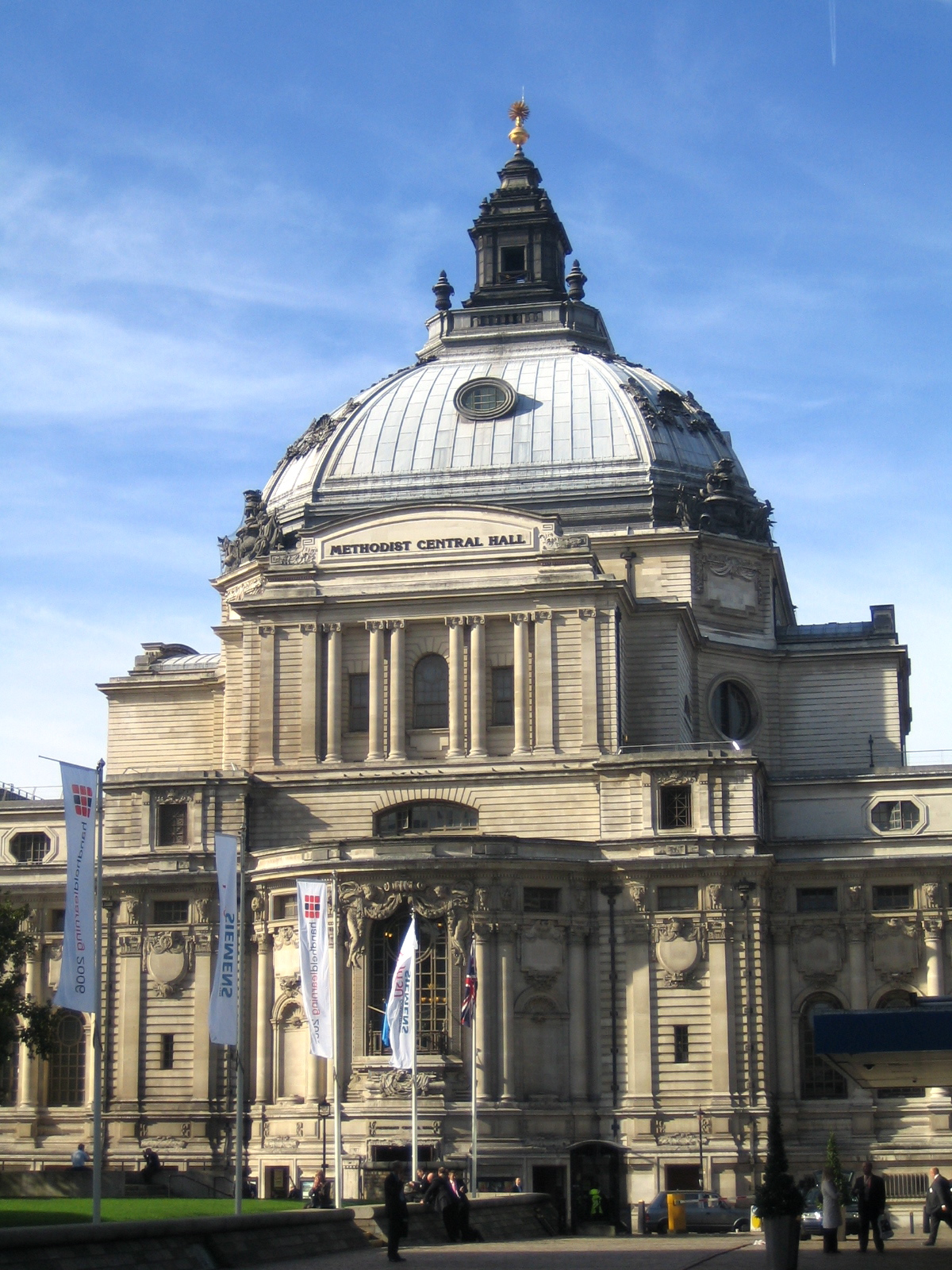
- Front entrance

- Location within Greater London
- 51°30′00″N 0°07′48″W
- OS grid reference: TQ 29889 79554
- Location: Westminster, London, SW1
- Country: England
- Denomination: Methodist Church of Great Britain

Architecture
- Style: Baroque; Edwardian
- Groundbreaking: 1905
- Completed: 1911
- Construction cost: £496,152

Specifications
- Capacity: 2,300 (Great Hall)

Administration
- District: London Deacon: Ali McMillan

The Methodist Central Hall (also known as Central Hall Westminster) is a multi-purpose venue in the City of Westminster, serving primarily as a Methodist church and a conference centre. The building also houses an art gallery, a restaurant, and office spaces (used formerly as the headquarters of the Methodist Church of Great Britain until 2000). It contains 22 conference, meeting and seminar rooms, the largest being the Great Hall, which seats 2,300. Central Hall also acts as an important spiritual and sacred place for Methodists.

Methodist Central Hall occupies the corner of Tothill Street and Storeys Gate just off Victoria Street in Westminster, near the junction with The Sanctuary next to the Queen Elizabeth II Conference Centre and facing Westminster Abbey.

== History ==
Methodist Central Hall was erected by Wesleyan Methodists as one of their mixed-purpose 'central halls'. Central Hall was to act not only as a church, but to be of "great service for conferences on religious, educational, scientific, philanthropic and social questions". The hall was built in 1905–1911 on the site of the Royal Aquarium, Music Hall and Imperial Theatre, an entertainment complex that operated with varying success from 1876 to 1903. Construction was funded between 1898 and 1908 by the "Wesleyan Methodist Twentieth Century Fund" (or the "Million Guinea Fund", as it became more commonly known), whose aim was to raise one million guineas from one million Methodists. The fund closed in 1904 having raised 1,024,501 guineas (£1,075,727). The project to establish the Million Guinea Fund, and build the Central Hall was the brainchild of Sir Robert William Perks (1849-1934).

The building played host to several important events; meetings of the suffragette movement took place at Methodist Central Hall in 1914. Scenes were re-enacted in the 2015 film Suffragette, some of which was shot in the hall.

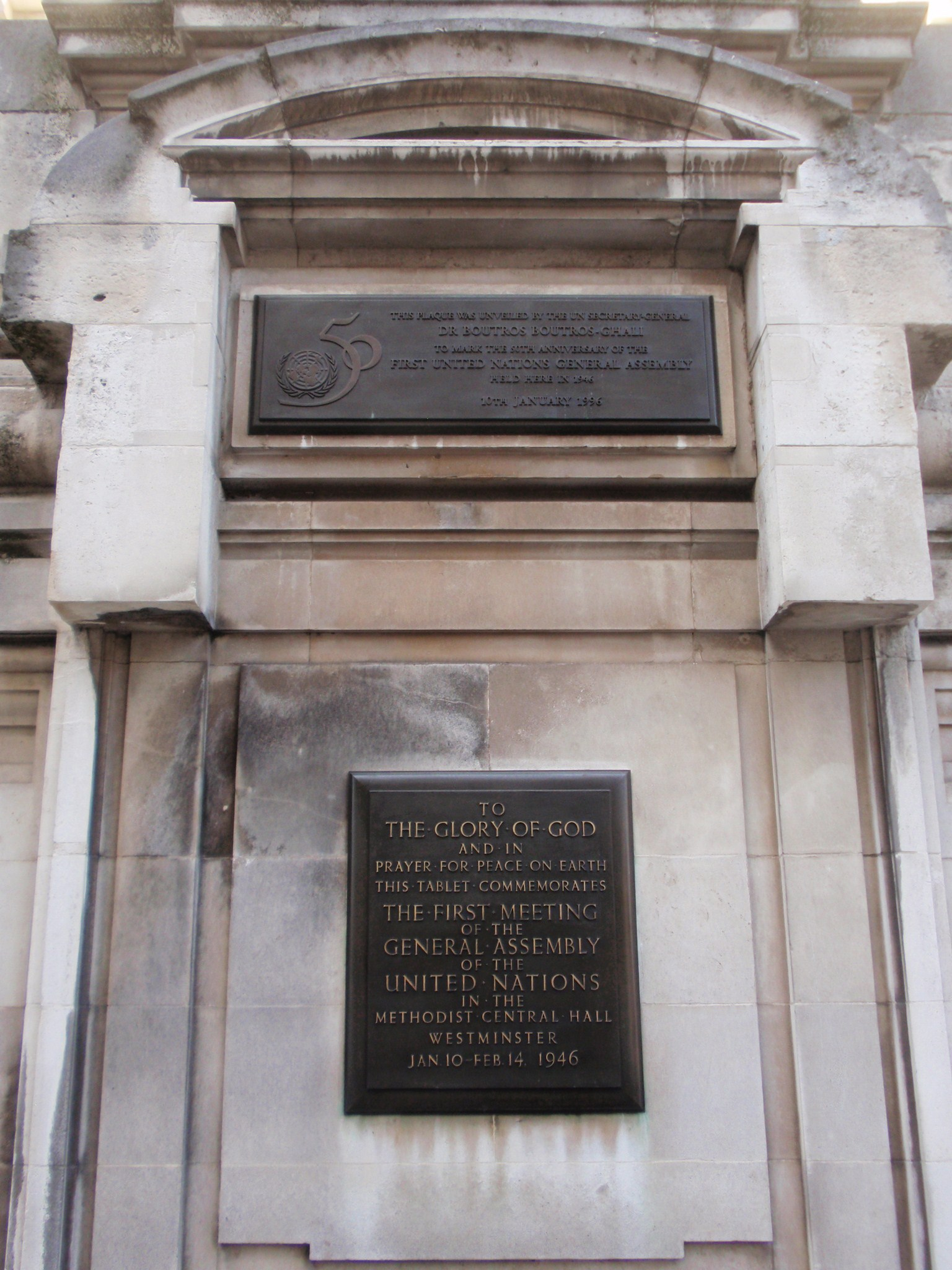
The 50th anniversary plaque of the first meeting of the United Nations General Assembly in Central Hall

Methodist Central Hall hosted the first session of the United Nations General Assembly in 1946. In return for the use of the hall, the assembly voted to fund the repainting of the walls of the church in a light blue. While it was being used by the UN General Assembly, the congregation relocated to the Coliseum Theatre.

It has been regularly used for political rallies—famous speakers have included Winnie Mandela, Mahatma Gandhi and Mikhail Gorbachev. In September 1972 the Conservative Monday Club held a much publicised "Halt Immigration Now!" public meeting in the main hall, addressed by several prominent speakers including members of parliament Ronald Bell, John Biggs-Davison, Harold Soref, and John Stokes. The Monday Club continued its use of the building until 1991 when it held two seminars there.

In 1968, Central Hall hosted the first public performance of Andrew Lloyd Webber's Joseph and the Amazing Technicolor Dreamcoat in a concert that also included his father (organist William Lloyd Webber who was musical director at Central Hall), his brother the cellist Julian Lloyd Webber and pianist John Lill.

In early 1966 the FIFA World Cup Jules Rimet Trophy was on display at Central Hall in preparation for the football tournament being held in England that summer. It was stolen from the hall on 20 March 1966 and was recovered seven days later in south London, but the thief was never caught. England won the trophy four months later. The Jules Rimet Trophy was stolen again in Brazil and never recovered, and so had to be replaced.

In 2017, Central Hall was host to the first FIFA Interactive (a football-based computer game) World Cup Final, in which Spencer Ealing (known as Gorilla) beat Kai Wollin (known as DETO).

In 2005, Central Hall controversially applied for a licence to sell alcohol in its café and conference venues. As the Methodist Church has traditionally promoted abstinence and usually forbids consumption of alcohol on church premises, many Methodists argued that the application was in defiance of church rules and a written objection was compiled.

It is frequently used for public enquiries, including those into the Ladbroke Grove rail crash, the sinking of the Marchioness pleasure boat, and the Bloody Sunday incident in Northern Ireland.

== Architecture ==
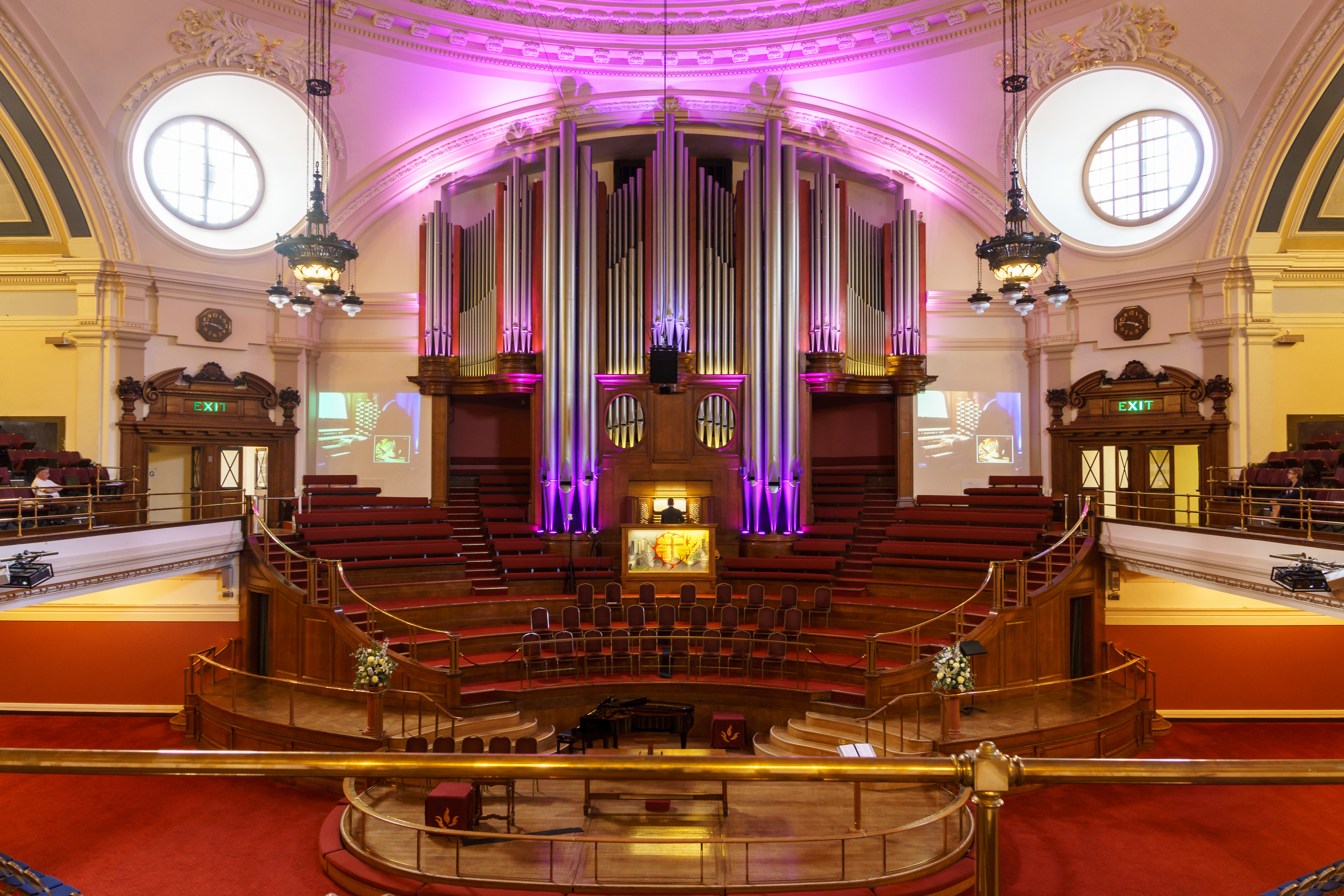
The grand organ contains 3,789 pipes and is located in the Great Hall.

The Methodist Central Hall is a Grade II* listed building. It was designed by Edwin Alfred Rickards, of the firm Lanchester, Stewart and Rickards. This company also designed the City Hall building in Cathays Park, Cardiff, with which it shares many similarities. Although clad in an elaborate baroque style, to contrast with Westminster Abbey, it is an early example of the use of a reinforced concrete frame for a building in Britain. The interior was similarly planned on a Piranesian scale, although the execution was rather more economical.

The original 1904 design included two small towers on the main (east) façade, facing Westminster Abbey. These were never built, supposedly because of an outcry that they would reduce the dominance of Nicholas Hawksmoor's west towers at Westminster Abbey in views from St James's Park. The hall was eventually finished in 1911.

The domed ceiling of the Great Hall is reputed to be the second largest of its type in the world. The vast scale of the self-supporting ferro-concrete structure reflects the original intention that Central Hall was intended to be a meeting place for "open-air preaching with the roof on".

The angels in the exterior spandrels were designed by Henry Poole.

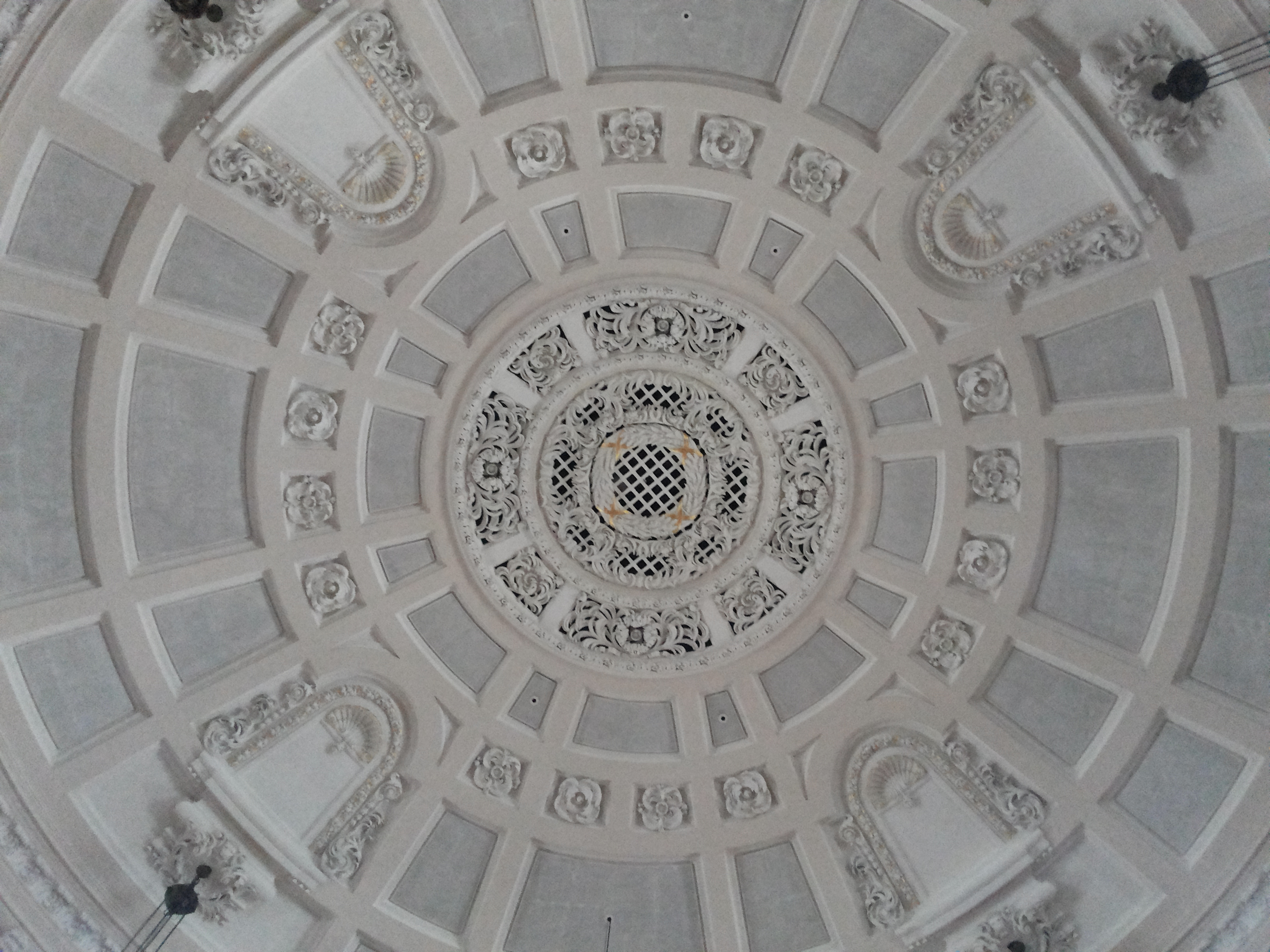
Interior of the Great Hall, looking up into the dome

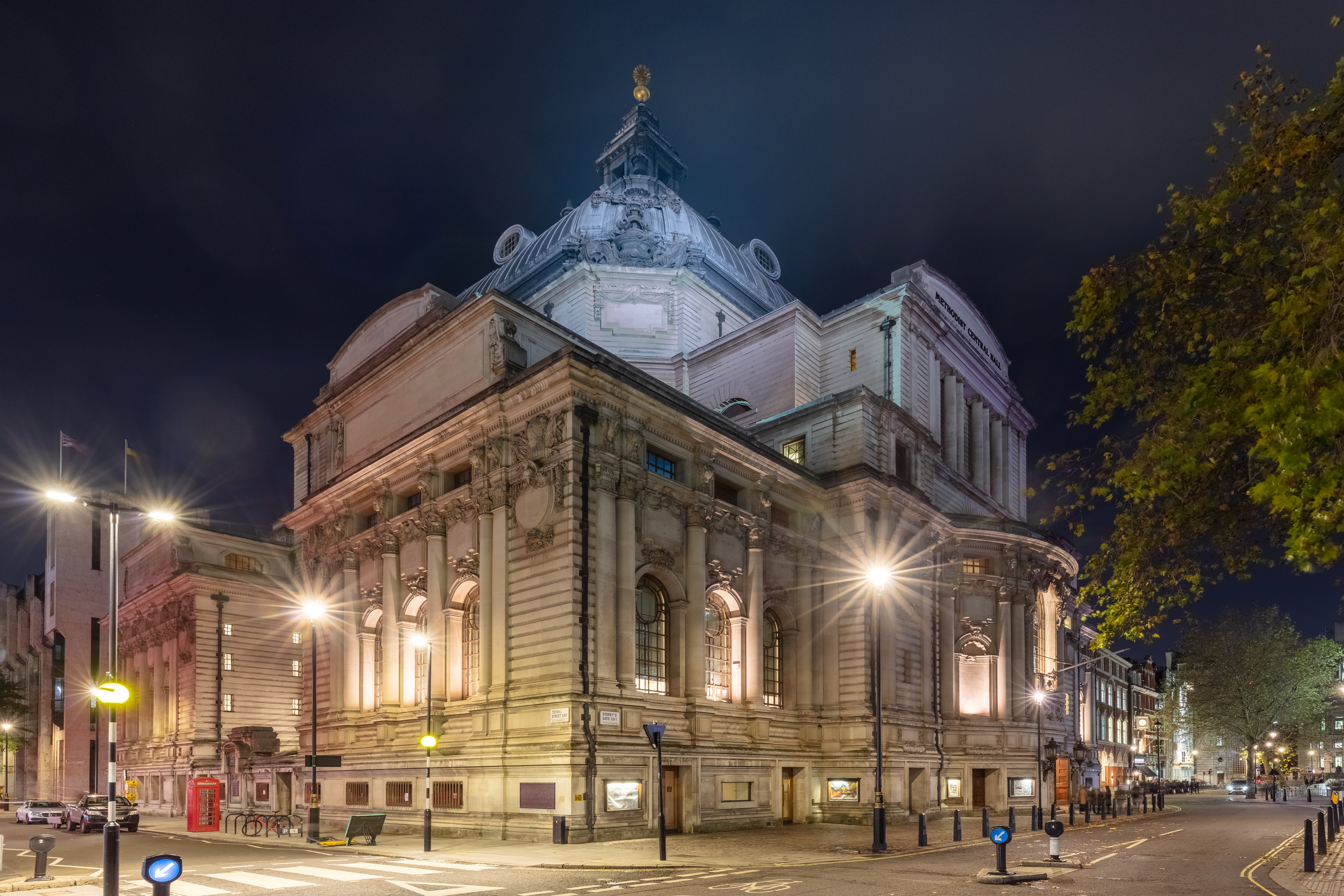
Central Hall at night time

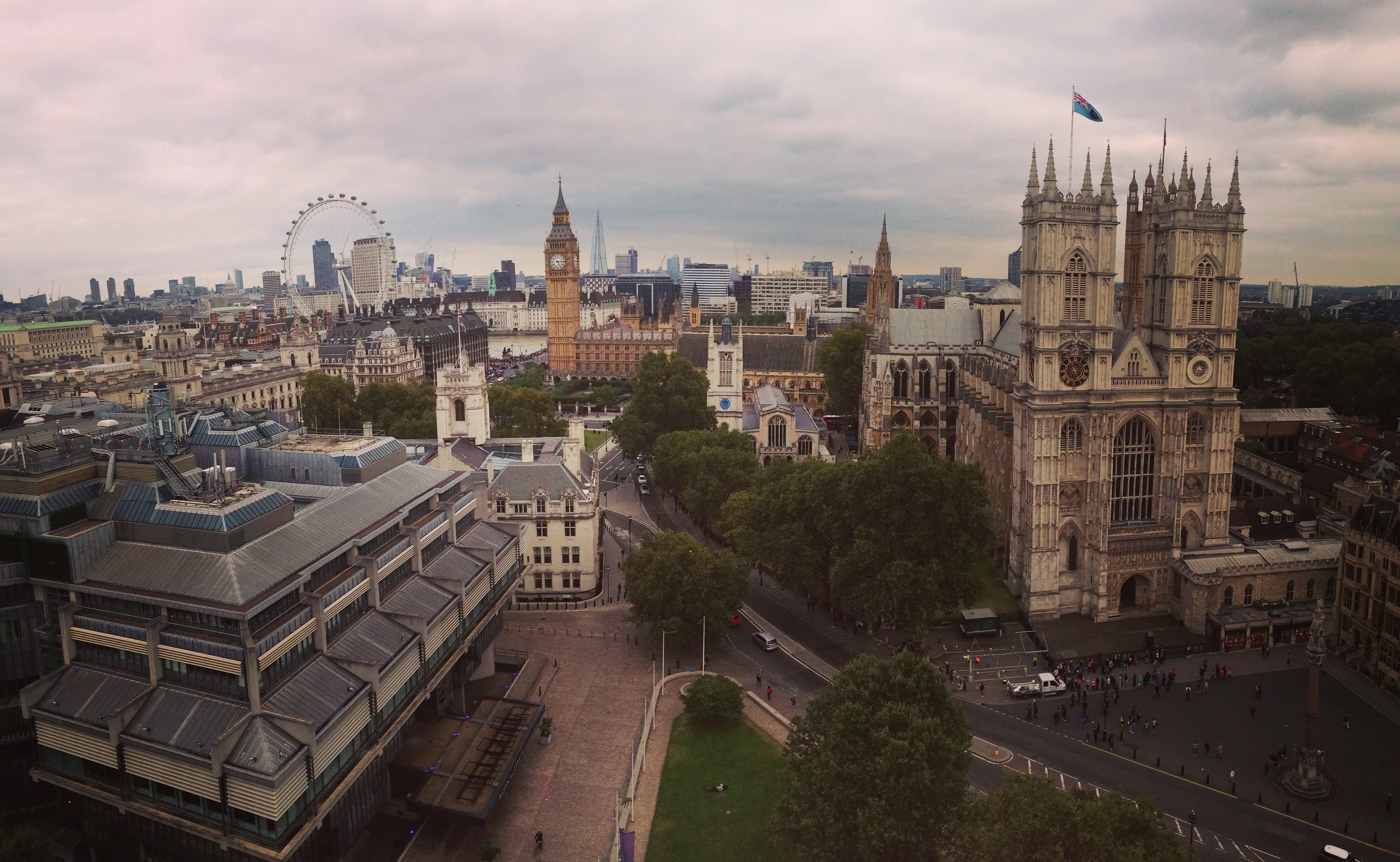
A view of London from the roof of Central Hall, looking to the east

=== Organ ===
The organ was built in 1912 by William Hill & Sons and rebuilt and revised in 1970 by Rushworth and Dreaper. In 2011, Harrison & Harrison revised the layout, provided new slider soundboards and actions and painted the front pipes. The organ has 57 stops/68 ranks and 3,789 speaking pipes on four manuals and pedal. The stoplist since 2011:

I Choir C–c^{4}
Open Diapason	8′
Stopped Diapason	8′
Salicional	8′
Principal	4′
Open Flute	4′
Nazard	2^{2}/_{3}′
Fifteenth	2′
Flageolet	2′
Tierce	1^{3}/_{5}′
Larigot	1^{1}/_{3}′
Mixture III
Trumpet	8′
Tremulant

II Great C–c^{4}
Double Open Diapason	16′
Open Diapason No I	8′
Open Diapason No II	8′
Open Diapason No III	8′
Clarabella	8′
Octave	4′
Principal	4′
Hohl Flute	4′
Twelfth	2^{2}/_{3}′
Fifteenth	2′
Mixture IV
Contra Trombone	16′
Trumpet	8′
Octave Trumpet	4′

III Swell C–c^{4}
Cone Gamba	16′
Open Diapason	8′
Lieblich Gedeckt	8′
Gamba	8′
Voix Céleste	8′
Principal	4′
Lieblich Flute	4′
Flageolet	2′
Mixture III
Oboe	8′
Vox Humana	8′
Tremulant
Contra Fagotto	16′
Cornopean	8′
Clarion	4′

IV Solo C–c^{4}
Harmonic Flute	8′
Concert Flute	4′
Piccolo	2′
Viol d'Orchestre	8′
Voix Célestes	8′
Clarinet	8′
Orchestral Oboe	8′
Tremulant
French Horn	8′
Orchestral Trumpet	8′
Tuba	8′

Pedal C–g^{1}
Contra Violone	32′
Major Bass	16′
Open Diapason	16′ (Tr. Great)
Violone	16′ (Ext. 32')
Contra Gamba	16′ (Tr. Swell)
Bourdon	16′
Principal	8′
Flute	8′ (Ext. Bourdon 16')
Fifteenth	4′
Stopped Flute	4′ (Ext. Bourdon 16')
Mixture IV
Contra Posaune	32′ (Ext. Contra Trombone 16' Great)
Posaune	16′ (Tr. Great)
Trombone	16′
Contra Fagotto	16′ (Tr. Swell)
Trumpet	8′ (Ext. Trombone 16')

- Couplers: III-I, IV-I, I-II, III-II, IV-II, IV-III, Sub and Super III, Sub and Super III, Unison off III, Unison off IV, I-P, II-P, III-P, IV-P.
- 8 General Combinations, 8 Divisional Combinations for each Manual and the Pedal (on 256 Memory Levels); Continental Stepper (General Piston Sequencer + and -).
