= Monday Club =

Political pressure group in the UK

Conservative Monday Club
- Header of the Monday Club from the 1970s
- Formation: 1 January 1961; 65 years ago
- Founders: Paul Bristol; Ian Grieg; Cedric Gunnery; Anthony Maclaren
- Dissolved: 1 July 2024; 2 years ago
- Purpose: British conservatism High Toryism; Anti-communism; Anti-immigration
- Headquarters: Southmill Trading Centre; Bishop's Stortford; CM23 3DY
- Location: United Kingdom

The Conservative Monday Club (usually known as the Monday Club) was a British political pressure group, aligned with the Conservative Party, though not endorsed by it after 2001. It also had links to the Democratic Unionist Party (DUP) and Ulster Unionist Party (UUP) in Northern Ireland.

Founded in 1961, in reaction to Prime Minister Harold Macmillan's opposition to white minority rule in Southern Rhodesia, the club became embroiled in the decolonisation and immigration debate, inevitably highlighting the controversial issue of race, which has dominated its image ever since. The club was known for its fierce opposition to non-white immigration to Britain and its support for apartheid-era South Africa and Southern Rhodesia. By 1971, the club had 35 MPs, six of them ministers, and 35 peers, with membership (including branches) totaling about 10,000.

In 1982, the constitution was re-written, with more emphasis on support for the Conservative Party, but it remained autonomous from the party. In-fighting over the club's traditional Tory agenda led to many resignations in 1991. In 2001, the Conservative Party formally severed relations with the club, which had ceased to exercise significant influence, with full membership below 600.

Following a vote of the Executive Council, the organisation was formally disbanded in July 2024.

== History ==
=== Foundation and early years ===
The club was founded on 1 January 1961, by four young Conservative Party members, Paul Bristol (a 24-year-old shipbroker and the club's first chairman, who left the club in 1968), Ian Greig (Membership Secretary until 1969), Cedric Gunnery (Treasurer until 1992; died 16 Mar 2023), and Anthony Maclaren. The club was formed "to force local party associations to discuss and debate party policy". Its first general policy statement deplored the tendency of recent Conservative governments to adopt policies based upon expediency and demanded that instead Tory principles should be the guiding influence. It believed that the principles needing to be reasserted included the preservation of the constitution and existing institutions, the freedom of the individual, the private ownership of property, and the need for Britain to play a leading part in world affairs.

The club disliked what it regarded as the expediency, cynicism and materialism which motivated Harold Macmillan's government. In addition it was concerned that during this period "the left wing of the Party (had) gained a predominant influence over policy" and that as a result the Conservative Party had shifted to the left, so that "the floating voter could not detect, as he should, major differences between it and the Socialists" and, furthermore, "loyal Conservatives had become disillusioned and dispirited". The club's published aims stated that it "seeks to evolve a dynamic application of traditional Tory principles".

The group brought together supporters of Rhodesia and South Africa; the main impetus for the group's formation was the Conservatives' new decolonisation policies, in particular as a general reaction to Macmillan's 'Wind of Change' speech made in South Africa. The club stated that Macmillan had "turned the Party Left", and its first pamphlet opposed these policies as indicative of the Conservative Party's move towards liberalism. The club is notable for having promoted a policy of voluntary, or assisted, repatriation for Commonwealth immigrants, a policy subsequently adopted in the 1970 Conservative Party manifesto.

The 5th Marquess of Salisbury (1893–1972), who had resigned from Macmillan's Cabinet over the Prime Minister's liberal direction, became its first president in January 1962, when he stated "there was never a greater need for true conservatism than there is today". By the end of 1963 there were eleven Members of Parliament in the Club, which then had an overall membership of about 300. The club was courted by many Conservative politicians, including the Conservative Party leader Alec Douglas-Home who was guest-of-honour at the club's annual dinners of 1964 and 1969, and Enoch Powell, who, in a speech in 1968, said that "it was due to the Monday Club that many are brought within the Conservative Party who might otherwise be estranged from it".

That year Alan Clark joined the club and was soon chairman of its Wiltshire branch. Under its chairman from 1964 to 1969, Paul Williams, who until 1964 had been MP for Sunderland South, the club enjoyed significant growth and influence. Some argued that the club had a disproportionate influence within Conservative circles, especially after six of its members who were MPs joined the Cabinet in 1970.

Harold Wilson, twice Labour Prime Minister, described the club as "the guardian of the Tory conscience". Oxford political scholar Roger Griffin referred to the club as practicing an anti-socialist and elitist form of conservatism.

=== Membership ===
By 1970, eighteen Members of Parliament were club members:

- Geoffrey Rippon (Hexham)
- Julian Amery (Brighton Pavilion)
- Ronald Bell QC (South Buckinghamshire)
- Harold Gurden (Selly Oak)
- Teddy Taylor (Glasgow Cathcart)
- John Peyton (Yeovil)
- Paul Williams (Sunderland South)
- Duncan Sandys (Streatham)
- Joseph Hiley (Pudsey)
- John Biggs-Davison (Chigwell)
- Stephen Hastings (Mid Bedfordshire)
- Victor Goodhew (St Albans)
- Wilfred Baker (Banffshire)
- Jasper More (Ludlow)
- Jill Knight (Edgbaston)
- Patrick Wall (Haltemprice)
- Mark Woodnutt (Isle of Wight)
- Sir Jerry Wiggin (Weston-super-Mare)

In the 1970 Conservative Party election victory, six MPs who were club members were given Cabinet positions. In addition, the following club members were elected that year:

- Geoffrey Stewart-Smith (Belper)
- Patrick Cormack (Cannock)
- Anthony Fell (Great Yarmouth)
- Robert Boscawen (Wells)
- Harold Soref (Ormskirk)
- William Benyon (Buckingham)
- Roger White (Gravesend)
- Peter Rost (South East Derbyshire)
- Norman Tebbit (Epping)
- Piers Dixon (Truro)
- David James (North Dorset)
- John Heydon Stokes (Oldbury and Halesowen)

Among sitting MPs who joined the club after that and other elections, along with those who became MPs were:

- Alan Clark (Plymouth Sutton and Kensington & Chelsea)
- Harvey Proctor (Basildon)
- Sir Stephen McAdden (Southend East)
- Richard Body (Holland with Boston)
- Sir Ronald Russell (Wembley South)
- George Gardiner (Reigate)
- William Craig (Belfast East)
- Gerald Howarth (Aldershot)
- Evelyn King (South Dorset)
- John Carlisle (Luton North)
- Rhodes Boyson (Brent North)
- The Hon. Archibald Hamilton (Epsom and Ewell)
- Tim Janman (Thurrock)
- Peter Bottomley (Worthing West)
- Colin Campbell Mitchell (West Aberdeenshire)
- Bernard Braine (Castle Point)
- James Molyneaux (Lagan Valley)
- John Taylor (Strangford)
- Neil Hamilton (Tatton)
- Robert Taylor (Croydon North West)
- Nicholas Winterton (Macclesfield)
- Ann Winterton (Congleton)

Peers of the House of Lords who were Monday Club members:

- Iain Murray, 10th Duke of Atholl
- Robert Gascoyne-Cecil, 5th Marquess of Salisbury
- Robert Gascoyne-Cecil, 6th Marquess of Salisbury
- Dermot Chichester, 7th Marquess of Donegall
- Patrick Maitland, 17th Earl of Lauderdale
- Victor Montagu, 10th Earl of Sandwich
- Charles Carnegie, 11th Earl of Southesk
- John Wodehouse, 4th Earl of Kimberley
- George Jellicoe, 2nd Earl Jellicoe
- John Whyte-Melville-Skeffington, 13th Viscount Massereene
- John Skeffington, 14th Viscount Massereene
- Alan Lennox-Boyd, 1st Viscount Boyd of Merton
- Merlin Hanbury-Tracy, 7th Baron Sudeley
- Jonathan Guinness, 3rd Baron Moyne
- Vernon Willey, 2nd Baron Barnby
- Wavell Wakefield, 1st Baron Wakefield of Kendal

Other notable members:

- General Sir Walter Walker
- Sir Adrian FitzGerald, 24th Knight of Kerry
- Sir Horace Cutler – Leader of Greater London Council from 1977 to 1981
- Sir James Goldsmith
- Sir Victor Raikes, former Conservative MP for Liverpool Garston (1931–1957)
- Commander Anthony Courtney, former Conservative MP for Harrow East (1959–1966)

A number of other Monday Club members contested Labour-held seats, some of which had large majorities, and although the challenge was unsuccessful, their majorities were reduced. These included: Tim Keigwin, who almost unseated the Liberal leader Jeremy Thorpe at North Devon, Councillor John Pritchard of Bromley London Borough Council, who contested Wrexham and Norwood, and David Clarke, whose personal campaign assistant was the chairman of the club's Young Members' Group, Christopher Horne, and who failed by only 76 votes at Watford.

By 1971, the club "undoubtedly had the largest membership of any conservative group and included 55 different groups in universities and colleges, 35 Members of Parliament with six in the government, and 35 Peers". At the club's Annual General Meeting on 26 April 1971, in Westminster Central Hall, the chairman, George Pole, announced that "our membership, including national, branches and universities is around 10,000."

MP John Biggs-Davison, in his foreword to Robert Copping's second book on the history of the club, stated that "by its principles [the club] has kept alive true Tory beliefs and held within its ranks many who contemplated defecting from the Conservative and Unionist Party". The club's chairman in June 1981, David Storey, described it as "an anchor to a ship", referring to the Conservative Party.

=== The Thatcher years ===
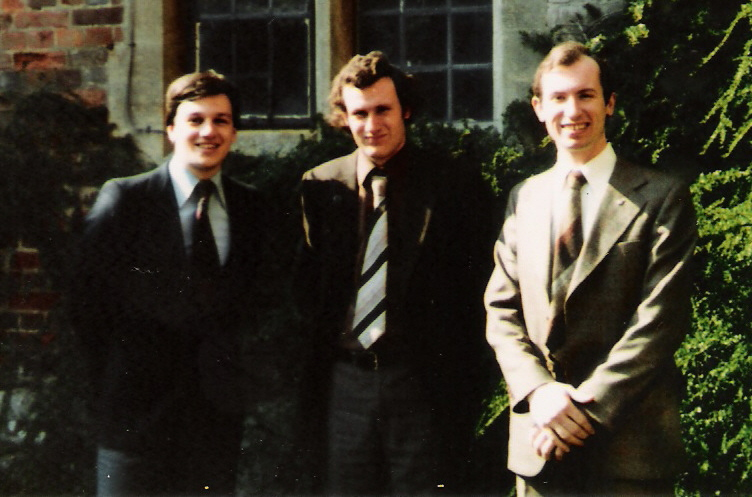
Three of the Young Members' Group at a Club Conference at Chilham Castle, 1980: John R. Pinniger (YMG Chairman), Richard Turnbull and Gregory Lauder-Frost.

The club's revised constitution (21 May 1984) stated that "the objects of the Club are to support the Conservative & Unionist Party in those policies designed:

- to maintain loyalty to the Crown and to uphold the sovereignty of Parliament, the security of the realm, and defence of the nation against external aggression and internal subversion;
- to safeguard the liberty of the subject and integrity of the family in accordance with the customs, traditions, and character of the British people;
- to maintain the British constitution in obedience and respect for the laws of the land, freedom of worship and our national heritage;
- to promote an economy consistent with national aspirations and Tory ideals;
- to encourage members of the club to play an active part, at all levels, in the affairs of the Conservative and Unionist Party."

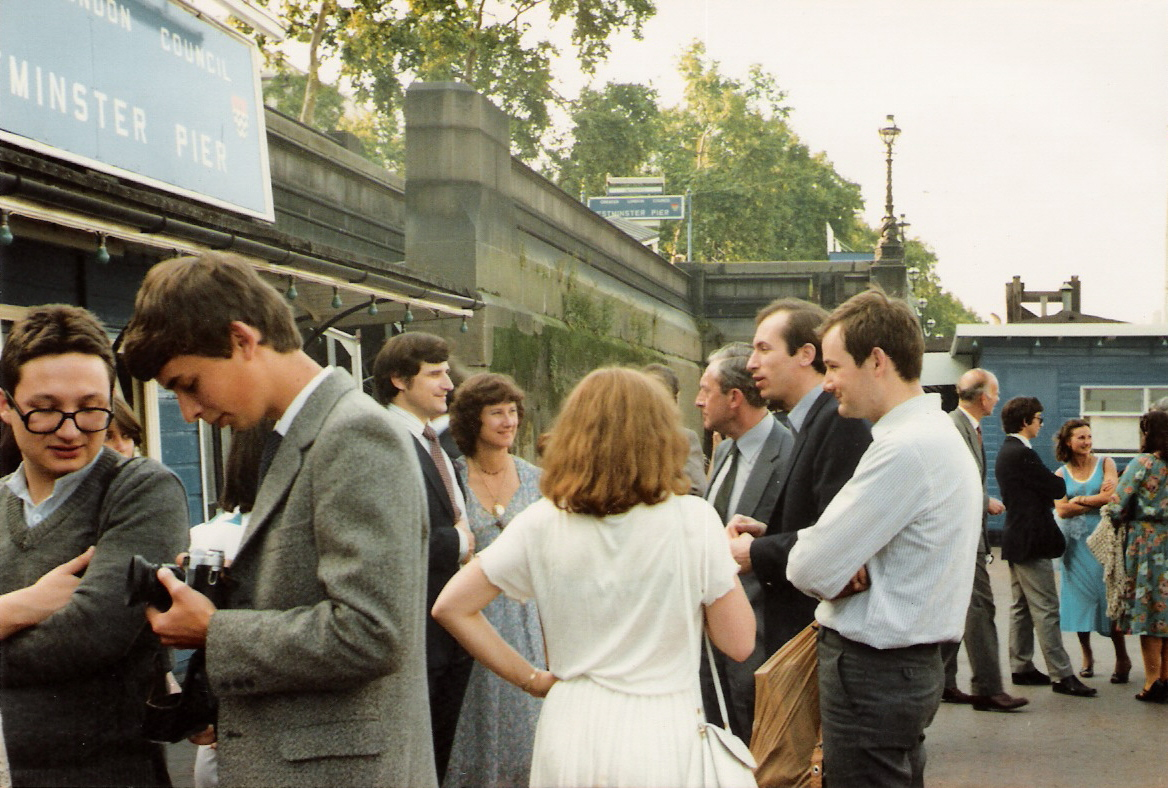
Members gather for the club's 20th anniversary riverboat party organised by the Young Members' Group, 15 July 1981.

During the period that Margaret Thatcher led the Conservative Party, the Monday Club were prolific publishers of booklets, pamphlets, policy papers, an occasional newspaper, Right Ahead, and a magazine Monday World edited for some years by Sir Adrian FitzGerald, Bart., Sam Swerling, and later, Eleanor Dodd. In the October 1982 edition, MP Harvey Proctor called for the scrapping of the Commission for Racial Equality, Sir Patrick Wall commented on the Falklands War, James Molyneaux had an article "What Future for Ulster", and Dr. Harvey Ward had an article on "Zimbabwe Today". The September 1984 edition of Monday News carried the headline "Kinnock Talks to Terrorists", quoting Labour Party leader Neil Kinnock's declaration to the African National Congress's Oliver Tambo that the ANC in South Africa could expect financial and material assistance from a future Labour government. Other attacks were made upon then-Greater London Council leader Ken Livingstone inviting Sinn Féin leader Gerry Adams to visit London in 1982.

An early member, in his Diaries, Alan Clark describes speaking later to a county-branch of the Monday Club in 1982: "I really cannot bear the Monday Club. They are all mad, quite different from its heyday, when it was a right-wing pressure group at the time of Ted Heath's Government. Now they are a prickly residue in the body politic, a nasty sort of gallstone."

The playwright David Edgar described the Monday Club, in 1986, as "proselytis[ing] the ancient and venerable conservative traditions of paternalism, imperialism and racism."

=== Old Guard departs ===
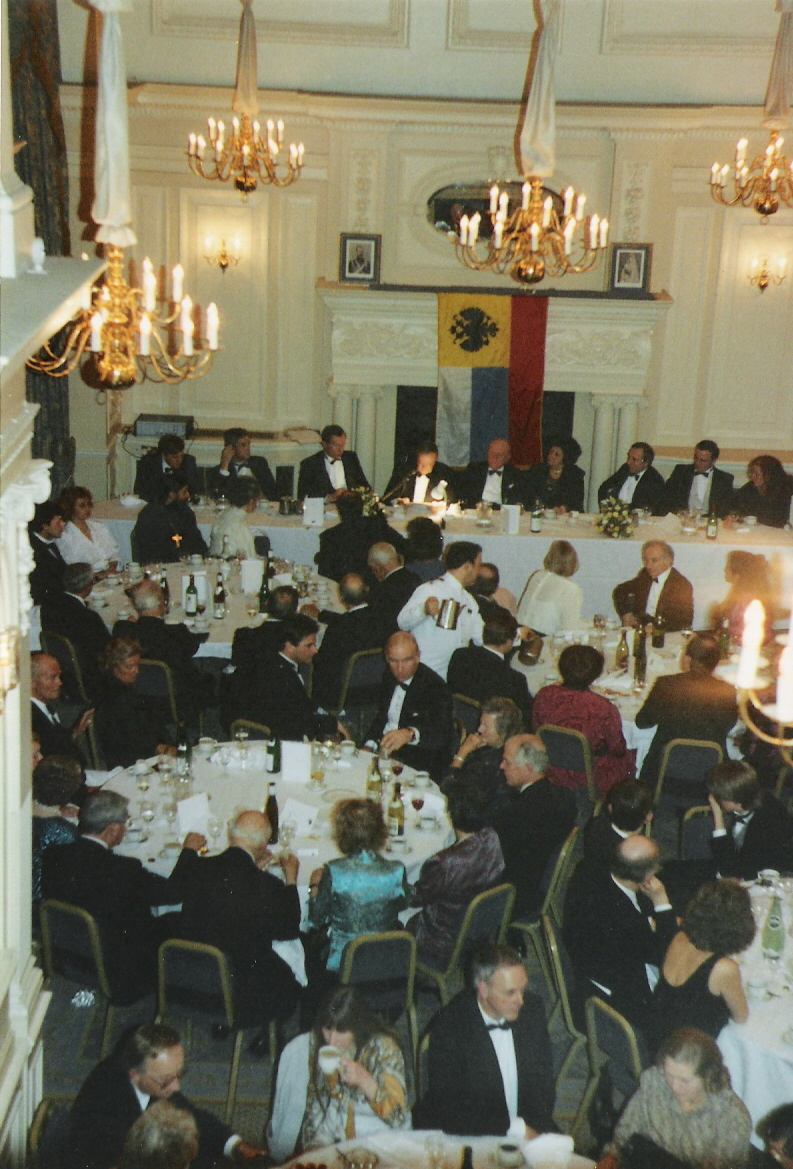
The Foreign Affairs Committee were responsible for the club's Russia Dinner on 11 January 1990, with Vladimir Cyrillovich, Grand Duke of Russia, pretender to the Imperial throne, being the guest-of-honour.

In 1988–89, a group of longstanding members, led by Gregory Lauder-Frost, the club's Foreign Affairs Committee chairman, succeeded in getting elected to the key posts on the Executive Council, with Dr. Mark Mayall as deputy chairman, and Lauder-Frost as the Political Secretary.

At the beginning of January 1991, the Monday Club News announced the abolition of the only salaried position, that of Director (then held by the club's Treasurer, Cedric Gunnery, one of the club's founders). Although this was due to the club's precarious financial state, some felt more sinister moves afoot. Negative news stories began emerging and resignations followed. An internal investigation followed. The chairman, David Storey, lost an almost unanimous vote of no confidence on 17 January 1991, and his membership was terminated by the club's Executive Council on 11 February on the grounds that "he has engaged in behaviour prejudicial to the best interests, reputation, objects, and other members of the Monday Club; by abusing his position as Chairman in encouraging members to leave the Monday Club and to join a new political group". Dr. Mayall became Acting Chairman until the May AGM when he was confirmed in that post by election. By 1992, the new team had the national (as opposed to branches) membership over 1600 again.

Lauder-Frost's resignation on 31 May 1992 saw the club descend into faction fighting and to a period of instability, with more departures and a resulting loss of membership and the club's influence declined. Subsequent failed expulsion attempts resulted in huge legal bills, and when Dr. Mark Mayall's term as chairman expired in April 1993 he left the group. Control passed effectively into the hands of Denis Walker, a former Methodist missionary, and later Minister for Education in the Rhodesian government. He changed the role of the club from a pressure group to a Conservative Party support group, bringing in a rule that all members must firstly be members of the party, something that prior to 1992 had been opposed.

== Organisation ==
=== Premises ===
The national club established its offices at 51–53 Victoria Street, a few minutes' walk from the Palace of Westminster. The club was, however, always a pressure group, remaining separate from the Conservative Party organisation. Around 1980, the Victoria Street building was cleared for demolition, and the club moved its offices to 122 Newgate Street, London, EC1, opposite the Old Bailey. High rents forced another move to 4 Orlando Road, Clapham Common. In 1991 the club's office was moved to an office belonging to W. Denis Walker, opposite Highams Park railway station in Waltham Forest, east London, with new telephone numbers, and a new Post Office box number in central London. The newsletter stated that "it is our long-term aim to relocate back to the very heart of London". Subsequently the club office moved to the premises of other companies associated with Walker, at 65 Chapel Hill, Bishop's Stortford, and Southmill Trading Centre, Bishop's Stortford, which according to Companies House was the current address as of January 2023.

=== Branches ===
In addition to the national club, which operated through an elected Executive Council and numerous policy groups or committees, there were semi-autonomous county branches, a Young Members Monday Club, and numerous university Monday Clubs, the most prominent and active being at the University of Oxford.

=== Policy committees ===
The Monday Club had various study groups (later renamed policy committees) including:

- Immigration and Repatriation: notable chairmen being George Kennedy Young CB, MBE; Harvey Proctor MP; The Honourable Jonathan Guinness; John Bercow, later an MP and former Speaker of the House of Commons, was committee secretary 1981–82;
- Africa and Rhodesia: Harold Soref MP
- Home Affairs;
- Aviation;
- Economics: George Kennedy Young CB, MBE; Geoffrey Baber, Piers Dixon MP
- Taxation: David Rowell, LL.B.
- Universities Group; Graham Webster-Gardiner, Richard Turnbull, Michael Clack
- Young Members Group; Christopher Horne, the Conservative Party candidate in both 1974 General Elections in the Manchester Central and Meriden Constituencies, Dr. Anna Bramwell, David Rowell, Eleanor Dodd, John R. Pinniger, AVR Smith, Rod Morris.
- Defence: The Honourable Archibald Hamilton MP; Major Sir Patrick Wall MP KBE, MC, VRD; Commander Anthony Courtney MP OBE; Rear-Admiral Martin Wemyss CB
- Foreign Affairs: Geoffrey Stewart-Smith MP; The Earl of Kimberley, John Carlisle MP and Gregory Lauder-Frost.

== Foreign affairs ==
=== Anti-communism ===
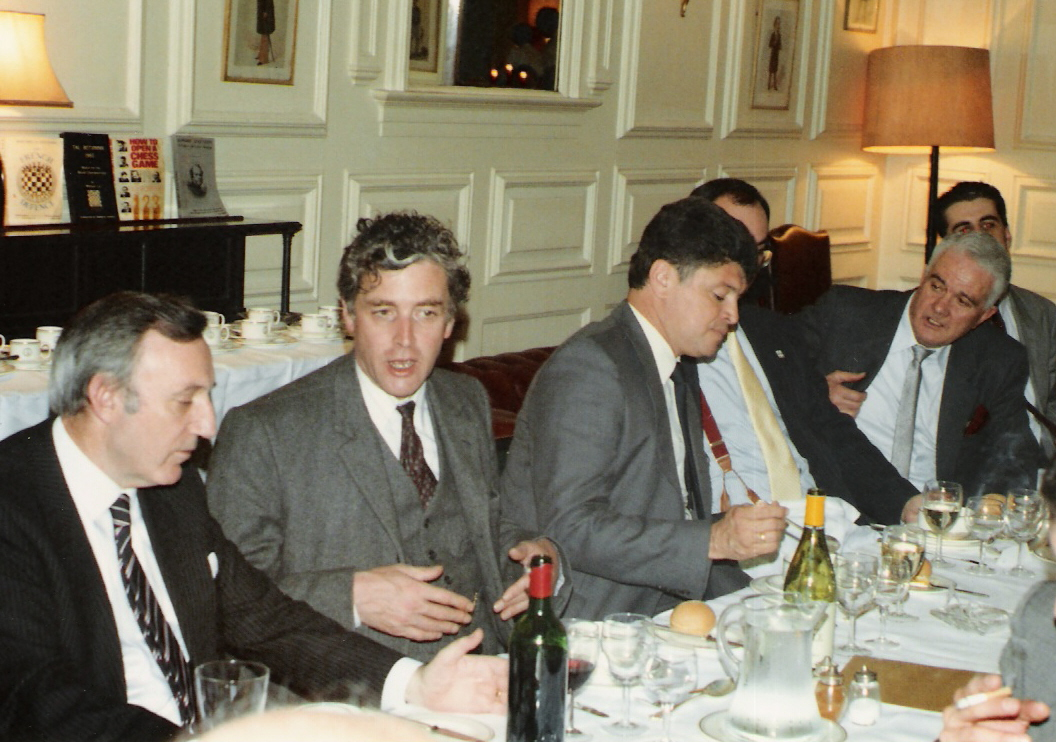
At the Western Goals Institute's El Salvador Dinner, London, 25 September 1989. L to R: Denis Walker, Lord Sudeley, El Salvador's Foreign Minister, Andrew Smith (yellow tie), Dr Harvey Ward

The club was anti-communist and had an active Defence Committee chaired for over 15 years by Sir Patrick Wall MP MC and produced much literature on the perceived threat posed by Soviets and communists everywhere.

When it appeared that communism was failing in the Eastern Bloc, the club's Foreign Affairs Committee in 1990 called upon Members of Parliament to be ready and to argue for the German borders to be restored to the position they stood at on 1 January 1938, saying there must be no gains for communism. By challenging the Oder-Neisse line, the club was arguing that Germany should take back all of the parts of Poland and the Soviet Union that been part of Germany in 1938, though what was to happen to the Poles living in such cites as Wrocław (formerly the German city of Breslau), Szczecin (formerly the German city of Stettin), and the Russians living in Kaliningrad (formerly the German city of Königsberg) was left unexplained.

Club officers, including Gregory Lauder-Frost, Denis Walker, and Lord Sudeley, attended a Western Goals Institute dinner in September 1989 in honour of Salvadorian president Alfredo Cristiani, whose military was at the time fighting the FMLN.

The club also took a hard line on the return of White Russians by the British Army to Joseph Stalin's Red Army in 1945–46, who executed nearly all of them. In this respect it gave its support to Count Nikolai Tolstoy, historian and author of Victims of Yalta and The Minister and the Massacres, who was then being sued for libel, by holding a dinner for him at London's Charing Cross Hotel on 26 October 1988.

=== Africa ===
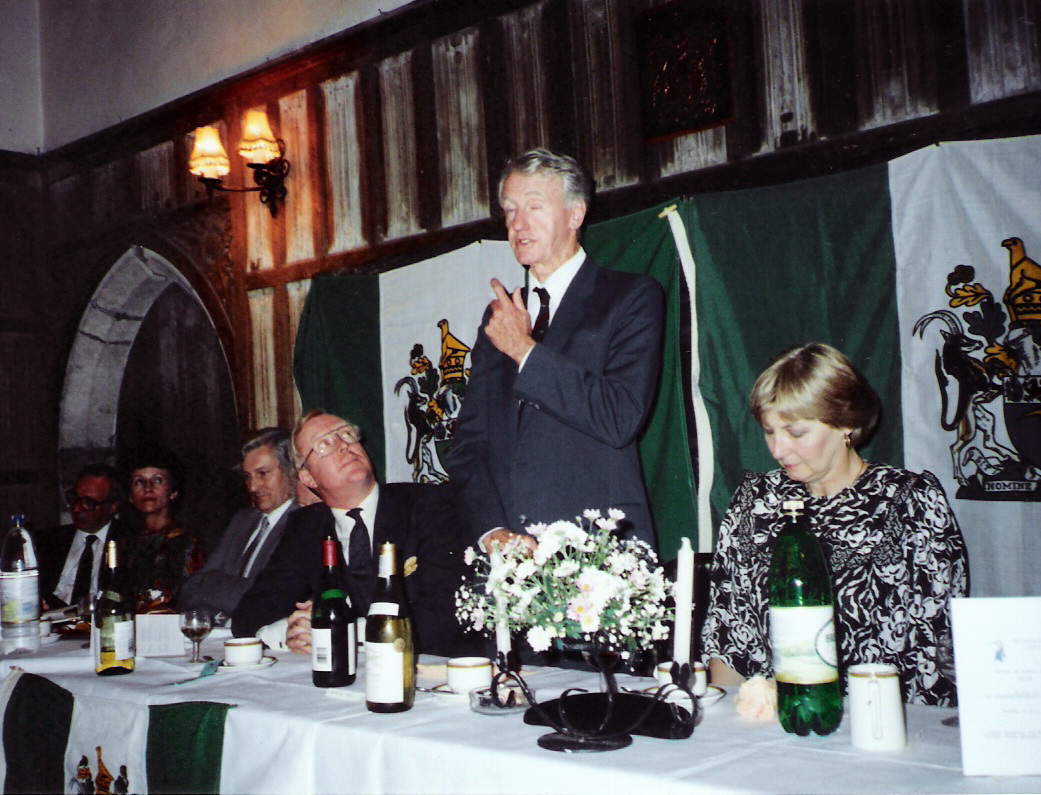
Ian Smith makes a point at a dinner organised in his honour by The Hon. Denis Walker (far left) at Lympne Castle, Kent, 23 July 1990. Smith is flanked by Nicholas and Ann Winterton, both MPs, and Rhodesian flags.

The club opposed what it described as the "premature" independence of Kenya, and the breakup of the Central African Federation, which was the subject of its first major public meeting in September 1961. It was fundamentally opposed to decolonisation, and defended white minority rule in South Africa and Rhodesia.

During the Unilateral Declaration of Independence (UDI) period in Rhodesia, the club strongly backed the White minority government of Ian Smith and the Rhodesian Front, being seen as its strongest supporters in Britain. In November 1963, the club had hosted a large reception for Smith at the Howard Hotel in London. That was followed the next year by receptions for Clifford Dupont and Moise Tshombe. The club continued its support for white minority rule in South Africa, with Lauder-Frost organising a large dinner in central London, on 5 June 1989, for its guest-of-honour Dr Andries Treurnicht, leader of the pro-apartheid Conservative Party of South Africa, and his delegation. Tim Janman MP and the Lord Sudeley were amongst those present from Parliament.

=== Croatia ===
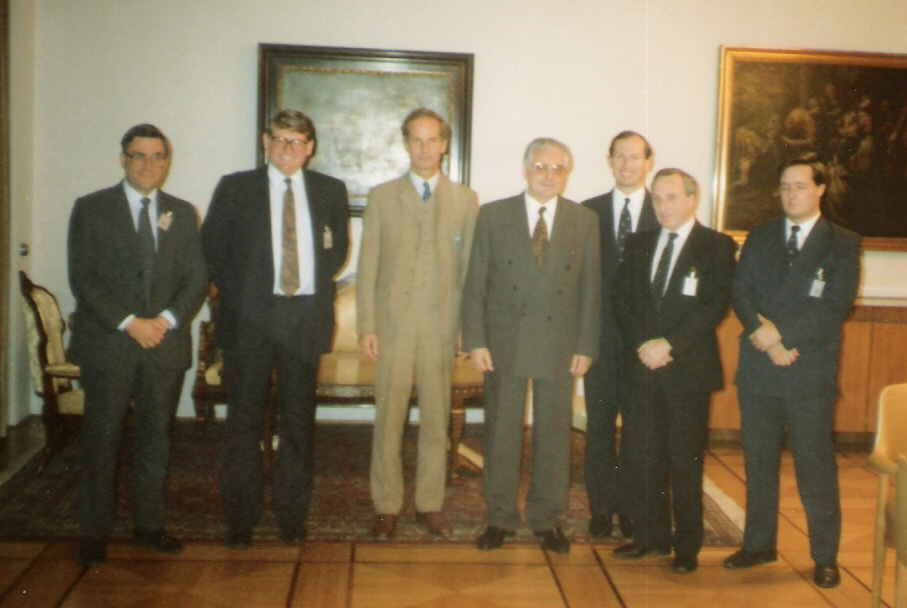
Meet the President: The Monday Club delegation to Croatia, 12 October 1991: L to R: Roger Knapman MP, Andrew Hunter MP, Count Nikolai Tolstoy, President Franjo Tuđman, Gregory Lauder-Frost, The Hon. Denis Walker, Rod Morris.

The government of Franjo Tuđman in Croatia invited the Monday Club to send a delegation to observe its conflict with Serbia, in October 1991, when the war for Croatian independence from the tottering Yugoslavia was at its height, with the armies of both sides engaged in serious fighting. The club delegation arrived just days after the Yugoslav Air Force bombing of the historic upper city in Zagreb. It was the first British political delegation to go to Croatia during the conflict.

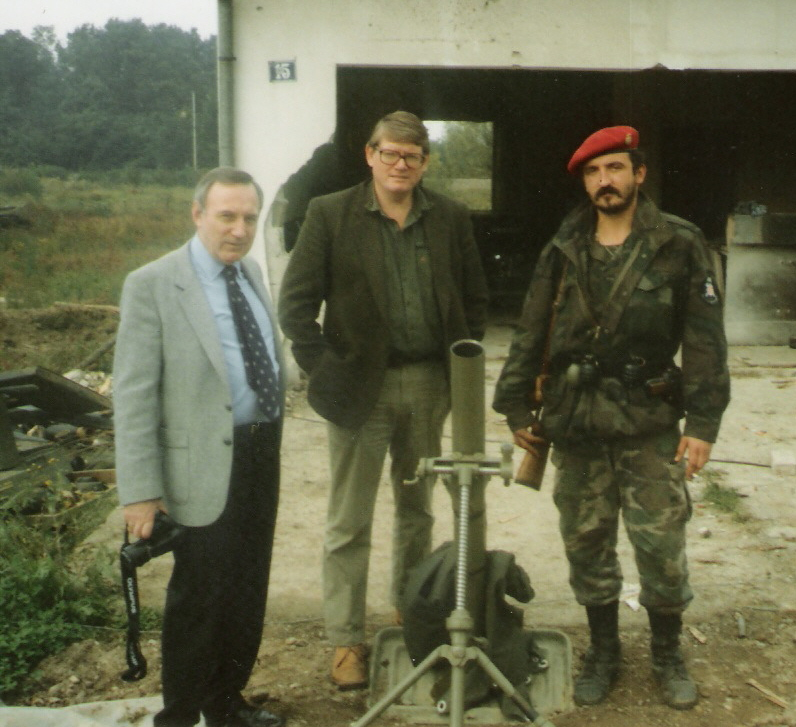
Denis Walker and Andrew Hunter MP on the Croatia-Serbia front line as part of the Monday Club delegation, 12 October 1991

=== European Union ===
Debate within the club was intense on the European Union. In the early days of the European Economic Community (EEC) one of the club's MPs, Geoffrey Rippon, was so pro-EEC that he was known as "Mr. Europe". Because of the divisions within the club on this issue the decision was taken not to have a policy on it. However, by 1980 the mood had changed. A club discussion paper in October 1980 was entitled Do Tories Really want to Scrap 80% of Britain's Fishing Fleet, and the club adopted a firm anti-European Union (EU) position. Teddy Taylor, an anti-EEC MP, became chairman of the club's EEC Affairs Policy Committee and authored a club policy paper in December 1982 entitled Proposals to Rescue the British Fishing Industry. The club's Scottish branch's newspaper, The Challenger, carried a further article against the EEC by Taylor in September 1985 entitled "Swallowing the Nation".

Enoch Powell also spoke against the EEC at one of the Monday Club's fringe meetings at the Conservative Party Conference at Blackpool on 8 October 1991, with Lauder-Frost presiding, which was filmed and broadcast on BBC TV's Newsnight that night. In 1992, the chairman, Dr. Mark Mayall, authored another club booklet entitled: Maastricht: The High Tide of European Federalism, a fierce attack on the EEC.

== Immigration ==
In September 1972, the club held a "Halt Immigration Now!" public meeting in Westminster Central Hall, opposite Parliament, at which the speakers, MPs Ronald Bell, John Biggs-Davison, Harold Soref, and John Heydon Stokes (all club members) called on the government to halt all immigration, repeal the Race Relations Act, (not the separate Commonwealth Immigrants Act 1968), and start a full repatriation scheme. A resolution was drafted, approved by the meeting, and delivered to the Prime Minister, Edward Heath, who replied that "the government had no intention of repealing the Race Relations Act". When Reginald Maudling resigned from the Cabinet, the Liberal leader, Jeremy Thorpe, commented that "Mr. Heath has been left to wrestle with the Monday Club single-handed."

In October 1982, the Monday Club published a slightly revised, policy on immigration. It called for:

1. Scrapping of the Commission for Racial Equality and Community Relations Councils.
2. Repeal of the race relations laws.
3. An end to the use of race or colour as criteria for the distribution of state benefits and loans.
4. An end to positive discrimination.
5. To bring an end to large-scale permanent immigration from the New Commonwealth.
6. An improved repatriation scheme with generous resettlement grants for all those who wish to take advantage of them.

Although more explicit in detail, the general thrust of policy accorded with that found in the Conservative Party manifesto published ahead of the general election the following year.

The club's position on immigration was reiterated in a letter in The Times from Lauder-Frost on the club's behalf in October 1991, in which he stated that the annual levels of immigration "were unacceptable".

== Northern Ireland ==
Following an Official Irish Republican Army (IRA) bombing at Aldershot, Hampshire, in February 1972, club member and MP Jill Knight called for legislation to outlaw the Official IRA and its political wing, Sinn Féin (Official). The club was opposed to the dismantling of the Stormont government in Northern Ireland and the imposition of direct rule.

== Controversies and criticism ==
The Guardian claimed back in 1968 that the organisation was "probably the nearest British equivalent to the American John Birch Society". It was claimed by opponents that the National Front had started an active programme of entryism into the organisation, mainly via the growing number of regional branches. Throughout the early part of the 1970s the leadership stepped up its efforts considerably to try to address this issue. A new standardised set of rules and procedures were instituted which sought to institute a far greater level of centralised control over the growth and activity of the regional branches. There were a number of expulsions, and some branches were forced to disband.

On 24 February 1991, The Observer ran a lengthy article entitled "Far Right takes over the Monday Club", stating that a number of senior members had tendered their resignations in protest at the club's "takeover" by "extreme right-wingers." The club's solicitors, Rubenstein, Callingham & Gale, sent a formal letter of protest to the editor of The Observer about the article, and demanded a right of reply for the club. The editor agreed and Lauder-Frost, writing on behalf of the club, subsequently challenged the article's accusations in a Letter to the Editor, which was published the following Sunday. He denied that a takeover had occurred, said that none of the club's policies had changed and that its direction was consistent with its aims and historical principles. Faction fighting within the club following Lauder-Frost's departure at the end of May 1992 led to a period of instability and a resulting loss of membership. The club's influence declined.

== Suspension of links by the Conservative Party (2001) ==
After the defeats in the 1997 general election and 2001 general election, the Conservative Party began decisive moves towards becoming more centrist; the 2002–2003 party chairman and future Prime Minister, Theresa May, would later state that it had been perceived by voters as the "Nasty Party". The then party leader, Iain Duncan Smith, suspended the Monday Club's longstanding links with the party in October 2001, saying his party would have nothing to do with the organisation unless it stopped making "distasteful" remarks on race and immigration.

Although the Monday Club was a completely autonomous pressure-group and not part of the Conservative Party organisation, Conservative Party chairman David Davis then informed the club's National Executive that links between it and the party were being severed until it stopped promoting several of its (long-held and established) policies such as the voluntary repatriation of ethnic minorities. Davis later told the media: "I have told them that until a number of things are concluded—particularly some concerns about the membership of the club, and a review of the club's constitution and a requirement that the club will not promulgate or discuss policies relating to race—the club is suspended from any association with the Conservative party". Three MPs, Andrew Hunter, Andrew Rosindell and Angela Watkinson, were ordered to resign from the club.

== Later years and disbanding ==
From 1993, new full members of the club had to be members of the Conservative Party, though there was no such requirement for associate membership. Monday Club observers, such as Denis Walker, have attended Democratic Unionist Party conferences.

In 2002, the club was described as a "bastion on the Tory hard right" by BBC News Online. The club's agenda stressed support for what it calls "traditional Conservative values", including "resistance to 'political correctness'".

On 10 May 2002, the BBC reported that the club sought to restore its links with the Conservative Party.

The Times reported on 2 June 2006 that, as the club "is now slowly nudging back into the mainstream, many members feel that it is time to return to the fold". Having returned to being a much smaller organisation, the Club continued to lobby Parliamentarians, to publish comment pieces and an annual journal. It also organised occasional meetings and hosted dinners in London. Speakers included MPs Christopher Chope, Andrew Rosindell and Ian Paisley Jr, Arlene Foster, and cleric Michael Nazir-Ali.

The group's website listed its priorities as the maintenance of the monarchy and the Union; protecting the "family unit"; restoring law and order; opposition to Britain's membership in the EU; promoting a "sound economy" and a "robust defence capability"; opposition to "political correctness" and maintaining traditional values.

With the emergence of groups such as Conservative Alliance for Britain and Popular Conservatives, the Club's place as the flag bearer of the traditional right tendency was largely superseded. For this reason, coupled with a declining membership and increasingly straightened finances, the Club's Executive reluctantly came to the decision to disband the organisation in July 2024.
