= Chigwell (constituency) =

Parliamentary constituency in the United Kingdom, 1955–1974

- Former county constituency for the House of Commons

1955–February 1974
- Seats: one
- Created from: Chelmsford and Woodford
- Replaced by: Brentwood and Ongar and Epping Forest

Chigwell was a parliamentary constituency represented in the House of Commons of the Parliament of the United Kingdom from 1955 to 1974. It elected one Member of Parliament (MP) by the first past the post system of election.

== History ==
The constituency was created for the 1955 general election as a result of the First Periodic Review of Westminster constituencies. The seat was abolished by the Second Review for the February 1974 general election when the bulk of the electorate formed the basis of the new constituency of Epping Forest, together with parts of the abolished constituency of Epping.

== Boundaries ==
The constituency consisted of the Urban District of Chigwell (transferred from Woodford) and the Rural District of Ongar (transferred from Chelmsford).

On abolition, Chigwell, which comprised the bulk of the constituency, was included in the new constituency of Epping Forest and the Rural District of Ongar (now part of the merged Rural District of Epping and Ongar) was included in the new constituency of Brentwood and Ongar. A small part in the south (part of Hainault) had been absorbed into the London Borough of Redbridge on its creation within Greater London and was now added to Ilford North.

== Members of Parliament ==
Year	Member	Party	Notes
1955	John Biggs-Davison	Conservative	
1974	constituency abolished		

== Elections ==
=== Elections in the 1950s ===
General election 1955: Chigwell
Party	Candidate	Votes	%	±%
Conservative	John Biggs-Davison	19,503	52.5	
Labour Co-op	Douglas Clark	17,628	47.5	
Majority		1,875	5.0	
Turnout		37,131	79.7	
Conservative win (new seat)				

General election 1959: Chigwell
Party	Candidate	Votes	%	±%
Conservative	John Biggs-Davison	23,422	56.7	+4.2
Labour	Tony Harman	17,860	43.3	−4.2
Majority		5,562	13.4	+8.4
Turnout		41,282	82.2	+2.5
Conservative hold		Swing	+4.2	

=== Elections in the 1960s ===
General election 1964: Chigwell
Party	Candidate	Votes	%	±%
Conservative	John Biggs-Davison	20,699	47.3	−9.4
Labour	Eric Moonman	16,978	38.8	−4.4
Liberal	Gudrun Claire Collis	6,058	13.9	New
Majority		3,721	8.5	−4.9
Turnout		43,735	81.9	−0.3
Conservative hold		Swing	−2.5	

General election 1966: Chigwell
Party	Candidate	Votes	%	±%
Conservative	John Biggs-Davison	20,906	47.2	−0.1
Labour	Eric Deakins	18,338	41.4	+2.6
Liberal	Gudrun Claire Collis	5,007	11.3	−2.6
Majority		2,568	5.8	−2.7
Turnout		44,251	81.3	−0.6
Conservative hold		Swing	−1.4	

=== Elections in the 1970s ===
General election 1970: Chigwell
Party	Candidate	Votes	%	±%
Conservative	John Biggs-Davison	26,404	59.5	+12.3
Labour	William J Sheaff	17,972	40.5	−0.9
Majority		8,432	19.0	+13.2
Turnout		44,376	72.7	−8.6
Conservative hold		Swing	+6.6	

== Boundary changes ==
Preceded by Woodford	UK Parliament constituency^{Loughton, Chigwell, Buckhurst Hill} 1955 – 1974	Succeeded by Epping Forest
Preceded by Chelmsford	UK Parliament constituency^{Ongar} 1955 – 1974	Succeeded by Brentwood and Ongar

== Sources ==
- Leigh Rayment's Historical List of MPs – Constituencies beginning with "C" (part 4)
