= John Bilson =

John Bilson may refer to:

- John Bilson (politician) (died 2000s), Ghanaian politician and doctor
- John F. O. Bilson (born 1948), Australian economic academic
- John Bilson (architect) (1856–1943), British architect and architectural historian
