= Thomas Bilson (disambiguation) =

Thomas Bilson (1547–1616) was an English clergyman, Bishop of Worcester and Winchester, and translator of the King James Bible

Thomas Bilson may also refer to:

- Thomas Bilson (MP for Winchester) (1592–c. 1647), English politician (son of the bishop)
- Thomas Bilson (died 1692) (1655–1692), English politician, MP for Petersfield (grandson of the MP for Winchester)
