= John Biggs-Davison =

British politician (1918–1988)

Sir John Biggs-Davison
- Sir John Biggs-Davison

Member of Parliament for Epping Forest (1974–1988) Chigwell (1955–1974)
- In office 26 May 1955 – 17 September 1988
- Preceded by: Constituency established
- Succeeded by: Steven Norris

Personal details
- Born: John Alec Biggs-Davison; 7 June 1918 Bournemouth, England
- Died: 17 September 1988 (aged 70) Taunton, England
- Party: Conservative (after 1930s)
- Other political affiliations: Communist Party of Great Britain (c. 1930s)
- Spouse: Pamela Holder-Williams (m. 1948)
- Children: 6
- Education: Magdalen College, Oxford

Sir John Alec Biggs-Davison (7 June 1918 – 17 September 1988) was a Conservative Member of Parliament in the United Kingdom for Chigwell from 1955 and then, after boundary changes in 1974, Epping Forest until his death. He was a leading figure in the Conservative Monday Club.

== Early years ==
The son of Major John Norman Biggs-Davison, Royal Garrison Artillery, (d. 1972), of Somerset, and his wife Sarah (née Wright), John Alec Biggs-Davison was born at Boscombe, Bournemouth, raised a Roman Catholic, and educated at Clifton College and Magdalen College, Oxford. While at university, he was a member of the Communist Party of Great Britain.

== Political career ==
As an Oxford undergraduate, he was seconder to Basil Liddell Hart opposing conscription at the Oxford Union debate held on 27 April 1939. He joined the Royal Marines in 1939. From 1942 he worked for the Indian Civil Service and the Pakistan Administrative Service, where he was an assistant commissioner in the Punjab before being deputed to Bengal. He was the Conservative candidate for Coventry South in the 1951 general election. He became a Conservative Party Member of Parliament in 1955 but resigned the Conservative Whip and sat as an Independent 1957–58 in opposition to the government's withdrawal from Suez following direct pressure from the US and Soviet governments. He subsequently resumed the Conservative Whip.

Despite wariness of the United States, he supported the setting up of an American-style broadcasting system in the UK; shortly before the Marine Broadcasting Offences Act became law in 1967, he was heard on the offshore station Radio 270 stating that "a voice of freedom will have been silenced when Radio 270 goes off the air" (ref. The Times, 11 August 1967).

When some Labour Party members called for his old friend Enoch Powell to be prosecuted under the Race Relations Act (see Letter-to-the-Editor, Daily Telegraph 22 November 1968), Biggs-Davison leapt to Powell's defence in an acrimonious House of Commons debate during which Harold Wilson was accused of being an enemy of free speech.

In late January 1975, he gave a warning that the Azores could become a Soviet naval base instead of American because of the revolution in Portugal. That year, during a House of Commons debate on the Trades Union Congress invitation to Alexander Shelepin, the former Soviet KGB Chief, to visit Britain, Biggs-Davison compared him to Heinrich Himmler.

He was the Conservative Party's Opposition Shadow Cabinet Spokesman for Northern Ireland, 1976–78, and was also Vice-Chairman of the Conservative Party's Foreign and Commonwealth Affairs Committee, and a member of the 1922 Committee Executive. He was made a Knight Bachelor in the 1981 Birthday Honours. The Primrose League Gazette carried an obituary in the form of a tribute to Biggs-Davison in their November/December 1988 edition.

== Monday Club ==
Biggs-Davison was an active member of the Conservative Monday Club from 1962 until his death. He spoke on their behalf on many occasions both inside and out of the House of Commons, and wrote numerous papers for the Club, and forewords to others. He was one of the principal speakers at Duncan Sandys' "Peace with Rhodesia" rally in Trafalgar Square in January 1967, which was broadcast. The Club held a 'Law and Liberty' May Day Rally in 1970, again in Trafalgar Square, at which Biggs-Davison was a main speaker. He likened the suspension and subsequent abolition of the Parliament of Northern Ireland to "someone sawing away the branch he bestraddles". He was re-elected a member of the Club's Executive Council on 5 June 1972.

In July 1972, he called for tough action in Northern Ireland to clean up the 'No-Go' areas, and was one of the main speakers at the Club's "Halt Immigration Now!" meeting in Westminster Central Hall in September 1972, at the end of which a resolution was passed calling on the government to halt all immigration, repeal the 1968 Race Relations Act, and start a full repatriation scheme. This was delivered to the Prime Minister, Edward Heath, who stated that the government had no intention of repealing the Act.

In the House of Commons in March 1973, Sir Alec Douglas-Home rejected a suggestion from John Biggs-Davison that Britain should deduct aid funds from Zambia and Tanzania sufficient to compensate victims in Rhodesia of armed attacks mounted from those countries. In October that year, he called for the Provisional Irish Republican Army to be also proscribed in the island of Great Britain, as it already was in the whole of Ireland. At the end of 1973, Biggs-Davison's book, The Hand is Red was published, which traces the history of Ireland, notably in the 20th century. He said that the Provisional IRA was infiltrated by Communists and Trotskyists, and part of an international subversion and terrorist network.

In May 1974, Biggs-Davison was re-elected unopposed as Chairman of the Monday Club. That month, Robert Taylor, Patrick Wall and John Biggs-Davison tabled a motion in the House of Commons deploring the Labour government's decision to cancel the visit to Cape Town by the Royal Yacht Britannia. He subsequently spoke at Essex University, but had to have police protection, while a mob outside demonstrated singing "The Red Flag". In June, he raised the matter of the IRA's London march with the Home Secretary and asked why it had not been banned under the Public Order Act.

When Aleksandr Solzhenitsyn's book The Gulag Archipelago was banned from United Nations bookstalls in Geneva, on the grounds that it was offensive to a member nation, John Biggs-Davison asked James Callaghan, then Foreign Secretary, if he was satisfied that nothing offensive to the United Kingdom was sold at UN headquarters.

In November 1974, he was elected Chairman of the Conservative Parliamentary Northern Ireland Committee. Biggs-Davison criticised an ITV interview with IRA leader Dáithí Ó Conaill the same month. He called for reciprocity over extradition with the Republic.

He was one of a number of prominent speakers at the Monday Club two-day Conference in Birmingham in March 1975, the title of which was The Conservative Party and the Crisis in Britain. He was elected National Club Chairman the following May, for a two-year term.

== Personal life and death ==
In 1948, he married Pamela, daughter of Ralph Hodder-Williams, MC. They had two sons and four daughters: Tom, Harry, Bella, Helena, Lisl and Sara.

Biggs-Davison died at a hospital in Taunton, Somerset, on 17 September 1988, aged 70. In the subsequent by-election, his seat was won by Conservative Steven Norris.

== Publications ==
- Biggs-Davison, John, MP, The Uncertain Ally, London, 1957.
- Biggs-Davison, John, MP, with Jeremy Harwood and the Hon. Jonathan Guinness, Ireland - Our Cuba?, published by the Monday Club, 1970, (P/B).
- Biggs-Davison, John, MP, The Hand is Red, London, 1973.
- Biggs-Davison, John, MP, with Julian Amery, MP, Stephen Hastings, MC, MP, Harold Soref (former MP), and Patrick Wall, MC, MP, Rhodesia and the Threat to the West, published by the Monday Club, London, 1976, (P/B).
- Biggs-Davison, John, MP, The Cross of St. Patrick - The Catholic Unionist Tradition in Ireland, London, 1985.
- Biggs-Davison, John, MP, Peace and Freedom, in the Primrose League Gazette, vol.89, no.3, Nov/Dec 1985, London.

Parliament of the United Kingdom
| New constituency | Member of Parliament for Chigwell; 1955–Feb 1974 | Constituency abolished |
| New constituency | Member of Parliament for Epping Forest; Feb 1974–1988 | Succeeded by Steven Norris |
Party political offices
| Preceded by Jonathan Guinness | Chairman of the Monday Club; March 1974 – March 1976 | Succeeded by Sir Victor Raikes KBE |
