= Leonard Bilson =

Leonard Bilson may refer to:

- Leonard Bilson (1616–1695), Member of Parliament for Petersfield 1677–85
- Leonard Bilson (1681–1715), Member of Parliament for Petersfield 1704–15
