= John R. Pinniger =

British politician

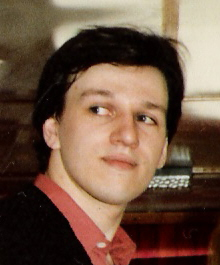
John Pinniger at a Monday Club Young Members' Group event, 15 July 1981

John R Pinniger is a former Conservative councillor for the London Borough of Lambeth and an unsuccessful Conservative candidate for the European Parliament. He was a leading activist and political adviser in the right-wing Conservative Monday Club during the early 1980s but found himself at centre of a schism in the club in 1984.

== Monday Club split ==
Pinniger worked closely with the Conservative Member of Parliament Harvey Proctor, who was then Chairman of the Monday Club's Immigration and Repatriation Committee. In 1981 he co-authored a pamphlet with Proctor which called for the repatriation of 50,000 immigrants per year, the abolition of the Commission for Racial Equality and the repeal of all race relations legislation. His proposals were defended on the grounds that they would reduce racial tension.

In March 1984, Pinniger announced that he would be resigning, in protest, from the Monday Club. He told the media that there were members who were "simply anti-immigrant and anti-black – that is, racist" who wanted to expel immigrants from the UK. He also described the club as "fizzling out" and being out of touch with the Conservative mainstream.

The club fought back strongly, circulating copies of speeches and pamphlets by Pinniger about immigration and claiming that he had been a prominent advocate of policies which he now labelled extremist. It accused him of trying to "cover up the fact that the club had suspended him and certain associates, with a view to possible expulsion." The club also said that Pinniger had been responsible for a "clandestine and unethical plot" to mount a take-over and that "his outrage at the club's policies is fake, and that his current manoeuvres are an attempt to destroy that which he cannot control."

The club subsequently produced a document that it claimed to be the minutes of a body called the Camberley Group, said to have been formed by Pinniger and others as the vehicle for a take-over bid. It was dismissed by Pinniger as a forgery and passed on to the police for examination. Members of the Camberley Group were reported to have said that the group was "formed to moderate the [Monday] club and steer it back into the mainstream of Conservative policy because it had failed to purge itself of extremists."

== Political career ==
Pinniger later successfully contested a seat on Lambeth Council as well as working as the head of communications for the Financial Intermediaries, Managers and Brokers Regulatory Association.

In the 1994 European elections he unsuccessfully stood for the European Parliament as a Conservative candidate in the constituency of Greater Manchester East (now part of the North West England constituency), a safe Labour seat. He came second to the Labour candidate, winning 19.32% of the vote as against the winning candidate's 60.44%.

== Publications ==
- Immigration, Repatriation, & the Commission for Racial Equality, by Harvey Proctor, MP, John R. Pinniger, MA, with a foreword by Sir Ronald Bell, QC, MP, published by the Monday Club, 1981, (P/B)
- Immigration - An Untenable Situation by K.Harvey Proctor, MP, and John R. Pinniger, MA, Policy Paper from the Monday Club's Immigration and Repatriation Policy Committee, October 1981
- Race Relations & Immigration by K.Harvey Proctor, MP, and John R. Pinniger, MA, Policy Paper from the Monday Club's Immigration & Race Relations Committee, October 1982
