= Harold Soref =

British politician

Member of Parliament for Ormskirk
- In office 18 June 1970 – 8 February 1974
- Preceded by: Douglas Glover
- Succeeded by: Robert Kilroy-Silk

Personal details
- Born: 18 December 1916 London, England
- Died: 14 March 1993 (aged 76)
- Party: Conservative
- Education: Queen's College, Oxford, England

Harold Benjamin Soref (18 December 1916—14 March 1993) was a Conservative Member of Parliament (MP) in the United Kingdom for Ormskirk, Lancashire, first elected at the 1970 general election. He subsequently lost the seat to Labour in February 1974. Soref was a leading member of the Conservative Monday Club.

== Early life ==
Harold Soref was the son of Paul Soref, a merchant shipper of Romanian Jewish origin, and his wife Zelma (née Goodman), who lived in Hampstead, north west London. Harold was educated at Hall School, Hampstead, and St. Paul's School, Hammersmith, before going up to Queen's College, Oxford. In World War II, he served with the Royal Scots regiment, and with the Intelligence Corps from 1940 to 1946.

== Political career ==
Soref had an early interest in colonial affairs, and was an elected delegate, in 1937, to the first All-British Africa Conference at Bulawayo in Southern Rhodesia, held with the intention of forming the Africa Defence Federation. He was a founder member of the Conservative Commonwealth Council, a member of the governing council of the Anglo-Rhodesian Society, and the Anglo-Zanzibar Society. Soref was also a member of Sir Oswald Mosley's British Union of Fascists, and a standard bearer at the BUF's 1934 Olympia meeting.

In 1951, he was the Conservative Party's prospective parliamentary candidate in Dudley, and again in 1955, for Rugby; he was unsuccessful on both occasions. Soref was elected as the Conservative MP for Ormskirk in 1970 but, as it was a marginal constituency, and following boundary changes, he lost it in 1974 to Labour's Robert Kilroy-Silk.

== Monday Club ==
Soref was an early member (in 1963) of the Conservative Monday Club, a right-wing grouping in the party. He served a term as its National Vice-Chairman, and was for some time a very active Chairman of their Africa and Rhodesia study groups and policy committees. He was several times a member of the club's executive council, including from 1970 to 1975.

In July 1972, Soref had discussions, on behalf of the Monday Club, with the Home Office, on the 1,500 Trotskyists camping in Essex, which included groups from North America. They were, he said, being given instruction in urban guerrilla warfare. Soref and Patrick Wall, a fellow MP, also raised the issue of 'educational kits' being distributed to secondary schools, which were said to contain information on guerrilla warfare tactics in Southern Africa. They described the kits as "subversive Communist propaganda".

Soref condemned Idi Amin's decision to expel Ugandan Asians with British passports as "discriminatory racialism". He was a leading speaker at the Monday Club's "Halt Immigration Now" rally in Westminster Central Hall the same year, when a resolution was passed calling on the government to halt all immigration, repeal the Race Relations Act (1968), and start a full repatriation scheme.

On 30 September 1972, the Daily Telegraph remarked that "Mr. Harold Soref is nothing if not consistent", commenting that when an all-party delegation began a tour of Red China, he left defiantly for Taiwan.

In October 1972, Soref said that the Irish Republican Army (IRA) were planning a direct assault in England, and that the IRA were receiving weapons from Libya, as well as detailing their contacts with other terrorist movements.

In August 1973, in the House of Commons, Soref told the Minister of Agriculture that it was "preposterous" that British housewives should have to pay high prices for beef when there were plentiful supplies available in Rhodesia. In September, he protested to Sir Alec Douglas-Home that Herbert Chitepo, whom Soref described as a "terrorist", had received a British passport 'in error', and said that London was being turned into an 'open house' for about 50 revolutionary movements.

In 1973, Soref successfully fought the Home Office deportation order against New Zealander Peter Wildermoth, and his intercessions, in December 1973, secured the freedom of Gerald Hawksworth, who was imprisoned in Tanzania after being kidnapped by the Zimbabwe African National Union. He subsequently gave a Monday Club dinner at Westminster Palace to celebrate Hawksworth's release.

In 1974, Soref was appointed as the Monday Club's vice-chairman, and spoke at Oxford University in May that year. He had a police escort into the building, but gangs of left-wing students with masked faces howling "Death to Soref" forced their way into the hall; he was forced to escape violence down a back staircase and over a six-foot wall, with his pursuers close behind, jumping onto the back of his car as it drew away. Later that night, the Chairman of the Oxford University Monday Club, Andrew Bell, the son of MP Ronald Bell, had his bedroom window smashed by hand-thrown missiles.

Soref, as Chairman of the club's Africa Group, often had letters published in the press criticising Labour politician James Callaghan's "biased attitudes on Rhodesia where communist-supported guerillas were in action". He had also said that "the Secretary of State during his recent safari displayed his dedication to 'Black Power'". Another of his protests was to Lord Aylestone of the Independent Broadcasting Authority over the Weekend World television programme about Rhodesia which, he said, "gave more support to terrorists than to their victims."

Soref was an outspoken critic of the IRA, and issued a press statement on behalf of the Monday Club in November 1974 calling for capital punishment "for traitors and those engaged in civil war". The previous month, gunmen shot at a London businessman's chauffeur-driven car close to Soref's residence, and Scotland Yard were convinced that it was mistaken identity and the work of the IRA, because of the striking resemblance between the victim, who later died, and Soref. The shooting had taken place at the time Soref normally arrived home, but he had been delayed that night. Both the victim and Soref had similar cars. Later, Soref received an anonymous telephone call saying that the shots were meant for him.

On 26 January 1981, Soref presided at the Monday Club's Africa Group Dinner at St Stephen's Club, Westminster, when the MP Nicholas Winterton was the guest of honour.

== Business career ==
In 1947, Soref founded Jewish Monthly magazine, which he also edited until 1951.

From 1959, Soref was Managing Director of Soref Brothers Limited, becoming Chairman in 1976, and remaining at the firm until 1988.

== Personal life and death ==
Soref died in London on 14 March 1993, aged 76.

== Sources ==
- Dod's Parliamentary Companion 1973, 160th edition, Sell's Publications Ltd., Epsom, Surrey.
- Copping, Robert, The Monday Club - Crisis and After (Foreword by John Biggs-Davison, M.P.), Current Affairs Information Service, Ilford, Essex, May 1975, (P/B), pps: 6 - 10,15,16,18, 22–23.
- Soref, Harold, with John Biggs-Davison, M.P., Julian Amery, M.P., Stephen Hastings, M.C., M.P., and Patrick Wall, M.C., M.P., Rhodesia and the Threat to the West, Monday Club, London, 1976, (P/B).
- Who's Who, London, 1986, p. 1631, ISBN 0-7136-2760-3

Parliament of the United Kingdom
Preceded by Douglas Glover	Member for Ormskirk; 1970–1974	Succeeded by Robert Kilroy-Silk
