= El Bolsón, Catamarca =

Coordinates: 27°55′S 65°53′W

El Bolsón
- Municipality and village
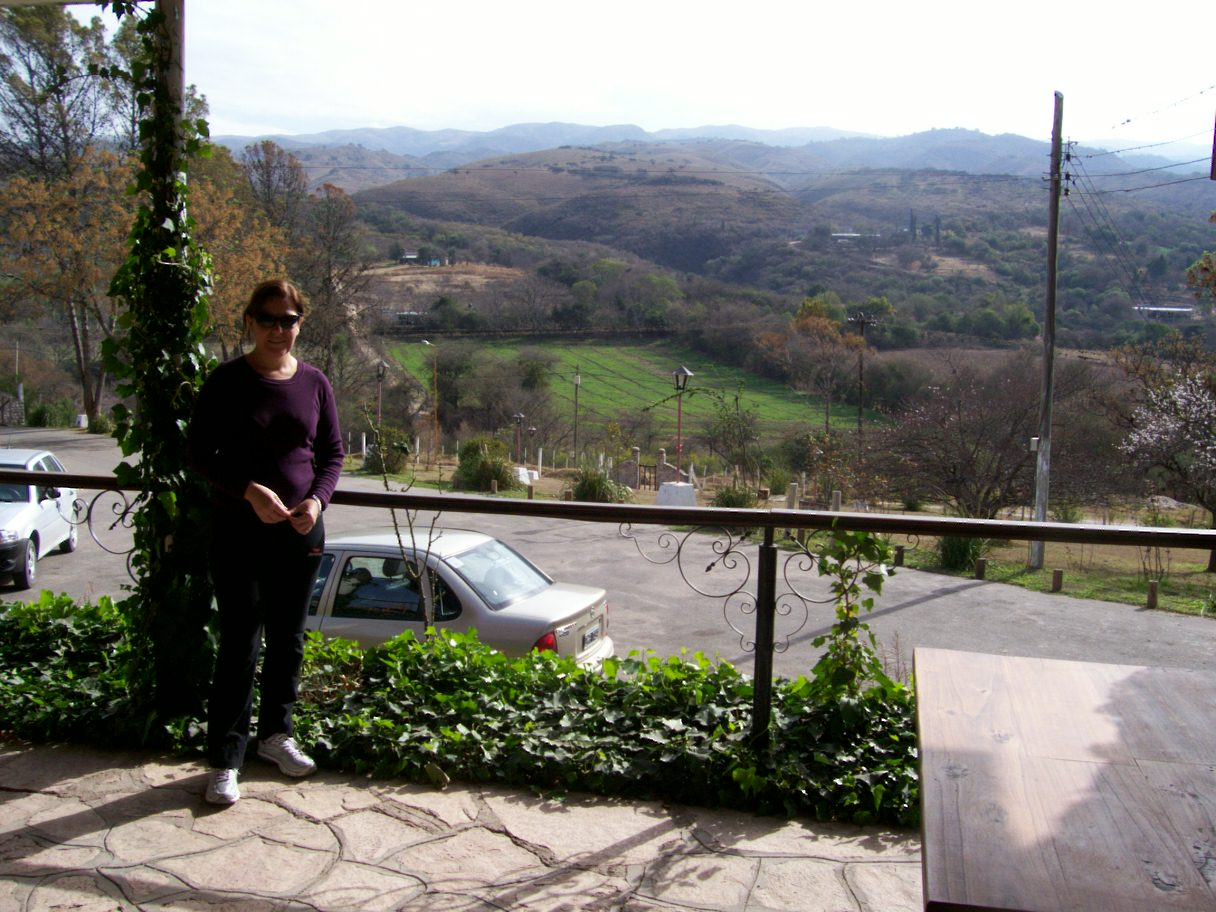
- El Bolsón, desde la Hostería - panoramio
- Interactive map of El Bolsón
- Country: Argentina
- Province: Catamarca
- Department: Ambato
- Time zone: UTC−3 (ART)

El Bolsón is a village and municipality in Catamarca Province in northwestern Argentina.
