= Belson =

The surname Belson may refer to:

- Charles Belson (1773–1830), British Army officer of the Napoleonic Era
- Flavien Belson (born 1987), footballer
- Frederick Belson (1874–1952), English rugby union player
- Jerry Belson (1938–2006), director and producer
- Jordan Belson (1926–2011), artist
- Kristine Belson, film producer
- Thomas Belson (? – 1589)
- Belson Lim Seng Huat

== See also ==
- Belsonic
- Belson Stadium
- Bergen-Belsen concentration camp
