= Monarchism in the United States =

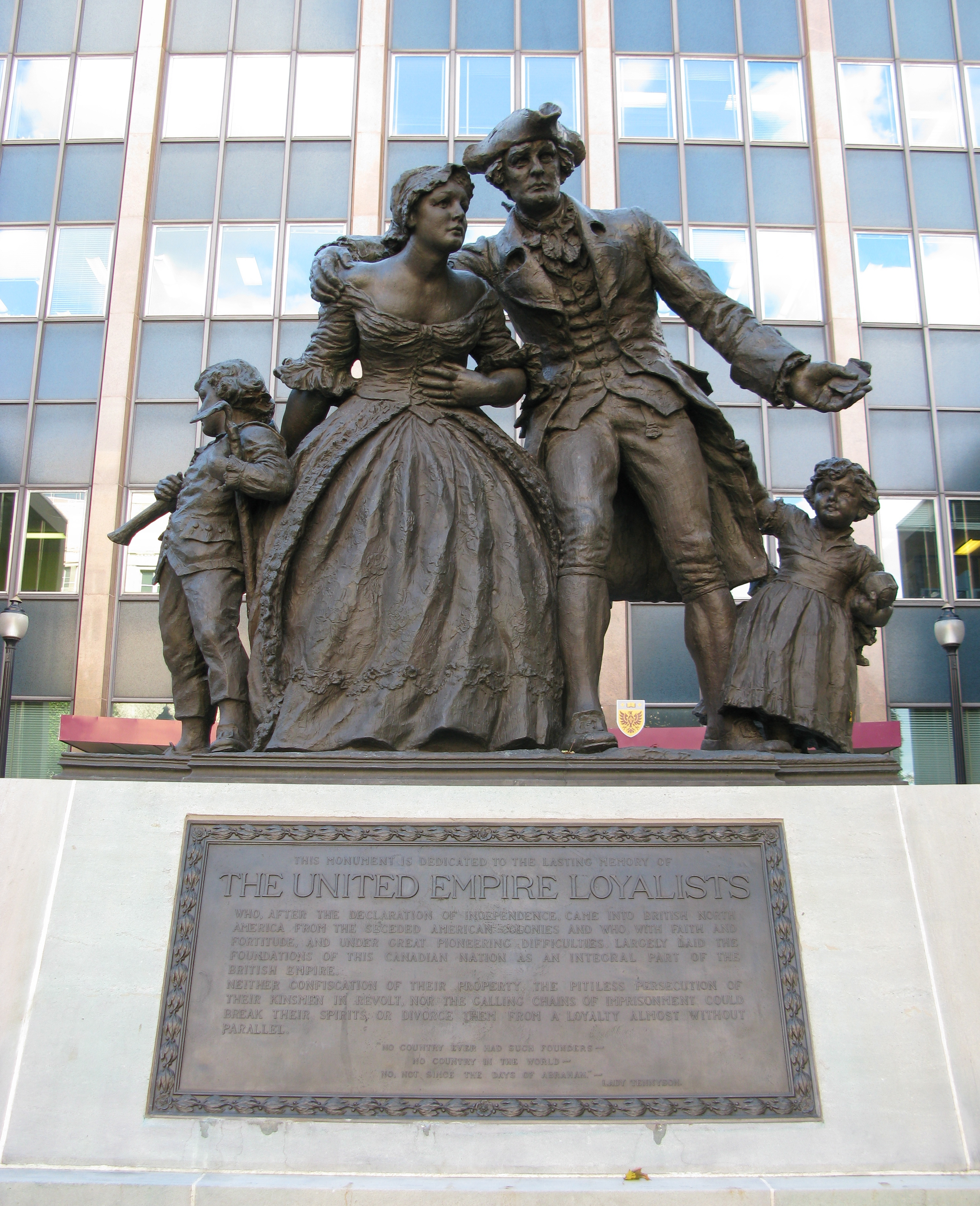
A monument in Canada to United Empire Loyalists, American monarchists that resettled after the American Revolution

During the American Revolution, a significant element of the population of the Thirteen Colonies remained loyal to the British crown. However, since then, aside from a few considerations in the 1780s, there has not been any serious movement supporting monarchy in the United States, whether foreign or native, although a small number of prominent individuals have, from time to time, advocated the concept.

== Revolutionary period ==
During the American Revolution, those American colonists who stayed loyal to the British crown were termed "Loyalists". Historians have estimated that in 1775, of the 2,000,000 colonists, between 15% and 20% were Loyalists. American Loyalists that resettled in British North America (modern Canada and Bermuda) would be given the title of "United Empire Loyalist".

The revolutionary war officially ended in 1783 with the signing of the Treaty of Paris. This marked the official end of monarchy in the American states with George III of the United Kingdom being the last monarch.

== Confederation period ==
In the 1780s, in the period between the American Revolution and the ratification of the United States Constitution, several propositions for creating an independent monarchy were considered.

=== George Washington ===
On May 22, 1782, the Newburgh letter was sent to George Washington, who was, at the time, camped at Newburgh, New York. Written for the Continental Army officers by Colonel Lewis Nicola, it proposed that Washington should become the King of the United States. Washington reacted very strongly against the suggestion, and was greatly troubled by it, turning it down in favor of a republican government. (Note: There are multiple disagreements on who would have been the "king of the United States" today if George Washington had become king and passed the crown to his descendants. The general consensus among historians and genealogists would give the title to Richard Washington of Texas.)

=== Prussian Scheme ===
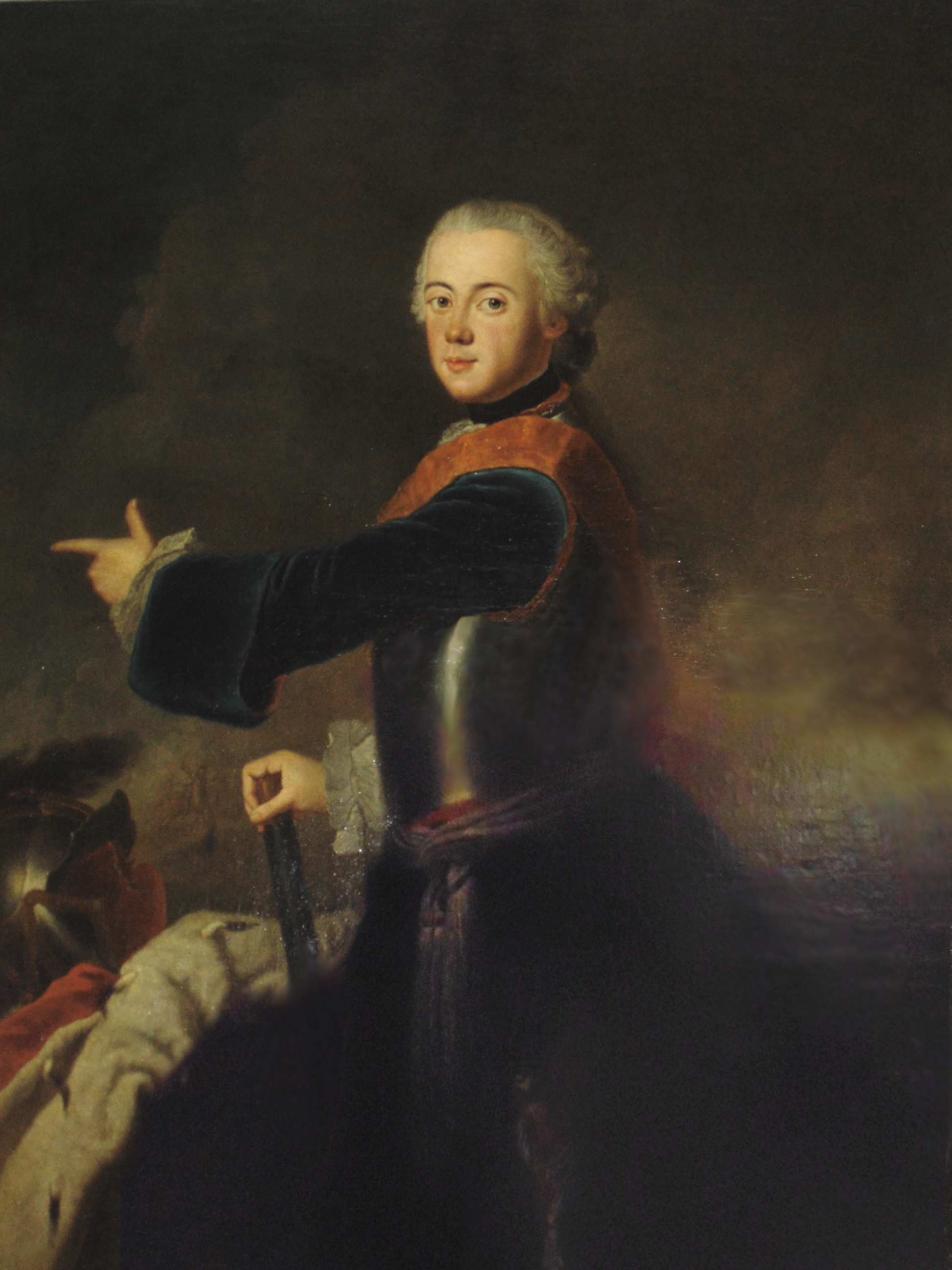
Prince Henry of Prussia

In 1786, the President of the Continental Congress, Nathaniel Gorham, acting in possible concert with other persons influential in the government of the United States, is reported to have offered the crown to Henry of Prussia, a prince of the House of Hohenzollern and younger brother of Frederick the Great, possibly with the aim of resolving the ongoing political crises occurring during the last days of the Articles of Confederation. According to Rufus King, Gorham secretly corresponded with Prince Henry of Prussia for this purpose. The attempt may have died due to a lack of interest on Henry's part, popular opposition to a rumored proposal involving a different potential monarch, the convening of the Philadelphia Convention, or some combination thereof.

=== Constitutional Convention of 1787 ===
Alexander Hamilton argued in a long speech before the Constitutional Convention of 1787 that the President of the United States should be an elective monarch, ruling for "good behavior" (i.e., for life, unless impeached) and with extensive powers. Hamilton believed that elective monarchs had sufficient power domestically to resist foreign corruption, yet there was enough domestic control over their behavior to prevent tyranny at home. Hamilton argued, "And let me observe that an executive is less dangerous to the liberties of the people when in office during life than for seven years. It may be said this constitutes as an elective monarchy... But by making the executive subject to impeachment, the term 'monarchy' cannot apply..." His proposal was resoundingly voted down in favor of a four-year term with the possibility of reelection.

In his later defense of the Constitution in The Federalist Papers, he often hints that a lifetime executive might be better, even as he praises the system with the four-year term. Political scientist Erik von Kuehnelt-Leddihn wrote that Hamilton "regretted that the United States could not become a monarchy."

== Modern monarchism ==
Since the ratification of the constitution, support for monarchy has possessed a generally low popularity, though it has increased slightly over time. In 1950, 3% of Americans said it would be a good idea for America to possess a royal family, while 93% thought it would be bad. This question was re-asked in 1999, where 11% of Americans answered that in favor of a royal family would be good for the United States and 87% against. A 2013 CNN poll found that 13% of Americans would be open to the United States possessing a royal family again. A 2018 poll asking if America would be better or worse if it possessed a constitutional monarchy had 11% of Americans answering better and 36% answering worse. A 2021 poll by YouGov found that 5% of Americans would consider it a good thing for the United States to have a monarchy (7% support among men and 4% support among women), with 69% answering that it would be a bad thing. In the YouGov poll, African Americans were most likely to answer positively in favor of a monarchy at 10% support. In 2023 another poll was conducted which found 12% of Americans favored monarchy in the United States while 63% remained opposed.

The Constantian Society, founded in 1970 by Randall J. Dicks, was a political group devoted to promoting the system of constitutional monarchy as a superior form of government, though its activities ceased with its founder's death in 1999.

The Monarchists of America is a political group that is devoted to promoting monarchism in the United States.

Some notable American monarchists include:

- Michael Auslin (Writer, historian, and policy analyst)
- Charles A. Coulombe (Writer and historian)
- Ralph Adams Cram (Architect and writer)
- Solange Hertz (Writer)
- Robert Jordan (Writer)
- William S. Lind (Political advisor and writer)
- Thomas Mace-Archer-Mills (Commentator)
- Joshua Norton (Trader, real estate speculator, and self-proclaimed Emperor of the United States) (Note: In 1859, Joshua Abraham Norton, a resident of San Francisco, California declared himself "Norton I., Emperor of the United States". He possessed no formal power during his self-declared reign, but citizens of San Francisco celebrated his presence and imperial proclamations regardless. He was never recognized as a valid monarch by the United States government, but King Kamehameha V of Hawaiʻi chose to officially recognize Norton as the valid leader of the United States.)
- Leland B. Yeager (Economist)
