= Monarchism =

Advocacy of a monarch or monarchical rule

Absolute monarchies Semi-constitutional monarchies Parliamentary monarchies Commonwealth realms (parliamentary monarchies in personal union) Subnational monarchies

Monarchism is the advocacy of the system of monarchy or monarchical rule. A monarchist is an individual who supports this form of government independently of any specific monarch, whereas one who supports a particular monarch is a royalist. Conversely, the opposition to monarchical rule is referred to as republicanism.

== History ==
Monarchical rule is among the oldest political institutions. The similar form of societal hierarchy known as chiefdom or tribal kingship is prehistoric. Chiefdoms provided the concept of state formation, which started with civilizations such as Mesopotamia, Ancient Egypt and the Indus Valley civilization. In some parts of the world, chiefdoms became monarchies.

In the 17th and 18th centuries, the Enlightenment began. This resulted in new anti-monarchist ideas which resulted in several revolutions such as the 18th century American Revolution and the French Revolution which were both additional steps in the weakening of power of European monarchies.

=== Africa ===
==== Central Africa ====
and Central African Empire

==== Ethiopia ====
In 1974, one of the world's oldest monarchies was abolished in Ethiopia with the fall of Emperor Haile Selassie.

=== Asia ===
==== China ====
For most of its history, China was organized into various dynastic states under the rule of hereditary monarchs. Beginning with the establishment of dynastic rule by Yu the Great c. 2070 BC, and ending with the abdication of the Xuantong Emperor in AD 1912, Chinese historiography came to organize itself around the succession of monarchical dynasties. (Note: While the Xia dynasty is typically considered to be the first orthodox Chinese dynasty, numerous sources including the Book of Documents mention two other dynasties that preceded the Xia: the "Tang" (唐) and the "Yu" (虞) dynasties. The former is sometimes called the "Ancient Tang" (古唐) to distinguish it from other dynasties named "Tang". Should the historicity of these earlier dynasties be attested, Yu the Great would not have been the initiator of dynastic rule in China.) (Note: All attempts at restoring monarchical and dynastic rule in China following the Xinhai Revolution ended in failure. Hence, the abdication of the Xuantong Emperor in AD 1912 is typically regarded as the formal end of the Chinese monarchy.) Besides those established by the dominant Han ethnic group or its spiritual Huaxia predecessors, dynasties throughout Chinese history were also founded by non-Han peoples.

==== Japan ====
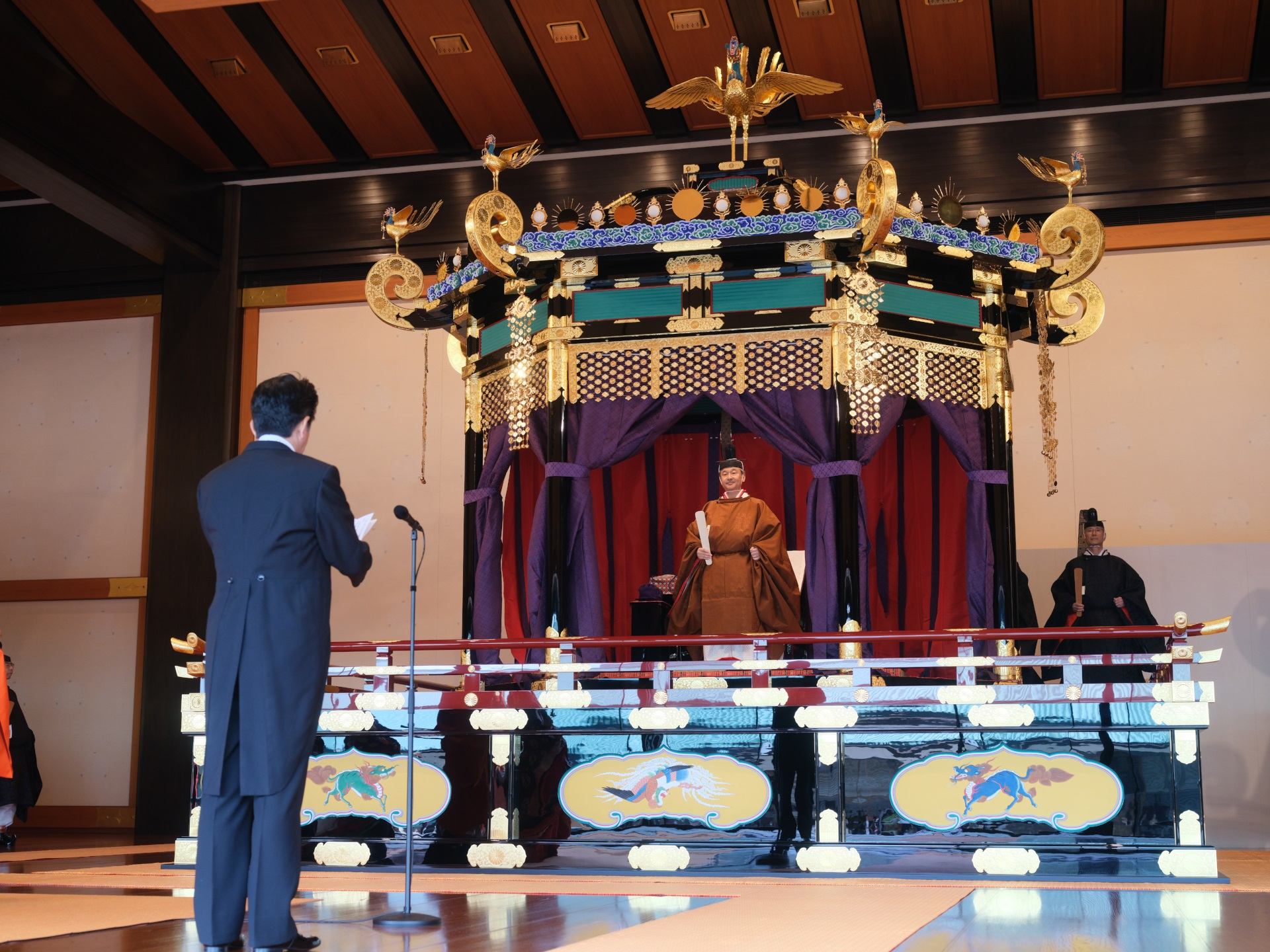
Enthronement ceremony of Emperor Naruhito in 2019

The Emperor of Japan or Tennō (天皇; pronounced [tennoꜜː]), literally "ruler from heaven" or "heavenly sovereign", (Note: In English, the use of the term Mikado (帝／御門) for the Emperor was once common but is now considered obsolete.) is the hereditary monarch and head of state of Japan. The Imperial Household Law governs the line of imperial succession. The emperor is personally immune from prosecution and is also recognized as the head of the Shinto religion, which holds the Emperor to be the direct descendant of the sun goddess Amaterasu. According to tradition, the office of Emperor was created in the 7th century BC, but modern scholars believe that the first Emperors did not appear until the 5th or 6th centuries AD. During the Kamakura period, from 1185 to 1333, the shōguns were the de facto rulers of Japan, with the emperor and the imperial court acting largely as figureheads. During the subsequent Muromachi and Edo periods, the shōguns remained the de facto rulers, while the Emperors exercised little real power. In 1867, shogun Tokugawa Yoshinobu stepped down, restoring Emperor Meiji to power. The Meiji Constitution was adopted In 1889, after which the Emperor became an active ruler with considerable political power that was shared with the Imperial Diet, although the Emperors exercised less power during the later Taishō and Shōwa periods. After World War II, the 1947 Constitution of Japan was enacted, defining the Emperor as the symbol of the Japanese state and the unity of the Japanese people. The Emperor has exercised a purely ceremonial role ever since.

=== Europe ===
==== Austria-Hungary ====
Following the collapse of Austria-Hungary, the Republic of German-Austria was proclaimed. The Constitutional Assembly of German Austria passed the Habsburg Law, which permanently exiled the Habsburg family from Austria. Despite this, significant support for the Habsburg family persisted in Austria. Following the Anschluss of 1938, the Nazi government suppressed monarchist activities. By the time Nazi rule ended in Austria, support for monarchism had largely evaporated.

==== France ====
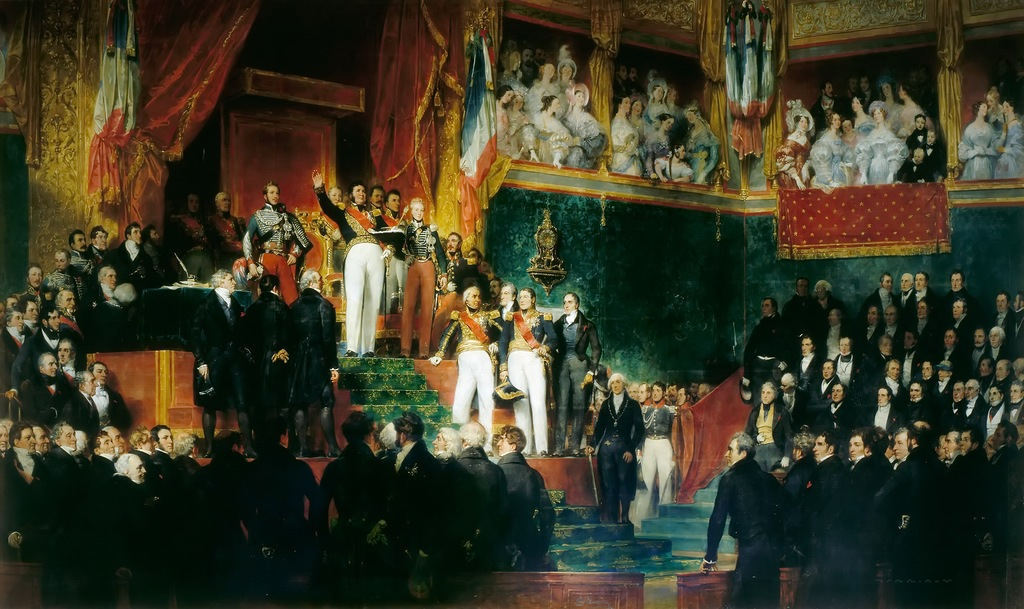
Louis Philippe I being sworn in as King

France was ruled by monarchs from the establishment of the Kingdom of West Francia in 843 until the end of the Second French Empire in 1870, with several interruptions.

Classical French historiography usually regards Clovis I, King of the Franks (r. 507–511), as the first king of France. However, historians today consider that such a kingdom did not begin until the establishment of West Francia, during the dissolution of the Carolingian Empire in the 800s.

==== Germany ====
In 1920s Germany, a number of monarchists gathered around the German National People's Party (founded in 1918), which demanded the return of the Hohenzollern monarchy and an end to the Weimar Republic; the party retained a large base of support until the rise of Nazism in the 1930s, as Adolf Hitler staunchly opposed monarchism.

==== Italy ====
The aftermath of World War II saw the return of monarchist and republican rivalry in Italy, where a referendum was held on whether the state should remain a monarchy or become a republic. The republican side won the vote by a narrow margin, and the modern Italian Republic was created.

==== Sweden ====
In Sweden during the so-called Age of Liberty (1719–1772), the actual exercise of power by Swedish monarchs was severely limited and restricted to chairing the sixteen-member Privy Council of Sweden (riksrådet), where the King had two votes and the casting vote in the event of a tie. The King could not dismiss the councillors, and they could easily outvote him. However, in addition to his constitutional role, the King continued to play a strong symbolic role as the official representative of the state and as the formal guarantor of the independence of the government.

==== Spain ====
After the 1931 Spanish local elections, King Alfonso XIII voluntarily left Spain and republicans proclaimed a Second Spanish Republic. After the assassination of opposition leader José Calvo Sotelo in 1936, right-wing forces banded together to overthrow the Republic. During the Spanish Civil War of 1936 to 1939, General Francisco Franco established the basis for the Spanish State (1939–1975). In 1938, the autocratic government of Franco claimed to have reconstituted the Spanish monarchy in absentia (and in this case ultimately yielded to a restoration, in the person of King Juan Carlos in late 1975).

In 1975, Juan Carlos I became King of Spain and began the Spanish transition to democracy. He abdicated in 2014, and was succeeded by his son Felipe VI.

==== United Kingdom ====
In England, royalty ceded power to other groups in a gradual process. In 1215, a group of nobles forced King John to sign the Magna Carta, which guaranteed the English barons certain liberties and established that the King's powers were not absolute. King Charles I was executed in 1649, and the Commonwealth of England was established as a republic. Highly unpopular, the republic was ended in 1660, and the monarchy was restored under King Charles II. In 1687–88, the Glorious Revolution and the overthrow of King James II established the principles of constitutional monarchy, which would later be worked out by Locke and other thinkers. However, absolute monarchy, justified by Hobbes in Leviathan (1651), remained a prominent principle elsewhere.

Following the Glorious Revolution, King William III and Queen Mary II were established as joint constitutional monarchs, with less power than their predecessor James II. Since then, royal power has become more ceremonial, with powers such as refusal to assent last exercised in 1708 by Queen Anne. Once part of the United Kingdom (1801–1922), southern Ireland eventually rejected monarchy and became the Republic of Ireland in 1949. Support for a ceremonial monarchy remains high in Britain. Queen Elizabeth II (r. 1952–2022), possessed wide support from the U.K.'s population. The current monarch of Britain is: Charles III. He assumed the throne on September 8th 2022, with the coronation on May 6th 2023.

=== North America ===
==== Costa Rica ====
The struggle between monarchists and republicans led to the Costa Rican civil war of 1823. Costa Rican monarchists include Joaquín de Oreamuno y Muñoz de la Trinidad, José Santos Lombardo y Alvarado, and Rafael Gallegos Alvarado. in 1822, Costa Rican monarchists were loyal to Emperor Agustín de Iturbide of the First Mexican Empire.

==== Honduras ====
Old colonial coat of arms of Honduras with monarchical elements

After the independence of the general captaincy of Guatemala from the Spanish empire, Honduras joined the First Mexican Empire for a brief period. These were divided between the annexationists, made up mostly of illustrious Spanish-descendant families and members of the conservative party who supported the idea of being part of an empire, and the liberals who wanted Central America to be a separate nation under a republican system.

==== Mexico ====
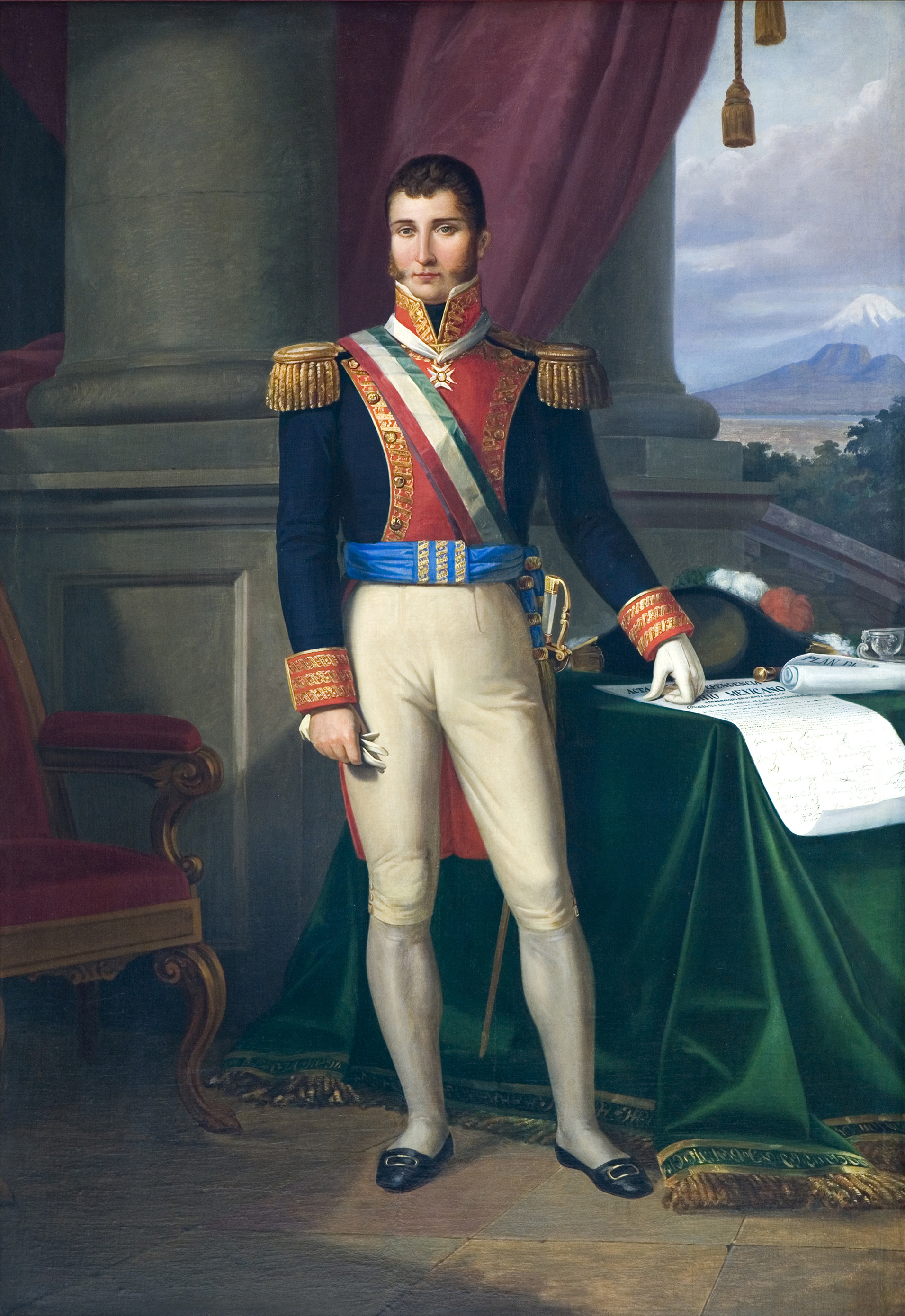
Emperor Agustín de Iturbide of México

After obtaining independence from Spain, the First Mexican Empire was established under Emperor Agustín I. His reign lasted less than one year, and he was forcefully deposed. In 1864, the Second Mexican Empire was formed under Emperor Maximilian I. Maximilian's government enjoyed French aid, but opposition from America, and collapsed after three years. Much like Agustín I, Maximilian I was deposed and later executed by his republican enemies. Since 1867, Mexico has not possessed a monarchy.

Today, some Mexican monarchist organizations advocate for Maximilian von Götzen-Iturbide or Carlos Felipe de Habsburgo to be instated as the Emperor of Mexico.

==== Nicaragua ====
The miskito ethnic group inhabits part of the Atlantic coast of Honduras and Nicaragua, by the beginning of the 17th century the said ethnic group was reorganized under a single chief known as Ta Uplika, for the reign of his grandson King Oldman I this group had a very close relationship With the English, they managed to turn the Mosquitia coast into an English protectorate that would decline in the 19th century until it completely disappeared in 1894 with the abdication of Robert II.

Currently, the Miskitos who are shot between the two countries have denounced the neglect of their communities and abuses committed by the authorities. As a result of this, in Nicaragua, several Miskito people began a movement of separatism from present-day Nicaragua and a re-institution of the monarchy.

==== United States ====
After the U.S. declared its independence, the form of government by which it would operate still remained unsettled. At least two of America's Founding Fathers, Alexander Hamilton and Nathaniel Gorham, believed that America should be an independent monarchy. Various proposals to create an American monarchy were considered, including the Prussian scheme which would have made Prince Henry of Prussia king of the United States. Hamilton proposed that the leader of America should be an elected monarch, while Gorham pushed for a hereditary monarchy. U.S. military officer Lewis Nicola also desired for America to be a monarchy, suggesting George Washington accept the crown of America, which he declined. All attempts ultimately failed, and America was founded as a federal republic.

Since the ratification of the constitution, support for monarchy has possessed a generally low popularity, though it has increased slightly over time. In 1950, 3% of Americans said it would be a good idea for America to possess a royal family, while 93% thought it would be bad. This question was re-asked in 1999, where 11% of Americans answered that in favor of a royal family would be good for the United States and 87% against. A 2013 CNN poll found that 13% of Americans would be open to the United States possessing a royal family again. A 2018 poll asking if America would be better or worse if it possessed a constitutional monarchy had 11% of Americans answering better and 36% answering worse. A 2021 poll by YouGov found that 5% of Americans would consider it a good thing for the United States to have a monarchy (7% support among men and 4% support among women), with 69% answering that it would be a bad thing. In the YouGov poll, African Americans were most likely to answer positively in favor of a monarchy at 10% support. In 2023 another poll was conducted which found 12% of Americans favored monarchy in the United States while 63% remained opposed.

=== Argentina ===
The Carlotist Plan (Carlotism) was a proposal by Manuel Belgrano for the United Provinces of the South (today Argentina) to be governed through a constitutional monarchy under the throne of Charlota Joaquina de Bourbon, of noble European origin. The plan was discussed extensively, had various supports and there was a strong flow in terms of correspondence to be able to carry out the project, but it was finally rejected since the delay in the agreement created disinterest in the Noble Candidate, who would finally abandon the project. According to some historians, Argentine historical figures such as Mariano Moreno, Bernardino Rivadavia, Juan Bautista Alberdi and José de San Martín were strongly monarchical figures.

The Argentine Monarchical Movement (MMA) is the most well-known and influential movement in this country. He maintains great ties with Brazilian movements such as the Rio de Janeiro Monarchist Circle or the CONFEMBRAS, coming to meet with members of the royal house of Brazil. The objective of this movement is to establish a parliamentary constitutional monarchy, which through the separation of the Government (political) and the state (king/queen) creates a true independence of the powers.

==== Brazil ====
From gaining its independence in 1822 until 1889, Brazil was governed as a constitutional monarchy with a branch of the Portuguese Royal Family serving as monarchs. Prior to this period, Brazil had been a royal colony which had also served briefly as the seat of government for the Portuguese Empire following the occupation of that country by Napoleon Bonaparte in 1808. The history of the Empire of Brazil was marked by brief periods of political instability, several wars that Brazil won, and a marked increase in immigration which saw the arrival of both Jews and Protestants who were attracted by Brazil's reputation for religious tolerance. The final decades of the Empire under the reign of Pedro II saw a remarkable period of relative peace both at home and internationally, coupled with dramatic economic expansion, the extension of basic civil rights to most people and the gradual restriction of slavery, culminating in its final abolition in 1888. It is also remembered for its thriving culture and arts. However, Pedro II had little interest in preserving the monarchy and passively accepted its overthrow by a military coup d'état in 1889 resulting in the establishment of a dictatorship known as the First Brazilian Republic.

== Current monarchies ==
The majority of current monarchies are constitutional monarchies. In a constitutional monarchy the power of the monarch is restricted by either a written or unwritten constitution, this should not be confused with a ceremonial monarchy, in which the monarch holds only symbolic power and plays very little to no part in government or politics. In some constitutional monarchies the monarch does play a more active role in political affairs than in others. In Thailand, for instance, King Bhumibol Adulyadej, who reigned from 1946 to 2016, played a critical role in the nation's political agenda and in various military coups. Similarly, in Morocco, King Mohammed VI wields significant, but not absolute power.

Liechtenstein is a democratic principality whose citizens have voluntarily given more power to their monarch in recent years.

There remain a handful of countries in which the monarchy is an absolute monarchy. The majority of these countries are oil-producing Arab Islamic monarchies like Saudi Arabia, Bahrain, Qatar, Oman, and the United Arab Emirates. Other strong monarchies include Brunei and Eswatini.

Country	Sovereign
Andorra	Co-Prince Emmanuel Macron
Andorra	Co-Prince Josep-Lluís Serrano Pentinat
Antigua and Barbuda	King Charles III
Australia	King Charles III
Bahamas	King Charles III
Belize	King Charles III
Canada	King Charles III
Grenada	King Charles III
Jamaica	King Charles III
New Zealand	King Charles III
Papua New Guinea	King Charles III
Saint Kitts and Nevis	King Charles III
Saint Lucia	King Charles III
Saint Vincent and the Grenadines	King Charles III
Solomon Islands	King Charles III
Tuvalu	King Charles III
United Kingdom	King Charles III
Bahrain	King Hamad bin Isa
Belgium	King Philippe
Bhutan	King Jigme Khesar Namgyel
Brunei	Sultan Hassanal Bolkiah
Cambodia	King Norodom Sihamoni
Denmark	King Frederik X
Eswatini	King Mswati III
Japan	Emperor Naruhito
Jordan	King Abdullah II
Kuwait	Emir Mishal Al-Ahmad
Lesotho	King Letsie III
Liechtenstein	Prince Hans-Adam II
Luxembourg	Grand Duke Guillaume V
Malaysia	Sultan Ibrahim
Monaco	Sovereign Prince Albert II
Morocco	King Mohammed VI
Kingdom of the Netherlands	King Willem-Alexander
Norway	Haakon VIII
Oman	Sultan Haitham bin Tariq
Qatar	Emir Tamim bin Hamad Al Thani
Saudi Arabia	King Salman
Spain	King Felipe VI
Sweden	King Carl XVI Gustaf
Thailand	King Vajiralongkorn
Tonga	King Tupou VI
United Arab Emirates	Sheikh Mohamed bin Zayed Al Nahyan
Vatican City	Pope Leo XIV

== Political philosophy ==
Otto von Habsburg advocated a form of constitutional monarchy based on the primacy of the supreme judicial function, with hereditary succession, mediation by a tribunal is warranted if suitability is problematic.

=== Non-partisanship ===
British political scientist Vernon Bogdanor justifies monarchy on the grounds that it provides for a nonpartisan head of state, separate from the head of government, and thus ensures that the highest representative of the country, at home and internationally, does not represent a particular political party, but all people. Bogdanor also notes that monarchies can play a helpful unifying role in a multinational state, noting that "In Belgium, it is sometimes said that the King is the only Belgian, everyone else being either Fleming or Walloon" and that the British sovereign can belong to all of the United Kingdom's constituent countries (England, Scotland, Wales, and Northern Ireland), without belonging to any particular one of them.

=== Private interest ===
Thomas Hobbes wrote that the private interest of the monarchy is the same with the public. The riches, power, and humour of a monarch arise only from the riches, strength, and reputation of his subjects. An elected Head of State is incentivised to increase his own wealth for leaving office after a few years whereas a monarch has no reason to corrupt because he would be cheating himself. (Note: Leviathan, 19.4, pp.124-5)

=== Wise counsel ===
Thomas Hobbes wrote that a monarch can receive wise counsel with secrecy while an assembly cannot. Advisors to the assembly tend to be well-versed more in the acquisition of their own wealth than of knowledge; are likely to give their advices in long discourses which often excite men into action but do not govern them in it, moved by the flame of passion instead of enlightenment. Their multitude is a weakness. (Note: Leviathan, 19.5, p.125)

=== Long termism ===
Thomas Hobbes wrote that the resolutions of a monarch are subject to no inconsistency save for human nature; in assemblies, inconsistencies arise from the number. For in an assembly, as little as the absence of a few or the diligent appearance of a few of the contrary opinion, "undoes today all that was done yesterday". (Note: Leviathan, 19.6, p.125)

=== Civil war reduction ===
Thomas Hobbes wrote that a monarch cannot disagree with himself, out of envy or interest, but an assembly may and to such a height that may produce a civil war. (Note: Leviathan, 19.7, p.125)

=== Liberty ===
The International Monarchist League, founded in 1943, has always sought to promote monarchy on the grounds that it strengthens popular liberty, both in a democracy and in a dictatorship, because by definition the monarch is not beholden to politicians.

British-American libertarian writer Matthew Feeney argues that European constitutional monarchies "have managed for the most part to avoid extreme politics"—specifically fascism, communism, and military dictatorship—"in part because monarchies provide a check on the wills of populist politicians" by representing entrenched customs and traditions. Feeney notes that

European monarchies—such as the Danish, Belgian, Swedish, Dutch, Norwegian, and British—have ruled over countries that are among the most stable, prosperous, and free in the world.

Socialist writer George Orwell argued a similar point, that constitutional monarchy is effective at preventing the development of fascism.

"The function of the King in promoting stability and acting as a sort of keystone in a non-democratic society is, of course, obvious. But he also has, or can have, the function of acting as an escape-valve for dangerous emotions. A French journalist said to me once that the monarchy was one of the things that have saved Britain from Fascism...It is at any rate possible that while this division of function exists a Hitler or a Stalin cannot come to power. On the whole the European countries which have most successfully avoided Fascism have been constitutional monarchies... I have often advocated that a Labour government, i.e. one that meant business, would abolish titles while retaining the Royal Family.’

Erik von Kuehnelt-Leddihn took a different approach, arguing that liberty and equality are contradictions. As such, he argued that attempts to establish greater social equality through the abolishment of monarchy, ultimately results in a greater loss of liberty for citizens. He believed that equality can only be accomplished through the suppression of liberty, as humans are naturally unequal and hierarchical. Kuehnelt-Leddihn also believed that people are on average freer under monarchies than they are under democratic republics, as the latter tends to more easily become tyrannical through ochlocracy. In Liberty or Equality, he writes:

There is little doubt that the American Congress or the French Chambers have a power over their nations which would rouse the envy of a Louis XIV or a George III, were they alive today. Not only prohibition, but also the income tax declaration, selective service, obligatory schooling, the fingerprinting of blameless citizens, premarital blood tests—none of these totalitarian measures would even the royal absolutism of the seventeenth century have dared to introduce.

Hans-Hermann Hoppe also argues that monarchy helps to preserve individual liberty more effectively than democracy.

=== Natural desire for hierarchy ===
In a 1943 essay in The Spectator, "Equality", British author C.S. Lewis criticized egalitarianism, and its corresponding call for the abolition of monarchy, as contrary to human nature, writing,

A man's reaction to Monarchy is a kind of test. Monarchy can easily be 'debunked'; but watch the faces, mark well the accents, of the debunkers. These are the men whose tap-root in Eden has been cut: whom no rumour of the polyphony, the dance, can reach—men to whom pebbles laid in a row are more beautiful than an arch...Where men are forbidden to honour a king they honour millionaires, athletes, or film-stars instead: even famous prostitutes or gangsters. For spiritual nature, like bodily nature, will be served; deny it food and it will gobble poison.

=== Political accountability ===
Oxford political scientists Petra Schleiter and Edward Morgan-Jones wrote that in monarchies, it is more common to hold elections than non-electoral replacements.

=== Notable works ===
Notable works arguing in favour of monarchy include

- Abbott, Tony (1995). The Minimal Monarchy: And Why It Still Makes Sense For Australia
- Alighieri, Dante (c. 1312). De Monarchia
- Aquinas, Thomas (1267). De Regno, to the King of Cyprus
- Auslin, Michael (2014). America Needs a King
- Balmes, Jaime (1850). European Civilization: Protestantism and Catholicity Compared in their Effects on the Civilization of Europe (Note: Chapters LVIII-LXIV)
- Bellarmine, Robert (1588). De Romano Pontifice, On the Roman Pontiff
- Bodin, Jean (1576). The Six Books of the Republic
- Bogdanor, Vernon (1997). The Monarchy and the Constitution
- Bossuet, Jacques-Bénigne (1709). Politics Drawn from the Very Words of Holy Scripture
- Charles I of England (1649). Eikon Basilike
- Coulombe, Charles A. (2016). Star-Spangled Crown: A Simple Guide to the American Monarchy
- Chateaubriand, François-René de (1814). Of Buonaparte, and the Bourbons, and of the Necessity of Rallying Round Our Legitimate Princes
- Cram, Ralph Adams (1936). Invitation to Monarchy
- Filmer, Robert (1680). Patriarcha
- Hobbes, Thomas (1651). Leviathan
- Hermann-Hoppe, Hans (2001). Democracy: The God That Failed
- — (2014). From Aristocracy to Monarchy to Democracy: A Tale of Moral and Economic Folly and Decay
- James VI and I (1598). The True Law of Free Monarchies
- — (1599). Basilikon Doron
- Jean, Count of Paris (2009). Un Prince Français
- Kuehnelt-Leddihn, Erik von (1952). Liberty or Equality: The Challenge of Our Times
- — (2000). Monarchy and War
- Maistre, Joseph de (1797). Considerations on France
- Pius VI (1793). Pourquoi Notre Voix
- Scruton, Roger (1991). A Focus of Loyalty Higher Than the State
- Ségur, Louis Gaston Adrien de (1871). Vive le Roi!
- Vegas Latapiè, Eugenio (1983). Memorias politicas. El suicidio de la monarquia y la Segunda Republica
- Whittle, Peter (2011). Monarchy Matters

== Support for monarchy ==
=== Current monarchies ===
Country	Polling firm/source	Sample size	Percentage of supporters	Date conducted	Ref.
Antigua and Barbuda	Lord Ashcroft Polls	510	45%	February and March 2023	
Australia	Essential	1,125	48%	April 2023	
Bahamas	Lord Ashcroft Polls	507	27%	February and March 2023	
Belgium	IVOX	1,000	58%	September 2017	
Belize	Lord Ashcroft Polls	510	48%	February and March 2023	
Canada	Nanos Research	1,001	48%	June 2022	
Denmark	Gallup		86%	2014	
Grenada	Lord Ashcroft Polls	510	56%	February and March 2023	
Jamaica	Lord Ashcroft Polls	510	40%	February and March 2023	
Japan	Mainichi Shimbun		74%	April 2019	
Lesotho	Afrobarometer		75%	June 2018	
Morocco	Le Monde	1,108	91%	March 2009	
Netherlands	EenVandaag		59%	2025	
New Zealand	Lord Ashcroft Polls	2,012	44%	February and March 2023	
Norway	Response Analyse	1,003	78%	September 2026	
Papua New Guinea	Lord Ashcroft Polls	510	51%	February and March 2023	
Saint Kitts and Nevis	Lord Ashcroft Polls	510	52%	February and March 2023	
Saint Lucia	Lord Ashcroft Polls	510	56%	February and March 2023	
Saint Vincent and the Grenadines	Lord Ashcroft Polls	510	63%	February and March 2023	
Solomon Islands	Lord Ashcroft Polls	310	34%	February and March 2023	
Spain	Spain		58.6%	January 2024	
Sweden	Novus		73%	January 2023	
Thailand	Suan Dusit Rajabhat University	5,700	75%	October 2020	
Tuvalu	Lord Ashcroft Polls	310	71%	February and March 2023	
United Kingdom	Ipsos	2,166	81%	May 2024	

=== Former monarchies and republics ===
The following is a list of former monarchies and their percentage of public support for monarchism.

Country	Claimant and recent royal houses	Polling firm/source	Sample size	Percentage of supporters	Date conducted	Ref.
Austria	Habsburg-Lorraine	Market-Instituts/Der Standard	800	10%	January 2025	
Barbados	Windsor	University of the West Indies	500	12%	November 2021	
Brazil	Orléans-Braganza	Círculo Monárquico Brasileiro	188	32%	September 2019	
Croatia	Habsburg-Lorraine (Note: as part of Austria-Hungary)	Consilium Regium Croaticum	1,759	41%	2019	
Czechia	Habsburg-Lorraine	MEDIAN.EU	1,015	10%	August 2021	
Ethiopia	Solomonic	Ethiopia Insight		28%	2020	
France	Bourbon/Orléans/Bonaparte	Politês	1,844	13%	October 2025	
Georgia	Bagrationi	Doctrina	560	30% (approx.)	July 2015	
Germany	Hohenzollern	IamExpat	1,005	8%	2023	
Greece	Schleswig-Holstein-Sonderburg-Glücksburg	Metron Analysis	1,202	6%	April 2024	
Hong Kong (Note: Hong Kong is a special autonomous region of the People's Republic of China.)	Qing (Note: In their capacity as Emperor of China.)	University of New South Wales/ University of Sydney	~1,000	6.1%	January 2021	
Hungary	Habsburg-Lorraine	Azonnali	3,541	46%	May 2021	
India	Windsor	Ipsos	~700 (Note: The sample size consisted of 11,332 people across 17 countries. if distributed nearly equally across all countries, this would result in 600–700 approximately per country (including India).)	31% (Note: 31% think replacing their elected head of state with a monarchy like Britain’s would be better, and 29% worse whereas 40% were indifferent/unsure.)	May 2018	
Iran	Pahlavi	GAMAAN	31,450	34%	June 2026	
Italy	Savoy	Sky TG24		14.8%	May 2026	
Libya	Senussi	Pollfish		48%	September 2024	
Lithuania	Urach	Delfi	1,008	3%	June 2012	
Mexico	Iturbide/Habsburg-Lorraine	Parametría		7.6%	July 2014	
Nepal	Gorkha	Interdisciplinary Analysts	3,000	49%	January 2008	
Pakistan	Windsor	Gilani Research Foundation	2,640	17%	July 2013	
Poland	Wettin	SW Research	808	26.8% (Note: According to the survey, 26.8% supported the monarchy and 42.5% were against it. 30.7% were unsure on the matter.)	January 2026	
Portugal	Braganza-Coburg	Marktest Group	~1,000	19.7% (Note: 37% of people who responded to the survey claimed Portugal would be worse as a monarchy, 19.7% thought it would be better than the republic and 43.3% were indifferent to it.)	September 2010	
Romania	Romania	Cotidianul		35.4% (Note: 54.7% of Romanians say they would vote against the monarchy and for maintaining the republic (compared to 41% in July 2013). 35.4% say they would vote in favor of the monarchy (compared to 27.2% in July 2013), and 9.9% do not know or do not answer (compared to 31.8% in July 2013).)	December 2023	
Russia	Holstein-Gottorp-Romanov	Russian Public Opinion Research Center	~1,800	28% (Note: Among respondents, 22 per cent answered that they were not opposed to a monarchy in principle, but could not think of a person "worthy of the Russian throne", whereas 6 per cent believed there was.)	March 2017	
Serbia	Karađorđević	Blic	1,117	20%	2022	
South Korea	Yi	Naver News	1,000	40.4%	2010	
Syria	Hashemites	Al-Bukhari	2,100	36%	August 2025	
Turkey	Osman	Toplum Çalışmaları Enstitüsü	1,514	12.5%	September 2024	
United States	—N/a	YouGov	4,599	3%	April 2026	

=== Notable monarchists ===
Several notable public figures who advocated for monarchy or are monarchists include:

==== Arts and entertainment ====
- Honoré de Balzac, French novelist & playwright
- Fyodor Dostoevsky, Russian novelist & essayist
- Pedro Muñoz Seca, Spanish playwright
- George MacDonald, British theologian and writer
- C.S. Lewis, British theologian and writer
- J.R.R. Tolkien, British writer
- T.S. Eliot, American-British poet & writer
- Salvador Dalí, Spanish artist
- Hergé, Belgian cartoonist
- Éric Rohmer, French filmmaker
- Yukio Mishima, Japanese author
- Dame Joan Collins, English actress & author
- Sir Stephen Fry, English actor & author

==== Clergy ====
- Thomas Aquinas, Italian Catholic priest & theologian
- Robert Bellarmine, Italian Cardinal & theologian
- Jacques-Bénigne Bossuet, French Bishop & theologian
- Jules Mazarin, Italian Cardinal & minister
- André-Hercule de Fleury, French Cardinal & minister
- Pius VI, Italian Pope & ruler of the Papal States
- Fabrizio Ruffo, Italian Cardinal & treasurer
- Ercole Consalvi, Italian Cardinal Secretary of State
- Pelagio Antonio de Labastida y Dávalos, Mexican Archbishop & Regent of the Second Mexican Empire
- Louis Gaston Adrien de Ségur, French Bishop & writer
- Louis Billot, French priest & theologian
- Pius XII, Italian Pope & sovereign of Vatican City
- József Mindszenty, Hungarian Cardinal & Prince-primate

==== Philosophy ====
- Dante Alighieri, Italian poet & philosopher
- Jean Bodin, French political philosopher
- Robert Filmer, English political theorist
- Thomas Hobbes, English philosopher
- Joseph de Maistre, Savoyard philosopher & writer
- Juan Donoso Cortés, Spanish politician & political theologian
- Søren Kierkegaard, Danish philosopher & theologian
- Charles Maurras, French author & philosopher
- Kang Youwei, Chinese political thinker & reformer
- Ralph Adams Cram, American architect & writer
- Erik von Kuehnelt-Leddihn, Austrian political scientist & philosopher
- Vernon Bogdanor, British political scientist & historian
- Roger Scruton, English philosopher & writer
- Hans Hermann-Hoppe, German-American political theorist
- Charles A. Coulombe, American historian & author
- Plinio Corrêa de Oliveira, Brazilian philosopher and writer

==== Politics ====
- François-René de Chateaubriand, French historian & Ambassador
- Manuel Belgrano, Argentinian politician
- Klemens von Metternich, Austrian Chancellor
- Miguel Miramón, Mexican President & military general
- Otto von Bismarck, German Chancellor
- Juan Vázquez de Mella, Spanish politician & political theorist
- Panagis Tsaldaris, Greek Prime Minister
- Winston Churchill, British Prime Minister of the U.K.
- Călin Popescu-Tăriceanu, Romanian Prime Minister
- Salome Zourabichvili, Georgian President
- Tony Abbott, Australian Prime Minister
- Antônio Henrique Cunha Bueno, Brazilian politician

=== Monarchist movements and parties ===
- Action Française
- Alfonsism
- Alliance Royale
- Australian Monarchist League
- Australians for Constitutional Monarchy
- Bonapartism
- Black-Yellow Alliance
- Carlism
- Cavalier
- Chouannerie
- Conservative-Monarchist Club
- Constantian Society
- Constitutionalist Party of Iran
- Druk Phuensum Tshogpa
- Hawaiian sovereignty movement (Note: Some activists within the sovereignty movement advocate for a restoration of the Hawaiian monarchy, while others push for an independent Hawaiian republic.)
- Hovpartiet
- International Monarchist League
- Jacobitism
- Koruna Česká (party)
- Legality Movement
- Legitimism
- Liberal Democratic Party of Russia
- Loyalism
- Loyalist (American Revolution)
- Miguelist
- Monarchist League of Canada
- Monarchist Party of Russia
- Monarchy New Zealand
- Movement for the Restoration of the Kingdom of Serbia
- Nouvelle Action Royaliste
- Orléanism
- People's Alliance for Democracy
- Rastriya Prajatantra Party
- Royal Stuart Society
- Royalist Party
- Sanfedismo
- Serbian Renewal Movement
- Sonnō jōi
- Tradition und Leben
- Traditionalist Communion
- Ultra-royalist

== Criticism ==
Criticism of monarchy can be targeted against the general form of government—monarchy—or more specifically, to particular monarchical governments as controlled by hereditary royal families. For example, Montesquieu often criticized the French monarchy and its institutions, with the belief that they were forms of despotism. Monarchies in Europe and their underlying concepts, such as the Divine Right of Kings, were often criticized during the Age of Enlightenment, which notably paved the way to the French Revolution and the proclamation of the abolition of the monarchy in France. Earlier, the American Revolution had seen the Patriots suppress the Loyalists and expel all royal officials.

The twentieth century, beginning with the 1917 February Revolution in Russia and accelerated by two world wars, saw many European countries replace their monarchies with republics, while others replaced their absolute monarchies with constitutional monarchies.

== See also ==
- Dark Enlightenment
- List of dynasties
- Reactionary modernism
