= International Monarchist League =

Political organisation

The International Monarchist League (known until the mid-1990s as the Monarchist League) is an organization dedicated to the preservation and promotion of the monarchical system of government and the principle of monarchy worldwide. It has been active in advocating the restoration of the monarchy in countries that have become republics in the twentieth century, particularly since the Second World War. The League is based in the United Kingdom.

== Establishment ==
John Edward Bazille-Corbin (born Corbin, 1887–1964) founded The Monarchist League as a faux-chivalric body in 1943. Bazille-Corbin was a colourful character, who, according to Peter Anson, while retaining his living as Anglican rector of Runwell St Mary in Essex, also became titular Bishop of Selsey in Mar Georgius' "Catholicate of the West". An avid collector of titles and orders of a questionable nature, Bazille-Corbin used the titles of Duca di San Giaconio and Marquis de Beuvel.

The League eventually developed into a pressure and support group. Celebrating its Silver Jubilee in 1968, The Monarchist editorial said "in the late 50s and the early 60s a great resurgence took place in The League when negative and passive monarchism was turned into positive and aggressive monarchism."

The League is governed by a "Grand Council", which includes some non-British representatives. The Chancellor for at least a decade prior to 1975 was Lieut.-Col. J. C. du Parc Braham, TD (1920–1990). Du Parc Braham, an industrious but eccentric personality, kept The League's profile high. He was succeeded by the 6th Marquess of Bristol, who had been a member of The League's Grand Council previous to 1968. Lord Bristol subsidised The League and many of its events until his death in March 1985.

Michael Wynne-Parker had been Principal Secretary from the late 1970s, and following the Marquess of Bristol's death also became The League's Acting Chancellor until 1987 when Count Nikolai Tolstoy was appointed to that position. Wynne-Parker was then made a Vice-Chancellor, a post which he held until standing down in March 1990.

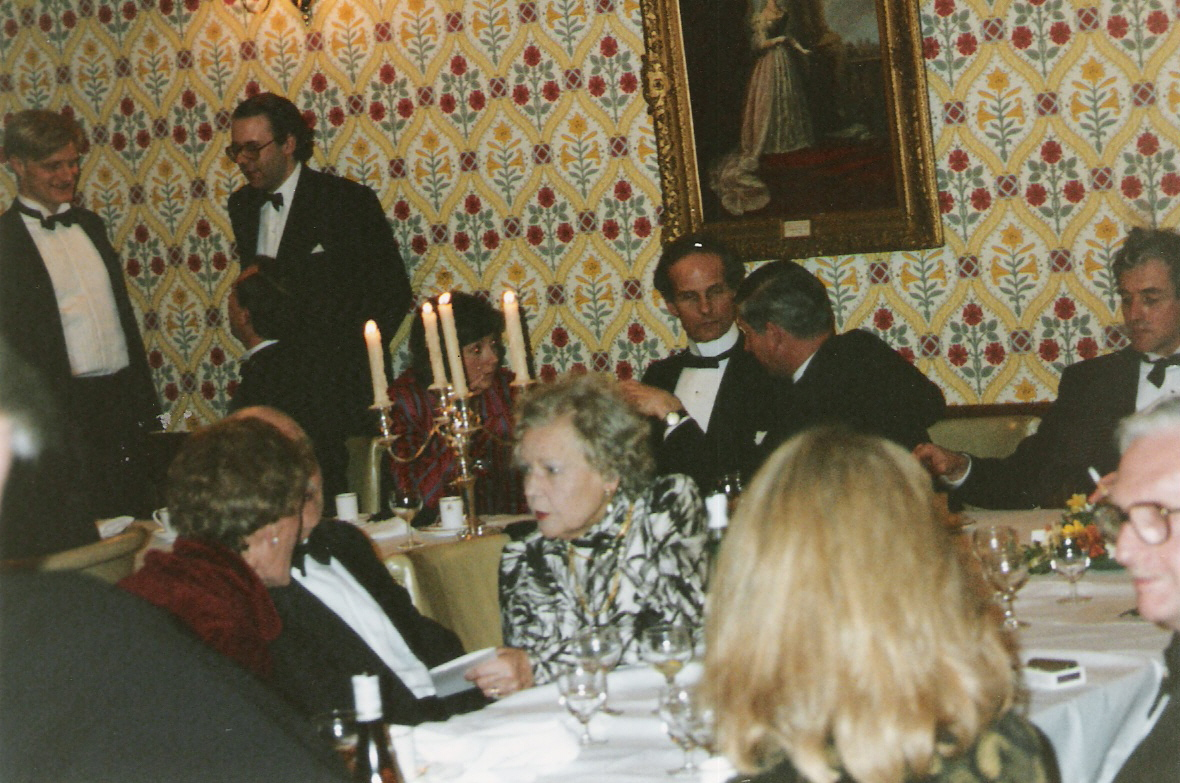
Left to right; Christoper Arkell & Lord Nicholas Hervey (standing) Gregory Lauder-Frost (speaking to Arkell), Countess Georgina Tolstoy, Count Nikolai Tolstoy (seated under picture), unknown man, Lord Sudeley and John P. Bullen Stean (with glasses) at a dinner on 12 March 1990, at London's United Oxford & Cambridge Club.

In 1971, The League had numerous peers and notables as high-profile members, including The 13th Viscount Massereene, The 26th Baron Mowbray, and John Biggs-Davison, MP, who was also on The league's 'Council of Honour'. In 1972, the Chancellor announced he had appointed Mr. Nicholas Parker as "Director of Propaganda". Count Nikolai Tolstoy-Miloslavsky joined in late 1975, and Prince Moshin Ali Khan of Hyderabad and Lord Sudeley (Vice-Chancellor from 1985) were both announced as new members in 1980.

The League had an active youth wing (under 21s), run in the mid-1960s by David Charlesworth. In February 1979, Lord Nicholas Hervey was elected as President of the International Youth Association of The League, and contributed in the July 1981 edition of The Monarchist an article entitled "The Youth Association Spreading its Wings". In 1985 he also became a League Vice-Chancellor, and made the formal toast to the guests, the Prince and Princess of Lippe, at The League's Annual Dinner in the Cholmondeley Room, The House of Lords, on 1 April 1986. Lord Nicholas Hervey remained active in the league until 1992 when he retired due to ill-health.

== Restoration of activities ==
The Monarchist League had become virtually dormant by the mid-1980s, although Michael Wynne-Parker continued to engage in debates on behalf of The League, such as the one in 1982 at Wymondham College, Norfolk, when the motion, proposed by a Mr. Matehall, a member of the Communist Party, was "This House would Abolish the Monarchy". The motion was soundly defeated. Gregory Lauder-Frost, who had joined The League in January 1979, also organised a major dinner at the House of Lords on 9 February 1984, when the guests-of-honour were Prince & Princess Tomislav of Yugoslavia.

Delegates at the European Monarchists' Congress, 1990, L to R: Gregory Lauder-Frost (UK Monarchist League), Professor István Kállay (St.Stephen's Crown Society, Budapest), Randall J. Dicks (US Constantian Society), Sergio Boschiero ("Fert" – National Monarchist Movement, Italy).

The death of The 6th Marquess of Bristol in March 1985 meant the end of any kind of future subsidy and left The League overdrawn at the bank as a result. One edition of The Monarchist appeared that year and none at all the following year. It appeared for the last time in February 1987 following which Michael Wynne-Parker retired. He was replaced by Kenneth McLennan Hay, BEM, who served a two-year term as Secretary-General. But he lived in Edinburgh, which was inconvenient for a body based in London.

Lauder-Frost was called in to become Publications Editor (March 1987– December 1992), and Henry von Blumenthal became Treasurer. Major re-organisation by this duo of The League and its finances took place in 1988, Lauder-Frost emphasising that "we are not just a social group, but a serious pressure group carrying out a very demanding role in the face of much opposition." In Autumn 1989, Kenneth Hay stated that The League was "indebted" to Lauder-Frost, his publications for The League being "received with enthusiasm", mentioning "the letters of appreciation" he had received "from members and non-members alike." Also that year, von Blumenthal began developing a system of collaboration with other monarchist organisations, and compiled The Monarchists' Directory and which was published by Lauder-Frost in The League's Newsletter for the first time in 1989. Von Blumenthal also attempted to develop a monarchist ideology; his article "The Royalist Reasoning" is the basis for The League's current manifesto. This led to a number of important reforms, chief of which were the establishment of a UK branch network and re-activation of the branches in the United States and Australia. One of the most successful UK branches, in Kent, was led by von Blumenthal, who had recruited Don Foreman as its secretary.

Kenneth Hay was able to report in Autumn 1989 that "The League is forging ahead". He stood down at the end of 1989 and was replaced by Lauder-Frost whom he described as having an "active mind and restless energy, who has edited the Newsletter and Policy Papers with success". Meanwhile, Anthony J. Bailey and W. Denis Walker both joined the Grand Council as Ordinary Members in March 1990, Bailey serving for three years. Lauder-Frost served a two-year term as Secretary-General of the League, whilst continuing in his longer dual role as its Publications Officer. He stood down as Secretary-General on 31 December 1991, praised "for the high profile the League achieved under his guidance" and was replaced by Don Foreman, Secretary of the Kent Branch, who remained in post until 2002.

== Events ==
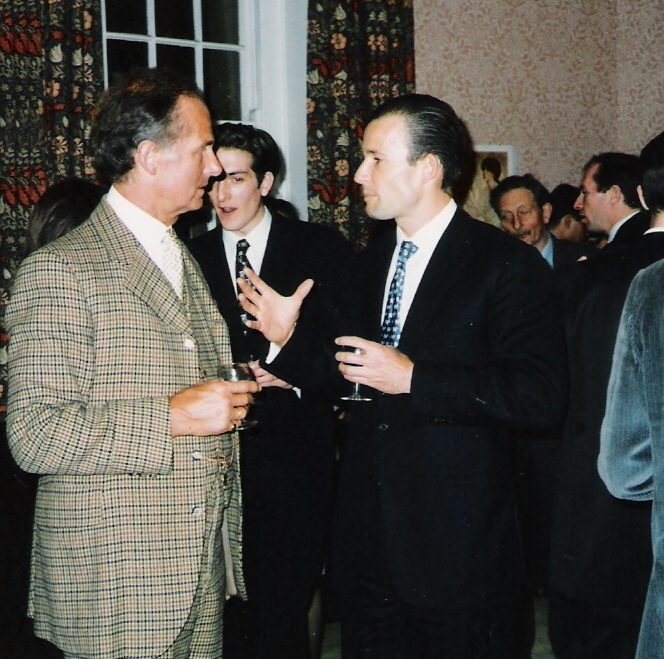
Chancellor, Count Tolstoy-Miloslavsky (left), and Prince Kyrill of Bulgaria at a Reception at Brasenose College, Oxford, on 17 February 1996. Gregory Lauder-Frost (profile) is on the right.

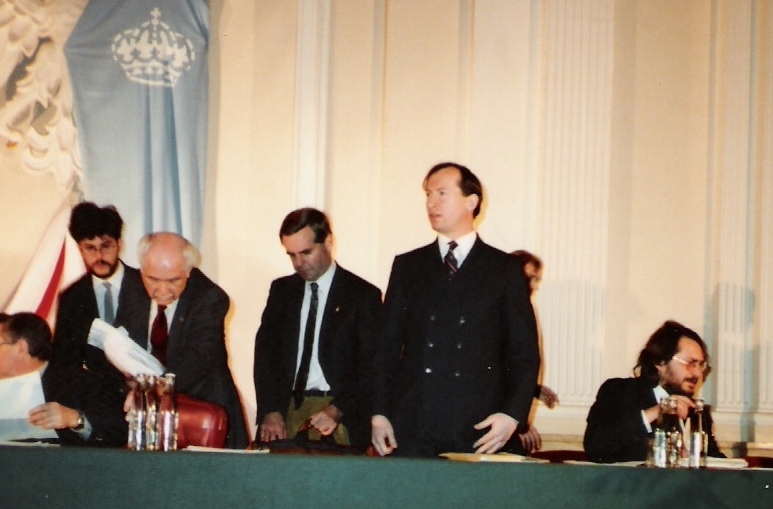
European Monarchist Congress, Warsaw, 8–9 Dec 1990. Gregory Lauder-Frost standing centre, Paul Benoit, Vice-President of the ML of Canada is to his right and Ivan Marczewski of the Bulgarian Monarchist-Conservative Union sits on his left.

From 1988, The League stepped up functions as a way of bringing in new members and raising funds. The July 1988 Annual Dinner took place in Dartmouth House, Mayfair, with Guests-of-Honour being Crown Prince Alexander of Yugoslavia and the Duke of St. Albans. Jacqueline, Lady Killearn hosted a reception at her home in Harley Street, London, in April 1989, for members and their guests. 1990 was a busy year for functions, with a House of Lords Dinner in March and over 100 members and guests at a summer reception, hosted by Conservative MP Neil Hamilton, in Westminster Hall on 17 July. Lord Sudeley and Gregory Lauder-Frost represented The League (at their own expense) at a major fund-raising dinner in New York City on 15 June 1990, which had been organised by New York member David Evans, and the Reverend (now Canon) Dr. Kenneth Gunn-Walberg. On 8–9 December that year Lauder-Frost also represented The League at the European Monarchist Conference in Warsaw, Poland, which attracted over 350 delegates from Europe, and several from North America. He returned immediately for The League's Christmas reception at London's Lansdowne Club on the 10th. A League seminar followed on 26 January 1991 addressed by Dimitri Dostoevsky, a great-grandson of the author. This event was filmed for a BBC documentary entitled Dostoevsky's Travels, broadcast on BBC2 TV on 9 October 1991. Under Don Foreman's auspices, a new South-Eastern Counties branch was inaugurated in September 1991, and Lauder-Frost organised another dinner at the House of Lords on 30 November 1992, with the Guest-of-Honour being HRH Prince Shwebomin of Burma. The functions strategy, coupled with publications, was shown to be paying off by Spring 1992, when it was announced that in the previous three months alone 95 new members had joined.

== Today ==
The current Chancellor is Nikolai Tolstoy, who took up the post in late 1987. The Administrator and Treasurer since about 1993 until his death in January 2024 was Denis Walker who was introduced onto the Grand Council on 14 March 1990 by Gregory Lauder-Frost, seconded by Lord Sudeley. In March 2002 a company limited by guarantee was formed, The Monarchist Movement Trust Limited, of which Walker was the Company Secretary and a Director. After being based for 50 years in central London, The League is now based at an office in Bishop's Stortford, Hertfordshire.

== Affiliated organisations ==
An Australian branch of The Monarchist League was founded in 1943. Prior to 1993, due to the growing battle with republicans it was felt that it needed to be an exclusively Australian body to defer criticisms that it was just an offshoot of a UK group; it severed its affiliation in 1993, and became an independent group, the Australian Monarchist League. The separate Monarchist League of Australia replaced it as an affiliate in 2006. The Monarchist League of New Zealand and the Monarchist League of Canada were founded independently of the London-based Monarchist League and had no formal affiliation; however the Canadian league was formed by John Aimers after he attended a 1969 tour of Canada by Lieut.-Col. J. C. du Parc Braham, chancellor of the London-based League. The Canadian League, was formed months later with du Parc Braham having given Aimers a list of 50 Canadian members of the British-based league. The Monarchist League remained in close contact with the Canadian group, and on 11 March 1989, Lord Nicholas Hervey had a long meeting at London's Savoy Hotel with Mr Aimers, then Chairman of the Monarchist League of Canada, in order to examine ways in which the two groups could co-operate more closely.

The Constitutional Monarchy Association is a mid 1990s formation of The Monarchist League and focusses on maintaining and strengthening the constitutional monarchy in Britain. The Association operates from the same office as The Monarchist League, and publishes a journal, The Crown (formerly entitled Realm of Kings). It has often been called upon to respond to anti-monarchist statements within the UK.

== See also ==
- Monarchism
- Australian Monarchist League
- Australians for Constitutional Monarchy
- Constantian Society, an American monarchist movement of the past
- Traditional Britain Group

== Publications ==
- The Monarchist, attempt at quarterly in 1973, but bi-annual until 1984 (incl), once in 1985, and 1987. Quality A5 journal with photos. The editors were Guy Stair Sainty, KStJT, (1975–6), Jeffrey Finestone (1979 – Feb 1987).
- The Crown and Australia by Donald J Markwell, Fellow of Merton College, Oxford, London, 1987, (P/B booklet).
- Monarchist League Newsletter (A4) quarterly, edited by Gregory Lauder-Frost (October 1987 – December 1992 incl.); (became simply Monarchy about 1994). Carried articles, comment, and reports.
- The Betrayal of Bulgaria by Gregory Lauder-Frost, – an assessment of the Bulgarian kingdom in the 20th century, Policy Discussion Paper, Summer 1989. (This essay was translated and reprinted in the Sofia, Bulgaria, newspaper Democracy).
- Monarchy by Professor Charles Arnold-Baker, OBE, London, 1991, (P/B booklet).
- Romanian Essays and Notes edited by Gregory Lauder-Frost, London, February 1991, (P/B booklet).
- China – The Last Years of Empire by Gregory Lauder-Frost, Monarchist League Review Paper, London, June 1992. (This followed on from the essay "China" by the same author in The Monarchist League Newsletter January 1992.)
- The Monarchy, current (2026) three times per annum glossy A4 journal of The International Monarchist League (editor not stated in journal).
- The Crown, current (2026) three times per annum glossy A4 journal of The Constitutional Monarchy Association (editor not stated in journal).
