= Prussian scheme =

Rumored idea for monarchy in the United States

The Prussian scheme refers to the rumor about a supposed suggestion in 1786 by Massachusetts politician Nathaniel Gorham that if the country adopted a constitutional monarchy like England it ought to invite Henry of Prussia, a German prince of the House of Hohenzollern, as the new king.

There was no interest on Prince Henry's part, and no evidence of any action ever taken by anyone.

== Background ==
=== Post-revolutionary monarchist tendencies ===
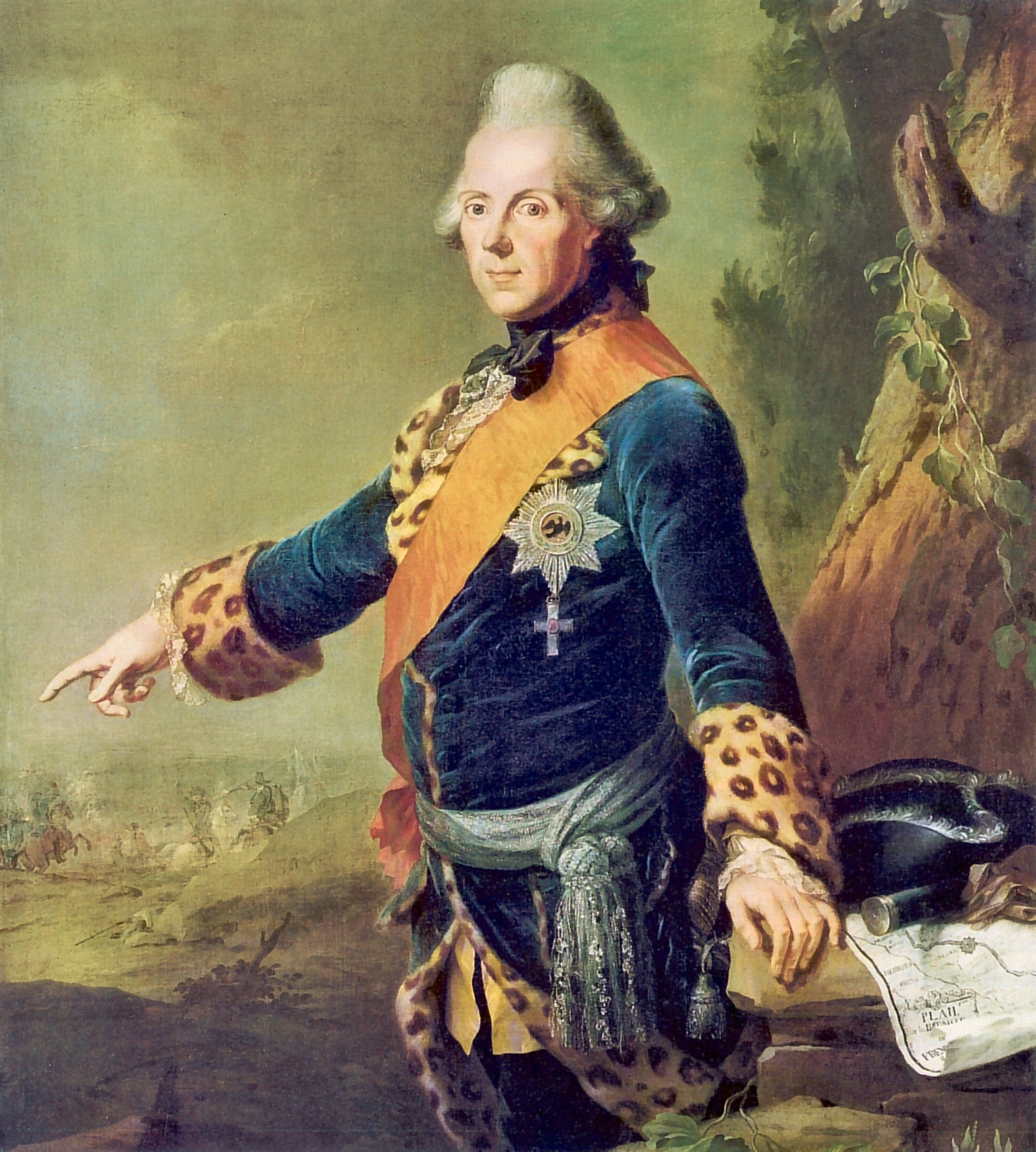
Prince Henry of Prussia was reportedly suggested for the hypothetical throne if the Constitutional Convention of 1787 created a monarchy.

The protracted disturbances created by the shortcomings of the Articles of Confederation as the United States' constitution, which culminated in Shays' Rebellion, reportedly gave rise to a small "class of men in the community who gave very serious apprehensions to the advocates for a Republican form of government". During the May 1787 convening of the Philadelphia Convention that met in secret to write a new constitution, rumors were heard that the convention might adopt the British system of a constitutional monarch. And if it did so, the rumor had it that there was a possibility of inviting Prince Frederick, Duke of York and Albany to be king of the United States. The convention issued a public denial that any such proposal existed and the rumor died out.

=== American attitudes toward Prussia ===
American public opinion at the time generally regarded Prussia warmly. Prince Henry's older brother, Frederick the Great, harbored an "immense hatred" toward Great Britain for having abandoned Prussia near the end of the Seven Years' War. During the American Revolution, Frederick had closed Prussian territory to passage by the army of the Principality of Anhalt-Zerbst, a British ally. This required military forces from the landlocked nation to make a circuitous journey to reach a seaport for deployment to North America, during which nearly half of Anhalt-Zerbst troops deserted. Similar restrictions were placed on troops from other British allies attempting to transit to North America, including the Principality of Bayreuth, the Margraviate of Ansbach, and the Landgraviate of Hesse-Kassel.

== Proposal ==
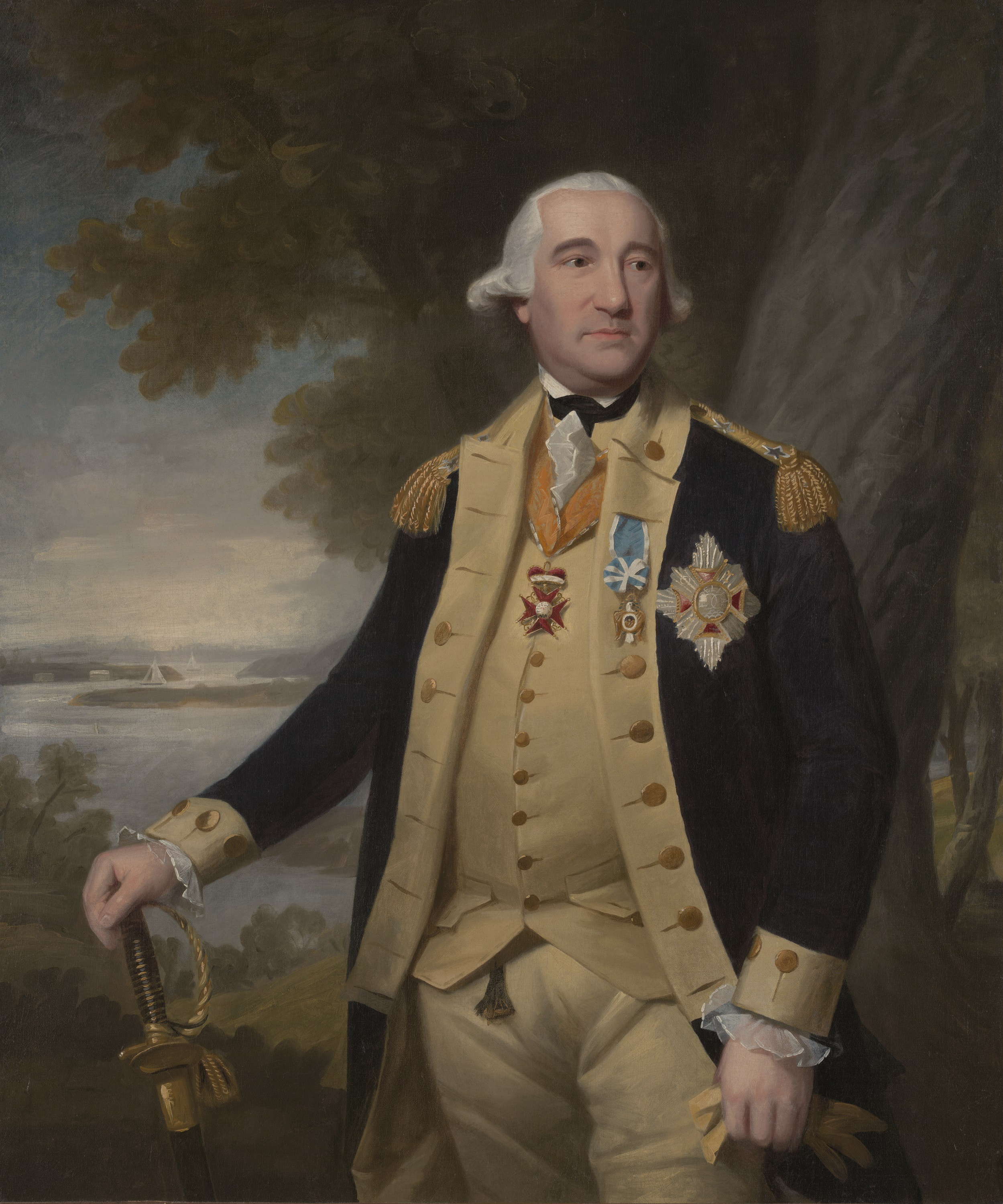
In the early 20th century a letter was discovered from Henry of Prussia to the Prussian-American general Baron Von Steuben (pictured) seemingly confirming the veracity of the "Prussian scheme" story.

=== Early allegations ===
According to Rufus King in the 1820s, in 1786 Nathaniel Gorham secretly corresponded with Prince Henry of Prussia regarding his availability as monarch of the United States. Henry had no interest and he did not believe the American public would be likely to submit to a king. Rufus King's story of Gorham's offer was long considered apocryphal, though James Monroe in the 1820s told Andrew Jackson that he was aware some unnamed politicians who would later become members of the Federalist Party had "entertained principles unfriendly to our system of government".

=== Possible confirmation ===
In the early 20th century an unsent draft of a letter was discovered in the Prussian archives from Henry, addressed to Baron Friedrich Wilhelm von Steuben. The letter refers to a vague proposal the prince had received substantially similar to that detailed in the original story. In it, Henry reports he is not interested in an American crown but suggests that a French candidate would be better than a Prussian. However Prince Henry never sent the draft to Steuben. At the convention no mention whatever was made of any sort of monarchy.

== Influence ==
Some have attributed the natural-born-citizen clause in the U.S. constitution as an attempt by the Philadelphia Convention to end the persistence of rumors of European royalty being invited to assume a hypothetical United States throne.

== See also ==
- Newburgh Conspiracy (a possible military coup rejected by Washington in 1783)
- Newburgh letter (a private letter by Lewis Nicola to George Washington suggesting he could be king of the United States; Washington was outraged.)
