= Charles Coulomb =

Charles Coulomb may refer to:

- Charles-Augustin de Coulomb (1736–1806), French physicist known for his work in electromagnetics
- Charles A. Coulombe, American author
