= International Theological Institute =

Coordinates: 47.9929°N 16.3376°E

ITI Catholic University
- Katholische Hochschule ITI
- Coat of arms
- Former name: International Theological Institute
- Motto: Sicut Cervus ad Fontes (Latin)
- Motto in English: As the deer longs for the springs
- Type: Private; Ecclesiastical
- Established: 1996; 30 years ago
- Founder: Pope St. John Paul II
- Affiliations: Roman Catholic
- President: Dr. Bernhard Dolna
- Dean: Dr. Simon M. Kopf
- Grand Chancellor: Mag. Josef Grünwidl
- Faculty: Dr. Michaela Hastetter; Dr. Thomas Möllenbeck; Fr. Josef Spindelböck; Dr. Gintautas Vaitoska; Dr. Michael Wladika and more
- Students: 115
- Location: Schloss Trumau, Austria
- Website: ITI.AC.AT

ITI Catholic University (German: Katholische Hochschule ITI) is a Catholic theological school in Austria. The school was founded in 1996 as the International Theological Institute at the request of Pope John Paul II. It was then located in the Kartause Gaming and moved in 2009 to Schloss Trumau near Vienna. Its motto is 'Sicut cervus ad fontes'. The ITI's patrons are St. Thérèse of the Child Jesus, St. Thomas Aquinas and St. Zdislava of Lemberk.

The ITI's mission, as established by Pope John Paul II, unites in a special manner the Eastern and Western traditions of the Church. The Mass/Divine Liturgy is celebrated daily in both the Roman and Byzantine Rites respectively. From its inception the ITI has also given special attention to marriage and family. The Institute employs the Great Books method in its pedagogy in preference to lecture-based instruction in the encyclopedist tradition. The ITI is committed to the primacy of Thomas Aquinas in Philosophy and Theology, it gives a special weighting to the Greek Fathers.

The student body tends to number around 70-90 students from all five continents. Among its notable alumni includes American Catholic author Charles Coulombe KCSS who graduated in 2023.

On March 1, 2021, the school's name was changed to "Katholische Hochschule ITI" in German, and "ITI Catholic University" in English.

== Academics ==
The institute's common language is English. Students taking canonical degrees are also instructed in or possess proficiency in Latin and Greek.

=== Degrees ===
In addition to the canonical degrees of STD, STL, and STB, the ITI offers a BA in Liberal Arts, a dedicated master’s programme in Marriage and the Family (MMF), and a one-year, credit-only Studium Generale programme. Since 2021, the university has also offered three professional, non‑canonical master’s programmes: a Master’s in Educational and Pedagogical Studies (MEP), a Master’s in Law, Economics and Politics (MLEP), and a Master’s in Culture and Media Studies (MCM).

=== Presidents of the ITI ===
1. Dr. Michael Waldstein
2. Msgr. Dr. Larry Hogan
3. Dr. Christiaan Alting von Geusau
4. Dr. habil. Bernhard Dolna
