= John Edward Bazille-Corbin =

English attorney, priest, and author

- Born: John Edward Bazille-Corbin; 9 October 1887; Saint Peter Port, Guernsey, Channel Islands, U.K.
- Died: 30 April 1964 (aged 76)

John Edward Bazille-Corbin (né Corbin; 9 October 1887 – 30 April 1964) was an English attorney, Anglo-Catholic priest, liturgist, antiquarian, and author active in monarchist activities.

== Works ==
- The Order for the Celebration of Low Mass according to the Use of the Illustrious Church of Salisbury (1951)
- Toward a Uniate Rite (1952)
- Notes, Historical, Liturgical and Practical, for the Guidance of the Priest at Low Mass (1953)
- Runwell S. Mary: A Farrago of History, Archaeology, Legend and Folk-lore, Collected and Pieced together during an Incumbency of Many Years (no date)

== Sources ==
- Crockford's Clerical Directory 1921-1964
- Obituary, The Church Times, May 15, 1964
- Le Crépuscule de la chevalerie (1975)
- Gary L. Ward, Bertil Persson, Alan Bain, Independent Bishops: An International Directory (Apogee, 1990) ISBN 9781558883079
- James Rattue, The Living Stream: Holy Wells in Historical Context (2001) ISBN 9780851158488
