= Michael Wynne-Parker =

British consultant, author and lecturer (born 1945)

Michael Wynne-Parker (born 20 November 1945) is a British author and businessman who is the founder and chairman of Introcom International.

== Biography ==
Born in Cromford, Derbyshire, he was educated at Lady Manners School. Born Michael Parker, in 1973 his name was legally changed to Michael Wynne-Parker by deed poll.

According to The Guardian, Wynne-Parker has twice been banned by official watchdogs from giving financial advice and serving as a company director.

Wynne-Parker was Principal Secretary of the International Monarchist League from the late 1970s. Following the Marquess of Bristol's death, he became the league's Acting Chancellor until 1987 when Count Nikolai Tolstoy was appointed to that position. Wynne-Parker was then made a Vice-Chancellor, a post which he held until standing down in March 1990.

He was vice-president of The Castle of Mey Trust in 2015.

He once unsuccessfully stood in Norfolk council elections.

On 29 January 2024, Wynne-Parker was disqualified by the Charity Commission from being a trustee or senior manager at any charity for 12 years. Among other findings, the Charity Commission found that £193,730 of donations intended for The King's Foundation were transferred from The Mahfouz Foundation's bank account to trustee Michael Wynne-Parker's private company's bank account.

== Awards ==
He was made a Knight Commander of the Military and Hospitaller Order of St Lazarus of Jerusalem (KCLJ) in 1980.

== Publications ==
- Bridge Over Troubled Water: An insight into the English-Speaking Union and its influence in South Asia (1989)
- If My Table Could Talk: Insights Into Remarkable Lives (2011)
