= Charles A. Coulombe =

American traditionalist Catholic writer (born 1960)

Roy-Charles A. Coulombe KCSS
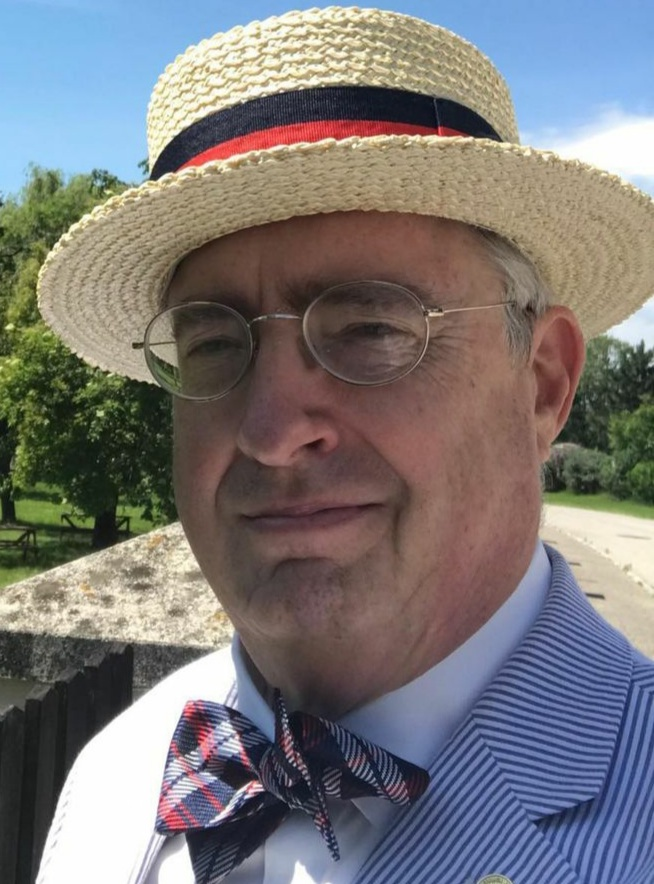
- Born: Roy-Charles A. Coulombe; November 8, 1960 (age 65); Manhattan, New York, U.S.
- Education: New Mexico Military Institute (AA); California State University, Northridge (BA); International Theological Institute (Mag. theol.)
- Occupations: Author; historian; lecturer
- Writing career
- Notable work: Vicars of Christ: A History of the Popes
- Literary movement: Traditionalist Catholicism, Monarchism

Roy-Charles A. Coulombe KCSS (born November 8, 1960), known as Charles A. Coulombe, is an American Catholic author, historian, and lecturer. Coulombe is known for his advocacy of monarchism.

== Early life and education ==
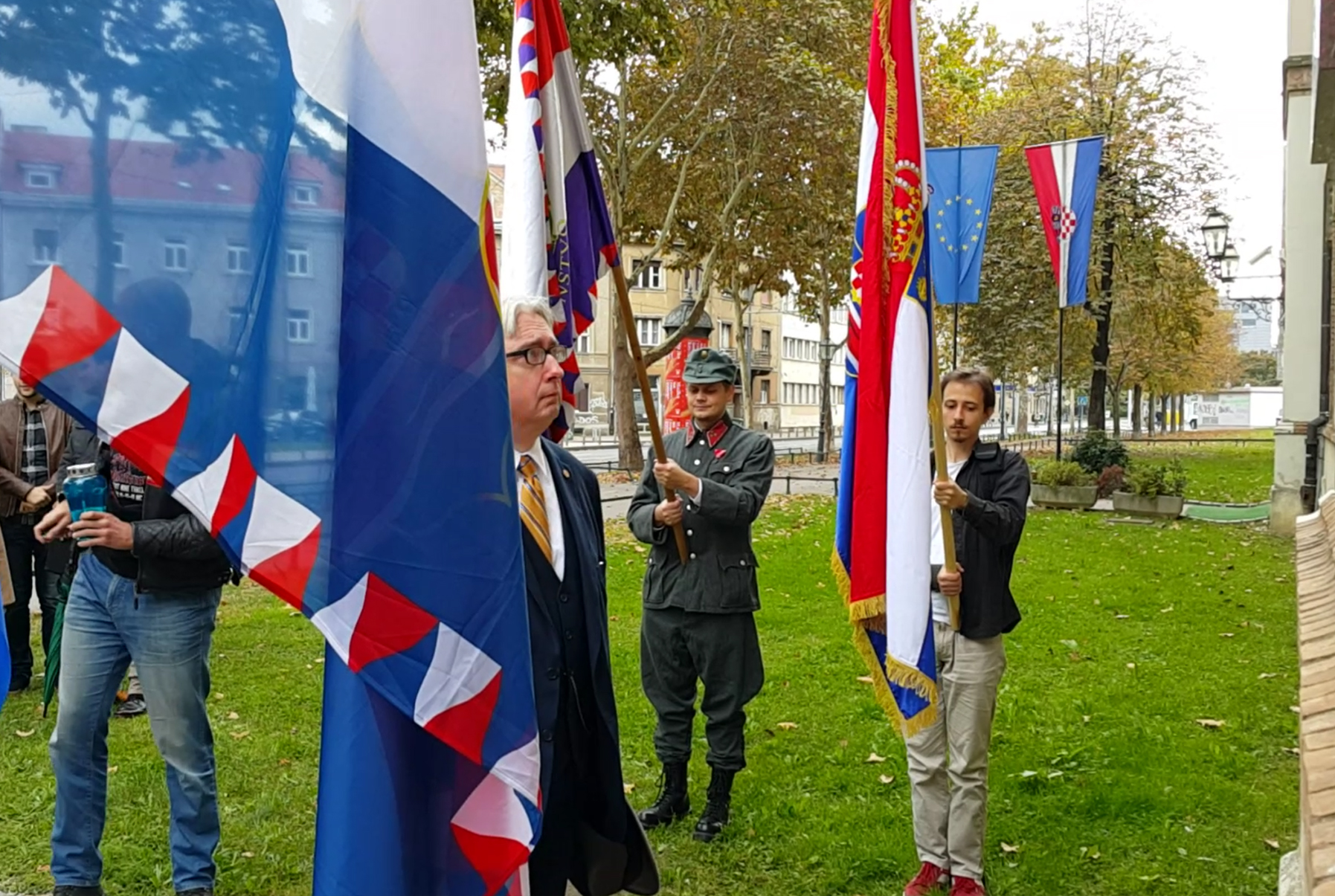
2018, Coulombe during a World War I commemoration in Zagreb, organized by Croatian monarchists and nobility

Roy-Charles A. Coulombe was born on November 8, 1960, in Manhattan, New York, and was raised in the Hudson Valley by his parents, Guy J.C. Coulombe (1926–1996) and Patricia Coulombe (1925–2015). His father was a tail gunner in the Pacific Theatre of World War II. They later moved to Los Angeles.

Coulombe attended California State University, Northridge, where he obtained a Bachelor of Arts in political science. He also studied at the International Theological Institute in Austria, to obtain a Magister Theologiae.

== Career ==
Coulombe has been an editor and movie reviewer to the National Catholic Register, and a contributor to publications as the Catholic Herald, Success, Catholic Twin Circle, and FATE. He is also an author with publications such as the European Conservative and has been interviewed by Vulture.

Coulombe was commended by Pope John Paul II for his book Vicars of Christ: A History of the Popes, and by order of John Paul II, Coulombe was created a Knight Commander of the Order of St. Sylvester for his services rendered to the Holy See. He has later on also provided narration for ABC News, Fox News, and for the BBC during the funeral of John Paul II and the election and installation of Pope Benedict XVI. Coulombe had also been awarded the Christian Law Institute's Christ King Journalism Award in 1992.

== Politics ==
Coulombe served as the Western U.S. Delegate to the Grand Council of International Monarchist League. Coulombe is a founding board member of the Queen of Angels Foundation, a Roman Catholic devotional society based in Los Angeles. In 1995, Coulombe met Mwami Kigeli V as a representative of the International Monarchist League .

He is member of the Catholic lay organisation Gebetsliga (Emperor Karl League of Prayers for Peace among Nations) and an honorary member of the Croatian Royal Council.

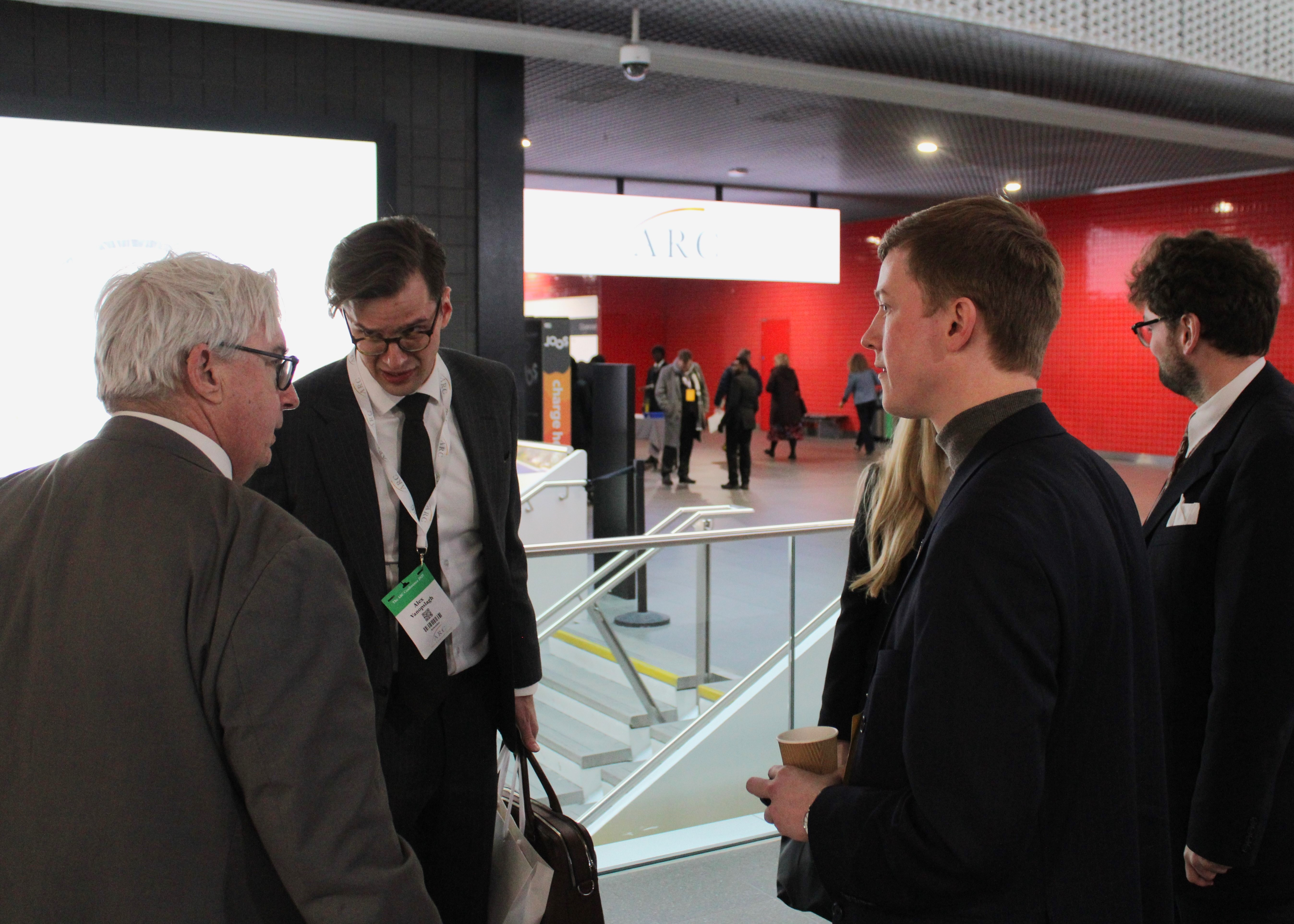
Coulombe with Alex Vanopslag and Mikkel Bjørn at the Alliance for Responsible Citizenship, London, 2025

Coulombe supports the American Solidarity Party, and has credited Otto von Habsburg as influential on his political beliefs. He has described himself as "not a great fan" of U.S. President Donald Trump. Coulombe defended Trump during his first impeachment and criminal indictments, while criticizing Trump's expansionist policies, support for same-sex marriage, and support of IVF. Coulombe has expressed criticism of Israel, describing their treatment of Palestinians as a "terrible injustice".

== Bibliography ==
- Coulombe, Charles A., ed. The Muse in the Bottle: Great Writers on the Joys of Drinking, New York, Citadel Press, 2002. ISBN 0-8065-2371-9
- —, ed., Classic Horror Stories: Sixteen Legendary Stories of the Supernatural, Guilford, Lyons Press, 2003. ISBN 1-59228-200-8
- Haunted Castles of the World: Ghostly Legends and Phenomena from Keeps and Fortresses Around the Globe, Guilford, Conn., Lyons Press, 2004. ISBN 1-59228-534-1
- Haunted Places in America: A Guide to Spooked and Spooky Public Places in the United States, Guilford, Conn., Lyons Press, 2004. ISBN 1-59228-415-9
- Rum: The Epic Story of the Drink That Conquered the World, Citadel, 2004. ISBN 0-8065-2581-9
- The Pope's Legion: The Multinational Fighting Force that Defended the Vatican, New York, Palgrave Macmillan, 2008. ISBN 978-0-230-60058-4
- Puritan's Empire, Tumblar House, 2008. ISBN 978-0-9791600-5-9
- Desire & Deception, Tumblar House, 2009. ISBN 978-0-9842365-1-0
- The White Cockade: Catholic Poetry and Verse, Tumblar House, 2009. ISBN 978-0-9842365-0-3
- Everyman Today Call Rome, Tumblar House, 2011. ISBN 978-0-9842365-6-5
- Vicars of Christ, Tumblar House, 2014. ISBN 978-0-9883537-2-5
- Star-Spangled Crown, Tumblar House, 2016. ISBN 978-1-944339-05-0
- A Catholic Quest for the Holy Grail, Charlotte, NC, TAN Books, 2017. ISBN 978-1-5051-0968-9
- Blessed Charles of Austria: A Holy Emperor and His Legacy, TAN Books, 2020. ISBN 978-1-5051-1328-0
- The Complete Monarchist, OS Justi Press, 2025. ISBN 978-1-9653-0320-7
- Zita: Empress of Austria and Queen of Hungary, TAN Books, 2025. ISBN 978-1-5051-2730-0
