= Constantian Society =

US political group

The Constantian Society was a political group in the United States devoted to promoting the system of constitutional monarchy as a superior form of government. It was founded in 1970. The official publication of the Constantian Society was The Constantian; Journal of the Constantian Society. Randall J. Dicks (1951 – 1999) was the founder of the society.

As a Georgetown University student, Dicks was chosen to ask a question of President Richard Nixon, and in commenting to reporters on the President's reply said that "monarchy was the superior form of government." Nixon's aides had been unaware of Dicks' political beliefs.

In 1989, the society participated in a Mass for the repose of the souls of Louis XVI, Marie Antoinette and other victims of the French Revolution.

With the founder's death, its activities ceased.
