= Lewis Nicola =

Irish-born American military officer, merchant, and writer (1717–1807)

- Born: 1717; Dublin, Ireland
- Died: August 9, 1807 (aged 89–90); Alexandria, Virginia, U.S.
- Military career
- Allegiance: Great Britain; United States
- Branch: British Army; Continental Army; United States Army
- Service years: 1740–1760 (Great Britain); 1775–1798 (United States)
- Rank: Major (Great Britain); Brigadier General (United States)
- Commands: Invalid Corps
- Conflicts: Revolutionary War
- Other work: American Society for Promoting Useful Knowledge; Merchant; Society of the Cincinnati

Lewis Nicola (1717 – August 9, 1807) was an Irish-born American military officer, merchant, and writer who held various military and civilian positions throughout his career. Nicola is most notable for authoring the Newburgh letter, which urged George Washington to assume a royal title. Born in Dublin, Ireland, Nicola had been an officer in the British Army, serving in Europe before immigrating to the Thirteen Colonies. Establishing a residence in Philadelphia with his family, Nicola opened a library in 1767 and was active in colonial philosophical organizations. As a result of his work to establish the American Philosophical Society, he was elected as one of its curators. When the American Revolution broke out, Nicola offered his services to the colonial government, which eventually appointed him to various positions with local forces.

In 1777, Nicola proposed that the Continental Congress establish the Invalid Corps. The Congress accepted his proposal and appointed him as its commander. The Corps was stationed at various Pennsylvania locations before moving to West Point, New York. In 1782, after the end of most hostilities but before the signing of the Treaty of Paris, Nicola wrote the Newburgh letter, which was received coldly by Washington. Returning to civilian life, Nicola nevertheless was still active in military affairs, and was recalled to service during the 1790s, despite his advanced age. During this period, he continued to research for the American Philosophical Society, writing an especially controversial document entitled The Divinity of Jesus Christ Considered, From Scripture Evidences, in which he claimed that the divinity of Jesus Christ is not supported by scripture. He died in 1807, in the possession of only $55.

== Early life and entry into the British Army ==
Very little is known of Nicola's early years. He was born in 1717 in Dublin, Ireland, to a British Army officer. His grandparents were Huguenot refugees, and he was 511/512 French and 1/512 Italian by blood. His parents provided him with a strong educational background and bought him a commission in January 1740. Later into that year, he married his first wife, Christiana Doyle, on September 19. During the 1740s, Nicola was stationed in various Irish cities: Galway, Derry, Cork, among others. He was briefly stationed in Flanders in 1745 before he moved back to Charles Fort near Kinsale.

== First decade in Pennsylvania ==
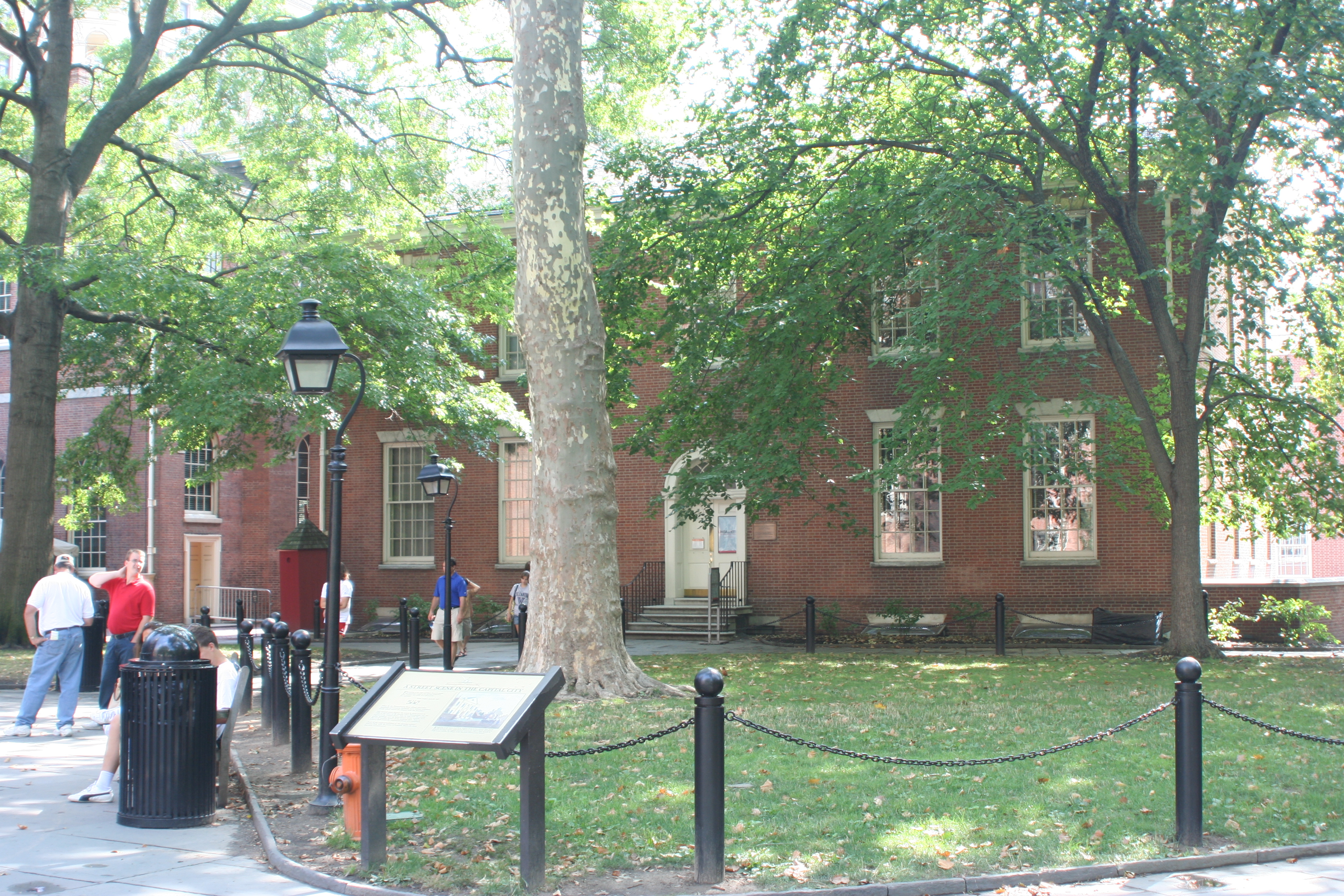
West side of the American Philosophical Society building in Philadelphia, PA.

Doyle died in August 1759, and Nicola married his second wife, Jane Bishop, on April 18, 1760. Their family decided to move to Philadelphia, Pennsylvania, and they arrived August 1766. Upon the arrival Nicola started his own dry goods store. This did not work, and he eventually opened a library in September 1767. It started with nearly 200 to 300 volumes before expanding to over 1,000. Throughout the next couple of years, Nicola moved the library to different spots before finally settling to Spruce Street and renaming it "General Circulating Library".

With the help of his friend John Morgan, Nicola was admitted into the American Society for Promoting Useful Knowledge. By the following year, he became a part of the committee to help a merger with the American Philosophical Society. The merger was completed in November 1768, and Nicola was elected as one of the curators. At the start of the next year, Nicola decided to quit the dry good business for good and focus more on writing, stating "[Magazines were] the taste of the age, and found to possess many conveniences, such as gratifying the curiosity of the public, and serving as a repository for many small, though valuable pieces that would otherwise be lost to the world." He began editing his new periodical, the American Magazine, or General Repository, and the first issue was published in January 1769. This magazine, devoted to science, poetry, British and American news, folded in December after only nine issues. Nicola, however, continued to conduct research and write articles for the Society.

== Re-entry into the Army and writing activities ==
Due to financial difficulties, Nicola and his family moved between various Pennsylvanian cities throughout the 1770s. Once the American Revolutionary War broke out, however, he realized that his military skills were probably most needed in Philadelphia. In July 1775, Nicola was hired by the Pennsylvania Council of Safety to inspect the local defenses in place along the banks of the Delaware River. Since this was the only military position offered to him, in January 1776 Nicola opened a beer-selling shop. Shortly thereafter, he opened a school to help children in various disciplines of mathematics and engineering. This endeavor was short-lived, however, as the Pennsylvania Council of Safety gave him a second military position, this time as a barracks master. While attaining that position (which he was granted in February), Nicola composed and presented to the Council of Safety a "Plan of a Powder Magazine" and saw to the repair of the city jailhouse, for which he was reimbursed $226 by the Continental Congress. On December 2, 1776, Nicola was made Town Major of Pennsylvania. It was at this time that he wrote one of the earliest American drill manuals "A Treatise for Military Exercise Calculated of the use of the Americans" published in 1776.

== Tenure with the Invalid Corps ==
=== Invalid Corps under Nicola in the early years ===
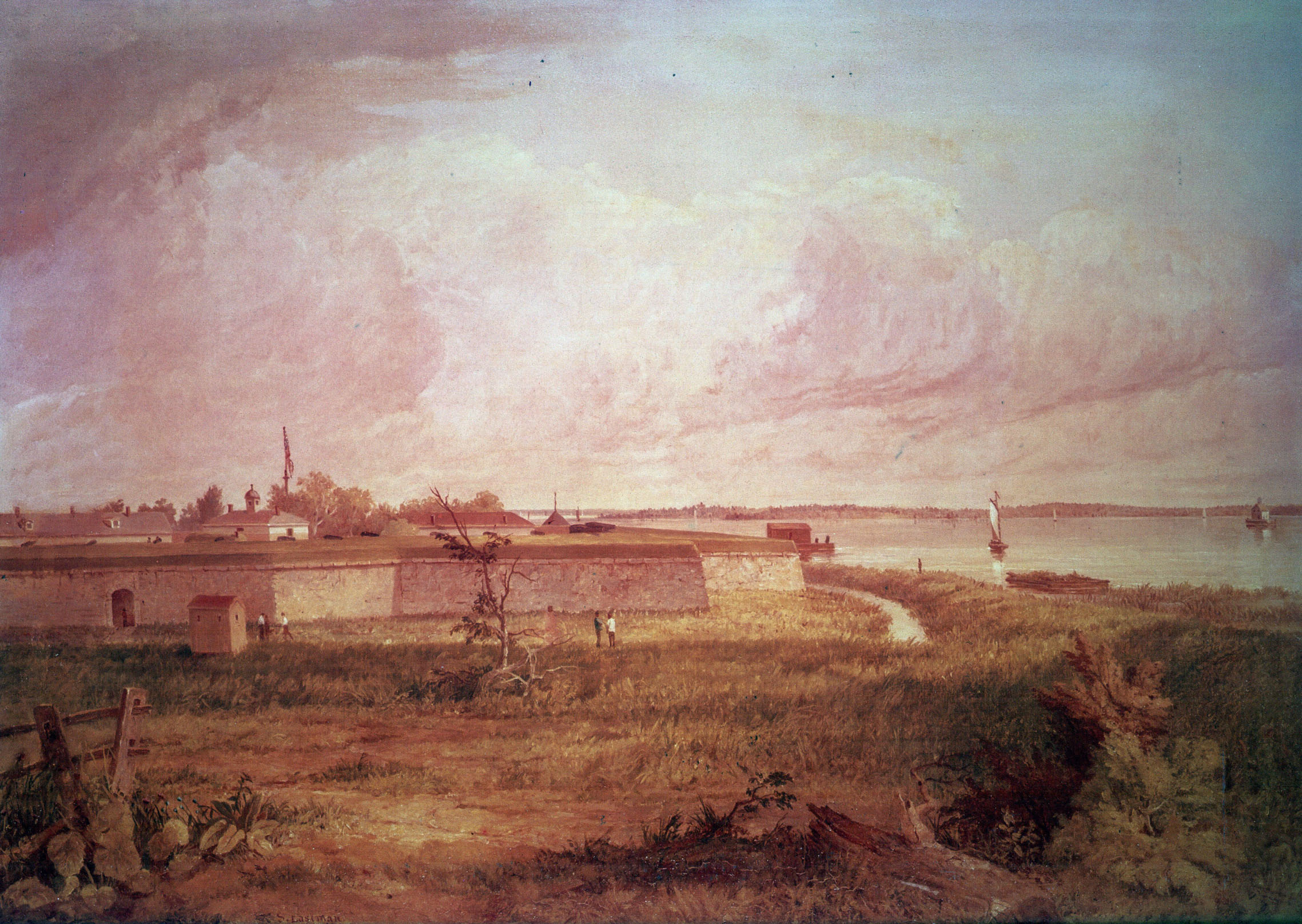
A painting of Fort Mifflin by Seth Eastman (1870)

In March 1777, Nicola proposed to the Continental Congress the formation of an "Invalid Corps," a group of men unfit for combat but still able to perform other military duties. In June, the Continental Congress accepted the proposal, appointing Nicola the commander of about 1,000 troops divided into eight companies of soldiers. The Invalid Corps was stationed in Philadelphia for most part of the Revolutionary War, but it was forced to move once General William Howe advanced into the city in 1777.

On September 25, 1777, the Invalid Corps retreated to Fort Mifflin. Due to sickness, lack of clean water, and worries about British incursions, it was recommended to Nicola that he move the Corps to Trenton, New Jersey. Upon arriving at Trenton, Nicola moved to defend locals' property, seeing "a large vessel in the river [near Bordentown] with a very valuable Cargo belonging to Congress which was in danger of falling into the enemies hands", and taking thirty men to claim the cargo.

Following its brief stay in Trenton, the Invalid Corps moved to Allentown, Pennsylvania, as suggested by Richard Peters on September 29, 1777. However, instead of Allentown, the Corps was eventually stationed at Easton and Bethlehem, Pennsylvania, to assist in the management of hospitals and stores. Like the rest of the Continental Army, the Invalid Corps suffered harshly from the winter of 1777 to 1778. After a brief period in the camp of Valley Forge in the spring of 1778, the Invalid Corps moved back to their original quarters at Philadelphia, just after the British evacuated from it.

=== Service prior to 1782 ===
The Invalid Corps continued its many moves, including one from Pennsylvania to Boston. However, for the next three years, the Corps remained either in Philadelphia or the future Massachusetts capital. During this three-year period, Nicola drew the "Plan of the English Lines near Philadelphia", which showed the locations of important fortifications from the Delaware River to Schuylkill River as well as other locations of British military facilities. Following the drawing of "Plan", Nicola submitted two papers where he obtained information from the British to Congress: "A Scheme for a Partisan Corps" and "Judicious remarks on a proposed reformation in the Army". Moreover, he strengthened the Corps by recruiting soldiers around Philadelphia.

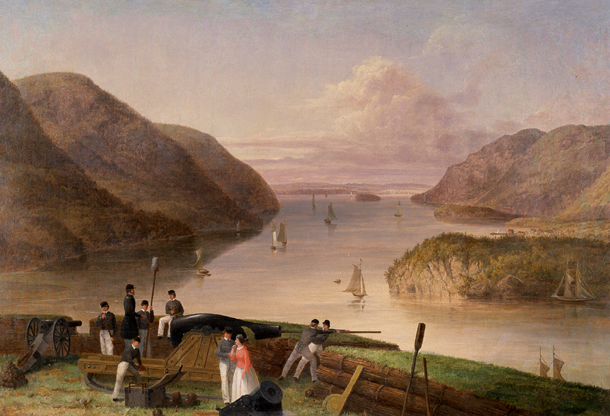
Nicola and the Invalid Corps were stationed at West Point, New York (pictured) and faced multiple difficulties while there.

On June 13, 1781, Nicola and the Invalid Corps was given the order by Congress to move to West Point, New York. This, however, was difficult to accomplish. On June 26, Nicola wrote a letter to George Washington that the Corps would not move until a replacement unit could take over for them. Another reason hindering the move was pay; the Corps did not receive a payment for nearly ten months. A compromise was later reached between Nicola and the Board of War that six months pay would be given to the Invalid Corps. After their leave to Pennsylvania, John David Woelper, a captain of the Invalid Corps, sent a letter to Washington on July 20, 1781, claiming Nicola was treating the Corps badly. In the note, Woelper requested Nicola's arrest. Nicola sent letters about the situation to Washington, who wanted to have it settled as soon as the Corps arrived at West Point. Washington, who did not show any favoritism to either, sent both series of letters to General Alexander McDougall and asked the court in West Point to settle the matter.

Upon the arrival of the Invalid Corps at West Point, the charges were dropped, and Nicola was cleared of all charges. On August 4, 1781, Nicola complained to George Washington that the Corps would have great difficult during the winter time. Two months later on September 19, Nicola complained to General Horatio Gates about McDougall's lack of respect to the Corps. Eventually, Nicola proposed to Washington that the Invalid Corps should move back to Philadelphia; however, for various reasons, Washington denied it.

During the Corps' tenure at West Point, Nicola faced many challenges. Firstly, his troops did not act the way he wanted. In October 1777, Nicola sent out an arrest warrant for Sergeant Major Jonathan Guy for giving uniforms of the Continental Army to the British. The other example was in April 1778; Nicola stopped robberies done by members of the Corps in Easton. Secondly, Nicola was unable to fill the higher ranks because of the lack of qualifications from the men. In a letter to Washington, Nicola wrote that without men, he was unable to "keep the men under proper discipline". During court trials, Nicola had to borrow men from other units as the jury. The third problem was the lack of enlisted men for the Corps.

The final problem was the poor financial situation that Nicola was in. In a letter to the Pennsylvania Supreme Executive Council dated April 7, 1779, Nicola asked for a pay raise, saying he was unable to purchase food or even clothes. Some members of the Invalid Corps claimed they were unable to provide for themselves. On February 5, 1782, the Pennsylvania Supreme Executive Council fired Nicola from the position of Town Major; their reasoning was that no such duty was needed at the time. During that same month and struggling for money, Nicola asked the Continental superintendent of finance Robert Morris for the money that the Congress did not pay the Corps. Even that, however, failed to give the Invalid Corps its money.

=== The Newburgh letter ===
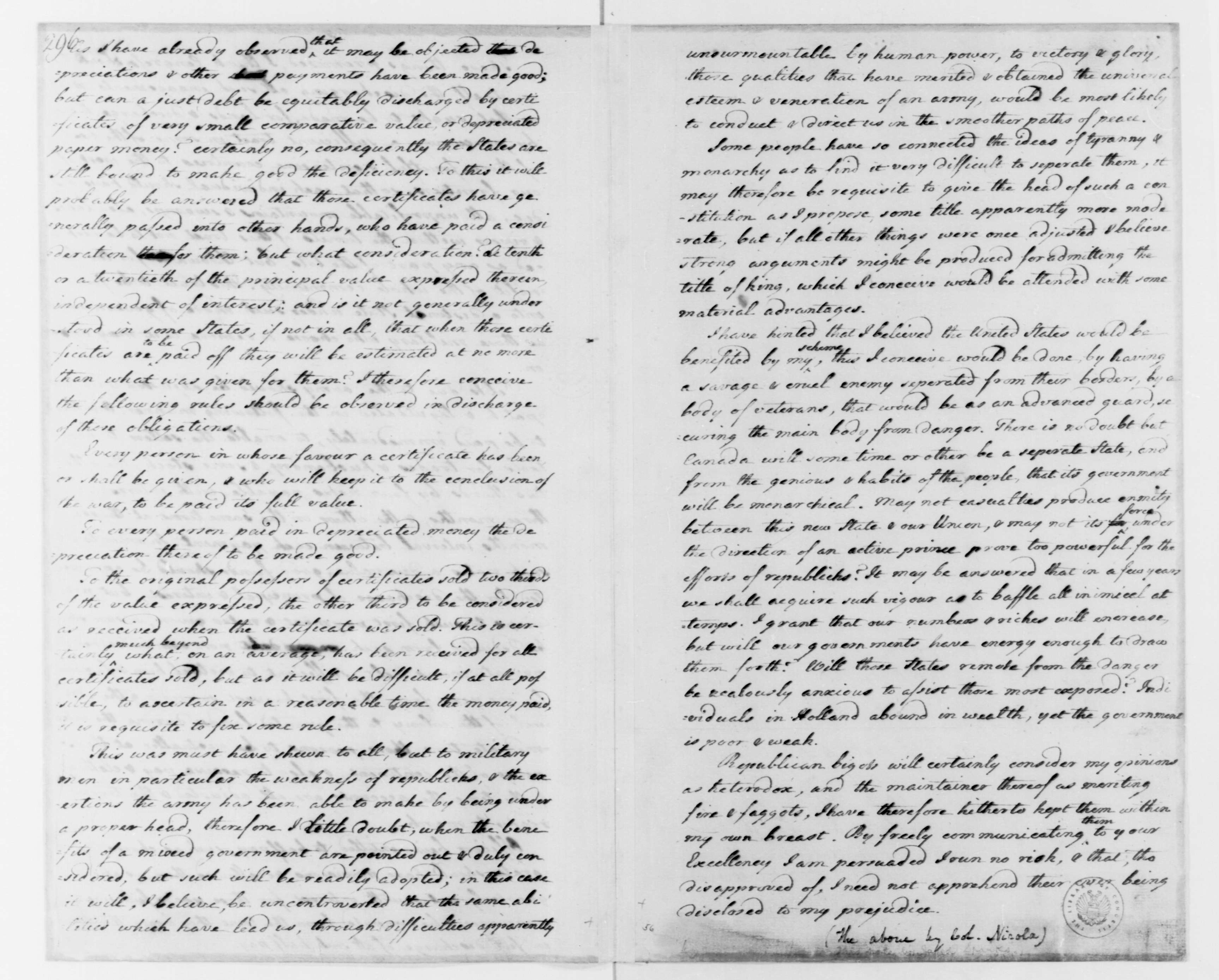
An excerpt of the Newburgh letter (1782).

On May 22, 1782, Nicola wrote the Newburgh letter to George Washington, from his army quarters in Newburgh, New York. Nicola used the first part of the letter to describe a financial hardship that both he and many of the men under his command were facing: their lack of pay. Most of the Army had been waiting for months—some even for years—for their pay from Congress. The justification for this was found in the Articles of Confederation, which allowed the Continental Congress to set up an army in time of war, but was not obligated to levy taxes. The right to collect taxes was reserved for the respective states, most of which were unable to afford the maintenance of an army. Nicola believed that this condition was the manifested weakness of a republic, writing, "When the benefits of a mixed government are pointed out and duly considered, will be examined readily adopted [...]".

Alluding to the person on Nicola wrote Washington, it is well recognized that "The same abilities which have led us, through difficulties apparently insurmountable by human power, to victory and glory, those qualities that have merited and universal esteem and veneration Obtained the of an army, would be most likely to conduct and direct us in the smoother paths of peace.

After concluding his criticism of the republican form of government, Nicola suggested that Washington take the title of king. Recognizing that the terms "tyranny" and "monarchy" had too many negative connotations at the time, Nicola advised using an alternative title in the near future, "[...] But if all other things were once adjusted I believe strong argument might be produced for admitting the title of king, Which I conceive would be attended with some material advantages.

Washington was aware that some feared he aspired to be an "American Cromwell". In his reply, dated the same day he gave Nicola a decidedly clear answer, Washington said, "No incident in the course of the war in me triggers painful feelings as your message, that such ideas are circulating in the army, as you expressed it". Washington mentioned that he knew not what part of his conduct could have given rise to such a petition, which he thought a "calamity" facing the United States. David Humphreys and Jonathan Trumbull, two of Washington's aides, certified in a rare precautionary measure that proved the document to be genuine.

Nicola responded contritely to the harsh rejection of his complaints and suggestions. On May 23 he replied to Washington, expressing his sadness at displeasing Washington, and claiming that "nothing had ever affected" him so greatly as his "reproof." Furthermore, Nicola asked Washington to evaluate every mistake that he had committed. Washington's answer to this and two other letters of apology written by Nicola on May 24 and 28 are not known. However, the relationship between Nicola and Washington soon returned to its prior normalcy.

== Dissolution of the Invalid Corps and promotion ==
In November 1782, Nicola complained to Washington about the fact that secretary at war General Benjamin Lincoln wanted the Invalid Corps dissolved, saying its costliness affected the military more than its benefits. Nicola argued against its dissolution; he claimed that no other regiment had done more service than the Corps. Against the recommendation of Washington, the dissolution of the Invalid Corps was ordered by the Continental Congress in May 1783. Between June and August, Nicola was back on the road to Philadelphia. There he resided for two months after the official conclusion of peace by the Treaty of Paris (1783), serving as a commissioner in regard to the settlement of matters concerning him and his regiment. On November 27, 1793, he was elevated to the rank of brigadier general. In June 1784, Congress finally charged him, for a period of four and a half months, to draw up the certificates for members of his former command.

== Final years ==
In the mid-1780s, Nicola advocated the construction of a stagecoach route between Philadelphia and Reading. Failing to secure the route, he planned to temporarily operate a guest house. For financial reasons, he instead became manager of the workhouse in Philadelphia in 1788. In 1793, Nicola became inspector of the Philadelphia city militia brigade. During the Whiskey Rebellion of 1794, he briefly returned to his former position as barrack master and commander of the city of Philadelphia.

During this period, Nicola maintained his affiliation with the American Philosophical Society, serving multiple terms as curator and continuing with his research. In 1791, he wrote a controversial pamphlet entitled, The Divinity of Jesus Christ Considered, From Scripture Evidences. This pamphlet concluded that Christ's divinity cannot be found in scripture. Due to its controversial nature, Nicola considered publishing it in various forms, but eventually decided on attaching his name to the writing.

Nicola's second wife died in 1797, and he retired the following year. In 1798, he moved to Alexandria, Virginia to be closer to his daughter. He died on August 8, 1807. Earlier in that year, because of financial troubles, he had added the words "any deficiency I presume the Cincinnati society will make good" to his will. At the time of his death, Nicola possessed only $55. He was interred in the cemetery of Alexandria's Old Presbyterian Meeting House.

== Publications ==
- A Treatise of Military Exercise Calculated for the Use of Americans. Philadelphia, PA, US: Styner and Cist. 1776. OCLC 62817306.
- Almanack of Lewis Nicola. OCLC 82824624.
- The American Magazine, or, General Repository. 1 (1–9). Philadelphia, PA, US: American Society for Promoting Useful Knowledge. 1769. OCLC 3388044.
