= Lord Eustace Cecil =

British politician (1834–1921)

Lord Eustace Brownlow Henry (Gascoyne-) Cecil (24 April 1834 – 3 July 1921) was a British, Conservative Party politician.

Cecil was the youngest son of James Gascoyne-Cecil, 2nd Marquess of Salisbury by his first wife Frances Gascoyne and was educated at Harrow and the Royal Military College, Sandhurst. He served with the 43rd Light Infantry and with the Coldstream Guards in the Crimean War from 1855 to 1856, rose to the rank of lieutenant colonel in 1861 and retired from the army in 1863.

In 1874, Conservative Prime Minister Benjamin Disraeli appointed Cecil to be the second Surveyor General of the Ordnance, the Secretary of State for War's principal civilian adviser.

On 18 September 1860, he had married Lady Gertrude Scott (the fourth daughter of John Scott, 2nd Earl of Eldon) and they had three children: Evelyn, later 1st Baron Rockley (1865–1941), Algernon (1879–1953) and Blanche Louise (1872–1945).

His book entitled Impressions of Life at Home and Abroad was published in 1865 by Hurst and Blackett of 13 Great Marlborough Street London. The book was a collection of papers which originally appeared in the St. James's Medley. Lord Eustace was concerned with the "Moral and material improvement of the vagabond population frequenting our large cities." The book describes midnight life in London as well as in New York. He also gives a comparison and description of prison discipline in French and English gaols. The book also includes accounts of "A Fortnight in Hayti" and "A Ride in Barbary".

Lord Cecil first purchased a large area of land at Lytchett Heath in 1874 and built a residence, Lytchett Heath House, there in 1875. He then built St Aldhelm's church in 1898 at his sole expense to be used as a private church and to commemorate the Diamond Jubilee of Queen Victoria. It was designed by George Crickmay and dedicated by the Bishop of Salisbury, the Right Rev. John Wordsworth, on 31 May 1898.

Parliament of the United Kingdom
Preceded by Thomas Bramston and John Perry-Watlington	Member of Parliament for South Essex; 1865 – 1868; With: Henry Selwin-Ibbetson	Succeeded by Richard Baker and Andrew Johnston
New constituency	Member of Parliament for West Essex; 1868 – 1885; With: Henry Selwin-Ibbetson	Constituency divided
Military offices
Preceded by Sir Henry Storks	Surveyor-General of the Ordnance; 1874–1880	Succeeded by Sir John Adye
