= John Perry-Watlington =

British Conservative politician

Member of Parliament for South Essex
- In office 7 May 1859 – 22 July 1865 Serving with Thomas William Bramston
- Preceded by: Thomas William Bramston; Richard Wingfield-Baker
- Succeeded by: Henry Selwin-Ibbetson; Eustace Cecil

Personal details
- Born: John Watlington Perry; 7 December 1823 London, England
- Died: 24 February 1882 (aged 58)
- Party: Conservative
- Spouse: Margaret Emily Ethelston (m. 1849)
- Parent(s): Thomas Perry; Maria Jane Watlington

John Watlington Perry-Watlington (7 December 1823 – 24 February 1882), known as John Watlington Perry until 1848, was a British Conservative politician.

Born in London in 1823 as John Watlington Perry, he was the only son of Thomas Perry and Maria Jane, daughter of George Watlington. He was first educated at the Harrow School, before being admitted to Trinity College, Cambridge in Michaelmas of 1841. There, he became a Bachelor of Arts in 1845, and a Master of the Arts in 1849. In 1844, he was admitted to the Inner Temple Four years later he added the additional surname of Watlington, and a year after that he married Margaret Emily, daughter of Reverend Charles W. Ethelston.

Perry-Watlington was first elected Conservative MP for South Essex at the 1859 general election, but stood down at the next election in 1865.

Throughout his life, Perry-Watlington was a Major in the Essex Yeomanry, a Justice of the Peace and Deputy Lieutenant for Essex and Hertfordshire, and, in 1855, the High Sheriff of Essex.

Parliament of the United Kingdom
Preceded by Thomas William Bramston; Richard Wingfield-Baker	Member of Parliament for South Essex; 1859–1865; With: Thomas William Bramston	Succeeded by Henry Selwin-Ibbetson; Eustace Cecil
