= Makins =

Makins is a surname. Notable people with the surname include:

- Ernest Makins (1869–1959), British military officer and politician
- Roger Makins, 1st Baron Sherfield (1904–1996), British Ambassador to the United States
- William Makins (1840–1906), English barrister and politician
- Makins Baronets
