= Barrett-Lennard baronets =

Baronetcy in the Baronetage of the United Kingdom

Barrett-Lennard baronets, of Belhus
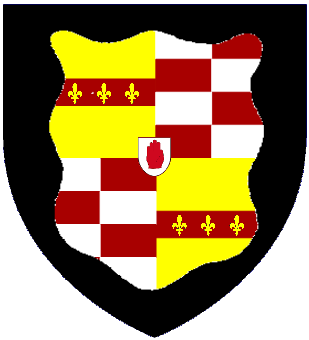
- Motto: Pour bien desirer (The Noble Aim)
- Arms: Quarterly, 1st and 4th, Or on a fesse Gules three Fleur-de-Lis of the first (Lennard); 2nd and 3rd, per pale Argent and Gules Barry of four, counterchanged (Barrett); all within a Bordure wavy Sable
- Crest: Out of a Ducal Coronet Or, an Irish Wolfdog's Head per fesse Argent and Ermine charged with an Escallop, barways nebule Gules and Sable

The Barrett-Lennard Baronetcy, of Belhus in the County of Essex, is a title in the Baronetage of the United Kingdom. It was created on 30 June 1801 for Thomas Barrett-Lennard, subsequently Member of Parliament for Essex South. He was the illegitimate son and testamentary heir of Thomas Barrett-Lennard, 17th Baron Dacre (see Baron Dacre). He was succeeded by his grandson, the second Baronet, the son of Thomas Barrett-Lennard, Member of Parliament for Maldon. His son, the third Baronet, was childless and was succeeded by his younger brother, the fourth Baronet. This line of the family failed on the death in 1977 of his son, the fifth Baronet, who died without male issue. The late Baronet was succeeded by his third cousin once removed, the sixth Baronet. He was the son of Sir Fiennes Cecil Arthur Barrett-Lennard, Chief Justice of Jamaica, son of Captain Thomas George Barrett-Lennard, son of the first marriage of George Barrett-Lennard, son of John Barrett-Lennard, second son of the first Baronet. The sixth Baronet was a Catholic clergyman. As of 2014 the title is held by his second cousin, the seventh Baronet, who succeeded in 2007. He is the grandson of Trenchard Barrett-Lennard, son of the aforementioned George Lennard-Barrett by his second marriage. As of 31 December 2013 the present Baronet has not successfully proven his succession and is therefore not on the Official Roll of the Baronetage, with the baronetcy considered vacant since 2007.

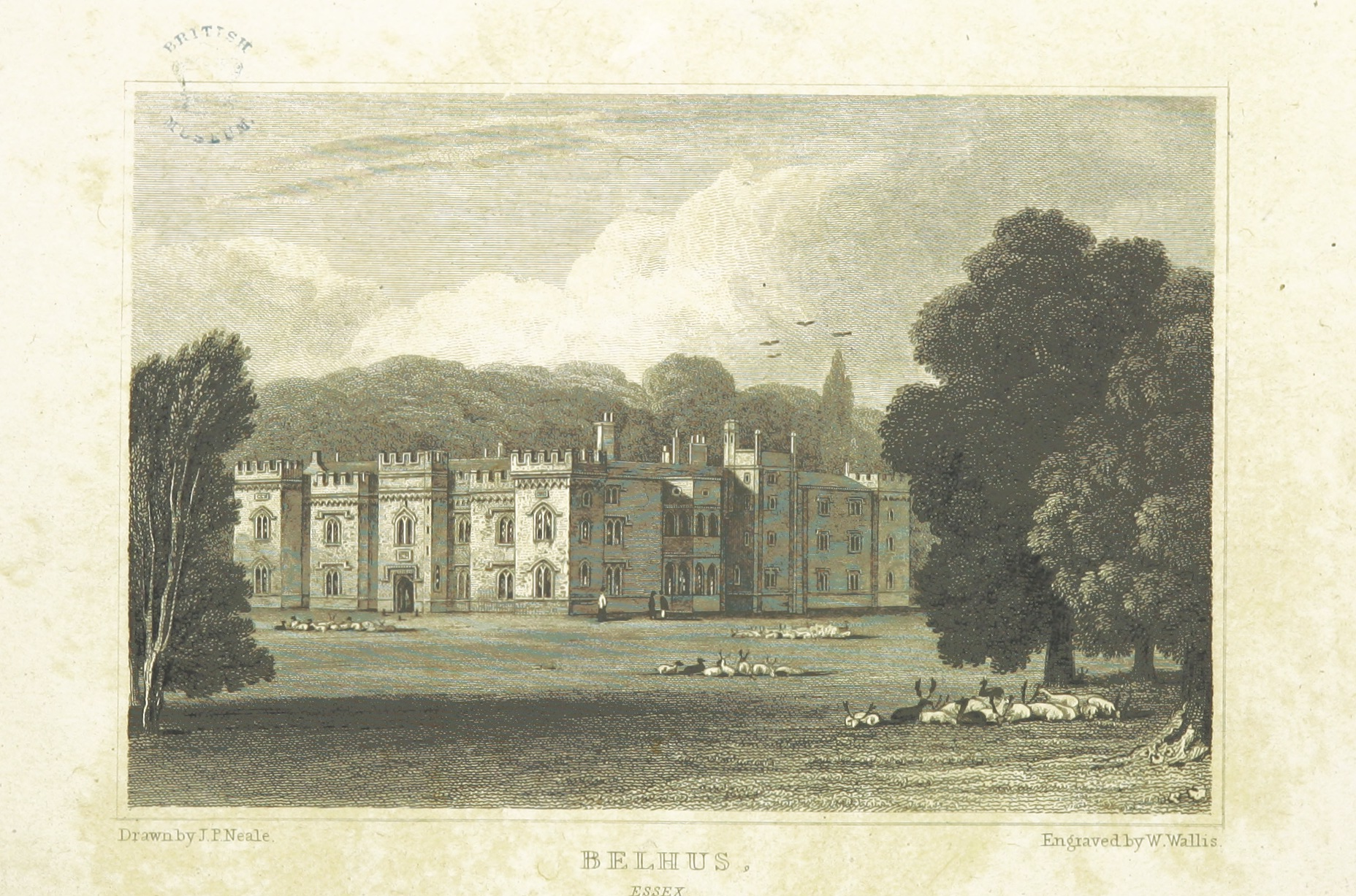
Belhus, Essex (c.1818)

== Barrett-Lennard baronets, of Belhus (1801) ==
- Sir Thomas Barrett-Lennard, 1st Baronet (1761–1857)
- Sir Thomas Barrett-Lennard, 2nd Baronet DL JP (1826–1919)
- Sir Thomas Barrett-Lennard, 3rd Baronet (1853–1923)
- Sir Richard Fiennes Barrett-Lennard, 4th Baronet (1861–1934)
- Sir (Thomas) Richard (Fiennes) Barrett-Lennard, 5th Baronet (1898–1977)
- Sir Hugh Dacre Barrett-Lennard, 6th Baronet (1917–2007)
- Sir Peter John Barrett-Lennard, 7th Baronet (b. 1942 - 2025)

The heir apparent is the present holder's only son Simon James Barrett-Lennard (b. 1980).

== See also ==
- Baron Dacre
- Clones, County Monaghan

== Notes ==
Baronetage of the United Kingdom
Preceded by Baynes baronets	Barrett-Lennard baronets of Belhus; 30 June 1801	Succeeded by de Bathe baronets
