= George Palmer (lieutenant colonel) =

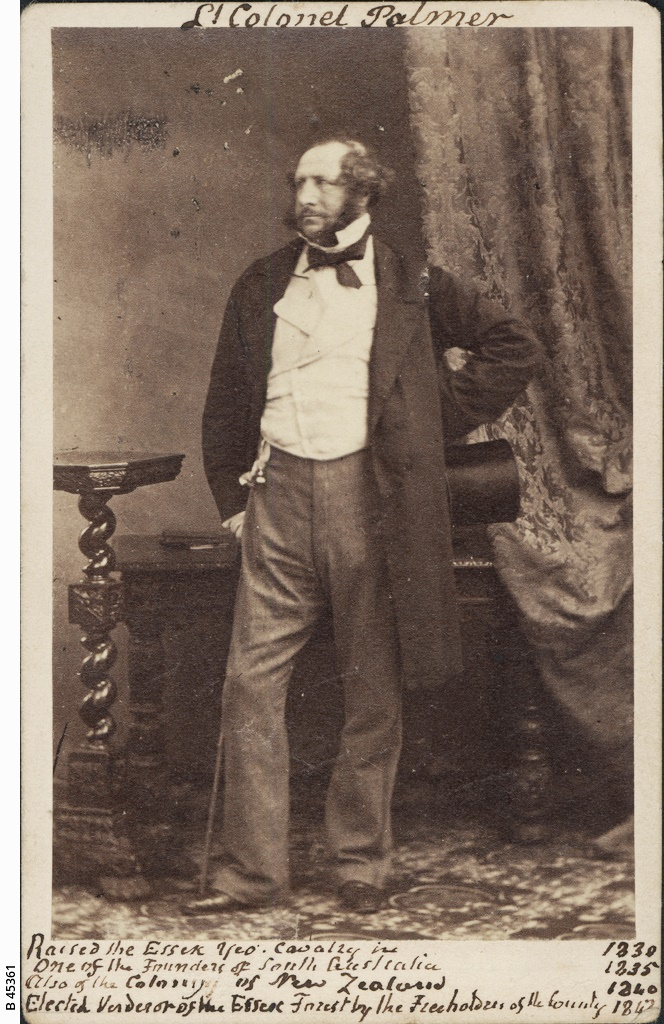
Lt Col George Palmer, c.1870

George Palmer (23 July 1799 – 26 April 1883), also referred to as George Palmer Jnr, was a lieutenant colonel in the Essex Yeomanry, and one of the South Australian Colonisation Commissioners appointed on 5 May 1835.

== Early life ==
Palmer was born on 23 July 1799, as the eldest son of George Palmer, MP for South Essex, and Anna Maria Bund, at Nazeing Park.

== Career ==
According to handwritten notes on a photograph of Palmer in the State Library of South Australia (SLSA), Palmer "raised the West Essex Yeomanry Cavalry in 1830", but a memorial plaque in All Saints' Church in Nazeing gives the date as 1828. He gained the rank of captain in the Essex Yeomanry, later being promoted to lieutenant-colonel.

He was appointed as one of the members of the founding South Australian Colonisation Commission on 5 May 1835, a London-based board created under the South Australia Act 1834 to oversee the sale and leasing of land in South Australia to British subjects.

Palmer and fellow Commissioner Jacob Barrow Montefiore were responsible for fulfilling all of the agents' and other requirements for the "First Fleet of South Australia" in 1836, under the command of Colonel Light. They helped Light to ready the Rapid and Cygnet, the first two ships sent by the Commissioners (the South Australian Company sent the first three ships). As part of the process, the pair trialled a new code for emigrant ships, requiring that a ship's surgeon had to travel on any ship with over 100 passengers. It also specified a minimum deck height. This reform, leading to reduced deaths at sea, was adopted for all British emigrant ships in 1839.

He became a friend of William Light, Surveyor-General of South Australia and planner of the city of Adelaide, and years later, he was responsible for sending a silver bowl to the Mayor and Corporation of the City of Adelaide, as a gift from four friends of Light: Montefiore, Raikes Currie and Alexander Lang Elder, and himself. The bowl was to be used for toasting the memory of Light, a tradition which continues today.

When a wave of unrest swept Britain in the late 1830s, Lt-Col Palmer, whose primary purpose with the Essex Yeomanry at that time was to protect the Waltham Abbey Royal Gunpowder Mills and the Royal Small Arms Factory at Enfield Lock, had to bear the costs of the unit himself from 1838 to 1843. (Note: Note: Initially copied from the Essex Yeomanry article, checked against the DNB source for George Palmer Sr: "For many years he supported at his own cost a corps of yeomanry, and acted as colonel of the corps". However this is likely a mistake, as there is no other mention of a connection to the army for G.P. Sr.)

In 1863 Palmer served as High Sheriff for the county of Essex, and also served as verderer of Epping Forest for many years. There is a sketch of Palmer as Verderer of Epping Forest dated 1871, held in the Print Collection of the New York Public Library.

== Family ==
He married Elizabeth Charlotte Surtees, of Newcastle-upon-Tyne. She died in childbirth aged 42 on 30 July 1848, leaving three sons and a daughter surviving.

== Death and legacy ==
Palmer died on 26 April 1883 at Nazeing. He is referred to as "George Palmer Jnr. Esqre" on the memorial plaque in All Saints' Church.

Palmer Place and Palmer Gardens (now dual-named Pangki-Pangki) in North Adelaide were named after Palmer, as was the town of Palmer in the Mid-Murray region.

== New Zealand Founding ==
According to the note on the SLSA photograph note (see above), Palmer was also involved in the founding of New Zealand in 1840. While his father was on the founding board of the New Zealand Company in 1825, no independent corroboration of George Junior's involvement with New Zealand has been found yet (as of December 2020).
