= Hugh Barrett-Lennard =

- Born: 27 June 1917
- Died: 21 June 2007 (aged 89)
- Education: Radley
- Occupation: Catholic priest

Sir Hugh Dacre Barrett-Lennard, 6th Baronet (27 June 1917 – 21 June 2007) was a Catholic priest. He previously served in the British Army in the Second World War, being mentioned in dispatches and ending the war as a captain. He became a priest of the London Oratory after the war, where he was noted for his eccentricity.

== Early life ==
Barrett-Lennard's father, Sir Fiennes Cecil Arthur Barrett-Lennard, was a British soldier, who fought in the Boer War and in East Africa in the First World War, and became a judge in Malaya, then Johore and Kedah, and finally Chief Justice of Jamaica.

He was educated at Radley College in Oxfordshire. He and his mother converted to Roman Catholicism in the 1930s. He became a teacher at St Philip's prep school in Kensington, and was due to join the London Oratory when the Second World War broke out.

== Second World War ==
On the outbreak of World War II, he enlisted in the British Army as a private in the London Scottish. He was commissioned and joined the Intelligence Corps before being transferred to the 2nd Battalion, Essex Regiment, part of the 56th Independent Infantry Brigade.

After the battalion received severe casualties on 11 June/12 June 1944, shortly after the D-Day landings, he took over the post of battalion Intelligence Officer until August 1944. Very early one morning at the time of the Battle of Falaise, he was responsible for a reconnaissance far into German lines in a jeep with only a driver for support. He was thus able to establish for the 56th Brigade and 49th (West Riding) Infantry Division that the Germans had swiftly retreated and advance was possible.

At the farthest extent of their patrol, they spoke to the local mayor while the Germans packed up and left on the other side of the Mairie. When challenged as to his identity by the mayor, Lt. Barrett-Lennard replied "Je suis L'Armee Britannique!" On return, his driver is reputed to have told all and sundry that Barrett-Lennard was bonkers.

He finished his army career as a captain and had twice been mentioned in dispatches. Two weeks prior to his demobilisation, he was in Berlin, Germany. With the war over, he established a school for soldiers preparing men for their demob and return to civilian life.

== Post-war career ==
Back in London, he joined the London Congregation of the Oratory of St Philip Neri in Knightsbridge. He studied at the Pontifical Beda College in Rome, and was ordained as a Catholic priest at the Basilica of St John Lateran in Rome in 1950, alongside a German that he had shot at in Normandy. After his ordination, he became a parish priest at the London Oratory and became a priest to the Royal House Guards. He was one of the priests suggested by Alec Guinness who could help Laurence Olivier convert to Catholicism.

Father Hugh succeeded to the baronetcy on the death of a distant cousin, Sir Richard Barrett-Lennard, 5th Baronet, at Swallowfield Park, Reading on 28 December 1977.

Father Hugh helped at the Mass said in Bayeux Cathedral for the commemoration of the 50th anniversary of D-Day, in 1994. He also addressed the congregation and unveiled a plaque near the cathedral entrance to the soldiers of the 56th Infantry Brigade–the 2nd Battalions of the Essex Regiment, the Gloucestershire Regiment and the South Wales Borderers–who landed on Gold Beach on 6 June 1944 and pushed inland to secure the right flank of the British Second Army by that evening, liberating Bayeux the following day.

A colleague said of him that he shared "St Philip's eccentricity, especially about dress and those type of things. His family had a certain reputation for a lack of grandeur". He apparently inherited this from his eccentric great grandfather, Sir Thomas Barrett-Lennard, 1st Baronet, who wore very old and shabby clothing and had been mistakenly apprehended by the police as a miscreant and also assumed to be a servant when he opened the park gates to a carriage for which he received a tip.

Father Hugh died a few days before his ninetieth birthday. A Requiem Mass was held at Brompton Oratory on 3 July 2007. He was succeeded in the baronetcy by a distant cousin, although in July 2012 the baronetcy was still regarded as vacant.

== Arms ==
Coat of arms of Hugh Barrett-Lennard
Crest Out of a Ducal Coronet Or, an Irish Wolfdog's Head per fesse Argent and Ermine charged with an Escallop, barways nebule Gules and Sable Escutcheon Quarterly, 1st and 4th, Or on a fesse Gules three Fleur-de-Lis of the first (Lennard); 2nd and 3rd, per pale Argent and Gules Barry of four, counterchanged (Barrett); all within a Bordure wavy Sable Motto Pour bien desirer (The Noble Aim)

== Notes ==
- Leigh Rayment's list of baronets

Baronetage of the United Kingdom
Preceded by Richard Barrett-Lennard	Baronet (of Belhus, Essex); 1977–2007	Succeeded by Richard Fynes Barrett-Lennard
