= Robert Westley Hall-Dare =

English politician, died 1836

Robert Westley Hall-Dare MP

Member of Parliament for South Essex
- In office 1832–1836
- Preceded by: New constituency
- Succeeded by: George Palmer

Personal details
- Born: 3 March 1789 Demerara, The Guianas
- Died: 20 May 1836 (aged 47) London, United Kingdom
- Party: Conservative
- Profession: Politician

Robert Westley Hall-Dare (3 March 1789 – 20 May 1836) was a British Conservative politician who was Member of Parliament for South Essex from 1832, as a Tory, until his death in 1836. He was succeeded by George Palmer.

== Early life ==
He was born Robert Westley Hall in Demerara in modern-day Guyana on 3 March 1789 to parents Robert Westley Hall and Maria Elizabeth De Codin. His parents owned the 'Maria's Pleasure' sugar plantation on Wakenaam Island in the Essequibo River, which passed to Robert on his father's death. Hall was educated at Harrow from 1802 to 1809. He was a Captain in the 23rd Welsh Fusiliers, serving in the West Indies and the Peninsular War.

He married Elizabeth Grafton on 8 November 1815. He changed his name by Royal sign-manual to Robert Westley Hall-Dare on 25 April 1823, taking the name Dare from his wife, daughter and heiress of Marmaduke Grafton Dare.

One of his granddaughters was Mabel Virginia Anna Hall-Dare (Mabel Bent), who in 1877 married the explorer James Theodore Bent.

== Political career ==
Hall-Dare was High Sheriff of Essex in 1821. His merits for public service were spotted by his friend William Jerdan, editor of The Literary Gazette. Hall-Dare was elected MP for South Essex in 1832. In terms of politics, he was described as "opposed to free trade in corn and in everything else; in favour of a repeal of the assessed, and other taxes pressing on the springs of industry, and the imposition in their stead of a tax upon property; and also in favour of an extension of the currency", and a Peelite. He supported the Corn Laws in Parliament, as well as better observance of the Sabbath.

The British Museum has a satirical print (c. 1818) showing Hall-Dare slicing a round pudding representing lands in the county of Essex, labelled 'Ilford to Romford'.

== Death ==
Hall-Dare died at the age of 47 in his house in London, 4 Portman Square. He had nine children. He left his estate in British Guyana to his eldest son, also called Robert Westley Hall-Dare. His mortal remains rest in the family vault in St Mary's Church, Theydon Bois, Essex. Two years before his own death he commissioned a memorial bust for his father, Robert Westley Hall, from the sculptor Patrick Macdowell in St Margaret's Church, Barking, Essex.

Parliament of the United Kingdom
New constituency	Member of Parliament for South Essex; 1832–1836; With: Thomas Barrett-Lennard to 1835; Thomas William Bramston from 1835	Succeeded by George Palmer; Thomas William Bramston
