= Henry Selwin-Ibbetson, 1st Baron Rookwood =

British Conservative politician (1826–1902)

The Right Honourable The Lord Rookwood
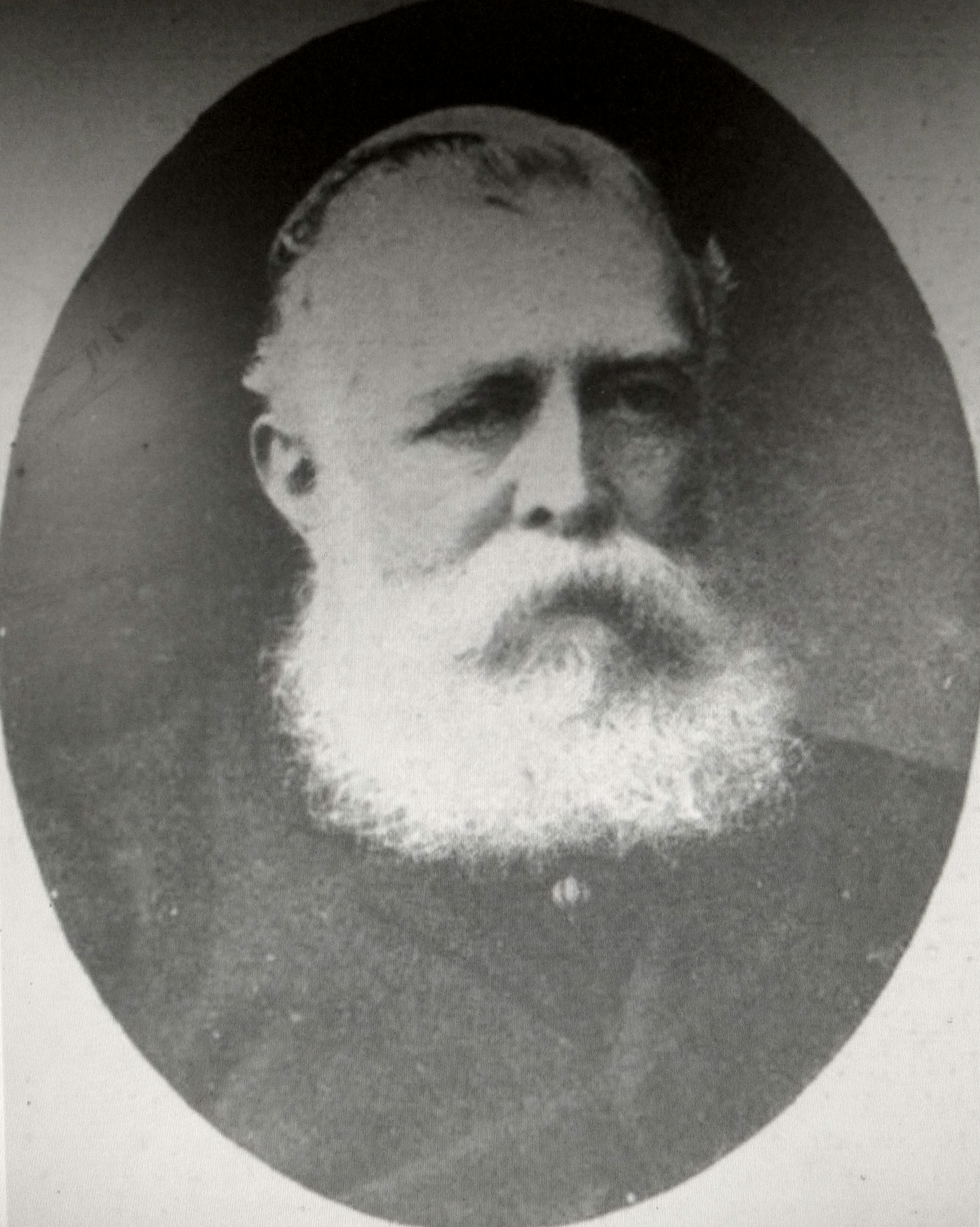
- H.J. Selwin-Ibbetson, Lord Rookwood

Under-Secretary of State for the Home Department
- In office 25 February 1874 – 2 April 1878
- Monarch: Victoria
- Prime Minister: Benjamin Disraeli
- Preceded by: Henry Winterbotham
- Succeeded by: Sir Matthew White Ridley, Bt

Financial Secretary to the Treasury
- In office 2 April 1878 – 21 April 1880
- Monarch: Victoria
- Prime Minister: The Earl of Beaconsfield
- Preceded by: Hon. Frederick Stanley
- Succeeded by: Lord Frederick Cavendish

Personal details
- Born: 26 September 1826
- Died: 15 January 1902 (aged 75)
- Party: Conservative
- Spouse(s): (1) Hon. Sarah Copley (d. 1865) (2) Eden Thackrah (d. 1899) (3) Sophia Lawrell
- Education: St John's College, Cambridge

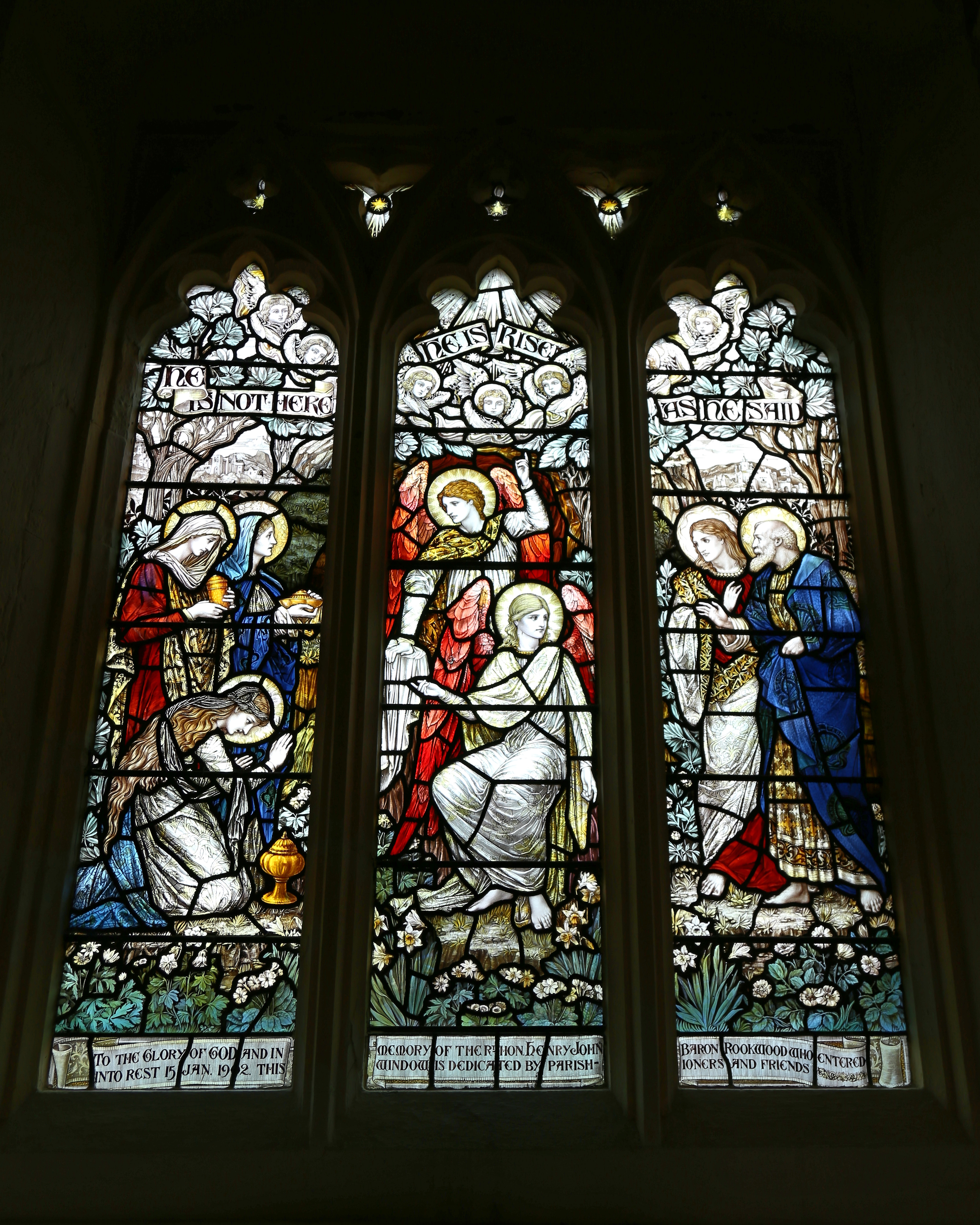
Stained glass window to 1st Baron Rookwood in St Mary's Church, Matching, Essex.

Henry John Selwin-Ibbetson, 1st Baron Rookwood, PC (26 September 1826 – 15 January 1902), known as Sir Henry Selwin-Ibbetson, Bt, from 1869 to 1892, was a British Conservative politician. He served under Benjamin Disraeli as Under-Secretary of State for the Home Department between 1874 and 1878 and as Financial Secretary to the Treasury between 1878 and 1880.

== Background and education ==
Born Henry John Selwin, Rookwood was the only son of Sir John Thomas Selwin, 6th Baronet, and his wife Isabella, daughter of General John Leveson-Gower, and was educated at home and at St John's College, Cambridge where he took his degree in 1849.

== Political career ==
Selwin-Ibbetson unsuccessfully contested Ipswich in 1857 and 1859 but in 1865 he was successfully returned to Parliament as one of two representatives for Essex South. He later represented Essex West from 1868 to 1885 and Epping from 1885 to 1892. In 1867 he resumed by Royal licence the original family surname of Ibbetson in addition to that of Selwin and the following year he succeeded his father in the baronetcy.

When the Conservatives came to power in 1874 under Benjamin Disraeli Rookwood refused the office of Chairman of the Committee of Ways and Means (Deputy Speaker of the House of Commons). Disraeli instead appointed him Under-Secretary of State for the Home Department, a position he held until 1878, and was then Financial Secretary to the Treasury from 1878 to 1880. In 1879 he declined to become Governor of New South Wales. He was later Second Church Estate Commissioner between 1885 and 1886 and 1886 to 1892. On his retirement from the House of Commons in 1892 he was raised to the peerage as Baron Rookwood, of Rookwood Hall and Down Hall, both in the County of Essex. Lord Rookwood "secured Epping Forest for the public".

== Family ==
Lord Rookwood married firstly the Hon. Sarah Elizabeth Copley, eldest daughter and co-heiress of Lord Chancellor John Copley, 1st Baron Lyndhurst, in 1850. After her death in 1865 he married secondly Eden Thackrah, daughter of George Thackrah and widow of his first cousin Sir Charles Henry Ibbetson, 5th Baronet, in 1867. After her death in 1899 he married thirdly Sophia Harriet Lawrell (c. 1841 – 30 July 1932), daughter of Digby Lawrell, in 1900. There were no children from the three marriages.

His estate comprised some 4,000 acres, coal mines in Durham and Yorkshire, and a considerable quantity of house property in Halifax.

Lord Rookwood died in London 15 January 1902, aged 75, when the baronetcy and barony both became extinct.

Parliament of the United Kingdom
Preceded by Thomas William Bramston; John Perry-Watlington	Member of Parliament for Essex South; 1865–1868; With: Lord Eustace Cecil	Succeeded by Richard Wingfield-Baker; Andrew Johnston
New constituency	Member of Parliament for Essex West; 1868–1885; With: Lord Eustace Cecil	Constituency abolished
New constituency	Member of Parliament for Epping; 1885–1892	Succeeded by Amelius Lockwood
Political offices
Preceded by Henry Winterbotham	Under-Secretary of State for the Home Department; 1874–1878	Succeeded by Sir Matthew White Ridley
Preceded by Frederick Stanley	Financial Secretary to the Treasury; 1878–1880	Succeeded by Lord Frederick Cavendish
Church of England titles
Preceded by Evelyn Ashley	Second Church Estates Commissioner; 1885–1886	Succeeded by Thomas Dyke Acland
Preceded by Thomas Dyke Acland	Second Church Estates Commissioner; 1886–1892	Succeeded by Charles Algernon Whitmore
Baronetage of Great Britain
Preceded by John Thomas Selwin	Baronet; 1869–1902	Extinct
Peerage of the United Kingdom
New creation	Baron Rookwood; 1892–1902	Extinct
