= John Barrett-Lennard =

British businessman

Lieutenant-Colonel John Barrett-Lennard, CBE (14 December 1863 – 29 March 1935) was a British soldier and businessman, who was director of Imperial Airways.

He was the son of Walter James Barrett-Lennard and Caroline Dormer. He was the grandson of Sir Thomas Barrett-Lennard, 1st Baronet. He married Mary Emma Gardiner in 1887; they had one son, the Rev. Dacre Barrett-Lennard.

He was lieutenant in the Reserve, but resigned this commission on 3 March 1900. He fought in the Second Boer War and the First World War (9th Bn, Essex Regiment). He was appointed CBE in 1919 and awarded the French Legion of Honour.

In Who's Who he named his recreations as "fishing, golf".
