= George Palmer (South Essex MP) =

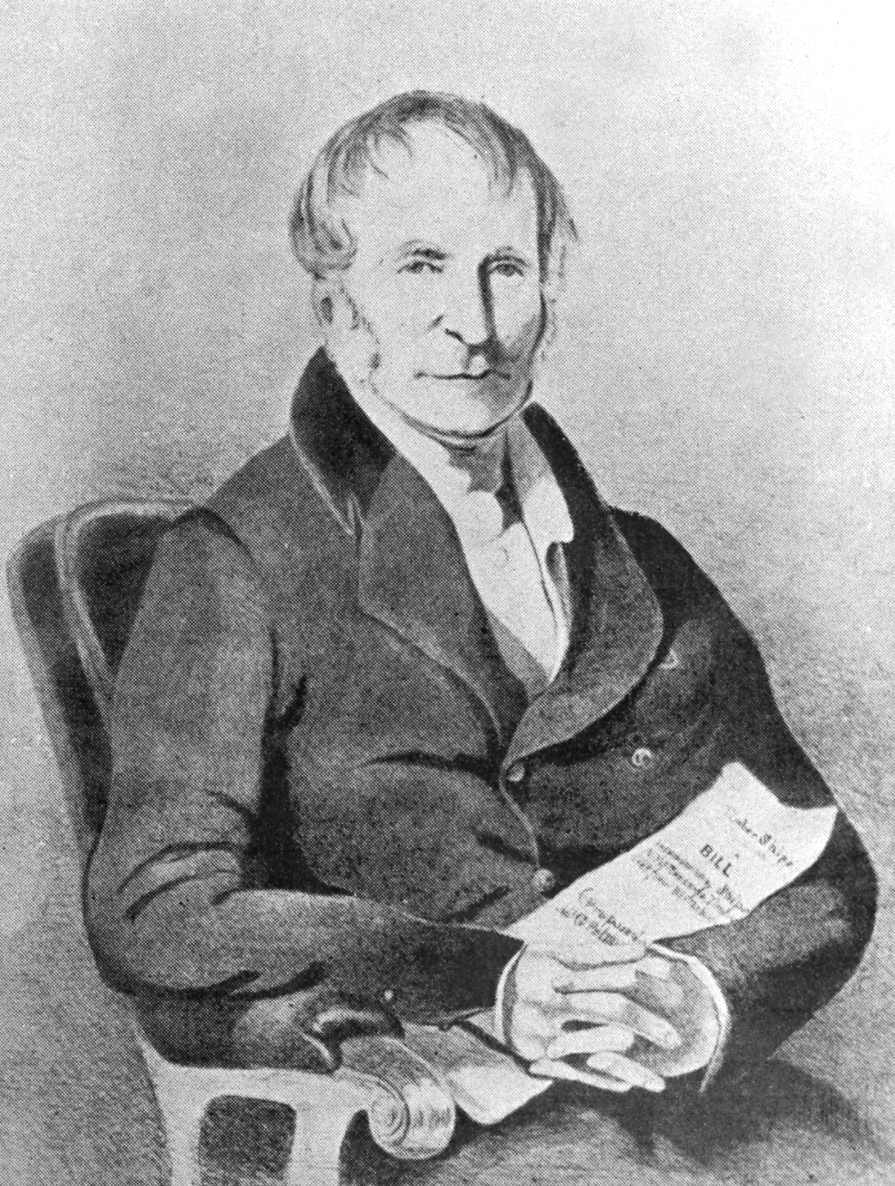
- Drawing of Palmer, c. 1845

Member of Parliament for South Essex
- In office 1836–1847
- Preceded by: Robert Westley Hall-Dare
- Succeeded by: Sir Edward Buxton, 2nd Baronet

Personal details
- Born: 11 February 1772
- Died: 12 May 1853 (aged 81) Nazeing Park, Essex, England
- Party: Conservative
- Children: George Palmer; William Palmer
- Relatives: Roundell Palmer

George Palmer (11 February 1772 – 12 May 1853) was an Bombay Marine officer, businessman, politician and philanthropist.

== Early life ==
Born on 11 February 1772, he was the eldest son of William Palmer (1748?–1821), a London merchant, descended from the Palmers of Wanlip, Leicestershire, and his wife Mary (born 1747), only daughter of John Horsley the rector of Thorley, Hertfordshire, and sister of Samuel Horsley. John Horsley Palmer (Governor of the Bank of England), William Jocelyn Palmer and Sir Ralph Palmer were younger brothers. He was an uncle of Roundell Palmer, 1st Earl of Selborne.

He was educated at Charterhouse School.

== Naval service ==
After leaving school, he joined the Bombay Marine at the age of 14.

Palmer made his first voyage in the East Indiaman Carnatic in 1786. Captain of Boddam in 1796, he received a complimentary letter from the court of directors for his conduct in an encounter with four French frigates. His last voyage was made in 1799, after which he resigned owing to ill-health.

== In business ==
In 1802 Palmer entered into partnership with his father and brother, Horsley Palmer, and Captain Wilson, as East India Company merchants and shipowners at 28 Throgmorton Street, London. In 1831 he was master of the Mercers' Company, and 1832 he was elected chairman of the General Shipowners' Society,

He and his brothers had property interests in Grenada, which used slaves on their Springs, Mount Aire and Upper Latante estates.

== New Zealand Company ==
Palmer was on the founding board of the New Zealand Company in 1825, which was the earliest organised attempt to colonise New Zealand. The board included chair John George Lambton Whig MP and later 1st Earl of Durham), political economist Robert Torrens Senior, Edward Ellice, Edward Littleton, 1st Baron Hatherton, and others, including other East India Company merchants.

== National Lifeboat Institution ==
In 1788 a near-drowning near Macao directed his attention to the equilibrium of boats, and the means of preventing them from sinking. He first became connected with the recently founded Royal National Institution for the Preservation of Life from Shipwreck (now Royal National Lifeboat Institution) in 1826, and his plan of fitting lifeboats was adopted. He designed a new lifeboat, built in the shape of a whaleboat, narrow and pointed at both ends, with special pockets of air built in for buoyancy, which was officially adopted by the Institution in 1828. The design was used for rescue lifeboats placed by the Institution at more than twenty ports, and was used until 1858, when it was superseded by the system of self-righting lifeboats.

Palmer was deputy chairman of the society for over 25 years, and required his own ships to go to sea with the means of saving life. His role was crucial in getting Algernon Percy, 4th Duke of Northumberland appointed as president of the Institution (an office he held from 1851 to 1865, during which he undertook a reorganisation). In February 1853 he resigned his office, when the committee voted him the Gold Medal. In September 2008 this Gold Medal, with unique pendant in the shape of a lifeboat, was sold at auction for £3,200.

== Public life ==
Palmer served as Sheriff of Hertfordshire in 1818. In 1821 he held the office of master of the Mercers' Company, and in that capacity he attended the Lord Mayor at the coronation of George IV on 19 July 1821.

Timber Ships, British North America Act 1840
- Act of Parliament
- Parliament of the United Kingdom
- Long title: An Act for preventing Ships clearing out from a British North American Port loading any Part of their Cargo of Timber of Timber upon Deck.
- Citation: 3 & 4 Vict. c. 36
- Territorial extent: United Kingdom

Dates
- Royal assent: 23 July 1840
- Commencement: 23 July 1840 (Note: The Acts of Parliament (Commencement) Act 1793.)
- Expired: 1 May 1842 (Note: Section 3.)
- Repealed: 7 August 1874

Other legislation
- Repealed by: Statute Law Revision Act 1874 (No. 2)

Status: Repealed

Text of statute as originally enacted

Timber Ships, America Act 1842
- Act of Parliament
- Parliament of the United Kingdom
- Long title: An Act for preventing, until the First Day of May One thousand eight hundred and forty-five, Ships clearing out from any Port in British North America, or in the Settlement of Honduras, from loading any Part of their Cargo of Timber upon Deck.
- Citation: 5 & 6 Vict. c. 17
- Territorial extent: United Kingdom

Dates
- Royal assent: 13 May 1842
- Commencement: 13 May 1842
- Expired: 1 May 1845 (Note: Section 6.)
- Repealed: 7 August 1874

Other legislation
- Amended by: Timber Ships Act 1845
- Repealed by: Statute Law Revision Act 1874 (No. 2)

Status: Repealed

Text of statute as originally enacted

Timber Ships Act 1845
- Act of Parliament
- Parliament of the United Kingdom
- Long title: An Act to make perpetual and amend an Act of the Fifth and Sixth Years of Her present Majesty, for preventing Ships clearing out from any Port in British North America or in the Settlement of Honduras from loading any Part of their Cargo of Timber upon Deck.
- Citation: 8 & 9 Vict. c. 45
- Territorial extent: United Kingdom

Dates
- Royal assent: 21 July 1845
- Commencement: 21 July 1845 (Note: Section 1.)
- Repealed: 4 August 1845

Other legislation
- Amends: Timber Ships, America Act 1842
- Repealed by: Customs (Repeals) Act 1845

Status: Repealed

Text of statute as originally enacted

In 1832, when South Shields became a parliamentary borough, Palmer was a candidate for the Conservative Party, but was not elected. After winning an 1836 by-election for South Essex, Palmer raised the matter of deaths at sea caused by shipwrecks, in Parliament. In April 1839, He chaired a select committee looking at the regulation of timber trading ships crossing the Atlantic Ocean to British North America. The resulting report led to the recommendation that these ships should be barred from carrying loads on their decks. As the Timber Ships Bill, it was discussed first in the Commons (2nd reading, July 1839) and then the House of Lords (July 1840). Changes were first introduced in the Timber Ships, British North America Act 1840, then the Timber Ships, America Act 1842, and then finally the Timber Ships Act 1845, which expanded and finalised legislation which prohibited timber ships from carrying cargo on deck.

Although he had not had experience in agriculture, he vowed to his constituents that he would defend the Corn Laws, and publicly rebuked the Prime Minister Robert Peel when he repealed them.

Palmer sat in Parliament from 1836 to 1847, successful in three strongly-contested elections.

== Death ==
Palmer died at Nazeing Park, Essex, on 12 May 1853.

== Works ==
Palmer was the author of Memoir of a Chart from the Strait of Allass to the Island Bouro, 1799, and of A New Plan for fitting all Boats so that they may be secure as Life Boats at the shortest notice, 1828.

== Family ==
Palmer married, on 29 December 1795, Anna Maria, daughter of William Bund of Wick, Worcestershire, who died on 13 October 1856. They had five children:

- George (23 July 1799 – 1883), a South Australian Colonisation Commissioner and lieutenant colonel in the Essex Yeomanry;
- William, Gresham Professor of Law;
- Francis, born 17 September 1810, also a barrister, 5 May 1837;
- Anna Maria, who died young; and
- Elizabeth, who, in 1830, married Robert Biddulph, M.P.
