= Richard Barrett-Lennard =

British banker (1898–1977)

Sir Thomas Richard Fiennes Barrett-Lennard, 5th Baronet, OBE, CStJ (12 December 1898 – 28 December 1977) was a British banker who had served as vice-chairman of Norwich Union and Chairman of the East Anglian Trustee Savings Bank.

== Life and family ==
He was born in Brighton on 12 December 1898, the son of Richard Fiennes Barrett-Lennard, 4th Baronet. He entered Clare College, Cambridge in 1919, obtaining a BA degree. He married Miss Una Kathleen Finora Fitzgerald at Aveley in July, 1922 He was appointed as a Justice of the Peace for Essex in October, 1926. He inherited the baronetcy on the death of his father at Horsford manor in September, 1934.

He worked in the financial services industry, being vice-chairman of Norwich Union, Chairman of the East Anglian Trustee Savings Bank. and a director of other insurance companies In 1950, he was chairman of the appeal committee that raised £35,000 for repairs to Norwich Cathedral.

He died on 28 Dec. 1977 and was succeeded in the baronetcy by his distant cousin, Sir Hugh Barrett-Lennard, 6th Baronet, who was descended from the second son of the first baronet.

== Family pictures ==
Barrett-Lennard owned a number of family pictures which he loaned to various exhibitions, including Fine Paintings from East Anglia and 18th Century Italy and the Grand Tour. His paintings were photographed and a list published by the Courtauld Institute of Art. In 1974 he donated many of these family pictures to Essex County Council, although they remained with the family until 2009. The collection included around 40 family portraits, including the donor, painted by Armin Horowitz in 1938. There were also some topographical paintings of Belhus and a few other works. A few paintings from the collection are on display in the search room at the Essex Record Office, including a portrait of the 5th Baronet. In 1922, the collection included portraits of Charles I and Catherine Mildmay, both by Cornelis Janssens van Ceulen, but these are not included in the Essex Record Office List.

The most valuable item in the collection was a portrait of Thomas Barrett-Lennard, 17th Lord Dacre, with his wife and daughter by Pompeo Batoni which was valued at £2.5m. The Batoni portrait and many other works in the collection were discussed in a privately published family history.

== Honours ==
- Officer of the Order of the British Empire (1950)
- Commander of the Venerable Order of Saint John (1955)

Coat of arms of Richard Barrett-Lennard
Crest Out of a Ducal Coronet Or, an Irish Wolfdog's Head per fesse Argent and Ermine charged with an Escallop, barways nebule Gules and Sable Escutcheon Quarterly, 1st and 4th, Or on a fesse Gules three Fleur-de-Lis of the first (Lennard); 2nd and 3rd, per pale Argent and Gules Barry of four, counterchanged (Barrett); all within a Bordure wavy Sable Motto Pour bien desirer (The Noble Aim)

Baronetage of the United Kingdom
Preceded by Richard Fiennes Barrett-Lennard	Baronet (of Belhus, Essex); 1934–1977	Succeeded by Hugh Barrett-Lennard
