= Andrew Johnston (English politician) =

British politician

Andrew Johnston (23 May 1835 – 28 February 1922) was a Liberal Party politician in England.

== Life ==
Johnston was the son of the abolitionist Priscilla (born Buxton) and Andrew Johnston, MP of Holton Halesworth, Sussex, Member of Parliament for Anstruther Easter and St Andrews Burghs. He was educated at Rugby School and University College, Oxford.

Andrew junior was elected at the 1868 general election as a Member of Parliament (MP) for the Southern division of Essex, one of two Liberals elected unopposed in the first election after the county had been restructured by the Representation of the People Act 1867 from two divisions to four.

Faced with a contest at the 1874 general election, Johnston was the lowest placed of four candidates, and both seats were won by Conservative Party candidates. He did not stand for Parliament again.

Defeat in Parliament allowed him to concentrate on Essex affairs. He was appointed Justice of the Peace in 1866, and served as High Sheriff of Essex for 1880–81. When the Essex County Council was set up in 1889, he was unanimously elected its first chairman, an office he occupied well into advanced years, resigning only in 1916. His service of 27 years in the chair has never been equalled, and his portrait holds pride of place in Committee Room no2 of the present council.

In private life, Johnston married Charlotte Ann, the daughter of the Rev. George Trevalyan. They had one daughter, who died in childhood. Johnston was a keen exponent of teetotalism, and founded the Wilfrid Lawson Temperance Hotel at Woodford, where he lived. He was a verderer of Epping Forest 1878–1887.

He died on 28 February 1922, and at his funeral service, the Bishop of Chelmsford said he was a "man who was what he appeared to be, and appeared to be what he was".

The amplest account of his later life is to be found in Richard Morris, The Verderers and Courts of Waltham Forest in the County of Essex 1250-2000, Loughton 2004.

Parliament of the United Kingdom
Preceded by Henry Selwin-Ibbetson; Lord Eustace Cecil	Member of Parliament for South Essex; 1868–1874; With: Richard Baker	Succeeded by Thomas Charles Baring; William Makins
