= West Essex (constituency) =

Parliamentary constituency in the United Kingdom, 1868–1885

- Former county constituency for the House of Commons
- County: Essex

1868–1885
- Seats: Two
- Created from: North Essex; South Essex
- Replaced by: Saffron Walden; Chelmsford; Epping

West Essex, formally known as the West Division of Essex was a parliamentary constituency in the English county of Essex. From 1868 to 1885, it returned two Members of Parliament (MPs) to the House of Commons of the Parliament of the United Kingdom, using the bloc vote system of election.

== History and boundaries ==
West Essex was created by the Reform Act 1867 for the 1868 general election as one of three two-member divisions of Essex (East, South and West), replacing the two divisions which had been created by the Reform Act 1832 (Northern and Southern). Initially named as the North West Division, it was renamed the West Division under the Boundaries Act 1868. The seat was created from parts of both South Essex and North Essex.

The boundaries were defined as:

- The Hundreds of Freshwell, Uttlesford, Clavering, Dunmow, Harlow, Waltham, Ongar, and Chelmsford.

The first four of these hundreds had been part of the abolished Northern division, with the remainder transferred from the Southern Division.

See map on Vision of Britain website.

Under the Redistribution of Seats Act 1885, the three two-member divisions of Essex were abolished and replaced by eight single-member divisions. West Essex was replaced by the Epping Division and parts of the Saffron Walden and Chelmsford Divisions.

== Members of Parliament ==
The constituency was represented throughout its existence by the same two MPs, both of whom were Conservatives.

Election	Member	Party	Member	Party
1868	Lord Eustace Cecil	Conservative	Sir Henry Selwin-Ibbetson	Conservative
1874	Lord Eustace Cecil	Conservative	Sir Henry Selwin-Ibbetson	Conservative
1880	Lord Eustace Cecil	Conservative	Sir Henry Selwin-Ibbetson	Conservative
1885	Constituency abolished. See Saffron Walden and Chelmsford			

== Election results ==
General election 1868: Essex Western
Party	Candidate	Votes	%	±%
Conservative	Henry Selwin-Ibbetson	Unopposed		
Conservative	Eustace Cecil	Unopposed		
Registered electors		5,479		
Conservative win (new seat)				
Conservative win (new seat)				

General election 1874: Essex Western
Party	Candidate	Votes	%	±%
Conservative	Henry Selwin-Ibbetson	Unopposed		
Conservative	Eustace Cecil	Unopposed		
Registered electors		5,889		
Conservative hold				
Conservative hold				

The only contested election in Western Essex was in 1880, when the former King's Lynn MP Sir Thomas Buxton failed to win a seat for the Liberal Party.

General election 1880: Essex Western
Party	Candidate	Votes	%	±%
Conservative	Henry Selwin-Ibbetson	2,664	39.0	N/A
Conservative	Eustace Cecil	2,397	35.1	N/A
Liberal	Thomas Buxton	1,772	25.9	New
Majority		625	9.2	N/A
Turnout		4,436 (est)	77.4	N/A
Registered electors		5,732		
Conservative hold		Swing	N/A	
Conservative hold		Swing	N/A	

== Sources ==
- Leigh Rayment's Historical List of MPs – Constituencies beginning with "E" (part 2)

Parliament of the United Kingdom
Preceded by North Essex	UK Parliament constituency 1868 – 1885	Succeeded by Saffron Walden
Preceded by North Essex	UK Parliament constituency 1868 – 1885	Succeeded by Chelmsford
