= Baron Rookwood =

Extinct barony in the Peerage of the United Kingdom

Baron Rookwood, of Rookwood Hall and Down Hall both in the County of Essex, was a title in the Peerage of the United Kingdom. It was created on 15 June 1892 for the Conservative politician Sir Henry Selwin-Ibbetson, 7th Baronet. He was Under-Secretary of State for the Home Department from 1874 to 1878 and Financial Secretary to the Treasury from 1878 to 1880. The Ibbetson family descended from Samuel Ibbetson, a Leeds cloth merchant who founded the family trading firm that generated great wealth in following centuries. His descendant Henry Ibbetson raised a force of 100 men at his own expense during the Jacobite rising of 1745 and served as High Sheriff of Yorkshire in 1746. In 1748 he was created a Baronet, of Leeds in the County of York in the Baronetage of Great Britain. He was succeeded by his son, the second Baronet. He married Jane, daughter of John Caygill and his wife Jane Selwin. On his death the title passed to his son, the third Baronet. He was High Sheriff of Yorkshire in 1803.

He died childless and was succeeded by his younger brother, the fourth Baronet. In 1817 he assumed by sign manual the surname of Selwin in lieu of Ibbetson. However, after succeeding in the baronetcy in 1825 he resumed by sign manual the surname of Ibbetson in addition to that of Selwin. When he died the title passed to his son, the fifth Baronet. He was childless and was succeeded by his uncle, the sixth Baronet. In 1825 he assumed by sign manual the surname of Selwin in lieu of Ibbetson. On his death the title passed to his only son, the aforementioned seventh Baronet, who was elevated to the peerage in 1892. In 1868 he assumed by Royal licence the additional surname of Ibbetson. Lord Rookwood was childless and on his death on 15 January 1902 both the baronetcy and barony became extinct.

== Ibbetson baronets, of Leeds (1748) ==
Escutcheon of the Ibbetson Baronets

- Sir Henry Ibbetson, 1st Baronet (c. 1706–1761)
- Sir James Ibbetson, 2nd Baronet (c. 1747–1795)
- Sir Henry Carr Ibbetson, 3rd Baronet (c. 1769–1825)
- Sir Charles Selwin-Ibbetson, 4th Baronet (1779–1839)
- Sir Charles Henry Ibbetson, 5th Baronet (1814–1861)
- Sir John Thomas Selwin, 6th Baronet (c. 1784–1869)
- Sir Henry John Selwin-Ibbetson, 7th Baronet (1826–1902) (created Baron Rookwood in 1892)

== Barons Rookwood (1892) ==
- Henry John Selwin-Ibbetson, 1st Baron Rookwood (1826–1902)

== Notes ==
Baronetage of Great Britain
Preceded by Lawrence baronets	Ibbetson baronets of Leeds; 12 May 1748	Succeeded by Vanneck baronets

}
