= Fiennes Barrett-Lennard =

Sir Fiennes Cecil Arthur Barrett-Lennard (2 April 1880 – 26 January 1963) was a British colonial judge and soldier.

== Family ==
Barrett-Lennard was the son of Captain Thomas George Barrett-Lennard (great-grandson of Sir Thomas Barrett-Lennard, 1st Baronet) and Edith Mackenzie. He married Winifrede Mignon Berlyn in 1916. They had one son, Hugh, who subsequently inherited the Barrett-Lennard baronetcy.

== Career ==
Barret-Lennard was appointed as one of the Puisne Judges of the Supreme Court of the Gold Coast (later Ghana) in 1913. He was subsequently a judge in the Straits Settlement. He was appointed Chief Justice of Jamaica in 1925 and was knighted in the 1926 Birthday Honours.

As Chief Justice, in 1929, he ordered the confiscation of the property of the Universal Negro Improvement Association (UNIA) which had been founded by black activist, Marcus Garvey. He retired in 1932 and after retiring, he claimed his retirement was forced on him by ill health that resulted from having been poisoned.

He returned to London, becoming a lecturer at Birkbeck College and wrote a paper on colonial law published in the Transactions of the Grotius Society.
