= William Makins =

English politician and barrister

Sir William Thomas Makins, 1st Baronet DL (16 March 1840 – 2 February 1906) was a barrister and Conservative politician.

Makins was the eldest son of Charles Makins of St. Mark's, Woodhouse, Leeds. He was educated at Harrow School, and at Trinity College, Cambridge. He was called to the bar at Middle Temple in 1862 and went on the Midland Circuit. His directorships included the Great Eastern Railway, and the Gas Light and Coke Company. He was appointed Lieutenant-Colonel of the 3rd (Stratford) Essex Artillery Volunteer Corps in 1869 and was Honorary Colonel of the unit and its successors from 23 April 1874. He was also a J.P. for Oxfordshire and Essex, and a Deputy Lieutenant for Essex and the City of London'

Makins stood unsuccessfully for parliament at Kidderminster in 1868. In 1874 he was elected Member of Parliament for South Essex. He held the seat until the Redistribution of Seats Act 1885 when he was elected for South East Essex. In 1886, he was elected instead at Walthamstow and held the seat until 1892. He was created baronet of Rotherfield Court, Henley-on-Thames in 1902, as part of King Edward VII's Birthday Honours.

Makins died at the age of 65.

Makins married Elizabeth Simpson in 1861. Their daughter Mary married Sir Eugene Clauson, and their third son Paul succeeded to the baronetcy and became Lord Lieutenant of Oxfordshire.

Parliament of the United Kingdom
Preceded by Richard Baker; Andrew Johnston	Member of Parliament for South Essex; 1874–1885; With: Thomas Charles Baring	Constituency abolished
New constituency	Member of Parliament for South East Essex; 1885–1886	Succeeded by Carne Rasch
Preceded by Edward Buxton	Member of Parliament for Walthamstow; 1886–1892	Succeeded by Edmund Widdrington Byrne
Baronetage of the United Kingdom
New creation	Baronet of Rotherfield Court; 1903–1906	Succeeded by Paul Makins
