= Makins baronets =

Extinct baronetcy in the Baronetage of the United Kingdom

The Makins Baronetcy, of Rotherfield Court in Henley-on-Thames in the County of Oxford, was a title in the Baronetage of the United Kingdom. It was created on 9 January 1903 for William Makins, Member of Parliament for South Essex, South East Essex and Walthamstow. The title became extinct on the death of the fourth Baronet in 1999.

Another member of the Makins family was Roger Makins, 1st Baron Sherfield. He was the grandson of Henry Francis Makins, younger brother of Sir William Makins, 1st Baronet.

== Makins baronets, of Rotherfield Court (1903) ==
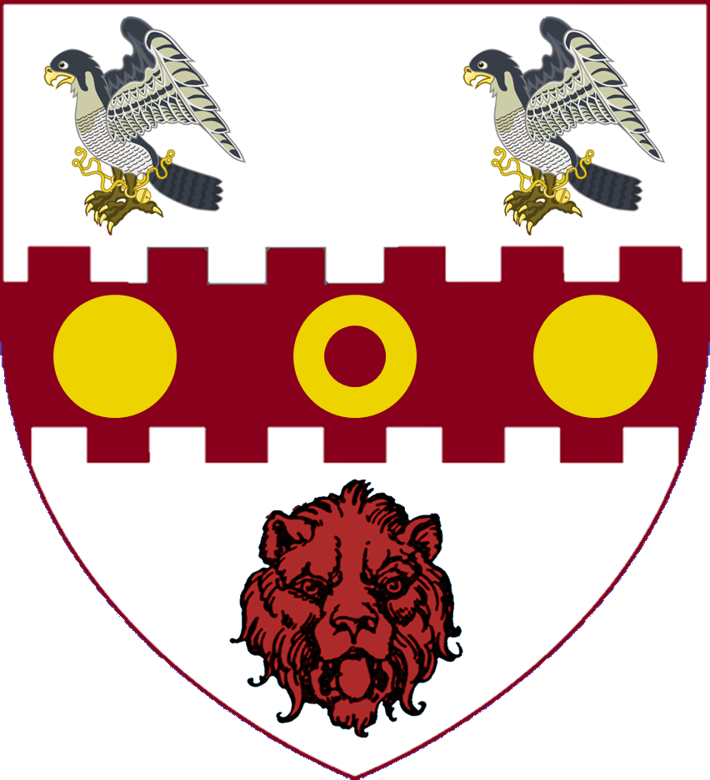
Escutcheon of the Makins baronets of Rotherfield Court

- Sir William Thomas Makins, 1st Baronet (1840–1906)
- Sir Paul Augustine Makins, 2nd Baronet (1871–1939)
- Sir William Vivian Makins, 3rd Baronet (1903–1969)
- Sir Paul Vivian Makins, 4th Baronet (1913–1999), who left no heir.

== See also ==
- Baron Sherfield

== Notes ==
Baronetage of the United Kingdom
| Preceded by Prevost baronets | Makins baronets of Rotherfield Court; 9 January 1903 | Succeeded by Arthur baronets |
