= William Palmer (barrister) =

William Palmer (1802–1858) was an English barrister, known as a legal writer and Gresham Professor of Law.

== Life ==
The second son of George Palmer of Nazeing Park, Essex, by Anna Maria, daughter of William Bund of Wick Episcopi, Worcestershire, he was born on 9 November 1802. He matriculated at St. Mary Hall, Oxford, on 16 February 1822, graduated B.A. in 1825, and proceeded M.A. in 1828.

In May 1830 Palmer was called to the bar at the Inner Temple, where he acquired a large practice as a conveyancer. In 1836 he was appointed to the professorship of civil law at Gresham College, which he held until his death on 24 April 1858. He did not marry.

== Works ==
Palmer wrote:

- An Inquiry into the Navigation Laws, London, 1833.
- Discourse on the Gresham Foundation; or two introductory Lectures delivered at the Royal Exchange, London, 1837.
- The Law of Wreck considered with a View to its Amendment, London, 1843.
- Principles of the Legal Provision for the Relief of the Poor. Four lectures partly read at Gresham College in Hilary Term 1844, London, 1844.

== Notes ==
Attribution

This article incorporates text from a publication now in the public domain: Lee, Sidney, ed. (1895). "Palmer, William (1802-1858)". Dictionary of National Biography. Vol. 43. London: Smith, Elder & Co.
