= Thomas Charles Baring =

British politician (1831–1891)

Member of Parliament for South Essex
- In office 1874–1885
- Succeeded by: Constituency abolished

Member of Parliament for the City of London
- In office 1887–1891

Personal details
- Born: 16 May 1831
- Died: 2 April 1891 (aged 59)
- Party: Conservative
- Spouse: Susan Minturn
- Children: 7
- Parent(s): Charles Baring; Mary Ursula Sealy
- Education: Harrow School
- Alma mater: Wadham College, Oxford
- Occupation: Banker, politician, author

Thomas Charles Baring DL (16 May 1831 – 2 April 1891) was a British banker and Conservative Party politician.

== Life ==
Baring, informally called "T. C." or "Charley" to distinguish him from the other Thomases in the Baring family, was the son of the Right Reverend Charles Baring, Bishop of Durham, younger son of Sir Thomas Baring, 2nd Baronet. His mother was Mary Ursula, daughter of Charles Sealy. He was educated at Harrow and Wadham College, Oxford, before becoming a partner in the family firm of Baring Brothers & Co. In 1874 Baring gave £30,000 to enable Magdalen Hall in Oxford to be refounded as Hertford College, Oxford by means of an act of parliament. He entered Parliament for Essex South in 1874, a seat he held until 1885, and later represented the City of London from 1887 to 1891. Baring also served as a Justice of the Peace for Essex, Middlesex, London and Westminster, was a member of the Royal Commission on Loss of Life at Sea from 1885 to 1887, and the author of among other works Pindar in English Rhyme and The Scheme of Epicurus: A Rendering into English Verse of the Unfinished Poem of Lucretius Entitled, De Rerum Natura. With Barings facing bankruptcy following the Panic of 1890, he returned to business life to help reorganize the partnership as a limited liability company, and served as one of its Managing Directors until his death.

Baring married Susan, daughter of Robert Bowne Minturn, of New York City, in 1859. They had four sons and three daughters (of whom two sons never reached adulthood). He died in April 1891, aged 59. His wife survived him by six years and died in January 1897.

== See also ==
- Baron Northbrook

== Notes ==
Parliament of the United Kingdom
Preceded by Richard Baker; Andrew Johnston	Member of Parliament for Essex South; 1874–1885; With: William Thomas Makins	Constituency abolished
Preceded by John Hubbard; Sir Robert Fowler	Member of Parliament for the City of London; 1887–1891; With: Sir Robert Fowler	Succeeded by Sir Robert Fowler; Hucks Gibbs
