= Essex Yeomanry =

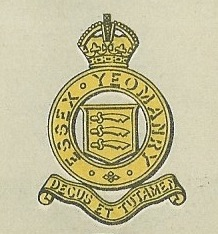
- Essex Yeomanry cap badge (1940s)
- Active: 1797–1828; 10 February 1831 – 31 March 1877; 13 February 1902–present
- Country: Kingdom of Great Britain (1797–1800); United Kingdom (1801–Present)
- Branch: Army Reserve
- Type: Yeomanry
- Role: Signals
- Size: Squadron
- Garrison/HQ: Colchester
- Mottos: Decus et Tutamen (Shield and Protection) – 1831–77; 1909 onwards Audacter et Sincere (Gallant and Loyal) – 1901–09
- March: The Coggeshall Man's Wedding
- Engagements: World War I Battle of Frezenberg Battle of Arras Hundred Days Offensive World War II North African Campaign Italian Campaign Burma Campaign North West Europe Campaign

Commanders
- Honorary Colonel: Colonel Timothy J.S. Allen, OBE
- Notable commanders: John Archer-Houblon; George Palmer; Richard Colvin; Reginald Hobbs

The Essex Yeomanry was a Reserve unit of the British Army that originated in 1797 as local Yeomanry Cavalry Troops in Essex. Reformed after the experience gained in the Second Boer War, it saw active service as cavalry in World War I and as artillery in World War II. Its lineage is maintained by 36 (Essex Yeomanry) Signal Squadron, part of 71 (Yeomanry) Signal Regiment, Royal Corps of Signals.

== History ==
=== French Revolutionary and Napoleonic Wars ===
After Britain was drawn into the French Revolutionary Wars, the government of prime minister William Pitt the Younger proposed on 14 March 1794 that the counties should form Corps of Yeomanry Cavalry that could be called on by the King to defend the country against invasion or by the Lord Lieutenant to subdue any civil disorder within the county. Prominent landowners came forward to recruit the new force. The first Troop of Yeomanry in Essex was formed in 1797 by John Conyers of Copped Hall near Epping. The 2nd Troop was recruited in the Chelmsford district in February 1798 by William Tufnell of Langleys at Great Waltham, and the 3rd Troop was raised in March by John Archer-Houblon of Great Hallingbury. By the end of May that year there were 15 Troops across Essex, with an establishment of 640 men.

In 1803, when the short-lived Peace of Amiens broke down and the Napoleonic Wars began, there was a resurgence in recruiting for the Yeomanry, and by December that year there were 23 Troops in Essex, with a strength of 1251 men. The largest was the 5th Troop raised at Harlow by Montagu Burgoyne, which had 160 men. By 1813 the threat from France had disappeared and the Yeomanry were in decline: the number of Troops in Essex had fallen to 12. The government suggested that the independent Troops should be regimented, and in February seven of the Essex Troops became the 1st Essex Yeomanry Cavalry under the command of Lieutenant-Colonel Archer-Houblon. The remaining Troops continued as parts of independent units:

- 1st Squadron of Essex Yeomanry Cavalry (Captain Conyers)
- Essex Union Legion Cavalry (Lt-Col Burgoyne)
- Havering Yeomanry Cavalry (Major Crosse)
- 1st East Essex Cavalry (Capt Bawtree)

=== 19th Century ===
After the Battle of Waterloo the Yeomanry were kept in being in case of civil disorder, but there was little unrest in Essex and by 1827 only four Troops remained in the county, with a strength of just 120. When Government support for the Yeomanry was withdrawn in 1828 the Tufnell Troop was the last to be disbanded. However, just two years later a wave of unrest swept the country and the government restored Yeomanry pay for drills and periods of service in aid of the civil power. George Palmer of Nazeing Park raised a new Troop known as the West Essex Corps of Yeomanry Cavalry, whose primary purpose was to protect the Waltham Abbey Royal Gunpowder Mills and the Royal Small Arms Factory at Enfield Lock. From 1838 to 1843 Lt-Col Palmer had to bear the costs of the unit himself. It eventually grew to five Troops as the West Essex Regiment of Yeomanry Cavalry:

- A Troop (Capt Jessopp) at Waltham Abbey
- B Troop (Maj J.W.P. Watlington) at Harlow
- C Troop (Capt the Hon Francis Petre) from the estates of Lord Petre
- D Troop (Light Artillery) (Capt S. Bolton Edenborough of Thrift Hall) at Waltham Abbey
- E Troop (Light Artillery)

Lieutenant-Col Palmer retired from the command in 1868 and was followed by a series of commanding officers (COs) in quick succession. In 1871 the declining unit reverted to its old title of Essex Yeomanry Cavalry. The government ordered the disbandment of the artillery troops in 1876, and when there were only 46 men on parade in September that year it ordered the CO, Lt-Col T. Duff Cater, to wind up the whole unit. It was disbanded on 31 March 1877.

Yeomanry activity in the county did not entirely disappear: Captain Richard Colvin raised an Essex Troop of the Loyal Suffolk Hussars in 1889.

=== Imperial Yeomanry ===
Following a string of defeats during Black Week in early December 1899, the British government realised that it would need more troops than just the regular army to fight the Second Boer War. On 13 December, the decision to allow volunteer forces to serve in South Africa was made, and a Royal Warrant was issued on 24 December. This officially created the Imperial Yeomanry (IY). The force was organised as county service companies of approximately 115 men signed up for one year, and volunteers from the Yeomanry and civilians (usually middle and upper class) quickly filled the new force, which was equipped to operate as Mounted infantry. The Loyal Suffolk Hussars raised the 43rd and 44th (Suffolk) Companies, including volunteers from the Essex Troop. These two companies, which landed in South Africa on 23 February and 28 March respectively, served in 12th Battalion, IY. In addition, Capt (now Lt-Col) Colvin of the Essex Troop commanded the 20th (Rough Riders) Battalion IY, which was raised on 17 March 1900 in the City of London and landed in South Africa on 3 May. The First Contingent of the Imperial Yeomanry completed their year's term of service in 1901, and Lt-Col Colvin was Mentioned in dispatches and awarded a Companionship of the Bath (CB)

The Imperial Yeomanry concept was considered a success and before the war ended the existing Yeomanry regiments at home were converted into Imperial Yeomanry, and new regiments raised, including the Essex Imperial Yeomanry. The Lord Lieutenant of Essex, the Earl of Warwick (who became the unit's Honorary Colonel), appointed Lt-Col Colvin to raise and command the new regiment. Colvin arranged the squadrons on the basis of fox hunts in the county, giving the following organisation:

- Regimental Headquarters (RHQ) (Maj John Patterson, DSO, former captain in the IY, as adjutant) at 17 Sir Isaac's Walk, Colchester
- A Squadron (Maj Henry Lermitte, retired captain in the Royal Scots Fusiliers) at Colchester, with detachments at High Street, Harwich, Marine Hall, Old Pier Street, Walton-on-the-Naze, Ardleigh and Clacton-on-Sea (No 4 Trp HQ at Warwick Castle Hotel, drill hall at Osborne Hotel) – from the Essex and Suffolk Hunt
- B Squadron (Maj Edmund Deacon, retired lieutenant in the King's Dragoon Guards (KDG)) at Drill Hall, Victoria Street, Braintree, with detachments at Queen's Hall, 47 New Street, Halstead, Chelmsford and Tiptree – from the East Essex Hunt
- C Squadron (Maj Leonard Pelly, former lieutenant in the 20th (Rough Riders) Bn, IY) at Honey Lane, Waltham Abbey, with detachments at Forest Road, Loughton, Bishop's Stortford (Hertfordshire) and Great Dunmow – from the Essex Hunt
- D Squadron (Maj Francis Whitmore of Orsett Hall, formerly of the 1st Essex Artillery Volunteers) at Drill Hall, East Street, Southend-on-Sea, with detachments at Drill Hall, Ongar Road, Brentwood, Artillery Drill Hall, Brook Road, Grays, Stratford and Orsett – from the Essex Union Hunt
- Machine Gun Section
- Honorary Chaplain: Henry Johnson, Bishop of Colchester (former Cornet in the 1st Royal Dragoons)

The Boer War was still going on, and further volunteers went out to South Africa with the second contingent of the IY. Major J.H. Patterson, DSO, of the Essex IY, was appointed Temporary Lt-Col to command the 33rd Battalion on 17 January 1902.

=== Territorial Force ===
The Imperial Yeomanry were subsumed into the new Territorial Force (TF) under the Haldane Reforms of 1908. The regiment simply dropped 'Imperial' from the title and was designated as Dragoons. Lieutenant-Col Colvin handed over command of the regiment to Lt-Col 'Ned' Deacon in February 1911.

=== World War I ===
In accordance with the Territorial and Reserve Forces Act 1907 (7 Edw. 7, c.9), which brought the Territorial Force into being, the TF was intended to be a home defence force for service during wartime and members could not be compelled to serve outside the country. However, on the outbreak of war on 4 August 1914, many members volunteered for Imperial Service. Therefore, TF units were split in August and September 1914 into 1st Line (liable for overseas service) and 2nd Line (home service for those unable or unwilling to serve overseas) units. Later, a 3rd Line was formed to act as a reserve, providing trained replacements for the 1st and 2nd Line regiments.

==== 1/1st Essex Yeomanry ====
===== Mobilisation =====
The 1st Line regiment was mobilized at Colchester on the outbreak of war and, with the Eastern Mounted Brigade, joined the 1st Mounted Division in the Ipswich area. By the end of August 1914 it was in the Woodbridge area. After mobilisation the Essex Yeomanry reorganised on a three-squadron basis:

- RHQ: 6 officers and 34 men, commanded by Lt-Col Deacon
- A Sqn: Colchester, Ardleigh Harwich, Clacton and Walton-on-the-Naze Trps, with the Southend Trp from D Sqn – 6 officers and 136 men commanded by Maj Eustace Hill
- B Sqn: Braintree and Finchingfield, Tiptree and Maldon, Halstead and Chelmsford Trps, with the Orsett Trp from D Sqn – 6 officers and 138 men commanded by Maj Guy Gold
- C Sqn: Waltham Abbey, Epping, Dunmow and Bishop's Stortford Trps, with the Brentwood and Stratford Trp from D Sqn – 6 officers and 135 men commanded by Maj Andrew Roddick
- Machine Gun Section – 25 men commanded by Lt Tom Buxton

The CO reported that the men were all medically fit, fully trained, and aged 19 years or older, and the regiment was accepted for overseas service. However, delays in obtaining replacement kit and new saddles delayed the regiment's departure for the Western Front until late November, and it just missed being eligible for the 'Mons Star' issued to the 'Old Contemptibles'.

The regiment landed at Le Havre on 1 December and joined the Royal Horse Guards (RHG) and the 10th Royal Hussars in France on 12 December 1914 as part of 8th Cavalry Brigade, 3rd Cavalry Division near Hazebrouck. (Note: As such, it was one of only six yeomanry regiments to be posted to a regular cavalry division in the war.The other five were: Bedfordshire Yeomanry in 1st Cavalry Division; Queen's Own Oxfordshire Hussars in 2nd Cavalry Division; Leicestershire Yeomanry in 3rd Cavalry Division; North Somerset Yeomanry in 3rd Cavalry Division; Queen's Own Yorkshire Dragoons in 4th Cavalry Division) It remained on the Western Front for the rest of the war.

===== Frezenberg Ridge =====
The regiment saw its first action at the Battle of Frezenberg Ridge on 13 May, when in pouring rain it made a dismounted bayonet charge that recaptured the disputed German front line trench. But having suffered substantial casualties from artillery fire, it was ordered to withdraw with the rest of the brigade. All told it suffered 51 killed, 91 wounded and 19 missing: a total of 161out of 302 who went into action. Among the dead were the CO, Lt-Col Deacon, and his acting second-in-command, Maj Roddick. Most of the dead, including Lt-Col Deacon, were buried in unmarked graves and are now commemorated on the Menin Gate Memorial to the Missing at Ypres. The regiment later chose Ypres 1915 and Frezenberg as the first two Battle Honours to be emblazoned on its guidon.

The surviving 149 Yeoman under the command of Maj Tony Buxton went into reserve at Hooge. A Regular Army officer, Lt-Col Wickham of the KDG, was brought in as CO to train and integrate the replacement drafts into the regiment. Major Whitmore, who had been wounded on the morning of 13 May and thus missed the afternoon assault on Frezenberg Ridge, returned in September and took command with the rank of Lt-Col. Popularly known as 'Brasso' he remained in command until 1918. The regiment was present with the rest of 3rd Cavalry Division defending Loos during the Battle of Loos (26–8 September 1915), but did not see serious action again until 1917. The regimental machine gun section was combined with those of the other regiments to form the 8th Brigade Machine Gun Squadron, Machine Gun Corps (MGC), on 29 February 1916.

===== Monchy-le-Preux =====
On 11 April, the second day of the Battle of the Scarpe that launched the Arras Offensive, 8th Cavalry Bde was ordered to advance mounted, over open country, to occupy high ground east and northeast of Monchy-le-Preux, a key position between the rivers Scarpe and Sensée. The Essex Yeomanry led the movement, with the 10th Hussars on its left and the RHG in reserve. C Squadron, leading, came under heavy machine gun fire while crossing a bridge and the Stortford and Dunmow Trps were almost annihilated. The Yeomanry and Hussars pressed on and occupied Monchy, where they dug in. The CO of the 10th Hussars having become a casualty, Lt-Col Whitmore commanded all the troops in Monchy. The two regiments and machine gun sqn held their positions in and around the town against determined German attacks for 18 hours before being relieved by infantry. The Essex Yeomanry suffered 135 casualties ad almost all their horses were killed. Lance-Corporal Mugford of the MG Sqn won a Victoria Cross in this action.

On 14 March 1918, the 1/1st Essex Yeomanry left the brigade to become a cyclist unit, then to form a machine gun battalion with the Bedfordshire Yeomanry. The German spring offensive forestalled this plan, and the regiment was remounted on 28 March and sent to the 1st Cavalry Division. From 4 April, it was split up with a squadron joining each regiment in 1st Cavalry Brigade (2nd Dragoon Guards, 5th Dragoon Guards and 11th Hussars). The squadrons' contributions were credited towards the regiment's battle honours.

After the regiment was broken up, Lt-Col Whitmore commanded the 10th Hussars until 1919, the only TF officer without previous regular service to command a regular cavalry regiment during the war.

==== 2/1st Essex Yeomanry ====
The 2nd Line regiment was formed at Colchester in 1914. In October, it moved to Wickham Market and by January 1915 it was in the 2/1st Eastern Mounted Brigade at Huntingdon. From June 1915 to March 1916, it was at Hounslow. On 31 March 1916, the remaining Mounted Brigades were ordered to be numbered in a single sequence; the brigade was numbered as 13th Mounted Brigade and joined 4th Mounted Division at Great Bentley.

In July 1916, there was a major reorganization of 2nd Line yeomanry units in the United Kingdom. All but 12 regiments were converted to cyclists; the 2/1st Essex Yeomanry remained mounted and transferred to the 3rd Mounted Brigade in the new 1st Mounted Division (3rd Mounted Division redesignated) at Leybourne Park, Kent. It moved to Brasted near Sevenoaks in March 1917.

In September 1917, the 1st Mounted Division was converted to The Cyclist Division and the regiment became a cyclist unit in 13th Cyclist Brigade of the division at Sevenoaks. In December 1917, the 13th Cyclist Brigade was broken up and the regiment was posted to the 6th Cyclist Brigade in Ireland in January 1918. It remained with the 6th Cyclist Brigade until the end of the war, stationed at The Curragh.

==== 3/1st Essex Yeomanry ====
The 3rd Line regiment was formed in 1915 and in the summer it was affiliated to a Reserve Cavalry Regiment in Eastern Command. In April 1916 it was affiliated to the 2nd Reserve Cavalry Regiment at Aldershot. Early in 1917 it was absorbed into the 4th Reserve Cavalry Regiment, also at Aldershot.

==== Victoria Cross ====
One Essex Yeoman was awarded the Victoria Cross (VC) during World War I. Harold Sandford Mugford, a shipping clerk born in Bermondsey in 1894 and brought up in East Ham, had joined the Essex Yeomanry in 1912. Mobilised in August 1914, he had served with the regiment at Frezenberg Ridge and Loos. In March 1916, as a member of the regiment's machine gun section he was transferred to the 8th Squadron, MGC, which supported 8th Cavalry Brigade. After the brigade had taken Monchy on 11 April 1917, L/Cpl Mugford placed his machine gun in an exposed forward position and drove off the enemy who were massing for a counter-attack. His No 2 was killed almost immediately and Mugford was severely wounded, but he refused to go to the dressing-station and continued to operate his gun, inflicting further losses on the enemy. A short time later a shell broke both his legs, but he remained at his gun, urging his comrades to take cover. He was then removed to the dressing-station, where he was also wounded in the arm. Mugford survived, despite the loss of both legs, and was awarded the VC for his conspicuous bravery.

=== Between the wars ===
The regiment was reconstituted in 1920 as part of the Territorial Army with regimental headquarters at Colchester. In 1921, the regiment was converted from cavalry to artillery and became the 104th (Essex Yeomanry) Brigade, Royal Field Artillery.

- Regimental Headquarters was at Colchester
- 413 (Essex Yeomanry) Battery was based at Colchester
- 414 (Essex Yeomanry) Battery was based at Harlow

In 1932, with regimental headquarters and 413 Battery transferred to Chelmsford, the regiment gained 339 (Essex Royal Horse Artillery) Battery based at Colchester, transferred from 85th (East Anglian) Field Brigade. In 1938, the regiment was renamed 104th (Essex Yeomanry) Regiment, Royal Horse Artillery (RHA).

=== World War II ===
At the outbreak of the World War II in 1939, the "104th (Essex Yeomanry) Regiment, RHA" formed a duplicate regiment as part of the increase in British military manpower. The second Essex Yeomanry regiment was designated 147 Regiment RHA (Essex Yeomanry), and reclassified as a field regiment in 1941. In 1942 both 147th (Essex Yeomanry) and 86th (East Anglian) (Herts Yeomanry) Field Regiments supplied cadres to help form 191st (Hertfordshire and Essex Yeomanry) Field Regiment, Royal Artillery.

==== 104th (Essex Yeomanry) Regiment, RHA ====
The first line regiment went to the Middle East in 1940 and served in most of the Western Desert battles, notably the Battle of El Alamein and the Siege of Tobruk. It went on to fight in the Italian Campaign and was stood-down in Austria in 1946.

==== 147th (Essex Yeomanry) Field Regiment, RA ====
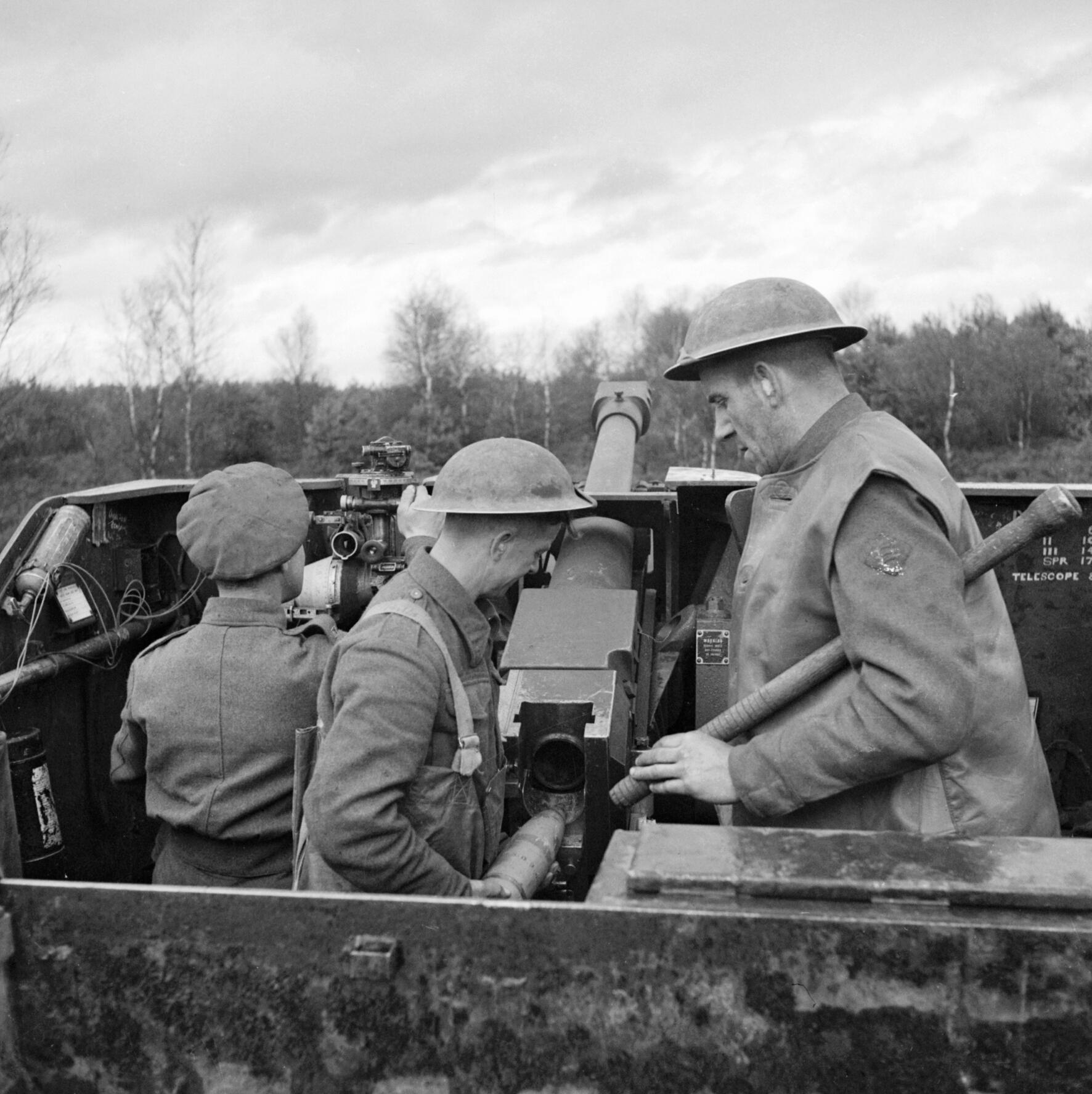
147th Field Regiment (Essex Yeomanry) in North-west Europe 1944-45 (IWM B12023)

The new regiment landed on the beaches of Normandy on D-Day, 1944. It was equipped with Sexton self-propelled 25-pounder guns and fought with the British 8th Armoured Brigade as a spearhead unit through France, Belgium, the Netherlands, and into Germany.

==== 14th Regiment, RHA ====
Another regiment, 14th RHA, was formed in India on 1 September 1942. It commanded 414th (Essex Yeomanry) Battery from 104th RHA, 524th Battery (formerly independent) and the newly formed 525th Battery. The Regimental Headquarters, 524th and 525th Batteries were disbanded on 27 April 1946 and 414th Battery was placed in suspended animation in Middle East Land Forces on the same date. 414th Battery was reconstituted in 304th (Essex Yeomanry) Field Regiment, Royal Artillery on 1 January 1947.

=== Postwar ===
The regiment was re-raised on 1 June 1947 as 304th (Essex Yeomanry) Field Regiment RA with headquarters at Chelmsford and batteries at Colchester (P), Southend (Q), and Harlow (R). The Royal Horse Artillery designation was restored in February 1955. Following the defence cuts of 1967, the unit was reduced to squadron status as 70 (Essex Yeomanry) Signal Squadron, part of 71 Yeomanry Signal Regiment, Royal Corps of Signals. On 25 April 2009, 70 (Essex Yeomanry) Signal Squadron was awarded the freedom of Harlow.

Following the reorganisation of the Royal Signals Reserves in 2009, 68 (Inns of Court & City Yeomanry) Signal Squadron merged with 70 (Essex Yeomanry) Signal Squadron to form 68 (Inns of Court & City and Essex Yeomanry) Signal Squadron.

Under Strategic Defence and Security Review in 2014, 907 Signal Troop was subordinated to 36 Signal Squadron, which then became 36 (Essex Yeomanry) Signal Squadron, part of 71 (Yeomanry) Signal Regiment.

== Heritage and ceremonial ==
=== Uniforms and insignia ===
The Essex Imperial Yeomanry adopted the same colours for its full dress uniform as the neighbouring Loyal Sussex Hussars: green with scarlet facings. The Khaki service dress had green facings from 1901 to 1905, the red facings until 1908. Slouch hats with the left side turned up were worn in both orders of dress. In the TF, brass dragoon helmets with scarlet plumes, worn with white gauntlet gloves, were introduced in full dress for the 1911 Coronation.

On becoming Royal Artillery the regiment retained its Yeomanry cap and collar badges and buttons, which were worn by all ranks until 1975. When the Essex RHA joined in 1933, the whole regiment adopted RHA-style ball buttons, but they bore the Yeomanry badge. In 1943, 147th Field Rgt adopted an embroidered regimental badge worn on both arms, consisting of three seaxes with green blades and yellow hilts on a red diamond. This was adopted by the whole regiment from 1947 to 1965. While attached to 8th Armoured Brigade, 1944–46, 147th Field Rgt wore a black Royal Armoured Corps beret.

Post World War II, all ranks wore Rifle green berets with the Yeomanry badge in brass (embroidered gold wire for officers). The No 1 dress was rifle green with two scarlet stripes down the overalls. Cavalry shoulder chains were added to the green No 1 dress in 1955 when the RHA title was restored to the regiment. 70 (Essex Yeomanry) Signal Squadron wore Royal Corps of Signals cap badges on the green beret of the Essex Yeomanry.

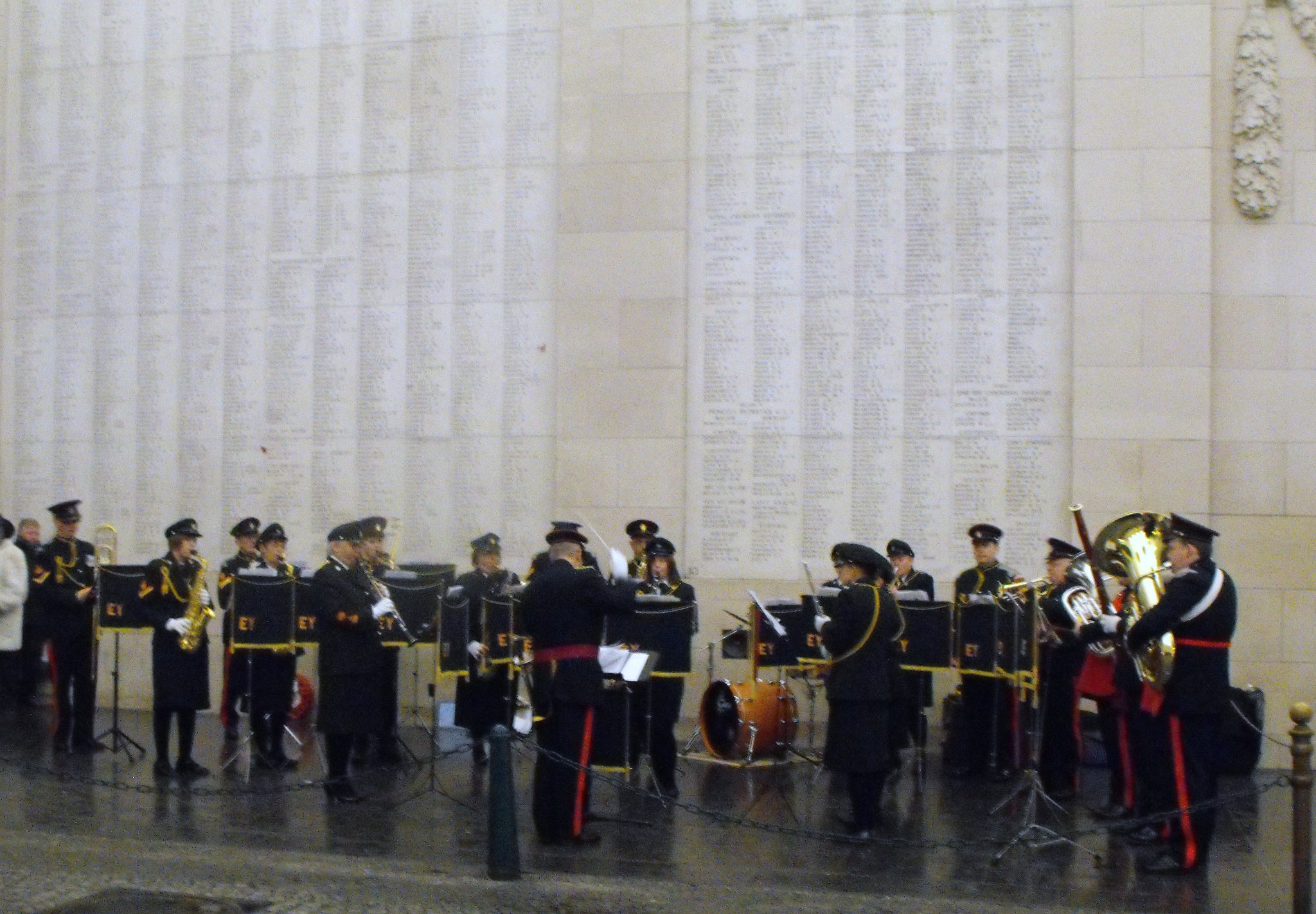
The Essex Yeomanry Band playing at The Menin Gate, Ypres, in Belgium

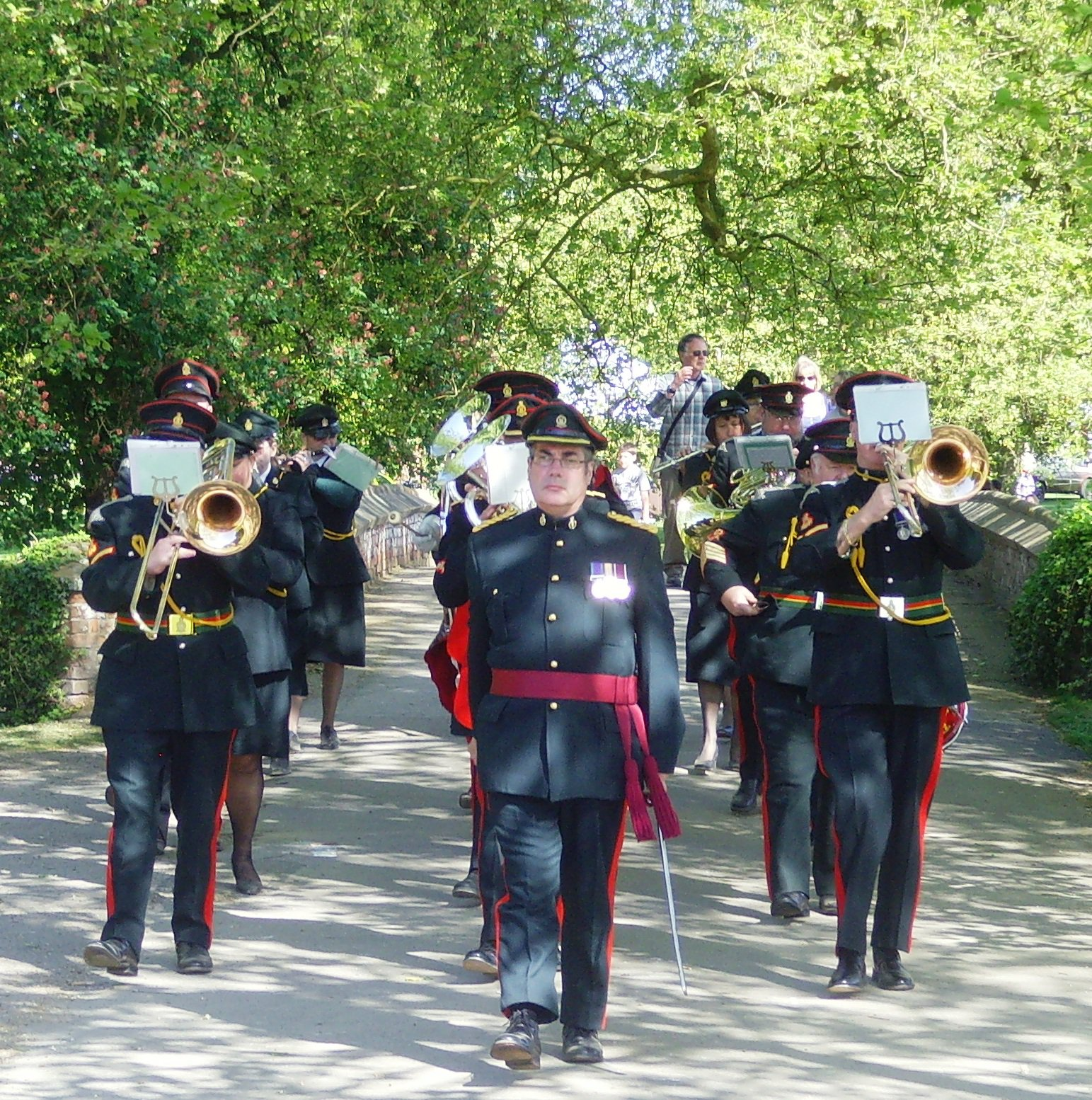
Director of Music Major Danny Greer leading the Band on Parade at Audley End House

=== Essex Yeomanry Band ===
The Essex Yeomanry Band is one of the oldest established Military bands in the East of England, being originally formed in 1809. In 1830, the Commanding Officer of the West Essex Yeomanry was financially supporting the Band out of his own pocket. An 1846 engraving shows a black drummer mounted on a white horse, sporting a plumed turban. The other mounted bandsmen wore the Yeomanry uniform of the period. In 1877, the West Essex Yeomanry was disbanded, but later reformed to become the Waltham Abbey Town Band. However, this newly formed band proudly continued to wear the Yeomanry uniform. The Essex Yeomanry became gunners in 1921, but still retained the Band. By 1937, the band was in the full dress uniform of the Regiment, complete with plumed brass helmets. During the Second World War, the Essex Yeomanry Band was disbanded, but reformed in 1947. This was a difficult time for the players, as all the uniforms had been destroyed with the bombing of Chelmsford in 1943. In 1952, official recognition of the band was given by the War Office, but like the Regiment, it was withdrawn in 1968.

==== Regimental marches ====
The regimental march before World War I was Hoch Habsburg ('Hail Habsburg'), which was probably discontinued as inappropriate once war broke out with Austria-Hungary. In 1962 the CO, Col Hugh Hunter Jones, introduced The Coggeshall Man's Wedding as the regimental march. The regimental slow march is the Slow March of the Royal Artillery, but Duke of York may have been used ca 1959.

=== Battle honours ===
The Essex Yeomanry was awarded the following battle honours:

First World War

Ypres 1915, St. Julien, Frezenberg, Loos, Arras 1917, Scarpe 1917, Somme 1918, Amiens, Albert 1918, Hindenburg Line, St. Quentin Canal, Beaurevoir, Cambrai 1918, Pursuit to Mons, France and Flanders 1914–18

Second World War

The Royal Artillery was present in nearly all battles and would have earned most of the honours awarded to cavalry and infantry regiments. In 1833, William IV awarded the motto Ubique (meaning "everywhere") in place of all battle honours.

=== Memorials ===
The regimental war memorials to the Essex Yeomen who died in the two world wars are in St Peter's Chapel in Chelmsford Cathedral, together with individual memorials to L/Cpl Harold Mugford, VC, (unveiled in June 2006) to Brig-Gen Sir Richard Colvin and to Col Sir Francis Whitmore. There is also a memorial window to Sir Richard Colvin in the Lady Chapel of Waltham Abbey Church. A memorial to the men of 3 Troop, D Sqn, Essex Yeomanry, and other local Territorials who died in World War I was at the Army Reserve Centre at Romford. In May 2009 a memorial was dedicated in Saint George's Memorial Church, Ypres, to commemorate Essex Yeomen who died in the Ypres Salient, most of whom have no known grave and are listed on the Menin Gate Memorial to the Missing. The regimental memorial in Normandy is at Asnelles on Gold Beach.

=== Honorary colonels ===
The following served as honorary colonel of the unit:

- Francis Greville, 5th Earl of Warwick, appointed 16 November 1901
- Brig-Gen Sir Richard Colvin, former CO, 1922 to 1935
- Col Sir Francis Whitmore, 1st Baronet, former CO, 1936 to 1950
- Maj-Gen Reginald Hobbs, CB, DSO, OBE, former CO, appointed 1961
- Col G.R. Judd, TD, former CO, from ? to ?; reappointed to the Essex Yeomanry (RHA), 1 April 1967

== See also ==
- Imperial Yeomanry
- List of Yeomanry Regiments 1908
- Yeomanry
- Yeomanry order of precedence
- British yeomanry during the First World War
- Second line yeomanry regiments of the British Army
- List of British Army Yeomanry Regiments converted to Royal Artillery

== Bibliography ==
- Anon, Regimental Badges and Service Caps, London: George Philip & Sons, 1941.
- Maj R. Money Barnes, The Soldiers of London, London: Seeley Service, 1963.
- Maj A.F. Becke,History of the Great War: Order of Battle of Divisions, Part 1: The Regular British Divisions, London: HM Stationery Office, 1934/Uckfield: Naval & Military Press, 2007, ISBN 1-847347-38-X.
- Col John K. Dunlop, The Development of the British Army 1899–1914, London: Methuen, 1938.
- Farndale, General Sir Martin (1996). History of the Royal Regiment of Artillery: The Years of Defeat: Europe and North Africa, 1939–1941. Brasseys. ISBN 1-85753-080-2.
- Foakes, Colonel S.P.; McKenzie-Bell, Major M. (2012). Essex Yeomanry: A Short History. Essex: Temperley Media/Essex Yeomanry Association. ISBN 978-0-9572333-0-0.
- Frederick, J.B.M. (1984). Lineage Book of British Land Forces 1660–1978. Wakefield, Yorkshire: Microform Academic Publishers. ISBN 1-85117-009-X.
- James, Brigadier E.A. (1978). British Regiments 1914–18. London: Samson Books Limited. ISBN 0-906304-03-2.
- Norman E.H. Litchfield, The Territorial Artillery 1908–1988 (Their Lineage, Uniforms and Badges), Nottingham: Sherwood Press, 1992, ISBN 0-9508205-2-0.
- Mileham, Patrick (1994). The Yeomanry Regiments; 200 Years of Tradition. Edinburgh: Canongate Academic. ISBN 1-898410-36-4.
- Perry, F.W. (1993). Order of Battle of Divisions Part 5B. Indian Army Divisions. Newport: Ray Westlake Military Books. ISBN 1-871167-23-X.
- Rinaldi, Richard A (2008). Order of Battle of the British Army 1914. Ravi Rikhye. ISBN 978-0-9776072-8-0.
- Col H.C.B. Rogers, The Mounted Troops of the British Army 1066–1945, London: Seeley Service, 1959.
- Edward M. Spiers, The Army and Society 1815–1914, London: Longmans, 1980, ISBN 0-582-48565-7.
