= Sir Thomas Barrett-Lennard, 1st Baronet =

British politician and baronet

Sir Thomas Barrett-Lennard, 1st Baronet FSA, DL (6 January 1760 – 25 June 1857) was a British politician and baronet.

== Early life ==
He was the illegitimate son of Thomas Barrett-Lennard, 17th Baron Dacre and Elizabeth FitzThomas. Barrett-Lennard was educated at Harrow School and Downing College, Cambridge.

== Career ==
He entered the British House of Commons for Essex South in 1832 and was a Member of Parliament (MP) until 1835. Barrett-Lennard was a deputy lieutenant of Essex, and a Fellow of the Society of Antiquaries of London. On 30 June 1801, he was created a baronet, of Belhus, in the County of Essex.

== Personal life ==
On 15 January 1787, he married firstly Dorothy St Aubyn, daughter of Sir John St Aubyn, 3rd Baronet. She died in 1830, and Barrett-Lennard married secondly Georgina Matilda Stirling, daughter of Sir Walter Stirling, 1st Baronet on 20 June 1833. He had seven sons and four daughters by his first wife as well as one son by his second wife.

Their fifth son, Edward Pomeroy Barrett-Lennard, emigrated to Australia where he established a large estate named after the one on which he had grown up. Barrett-Lennard died aged 96 and was at this time the most senior member of the baronetage. His oldest son Thomas represented Maldon and having predeceased his father for a year, Barrett-Lennard was succeeded in the baronetcy by his grandson Thomas.

Coat of arms of Sir Thomas Barrett-Lennard, 1st Baronet
Crest Out of a Ducal Coronet Or, an Irish Wolfdog's Head per fesse Argent and Ermine charged with an Escallop, barways nebule Gules and Sable Escutcheon Quarterly, 1st and 4th, Or on a fesse Gules three Fleur-de-Lis of the first (Lennard); 2nd and 3rd, per pale Argent and Gules Barry of four, counterchanged (Barrett); all within a Bordure wavy Sable Motto Pour bien desirer (The Noble Aim)

Parliament of the United Kingdom
New constituency	Member of Parliament for Essex South; 1832 – 1835; With: Robert Westley Hall-Dare	Succeeded by Robert Westley Hall-Dare; Thomas William Bramston
Baronetage of the United Kingdom
New creation	Baronet (of Belhus); 1801 – 1857	Succeeded by Thomas Barrett-Lennard
