= Harold Sandford Mugford =

- Born: 31 August 1894; London, England
- Died: 16 June 1958 (aged 63); Chelmsford, Essex, England
- Burial place: Southend Crematorium, Southend-on-Sea, Essex, England
- Military career
- Allegiance: United Kingdom
- Branch: British Army
- Rank: Lance Corporal
- Service number: 51507
- Units: Machine Gun Corps
- Conflicts: World War I
- Awards: Victoria Cross

Lance Corporal Harold Sandford Mugford VC (31 August 1894 – 16 June 1958) was a British Army soldier and an English recipient of the Victoria Cross (VC), the highest and most prestigious award for gallantry in the face of the enemy that can be awarded to British and Commonwealth forces.

He was 22 years old, and a Lance-Corporal in the 8th Cavalry Machine Gun Squadron MGC, 8th Cavalry Brigade, 3rd Cavalry Division, British Army during the First World War when the following deed took place for which he was awarded the VC.

On 11 April 1917 at Monchy-le-Preux, France, under intense fire, Lance-Corporal Mugford got his machine-gun into a forward, very exposed position from which he dealt very effectively with the enemy. Almost immediately his No. 2 was killed and he was severely wounded. He was ordered to go to a new position and then have his wounds dressed but this he refused to do, staying to inflict severe damage on the enemy with his gun. Soon afterwards a shell broke both his legs, but he still remained with his gun and when he was at last removed to the dressing station he was again wounded.

His VC is displayed at the Imperial War Museum (London, England) and there is a memorial to him in Chelmsford Cathedral.
