= Nazeing =

Village in Essex, England

Coordinates: 51.736687°N 0.058738°E

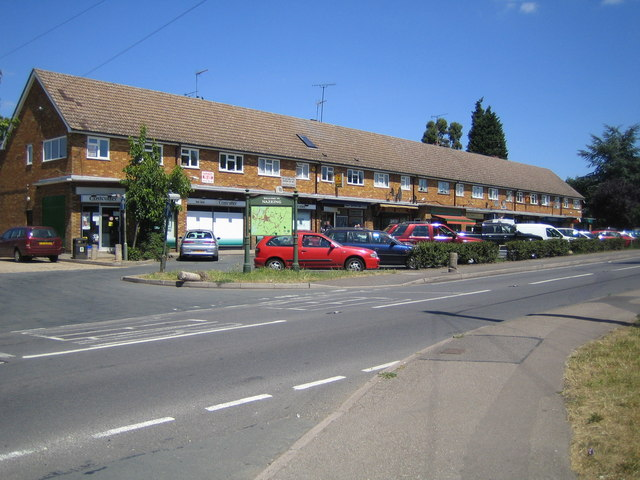
- Nazeingbury Parade, Lower Nazeing

- Location within Essex
- Population: 4,799 (Parish, 2021)
- OS grid reference: TL42250622
- Civil parish: Nazeing
- District: Epping Forest
- Shire county: Essex
- Region: East
- Country: England
- Sovereign state: United Kingdom
- Post town: Waltham Abbey
- Postcode district: EN9
- Dialling code: 01992
- Police: Essex
- Fire: Essex
- Ambulance: East of England
- UK Parliament: Harlow and District

Nazeing (/ˈneɪzɪŋ/ NAYZ-ing) is a village and civil parish in the Epping Forest district, in Essex, England. As well as the small village of Nazeing itself the parish also includes surrounding rural areas and the larger village of Lower Nazeing. The Prime Meridian passes to the west of Lower Nazeing. At the 2021 census the parish had a population of 4,799, of which 3,740 lived in the built up area of Lower Nazeing.

== Location and topography ==
Nazeing is approximately four miles north of Waltham Abbey, one mile south-west of Harlow, and is bounded on the west by the River Lea. Most of it is still rural, but during the past 40 years there has been a considerable development of market gardening, light industry, holiday fishing, and boating. The older village of Nazeing is separated by open farmland from the larger Lower Nazeing to the west.

The land gradually rises from the river to a small hill and bowl-shaped plateau, about 270 ft. above sea level, in the east. Apart from the alluvium by the river, and a strip of gravel a little to the east of it, the soil is London Clay. Nazeingwood Common covers much of the eastern plateau and was originally part of Waltham Forest, but in the 13th century was deforested for pasture. It was also ploughed up during the Second World War. From the common a small brook runs west through the middle of the parish.

== History of Nazeing ==
=== Early ===
Potsherds of Iron Age A and fragments of Iron Age pots have been found in Nazeing which show that people have lived here for more than 2000 years. Roman remains include burials found in Nazeing Mead, near the river. The original Saxon settlement was probably in the east of the parish, near the church. The position of this village, now called Upper Park Town, may have given Nazeing its name, which means 'settlers on a spur of land'. The Old English word nœss, or naze, is related to the modern word nose and refers to a spur or headland, while the suffix -ing means "the dwellers at", so the name can be translated as "People of the Headland". The Saxons first established compact settlements called hams; more scattered communities with names ending in ing followed a generation or two later. Waltham, the place in the wood, was probably settled by 600 A.D, which would suggest a date some time in the seventh century for its neighbour Nazeing. Until recently the area around Nazeing Primary School was known as the Ham fields, and it is possible that their name recalls the site of the first settlement in Nazeing.

The Domesday Book records Nazeing or Nasinga in the hundred of Waltham as follows: Canons of Waltham before and after 1066; Odo from Ranulf, brother of Ilger, and 2 freemen from him. ½ fishery. The manuscript of 1086 records three entries one of which states the village having seven villagers, 12 smallholders, one free man, seven cattle and 30 pigs.

White's Directory of Essex 1848 states: 'NAZEING, or NASING, 5 miles North by East of Waltham Abbey, and from 1 to 3 miles East of Broxbourn Station on the North-Eastern Railway, is a picturesque parish of scattered houses, extending three miles eastward from the river Lea, to which it sends a small rivulet.'

John Marius Wilson's Imperial Gazetteer of England and Wales described Nazeing in 1870–72 like this: 'NAZEING, a village and a parish in Epping district, Essex. The village stands 2¼ miles E of the river Lea at the boundary with Herts, 3 E of Broxbourne r. station, and 4¼ N W of Epping; and has a post-office under Waltham Cross. The parish extends to the river Lea, and comprises 3,893 acres. Real property, £6,710. Pop., 763. Houses, 165.'

=== World War One ===
Nazeing contributed 153 men to serve in the armed forces during the First World War, and the village has four war memorials, recording the names of the 28 men who died.

=== World War Two ===
Nazeing Common was the site of a dummy airfield, designed to be a decoy for nearby North Weald airfield. The land on the site is as it appears today, very hilly, not what one expects from an airfield. The lighting was mounted on wooden poles of varying lengths, so as to keep the proportion and angles right in its appearance from the air. Such dummy airfields were in operation from June 1940, but it is thought the Germans had detected Nazeing as a decoy site by the end of December. The site probably closed by the end of July 1941 as land was needed for agriculture. The decoy was originally built on common grazing land, and this was put to the plough in August 1941.

== Community ==
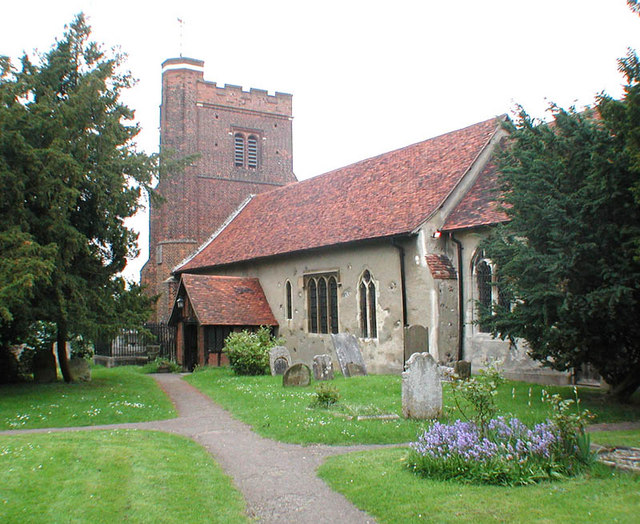
All Saints, Nazeing

Nazeing is said to be one of the largest villages in the UK. It forms a civil parish of the Epping Forest district and has its own Parish Council.

The village has two Anglican places of worship: the modern Saint Giles Parish in Lower Nazeing, and All Saints' Church, by far the older of the two. It also has a Congregational Church on Middle Street, founded in 1795.

The former Ponds petrol station at Nazeing crossroads was bought from Total by the Nazeing Parish Council prior to auction in 2006. There ware plans for it to be made into a community hall; however, these were abandoned in 2013 due to escalating costs. In 2014 the site was on the market after the Parish Council granted planning permission for six houses.

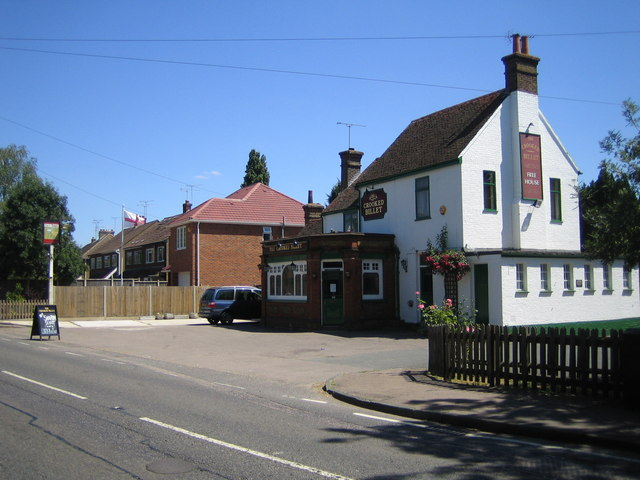
The Crooked Billet, Lower Nazeing

== Places of interest ==
Along the lane to Nazeing Common are several cottages and the old post office, all listed as Grade II buildings. Lodge Farm, standing remotely on the edge of the common, dates from 1777.

Nazeing has the largest number of listed buildings within the Epping Forest District Council Conservation Areas. There is one Grade I and over 50 Grade II listed buildings including as least one listed K6 Telephone Kiosk which is in Betts Lane, to the south-west of Mill Bungalow. The parish church – the Church of All Saints, in Betts Lane – dates from the 12th century and is listed Grade I.

=== Nazeing Park ===
Nazeing Park is a Grade II-listed Georgian mansion which can be seen from the Nazeing Common Road. It was built between 1780 and 1820 by William Palmer, a London merchant and the younger son of a prominent Leicestershire family and father of George Palmer, MP for South Essex from 1836 to 1847. The building has had a number of uses during its long history, including family estate and "Boarding Special School for Maladjusted Pupils".

=== World War II bunkers ===
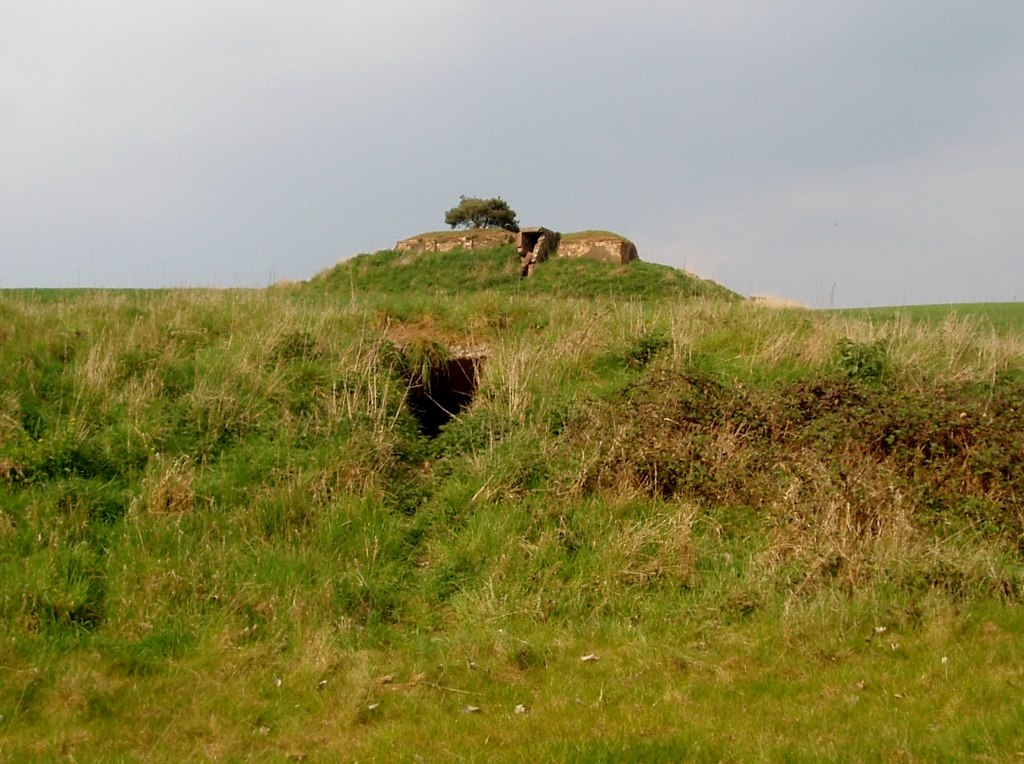

World War II Bunkers – The command and control bunkers are listed by English Heritage (No. 1020391) and still in good condition and were built away from the layout of the airfield so as to give the RAF crews that manned this site some protection. These buildings housed generators for powering the lighting and had an ops room where the lights were operated from, and where contact could be maintained by telephone to the controlling station i.e.: North Weald itself. The other bunker 100 ft further down the hill was used for shelter and a general area for sleeping and cooking. This site was in operation from June 1940, but it is thought the Germans had detected Nazeing as a decoy site by the end of December. The site probably closed by the end of July 1941 as land was needed for increased agriculture and this was put to the plough in August 1941. These bunkers can be located north of the Nazeing Brook on the Lodge Farm side.

=== Clayton Hill ===
Clayton Hill is a park situated in Lee Valley park popular to many dog walkers and villagers alike. It is a common place to meet up and spend time together.

== Industry and commerce ==
For most of its history Nazeing has been a rural parish with agriculture as the main occupation. The river Lea on the west and the forest on the south provided additional employment. During WWII Nazeing as part of the Lea Valley became increasingly important providing the country with much of its fresh salad produce. The Lea Valley also had numerous factories geared to aircraft repairs, furniture manufacture, agro-fertilisers, as well as power stations and breweries some of which were located in and around Nazeing. During the past forty years in Nazeing there has been considerable development of market gardening and light industry near the river.

=== Hillgrove Business Park ===
Nazeing is home to Hillgrove Business Park, a medium size industrial estate which holds over 30 companies.

=== Market gardening and nurseries ===
The Lea Valley, particularly around Nazeing, is associated with market gardening, nurseries and garden centres. The industry once dominated the area in and around the village, this also spawned industries such as Pan Britannica Industries and L F King & Son Ltd. In the 1930s the Lea Valley contained the largest concentration of greenhouses in the world. Today, in most parts south of Cheshunt the greenhouses have been replaced by residential areas.

=== Nazeing Glass Works ===
Nazeing glass works – Glass making started on the site in 1928 when members of the Kempton family relocated their small glass works from Southwark in London to Nazeing. Nazeing Glass Works is one of the oldest surviving glass manufacturers in the UK and can identify itself in glass manufacturing history back to 1612 in Vauxhall. The registered company Nazeing Glass Works Limited was formed in 1931. In 1956 it was described as having one four-pot, four single-pot and one tank furnace all fired by heavy fuel oil.

=== Gravel extraction ===
The other major land use in the area is gravel extraction which has been carried out for a number of years by Redland Gravel Company and other companies. Throughout the area evidence of this extraction can be seen in the form of flooded gravel pits. However, many of the lakes have now been turned into leisure areas when extraction has been completed for use as water sports facilities and used by sailing clubs, water sports enthusiasts and to provide fishing areas.

== Education facilities ==
Nazeing has its own primary school – Nazeing Primary School is a Community School for children aged 4 to 11 years and is maintained by Essex County Council. The school is mixed gender and had 254 pupils on the school roll in 2014. Pupils come to the school from the local village community as well as from the neighbouring towns of Harlow and Waltham Abbey.

Nazeing Pre-School – Nazeing Pre-School is an Ofsted inspected pre-school for 3- and 4-year-old children.

== Sport and leisure ==
Nazeing is home to a golf course, a Gym and has a number of youth football teams which play at Bumbles Green Leisure Centre.

Nazeing Common Cricket Club – Established in 1883 the club is currently running two sides on a Saturday and two sides on a Sunday.

There are many places for fishing in and around the village of Nazeing for example Nazeing Meads which is run by Lee Valley Regional Park Authority

There are also good water sports facilities in and around Nazeing for activities such as sailing, some of which use the lakes which have been formed from previous gravel extraction activities. For example, the Broxbourne Sailing Club is actually located at Meadgate Road in Nazeing on the lakes formed by previous gravel extraction works.

Redwings Horse Sanctuary – The Ada Cole Rescue Centre, Broadley Common, Nazeing is home to around 70 horses, ponies and donkeys and is open to the public. In October 2005, Redwings merged with the Ada Cole Memorial Stables, a rescue centre established in memory of a lady who campaigned for animal welfare.

== Notable people ==
- John Eliot (1604–90), the 'Apostle to the Indians' in Massachusetts, who translated the entire Bible into the Algonquian language, and who founded Roxbury Latin School lived at Nazeing as a boy.
- William Salmon (1610–57), ancestor of Americans such as New Jersey's veterinarian and Salmonella namesake Daniel Elmer Salmon (1850–1914), was born in Nazeing.
- Nicholas Camp (1597–1653), ancestor of Walter Camp (1859–1925) of Connecticut, the "Father of American Football", was from Nazeing.
