= Richard Wingfield-Baker =

British politician

Richard Baker Wingfield-Baker MP, DL

Member of Parliament for South Essex
- In office 4 April 1857 – 1859
- Preceded by: Sir William Bowyer-Smijth, 11th Baronet
- Succeeded by: John Perry-Watlington

Member of Parliament for South Essex
- In office 16 Nov 1868 – 1874
- Preceded by: Henry Selwin-Ibbetson, 1st Baron Rookwood
- Succeeded by: Thomas Charles Baring

Personal details
- Born: 1802
- Died: 25 March 1880 (aged 77–78)
- Party: Liberal
- Spouse: Margaret Maria Hanmer
- Education: Christ Church, Oxford
- Profession: Barrister

Richard Baker Wingfield-Baker (sometimes Richard Baker Wingfield Baker or Richard Wingfield Baker; born Richard Baker Wingfield) (1802 – 25 March 1880) MP, DL, was a Liberal Party politician, High Sheriff and deputy lieutenant in the English county of Essex. Like his father, maternal grandfather, half-brother, and brother-in-law, Wingfield-Baker served as a Member of Parliament.

== Early years ==
His parents were William Wingfield 1772 – 1858), MP for Bodmin, and Lady Charlotte-Maria (died 1807), eldest daughter of Henry Digby, 1st Earl Digby. Wingfield-Baker's siblings were: George-Digby (who succeeded to the estates of the Earl Digby), John-Digby, Mary, Caroline (who married Charles Pepys, 1st Earl of Cottenham), and Frances-Eliza.

After his father's second marriage to Elizabeth, daughter of William Mills of Bisterne, Hampshire, Wingfield-Baker there were several half-siblings including:Charles John Wingfield Member of Parliament for Gravesend, William-Wriothesley-Digby (Vicar of Gulval), Frederick, Henry, Kenelm-Digby, and Julia.

Wingfield-Baker entered Rugby School in 1815. He began his studies at Christ Church, Oxford in 1820, and received a BA degree from in 1827.

== Career ==
Wingfield-Baker became a Barrister at law at Inner Temple in 1827.

He was appointed a deputy lieutenant of Essex on 14 September 1852 under Benjamin Mildmay, Lord Lieutenant of Essex, and in 1867 served as High Sheriff of Essex. Wingfield-Baker held the position of Chairman of the Quarter Sessions. For a time, he was Secretary to the Lord Chancellor Cottenham, his sister Caroline's husband.

Wingfield-Baker, a Liberal, was elected a Member of Parliament for South Essex twice, first for the period of 1857-1859 and again 1868–1874.

His military service was with the 2nd Essex Volunteer Artillery, being promoted captain on 13 September 1860. In June 1864, he became Captain Commandant.

== Personal life ==
Richard Baker was a relative by marriage. Upon his (fathers) death – in 1827, William Wingfield inherited the John Baker title. Upon the death of Richard Baker's widow in 1849, the remainder of the estate, including the Orsett title, also passed to William Wingfield who, in the same year, legally changed his surname to Wingfield-Baker by Royal licensure. Upon the death of William Wingfield on 21 March 1858, his son, Richard Baker Wingfield, inherited the estate and assumed the additional surname of Baker.

Wingfield-Baker of Orsett Hall had a second residence at 2 Lowndes Square, London SW. He also owned land in Stoke Damerel, Devon.

Wingfield-Baker married Margaret Maria Hanmer, daughter of Lt.-Col. Thomas Hanmer and Arabella Charlotte Bucknall, in 1837, and sister of John Hanmer, 1st Baron Hanmer. They had at least one child, a son, Captain Digby Hanmer Wingfield (d. 1884). Wingfield-Baker died in 1880 from injuries sustained in hunting accident.

Upon Wingfield-Baker's death on 25 March 1880, his only son succeeded him.

Parliament of the United Kingdom
Preceded by Sir William Bowyer-Smijth	Member of Parliament for Essex South; 1857–1859; With: Thomas William Bramston	Succeeded by John Perry-Watlington
Parliament of the United Kingdom
Preceded by Henry Selwin-Ibbetson	Member of Parliament for Essex South; 1868–1874; With: Andrew Johnston	Succeeded by Thomas Charles Baring
Honorary titles
Preceded by Arthur Pryor	High Sheriff of Essex; 1867–1868	Succeeded by William Charles Smith
