= Belhus, Essex =

Coordinates: 51.510480°N 0.268229°E

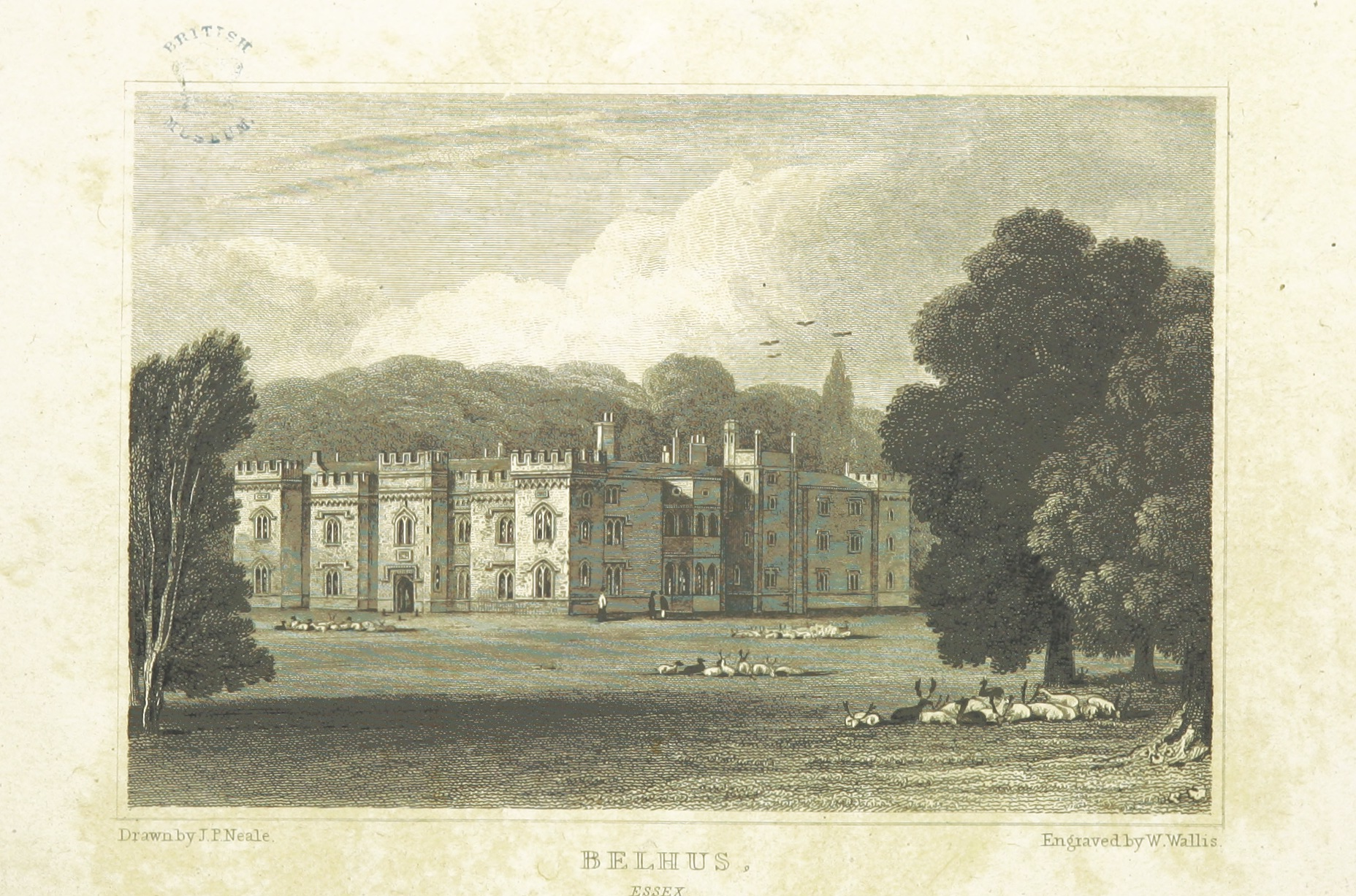
- Belhus c. 1818

- Location within Essex
- OS grid reference: TQ575815
- Unitary authority: Thurrock
- Shire county: Essex
- Region: East
- Country: England
- Sovereign state: United Kingdom
- Post town: SOUTH OCKENDON
- Postcode district: RM15
- Dialling code: 01708
- Police: Essex
- Fire: Essex
- Ambulance: East of England
- UK Parliament: Thurrock

Belhus is a golf course, country park, former stately home and manor in the parish of Aveley in Essex, England. The historic manor was known in medieval times variously as "Bellhouse, Belhouse (as commemorated by today's "Belhouse Avenue" in the village of Aveley), Bell House", etc. It is now part of the Thames Chase woodland planned for the area.

== Origin and history ==
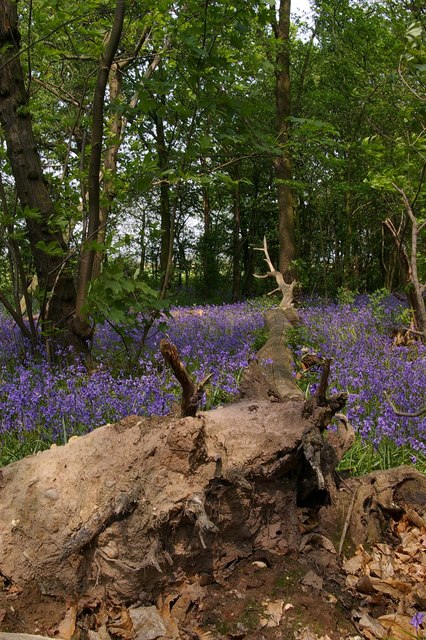
A fallen tree in Belhus Wood

The name Belhus derived from the 14th-century tenants of the manor who, according to Morant (1768), came from Ramsden Bellhouse. The name is associated with Nicholas de Belhus, who may have taken his surname name from the manor. It was later the home of the Barrett family, later the Barrett-Lennard family.

The house was visited by Queen Elizabeth I in 1578. Belhus was among the properties owned by Dorothy, Lady Dacre, after the death of her husband. After her own death, an inventory was taken of her possessions at Belhus.

A 17th-century curtain from Belhus was donated to the Victoria and Albert Museum by Mrs John Pollock, daughter of Sir Richard Barrett-Lennard, 5th Baronet.

In the middle of the 18th century, the mansion was substantially altered to conform to the fashionable "gothic" style. Thurrock Museum has a 19th-century copy of an earlier original painting showing how the mansion looked around 1710.

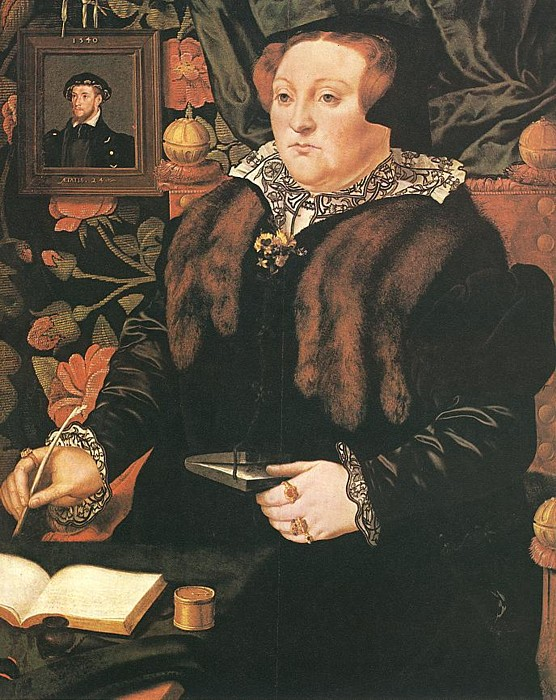
The portrait of Mary Neville, Baroness Dacre, that once hung at Belhus

Among the family portraits at Belhus was a work by Hans Eyworth - Mary Neville, Baroness Dacre - now in the National Gallery of Canada. This was seen at Belhus in 1761 by the art historian, Horace Walpole.

The Barrett-Lennard family auctioned the contents of Belhus in 1923 and the house was demolished after World War II, due to suffering bomb damage as well as vandalism from the military personnel who were stationed there.

== Belhus today ==
The grounds around the mansion were landscaped by Capability Brown in the 1740s and 1750s. Some of the features including earthen mounds can be seen in the original parkland which is currently used for part of the golf course operated by Impulse Leisure. The remains of the mansion can still be seen on the 10th hole of the golf course.

The 'long pond' is another feature designed by Capability Brown although it was actually built by Richard Woods. It can still be seen, although the construction of the M25 motorway has robbed it of its original rural setting. A wooded country park has been developed using other parts of the grounds of the house.

Some parts of the original interior are in the Thurrock Museum, including a magnificent fireplace. Other parts of the interior were rescued when the house was demolished and are displayed at Valence House Museum, Dagenham.

The grounds of the estate were placed on the Heritage at Risk Register in 2018. In 2021 Historic England carried out onsite research into the grounds, and the remains of Tudor gardens were discovered.

== See also ==
- Barrett-Lennard baronets
- Belhus, Western Australia
