= South Essex =

Parliamentary constituency in the United Kingdom, 1832–1885

- Former county constituency for the House of Commons
- County: Essex

1832–1885
- Seats: Two
- Created from: Essex
- Replaced by: South East Essex; Romford; West Ham North; West Ham South; Walthamstow; Epping; Chelmsford
- During its existence contributed to new seat(s) of: East Essex, West Essex

South Essex (formally the Southern division of Essex) was a county constituency represented in the House of Commons of the Parliament of the United Kingdom from 1832 to 1885. It elected two Members of Parliament (MPs) using the bloc vote system.

== History ==
The constituency was created by the Reform Act 1832, with effect from the general election in December 1832, when the former Essex constituency was divided into Northern and Southern divisions. From 1868, it was reduced in size when Essex was redivided into the Eastern, Southern and Western divisions. It was abolished under the Redistribution of Seats Act 1885 when the county was divided into eight single-member divisions.

== Boundaries ==
=== 1832–1868 ===
- The Hundreds of Barstable, Becontree, Chafford, Chelmsford, Dengie, Harlow, Ongar, Rochford, and Waltham; and
- The Liberty of Havering.

See map on Vision of Britain website.

=== 1868–1885 ===
- The Hundreds of Becontree, Chafford, Barstable, and Rochford; and
- The Liberty of Havering.

See map on Vision of Britain website.

== Areas covered ==
Hundred/Liberty	1832	1868	After 1885 (post-abolition)
Becontree (West Ham, Plaistow etc.)	South Essex	South Essex	West Ham North and West Ham South
Becontree (Barking, Dagenham, East Ham, Wanstead etc.)	South Essex	South Essex	Romford
Becontree (Walthamstow, Low Leyton and Woodford)	South Essex	South Essex	Walthamstow
Chafford (Brentwood end)	South Essex	South Essex	Chelmsford
Chafford (Aveley, Grays and Thurrock end)	South Essex	South Essex	South East Essex
Barstable (Billericay and Shenfield etc.)	South Essex	South Essex	Chelmsford
Barstable (Orsett, Tilbury and Canvey Island)	South Essex	South Essex	South East Essex
Rochford	South Essex	South Essex	South East Essex
Liberty of Havering/Liberty of Havering-atte-Bower	South Essex	South Essex	Romford
Dengie (Maldon (burgage of town excluded) to Burnham and Tillingham)	South Essex	East Essex	South East Essex
Chelmsford	South Essex	West Essex	Chelmsford
Harlow	South Essex	West Essex	Epping
Ongar	South Essex	West Essex	Epping
Waltham (Nazeing to Chingford)		West Essex	Epping

The place for "holding of courts for election of members" from 1867 became Brentwood under the 1867 Act.

== Members of Parliament ==
Election	1st Member	1st Party	2nd Member	2nd Party
1832	Robert Westley Hall-Dare	Tory	Sir Thomas Barrett-Lennard, Bt	Whig
1834	Robert Westley Hall-Dare	Conservative	Sir Thomas Barrett-Lennard, Bt	Whig
1835	Robert Westley Hall-Dare	Conservative	Thomas William Bramston	Conservative
1836 by-election	George Palmer	Conservative	Thomas William Bramston	Conservative
1847	Sir Edward Buxton, Bt	Whig	Thomas William Bramston	Conservative
1852	Sir William Bowyer-Smijth, Bt	Conservative	Thomas William Bramston	Conservative
1857	Richard Wingfield-Baker	Whig	Thomas William Bramston	Conservative
1859	John Perry-Watlington	Conservative	Thomas William Bramston	Conservative
1865	Henry Selwin-Ibbetson	Conservative	Lord Eustace Cecil	Conservative
1868	Richard Wingfield-Baker	Liberal	Andrew Johnston	Liberal
1874	Thomas Charles Baring	Conservative	William Makins	Conservative
1885	Constituency divided			

== Election results ==
=== Elections in the 1830s ===
General election 1832: South Essex
Party	Candidate	Votes	%
Tory	Robert Westley Hall-Dare	2,088	41.3
Whig	Thomas Barrett-Lennard	1,538	30.4
Whig	William Pole-Tylney-Long-Wellesley	1,432	28.3
Turnout		3,592	80.0
Registered electors		4,488	
Majority		550	10.9
Tory win (new seat)			
Majority		106	2.1
Whig win (new seat)			

General election 1835: South Essex
Party	Candidate	Votes	%	±%
Conservative	Robert Westley Hall-Dare	2,212	41.4	+20.8
Conservative	Thomas William Bramston	2,118	39.7	+19.1
Whig	Champion Edward Branfill	1,010	18.9	−39.8
Majority		1,108	20.8	N/A
Turnout		3,151	67.7	−12.3
Registered electors		4,655		
Conservative hold		Swing	+20.4	
Conservative gain from Whig		Swing	+19.5	

Dare's death caused a by-election.

By-election, 9 June 1836: South Essex
Party	Candidate	Votes	%	±%
Conservative	George Palmer	2,103	57.9	−23.2
Whig	Champion Edward Branfill	1,527	42.1	+23.2
Majority		576	15.8	−4.9
Turnout		3,630	68.7	+1.0
Registered electors		5,286		
Conservative hold		Swing	−23.2	

General election 1837: South Essex
Party	Candidate	Votes	%	±%
Conservative	Thomas William Bramston	2,511	39.7	±0.0
Conservative	George Palmer	2,260	35.8	−5.6
Whig	Champion Edward Branfill	1,550	24.5	+5.6
Majority		710	11.3	−9.5
Turnout		3,933	70.9	+3.2
Registered electors		5,547		
Conservative hold		Swing	−1.4	
Conservative hold		Swing	−4.2	

=== Elections in the 1840s ===
General election 1841: South Essex
Party	Candidate	Votes	%	±%
Conservative	Thomas William Bramston	2,310	45.1	+5.4
Conservative	George Palmer	2,230	43.5	+7.7
Whig	Rowland Gardner Alston	583	11.4	−13.1
Majority		1,647	32.1	+20.8
Turnout		c. 2,853	c. 50.7	c. −20.2
Registered electors		5,632		
Conservative hold		Swing	+6.0	
Conservative hold		Swing	+7.1	

General election 1847: South Essex
Party	Candidate	Votes	%	±%
Conservative	Thomas William Bramston	2,158	38.7	−6.4
Whig	Edward Buxton	1,729	31.0	+19.6
Conservative	William Bowyer-Smijth	1,694	30.4	−13.1
Turnout		2,791 (est)	52.4 (est)	+1.7
Registered electors		5,326		
Majority		429	7.7	−24.4
Conservative hold		Swing	−8.1	
Majority		35	0.6	N/A
Whig gain from Conservative		Swing	+19.6	

=== Elections in the 1850s ===
General election 1852: South Essex
Party	Candidate	Votes	%	±%
Conservative	Thomas William Bramston	2,651	38.4	−0.3
Conservative	William Bowyer-Smijth	2,457	35.6	+5.2
Whig	Edward Buxton	1,803	26.1	−4.9
Majority		654	9.5	N/A
Turnout		4,357 (est)	74.9 (est)	+22.5
Registered electors		5,819		
Conservative hold		Swing	+1.1	
Conservative gain from Whig		Swing	+3.8	

General election 1857: South Essex
Party	Candidate	Votes	%	±%
Conservative	Thomas William Bramston	2,332	35.6	−2.8
Whig	Richard Wingfield	2,119	32.3	+6.2
Conservative	William Bowyer-Smijth	2,102	32.1	−3.5
Turnout		4,336 (est)	70.3 (est)	−4.6
Registered electors		6,169		
Majority		213	3.3	−6.2
Conservative hold		Swing	−3.0	
Majority		17	0.2	N/A
Whig gain from Conservative		Swing	+6.2	

General election 1859: South Essex
Party	Candidate	Votes	%	±%
Conservative	Thomas William Bramston	2,896	36.9	+1.3
Conservative	John Perry-Watlington	2,704	34.5	+2.4
Liberal	Richard Wingfield-Baker	2,245	28.6	−3.7
Majority		459	5.9	N/A
Turnout		5,045 (est)	75.6 (est)	+5.3
Registered electors		6,669		
Conservative hold		Swing	+1.6	
Conservative gain from Liberal		Swing	+2.1	

=== Elections in the 1860s ===
General election 1865: South Essex
Party	Candidate	Votes	%	±%
Conservative	Henry Selwin	2,817	35.6	−1.3
Conservative	Eustace Cecil	2,710	34.3	−0.2
Liberal	Richard Wingfield-Baker	2,382	30.1	+1.5
Majority		328	4.2	−1.7
Turnout		5,146 (est)	70.1 (est)	−5.5
Registered electors		7,338		
Conservative hold		Swing	−1.0	
Conservative hold		Swing	−0.5	

General election 1868: South Essex
Party	Candidate	Votes	%	±%
Liberal	Richard Wingfield-Baker	Unopposed		
Liberal	Andrew Johnston	Unopposed		
Registered electors		7,127		
Liberal gain from Conservative				
Liberal gain from Conservative				

=== Elections in the 1870s ===
General election 1874: South Essex
Party	Candidate	Votes	%	±%
Conservative	Thomas Charles Baring	3,646	28.9	New
Conservative	William Makins	3,528	27.9	New
Liberal	Richard Wingfield-Baker	2,735	21.6	N/A
Liberal	Andrew Johnston	2,728	21.6	N/A
Majority		793	6.3	N/A
Turnout		6,319 (est)	72.5 (est)	N/A
Registered electors		8,713		
Conservative gain from Liberal		Swing	N/A	
Conservative gain from Liberal		Swing	N/A	

=== Elections in the 1880s ===
General election 1880: South Essex
Party	Candidate	Votes	%	±%
Conservative	Thomas Charles Baring	4,841	26.8	−2.1
Conservative	William Makins	4,726	26.2	−1.7
Liberal	Edward Buxton	4,324	24.0	+2.4
Liberal	Leonard Lyell	4,147	23.0	+1.4
Majority		402	2.2	−4.1
Turnout		9,019 (est)	75.5 (est)	+3.0
Registered electors		11,950		
Conservative hold		Swing	−2.3	
Conservative hold		Swing	−1.6	

== Sources ==
- Leigh Rayment's Historical List of MPs – Constituencies beginning with "E" (part 2)
- Craig, F. W. S. (1989) [1977]. British parliamentary election results 1832–1885 (2nd ed.). Chichester: Parliamentary Research Services. p. 387. ISBN 0-900178-26-4.

Preceded by Essex	UK Parliament constituency 1832–1885	Succeeded by South East Essex
Preceded by Essex	UK Parliament constituency 1832–1885	Succeeded by Epping
Preceded by Essex	UK Parliament constituency 1832–1885	Succeeded by West Ham North
Preceded by Essex	UK Parliament constituency 1832–1885	Succeeded by West Ham South
Preceded by Essex	UK Parliament constituency 1832–1885	Succeeded by Romford
Preceded by Essex	UK Parliament constituency 1832–1885	Succeeded by Walthamstow
