= Thomas William Bramston =

British politician

T.W. (Thomas William) Bramston (30 October 1796 – 21 May 1871) was Conservative and Protectionist Member for South Essex, 1835–1865. He was a trustee of the Royal Agricultural Society of England and a noted cattle breeder at the family estate, Skreens (established by Lord Chief Justice Sir John Bramston in 1635), near Roxwell, Essex. In 1830 he married Elizabeth Harvey, daughter of Admiral Sir Eliab Harvey Nugent, commander of HMS Temeraire at the Battle of Trafalgar.

Their second son was Sir John Bramston, a Queensland politician who was a minister in the Herbert government, Attorney-General in the Palmer Ministry, later Attorney-General in Hong Kong and Assistant Under-Secretary of State for the Colonies.
