= Speaker's House =

Residence of UK House of Commons Speaker

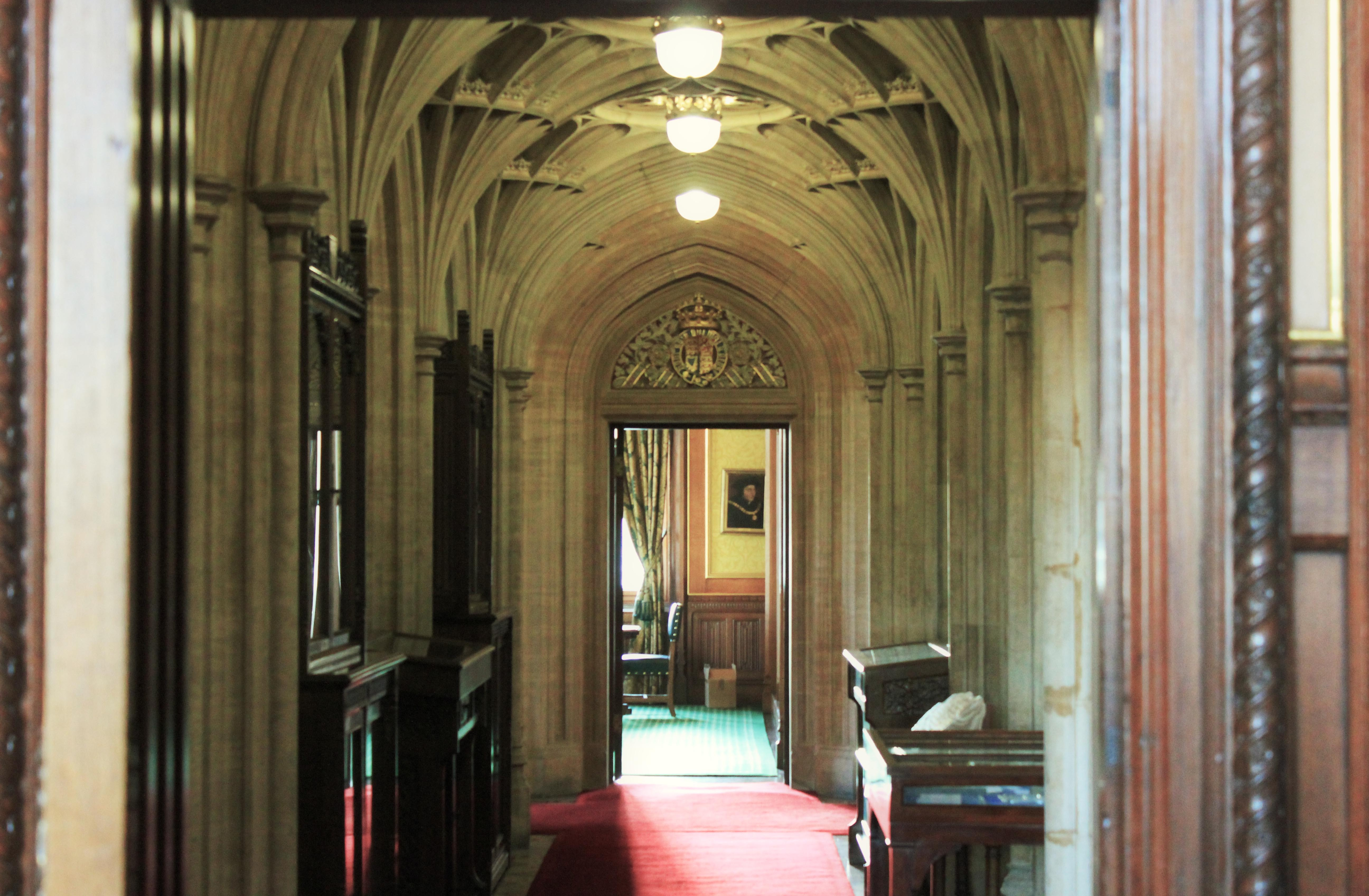
- A corridor in Speaker's House

- Location of the Palace of Westminster in central London
- 51°29′57″N 00°07′29″W
- Location: Westminster; London; SW1A 0AA; United Kingdom

History
- Built: 1808; 218 years ago
- Demolished: 1834 (due to fire)
- Rebuilt: 1859

Site notes
- Architect(s): Charles Barry and Augustus Pugin
- Architectural style: Perpendicular Gothic Revival
- Owner: King Charles III in right of the Crown

UNESCO World Heritage Site
- Official name: Palace of Westminster, Westminster Abbey, and St Margaret's Church
- Type: Cultural
- Criteria: i, ii, iv
- Designated: 1987 (11th session)
- Reference no.: 426
- Country: United Kingdom
- Region: Europe
- Extensions: 2008

Listed Building – Grade I
- Official name: Houses of Parliament / The Palace of Westminster
- Designated: 5 February 1970
- Reference no.: 1226284

Speaker's House is the official residence of the Speaker of the House of Commons, the lower house and primary chamber of the Parliament of the United Kingdom. It is located in the Palace of Westminster in London. It was originally located next to St Stephen's Chapel and was rebuilt and enlarged by James Wyatt in the early 19th century. After the burning of Parliament in 1834 it was rebuilt by Charles Barry as part of the new Palace of Westminster in the Perpendicular Gothic Revival style. It is located at the northeast corner of the palace and is used for official functions and meetings. Each day, prior to the sitting of the House of Commons, the Speaker and other officials walk in procession from the apartments to the House of Commons Chamber.

== Design ==
=== Pre–1834 ===
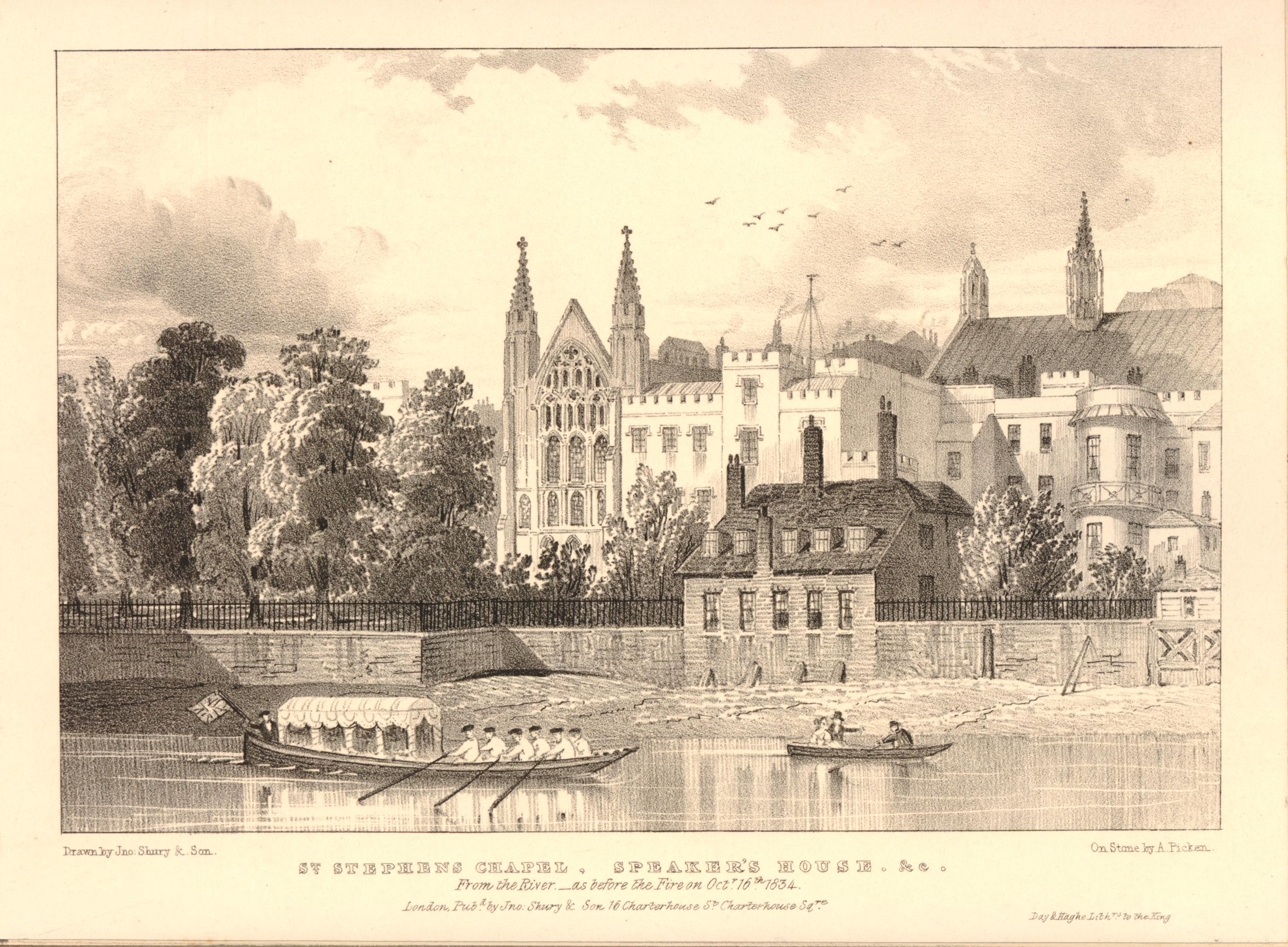
View of the Speaker's House from the river "as before the Fire on October 16th 1834"

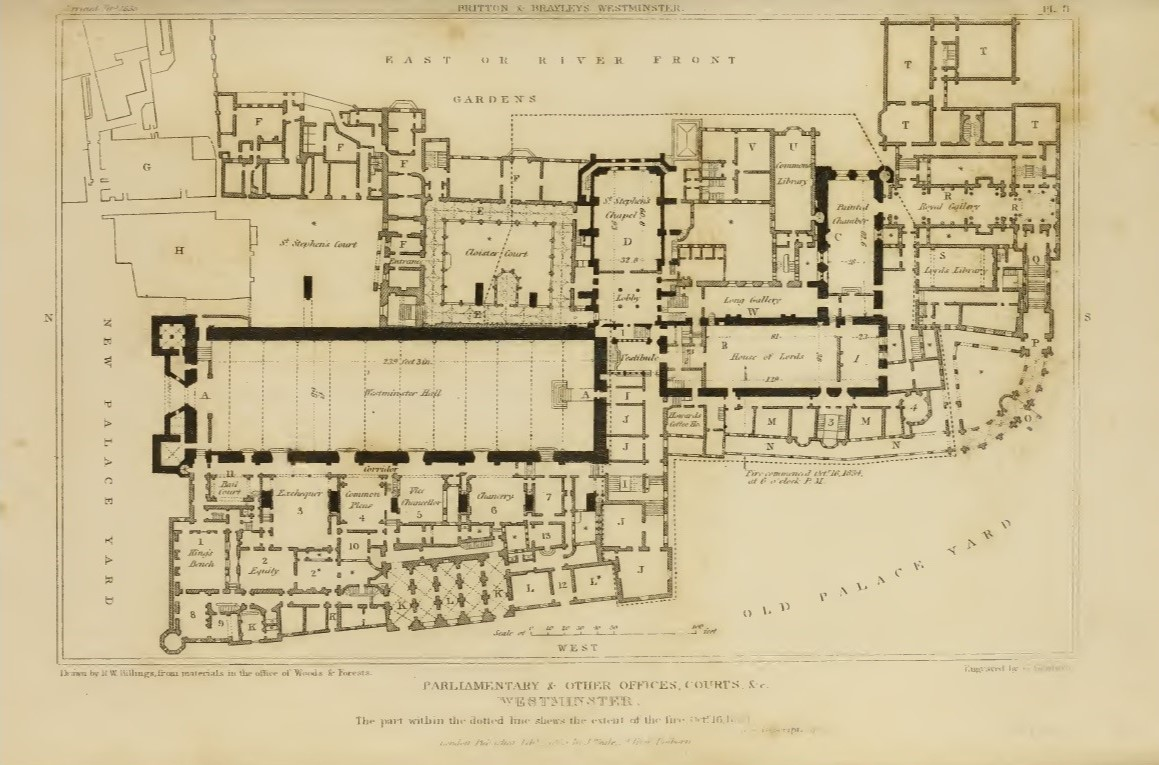
The Speaker's House is in the top left of this pre-1834 plan of the Palace of Westminster

The first Speaker to be granted an official residence was Henry Addington in 1790. Official dinners were given by the Speaker in the crypt under St Stephen's Chapel (the crypt is now St Mary Undercroft). The original Speaker's House adjoined St Stephen's Chapel. The writer Theodore Hook was frequently entertained there by Sir Charles Manners-Sutton during his speakership. The Speaker's House was rebuilt by James Wyatt between 1802 and 1808. Wyatt also constructed a new group of offices at the east side of Old Palace Yard; these buildings and the Speaker's House were the only completed structures of his masterplan for the palace before his death in 1813. The total cost of these two projects was in excess of £200,000 (equivalent to £15,897,289 in 2025).

Speaker Charles Abbot wrote in his diary in 1803 that the "rebuilding and altering the Speaker's House, which Mr. Wyatt had promised to complete before winter, proceeded very slowly", but he had still been able to host parliamentarians for dinners. At a dinner at the home of Lord Camden in 1808, The 1st Duke of Cumberland and Teviotdale told Abbot that the Whig MP George Tierney would be complaining in the Commons about the expenditure of £70,000 on the Speaker's House (equivalent to £6,221,621 in 2025). Abbot told Cumberland that Tierney should take the issue up with Wyatt. John Britton, writing in his 1815 book Beauties of England and Wales, describes the Speaker's House as having been greatly altered, enlarged and beautified under the direction of Wyatt and that it was "most exquistly and tastefully ornimated" under Speaker Abbot. Following the fire in 1834, the Speaker's residence was partly located at the nearby Jewel Tower. The Speaker also lived in a house in Eaton Square in Belgravia while the Palace of Westminster was being rebuilt.

=== Present residence ===
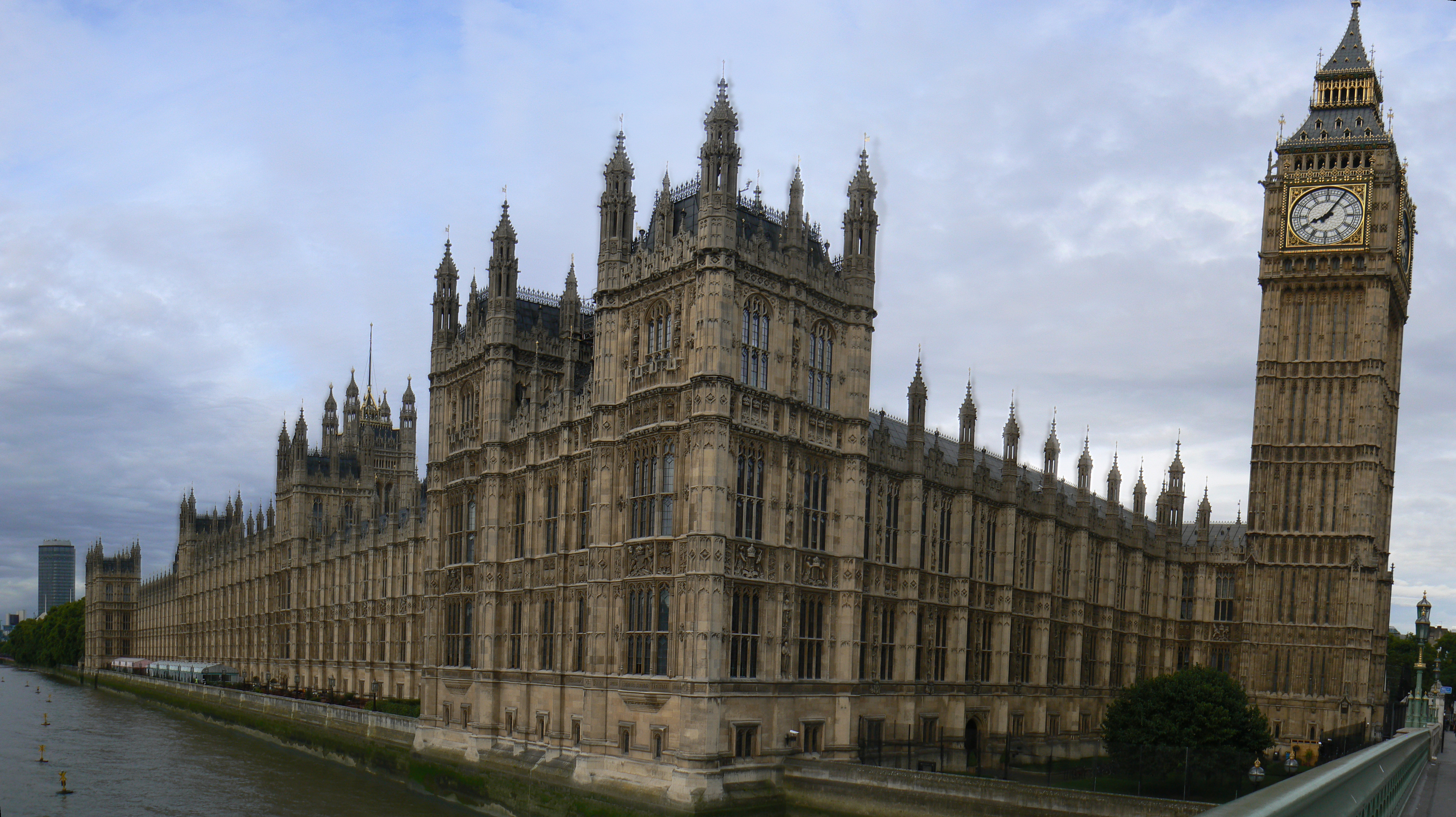
Today, Speaker's House is located at this corner of Palace of Westminster, as seen from Westminster Bridge

After the burning of Parliament in 1834, it was rebuilt by Charles Barry as part of the new Palace of Westminster in the Perpendicular Gothic Revival style. Barry had won the competition to rebuild the palace in 1836, and the foundation stone was laid in 1840. The new residence of the Speaker was completed in 1859, it being one of the last parts of the new Palace of Westminster to be completed. It was rebuilt under the direction of Thomas Quarm, the Clerk of Works, and decorated by John Gregory Crace. The furniture was designed by John Braund, and made by Holland and Sons. The furniture was largely completed by January 1859, with the contract being accepted in August 1858. It is located at the north east corner of the palace.

The residence forms a rough parallelogram measuring 100 by 85 feet (30 by 26 m). The Speaker's House was described in the 1878 book Old and New London as "of considerable extent, comprising from sixty to seventy rooms" with the "staircase, its carvings, tile-paving, and brass-work, is exceedingly effective and elegant, and everywhere there is a large amount of painted and gilded decoration".

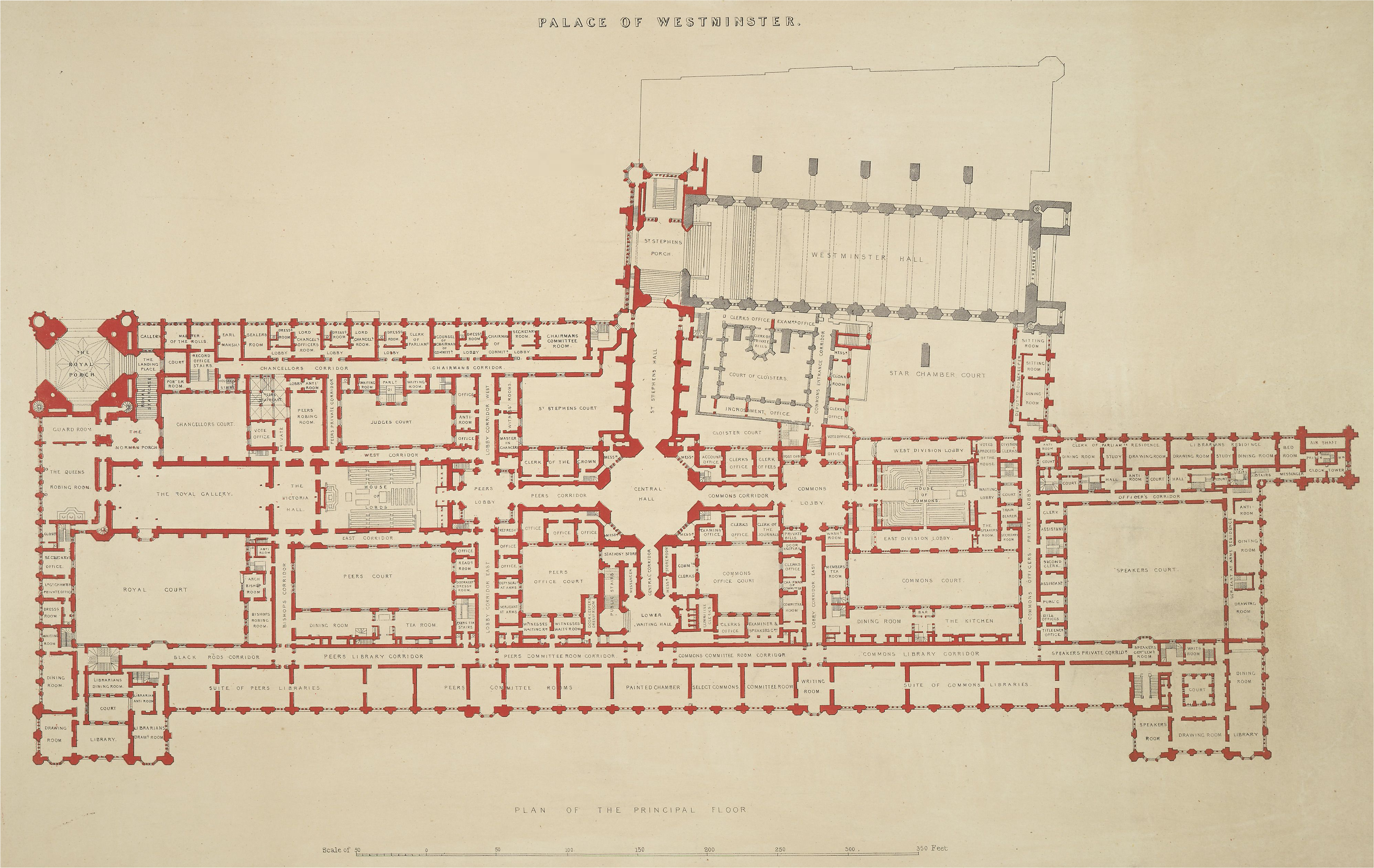
The Speaker's House is in the bottom right of this plan of the rebuilt Palace of Westminster

Speaker's Court forms the entrance to the Speaker's House and, looking south, is situated on the left-hand side of New Palace Yard. The court is entered by two "not very imposing" archways, as described in an article in The Illustrated London News, which said that "spacious as the area which presents itself, and lofty as are the buildings which form its four sides, the appearance of the house as a whole is not particularly striking". An elaborate porch forms the main entrance of the house, surmounted by oriel windows. Sculptured lions surmount the four angles of the entrance with a relief of the House of Commons mace. Five quatrefoils enriched with roses run along the edge of the porch. A band above the arch is inscribed with the Christian text "Domine salvum fac regem" ("Lord save the king"). Inside the porch ceiling panels are decorated with the armorial bearings of previous Speakers and the entrance hall is richly decorated, paved with Mintons floor tiles and stone panels with carved fretwork. A grand staircase leads from the entrance hall; tall standard lamps adorn the steps at the bottom of the stairs. The staircase reaches a landing and branches off on either side, enclosing the hall. The balustrades along the staircase are moulded in highly polished brass. The cornice of the hall features armorial shields of the Speakers, with the gilded and painted armorial bearings of England at their centre. A skylight above the hall is made of decorative stained glass.

An audience room leads to large cloisters. The Illustrated London News described the cloisters as "one of the chief, if not the chief, ornaments of the whole building". The cloisters are each 40 feet (12 m) long, 8 feet (2.4 m) wide, and 10 feet (3.0 m) in height; with the roof of the cloisters decorated with fan-groined arches with tracery. The Illustrated London News described the tracery as spread over the cloisters "like a network of stone, giving the most exquisite effects of light and shade; while four lanterns in each cloister light it with a soft, mellow richness that becomes the place and its associations". The cloisters overlook the inner quadrangle of the Speaker's Court and have canopied Gothic stained-glass windows. The windows depict the name, date, and coats of arms of every known speaker.

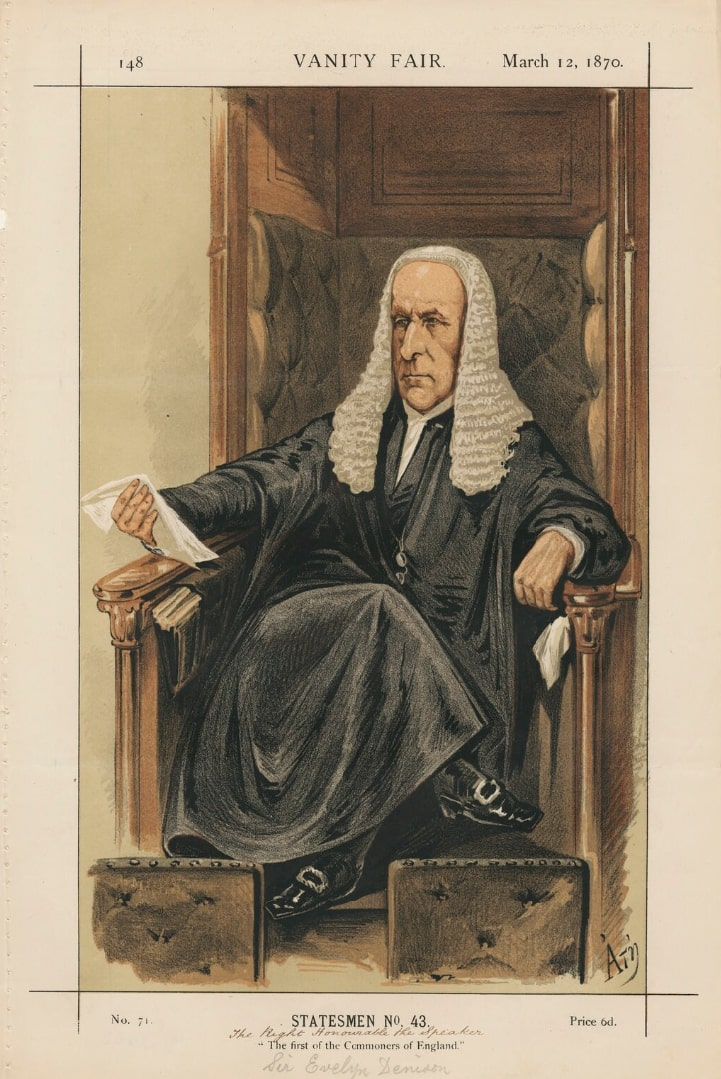
John Evelyn Denison, the first occupant of the rebuilt Speaker's House

The principal rooms of the Speaker's residence at the time of the construction of the House in the 1850s were the state dining room, drawing room, ordinary dining room, and morning and waiting rooms. The rooms are decorated in the Gothic Revival style of the rebuilt Palace of Westminster. The state dining room is 43 feet long, 23 feet wide and 21 feet high. Its ceiling is divided into richly carved and gilded bays, with square panels bearing the arms of the Houses of York and Lancaster, and the Portcullis of Westminster. The arms of former Speakers are emblazoned on the cornice of the dining room. A full-length portrait of Speaker Charles Shaw-Lefevre, hung over the fireplace at the completion of the house in 1859. The fireplace in the dining room is made of dark grey marble and is a copy of an ancient fireplace at Windsor Castle. It is 8 feet (2.4 m) high and 12 feet (3.7 m) wide. It is richly decorated with emblems of three kingdoms, the arms of Queen Victoria, crowns and the portcullis with the monogram "V.R.". The firedogs of the fireplace are of a lion and a unicorn holding banners.

The Speaker's House was refurbished in the 1980s under Sir Robert Cooke, who served as Special Advisor to the Palace of Westminster from 1979 until 1987. The present state bedroom was created under Cooke; it was created from the drawing room of the adjacent Serjeant-at-Arms house, and linked by a new door to the state dining room. A canopied bed in the Speaker's House is intended for the British monarch to sleep in on the night before their coronation. The bed was sold in the 1950s, and bought back to the House in the 1980s.

== History ==
William IV informed Speaker Charles Manners-Sutton of his intention to occupy Speaker's House for two days prior to his coronation on 8 September 1831. A dispute arose between the Lord Great Chamberlain and Manners-Sutton in 1834. It was the duty of the Lord Great Chamberlain to undress the King the night before his coronation, and to dress him the following morning. In return for this service the Lord Great Chamberlain was entitled to keep as his property the furniture of the room in which the King slept, the silver basin in which the King washed and any night apparel that he had worn. In his position as Deputy Lord Chamberlain, Lord Willoughby d'Eresby laid claim to the effects of the state bedroom of Speaker's House for his service during William IV's coronation. The effects were granted to him by the Board of Claims that arose from the disputed accounts from the King's coronation, and he subsequently took possession of eight tapestry chairs, two tapestry sofas, and two tapestry screens. Though the property claimed by Lord Willoughby belonged to the State, Manners-Sutton bought it back from him, and subsequently made an application to the state for £5,000 compensation for his losses in the 1834 fire and offered them the effects claimed by Lord Willoughby for 500 guineas. The House of Commons appointed a select committee to investigate the compensation claims of Manners-Sutton and other officials of the house and valued the furniture at £480 which he accepted. Before finalising the matter HM Treasury asked Manners-Sutton for the receipt that Lord Willoughby had given him and it could not be procured. Manners-Sutton subsequently petitioned Queen Victoria in 1842 for £10,000 compensation for his losses in the fire as his losses had occurred in a royal palace by the negligence of Crown servants. The case was argued before the Lord Chancellor, John Copley, who ruled that Manners-Sutton's claim was unsustainable as the Crown could not be held responsible for the negligence of its agents.

Painted portraits of Speakers dating back to the 1800s are displayed in a function room in the residence. The oldest portrait is of Thomas More, who served as Speaker in 1523; there is a gap until the portrait of Speaker Richard Onslow who served from 1566 to 1567. There are five portraits of Speakers from the 16th century, 13 from the 17th century, and 12 from the 18th century. The series of portraits of 19th-century Speakers is complete.

The Speaker formally proceeds from Speaker's House to the House of Commons to start each day's parliamentary session. John Evelyn Denison was the first occupant of the rebuilt Speaker's House in 1857.

The basements of Speaker's House and of the residence of the Serjeant at Arms of the House of Commons were flooded by the River Thames in January 1928 after the failure of the water ejector system under Speaker's Green. Speaker's House was bombed in The Blitz in April 1941. A large water tank was damaged but there were no casualties. The windows of the House of Commons Library and terrace were smashed. A private flat was created for the Speaker's living accommodation on the first and second floors of Speaker's house in 1943.

During their 1956 visit to the UK, the Soviet First Secretary Nikita Khrushchev and the Soviet Premier Nikolai Bulganin attended a dinner at Speaker's House with Speaker William Morrison and 39 others, including Prime Minister Anthony Eden, Leader of the House of Commons Rab Butler, Foreign Secretary Selwyn Lloyd, Leader of the Labour Party Hugh Gaitskell and Lord Chancellor Viscount Kilmuir.

Queen Elizabeth The Queen Mother visited George Thomas five times at Speaker's House during his speakership. Queen Elizabeth II and Prince Philip, Duke of Edinburgh had dinner with Speaker Betty Boothroyd at Speaker's House in November 1996. William and Ffion Hague's wedding reception was held at Speaker's House in December 1997. Boothroyd met her waxwork dummy at Speaker's House in June 1998 before its unveiling at Madame Tussauds. Michael Martin spent £724,600 refurbishing Speaker's House between the year of his appointment as Speaker in 2000 and early 2008. £992,000 was spent on enhanced security for the residence and on the garden of the property. Speaker's House was refurbished by Speaker John Bercow in 2009 at an estimated cost of £20,000. Bercow was elected Speaker after the resignation of Michael Martin in the wake of the MPs expenses scandal. Bercow had announced that he would not claim the allowance for a second home. The cost was funded by the Parliamentary Estates Directorate. The changes were made to accommodate Bercow's wife and three young children. Bercow said, "It's a fantastic apartment but it's not altogether child-friendly". One of the study rooms in the residence became a playroom. Bercow personally paid for a children's climbing frame and a Wendy house for Speaker's Green. Bercow's wife Sally described the view from Speaker's House as "incredibly sexy, particularly at night with the moon and the glow from the old gas lamps". £2,000 was spent on beeswax candles in 2016 during Bercow's speakership. Overall expenditure on Speaker's House fell 19.4%, from £626,000 to £504,000, from 2009 to 2016.

The Aber Valley Male Voice Choir celebrated their golden anniversary with a performance at Speaker's House in 2009. Pupils from the London Welsh School sang songs at the door of Speaker's House to celebrate St David's Day in March 2015.

A total of £12,636 was spent to prepare the residence for Sir Lindsay Hoyle when he became Speaker. Some £7,500 was spent on bedding and mattresses; this included the replacement of four damaged or worn mattresses and bedding for "other overnight accommodation provision on the parliamentary estate". In May and June 2020 £89,506 was spent to remove asbestos at Speaker's House.

During the election of the Speaker in 2019 Chris Bryant vowed if elected to host more events for the spouses of parliamentarians at Speaker's House, and to have an event where MPs waited on Parliamentary staff, saying that he would like "to have some kind of event for the staff who run the building...with MPs serving".

The grand piano in the Speaker's House is available for Members of Parliament to play on request. As a "mark of respect" to the House of Commons it has been a long-standing practice that parliamentarians elected for Sinn Féin are not welcome at hospitality functions at the Speaker's House due to their abstentionism from the Commons. The practice was maintained by John Bercow during his speakership when an event to mark the centenary of the 1914 Home Rule Bill was due to be held at his residence with attendees invited by the Irish embassy in London.

== Sources ==
- MacDonagh, Michael (1914). The Speaker of the House. London: Methuen & Co.
