= Eleanor Laing =

British politician and life peer (born 1958)

The Right Honourable The Baroness Laing of Elderslie DBE PC
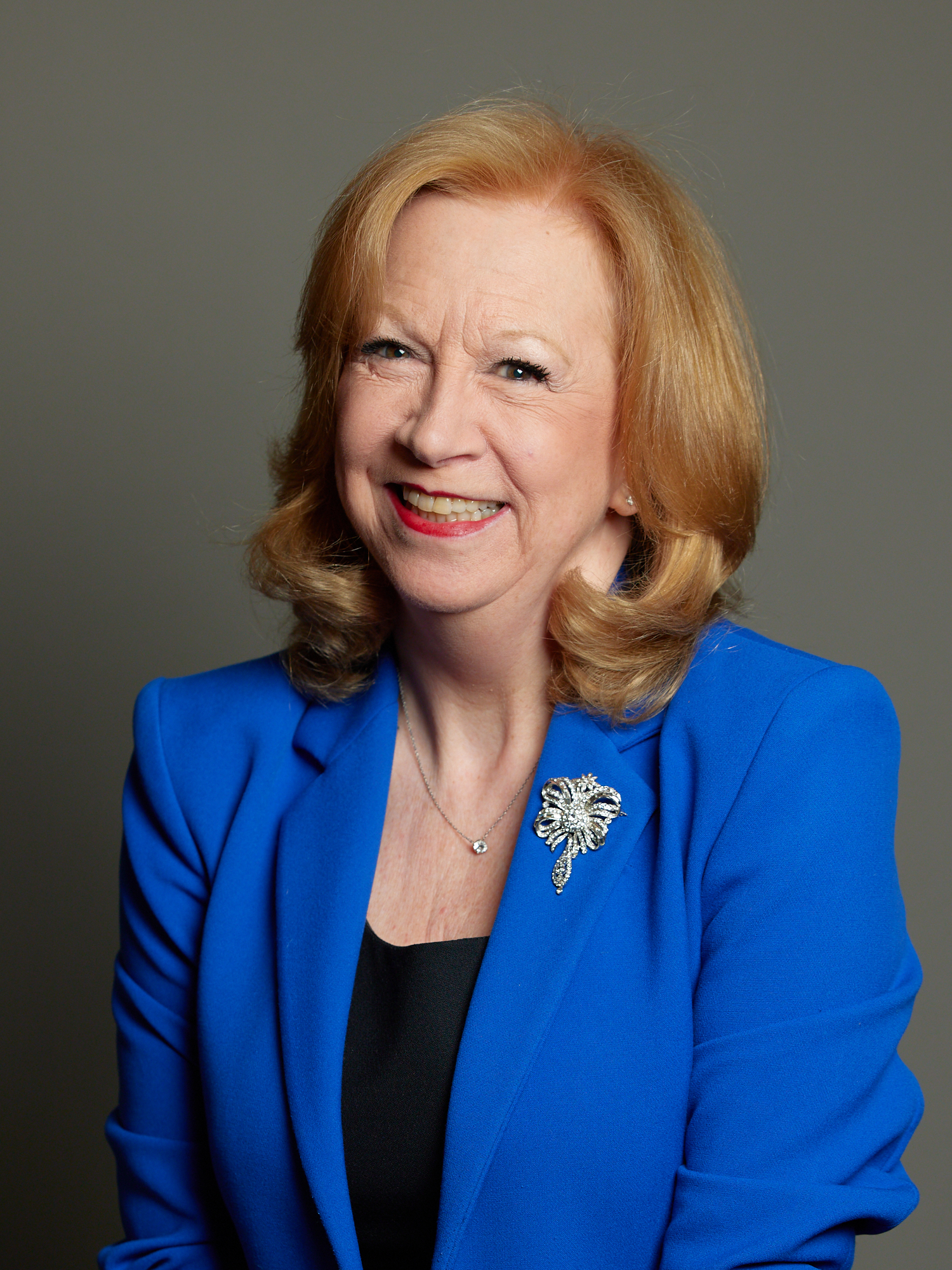
- Official portrait, 2022

Chairman of Ways and Means Deputy Speaker of the House of Commons
- In office 8 January 2020 (Note: On leave from 19 December 2022 to 6 March 2023, and from 26 October 2023 to 31 March 2024, during which Roger Gale served in her absence. Laing did make appearances in the Commons during this period and was presiding for the budget debates in 2024.) – 30 May 2024
- Speaker: Sir Lindsay Hoyle
- Preceded by: Sir Lindsay Hoyle
- Succeeded by: Nus Ghani

First Deputy Chairman of Ways and Means Deputy Speaker of the House of Commons
- In office 16 October 2013 – 19 December 2019
- Speaker: John Bercow; Lindsay Hoyle
- Preceded by: Nigel Evans
- Succeeded by: Rosie Winterton
Shadow portfolios
Shadow Minister for Justice
In office 2 July 2007 – 11 May 2010
Leader	David Cameron
Preceded by	Henry Bellingham
Succeeded by	Maria Eagle
Shadow Secretary of State for Scotland
In office 19 May 2005 – 7 December 2005
Leader	Michael Howard
Preceded by	James Gray
Succeeded by	David Mundell
Shadow Minister for Women and Equalities
In office 15 March 2004 – 2 July 2007
Leader	Michael Howard; David Cameron
Preceded by	Caroline Spelman
Succeeded by	Theresa May
Shadow Minister for Children
In office June 2003 – November 2003
Leader	Iain Duncan Smith
Preceded by	Office established
Succeeded by	Tim Loughton

Member of the House of Lords
- Lord Temporal
- Life peerage 22 August 2024

Member of Parliament for Epping Forest
- In office 1 May 1997 – 30 May 2024
- Preceded by: Steven Norris
- Succeeded by: Neil Hudson

Personal details
- Born: Eleanor Fulton Pritchard; 1 February 1958 (age 68) Paisley, Renfrewshire, Scotland
- Party: Conservative
- Spouse: Alan Laing (div. 2002)
- Children: 1
- Education: University of Edinburgh

Eleanor Fulton Laing, Baroness Laing of Elderslie, DBE, PC (née Pritchard; born 1 February 1958) is a British Conservative Party politician who served as Member of Parliament (MP) for Epping Forest from 1997 to 2024. She served in the shadow cabinets of Michael Howard and David Cameron. From 2013 to 2024, Laing was a Deputy Speaker of the House of Commons and was the first female Chairman of Ways and Means from 2020 to 2024. She had one of the longest tenures in the Speaker's chair. She became a member of the House of Lords in 2024.

Laing stood down from the House of Commons at the 2024 general election and was appointed to the House of Lords.

== Early life and career ==
Eleanor Pritchard was born on 1 February 1958 in Paisley, Renfrewshire, and raised in the nearby village of Elderslie, where her father was a councillor. She was privately educated at St Columba's School, an independent school. Laing graduated from University of Edinburgh with Master of Arts and Bachelor of Laws degrees. She was the first female President of the University of Edinburgh Students' Association. She worked as a solicitor in Edinburgh and the City of London.

At the 1987 general election, Laing stood as the Conservative candidate in Paisley North, coming second with 15.8% of the vote behind the Labour incumbent Allen Adams.

In 1995, she sought selection for Southend West, but was narrowly defeated in the selection process by David Amess, the sitting MP for Basildon.

== Parliamentary career ==
At the 1997 general election, Laing was elected to Parliament as MP for Epping Forest with 45.5% of the vote and a majority of 5,252.

Following the election, she was selected for the Education Select Committee, chaired by Labour's Margaret Hodge. Once in Parliament, Laing signed up to the Eurosceptic wing of the party, first supporting Michael Howard then William Hague for the Conservative leadership.

Laing sponsored the motion for lowering the homosexual age of consent to 16 in June 1998, saying in Parliament that: "Nothing that is being proposed tonight is in any way encouraging physical sexual activity among young people before they are sufficiently mature. It is nonsense to say that there cannot be equality between 16-year-old boys and 16-year-old girls. Young people need protection, but young people are not protected by being made into criminals". Labour MPs paid tribute for Laing for speaking against the majority view of the then Parliamentary Conservative Party, of whom 110 of their 165 MPs voted against the measure.

She has been an opponent of devolution, and criticised the Blair government on many of the details of the transfer of power. In December 2000, she was appointed as opposition Scottish spokeswoman.

At the 2001 general election, Laing was re-elected as MP for Epping Forest with an increased vote share of 49.1% and an increased majority of 8,426.

Laing voted against the repeal of Section 28 in 2003.

Laing first entered the shadow cabinet in 2004 as Shadow Minister for Women and Equalities under the leadership of Michael Howard, after previously serving as Shadow Minister of Children from June to November 2003. Whilst continuing in this role, Laing became Shadow Secretary of State for Scotland, serving briefly from May 2005, shortly after the 2005 general election, to December 2005 when David Cameron came to power as Leader of the Opposition.

Laing was again re-elected at the 2005 general election with an increased vote share of 53% and an increased majority of 14,358.

Laing continued as Shadow Women and Equalities Minister until a July 2007 reshuffle, when she became Shadow Minister for Justice, a role she remained in until the 2010 general election.

At the 2010 general election, Laing was again re-elected, with an increased vote share of 54% and an increased majority of 15,131. After the election, and the formation of the Cameron–Clegg coalition, Laing did not receive a government post, thus returning to the backbenches.

In 2012, Laing voted against the third reading of the proposed House of Lords Reform Bill 2012, and opposed a referendum on Scottish independence. She also spoke in favour of a referendum on the United Kingdom's membership of the European Union, and paid tribute to Margaret Thatcher and her legacy during a Commons session dedicated to tributes to the late former Prime Minister, which took place shortly after her death.

Laing criticised the manner in which the Marriage (Same Sex Couples) Act 2013 was introduced by arguing "social change should come about by evolution, not by diktat from the top of government" and subsequently abstained from voting on it.

=== Deputy Speaker (2013–2024) ===
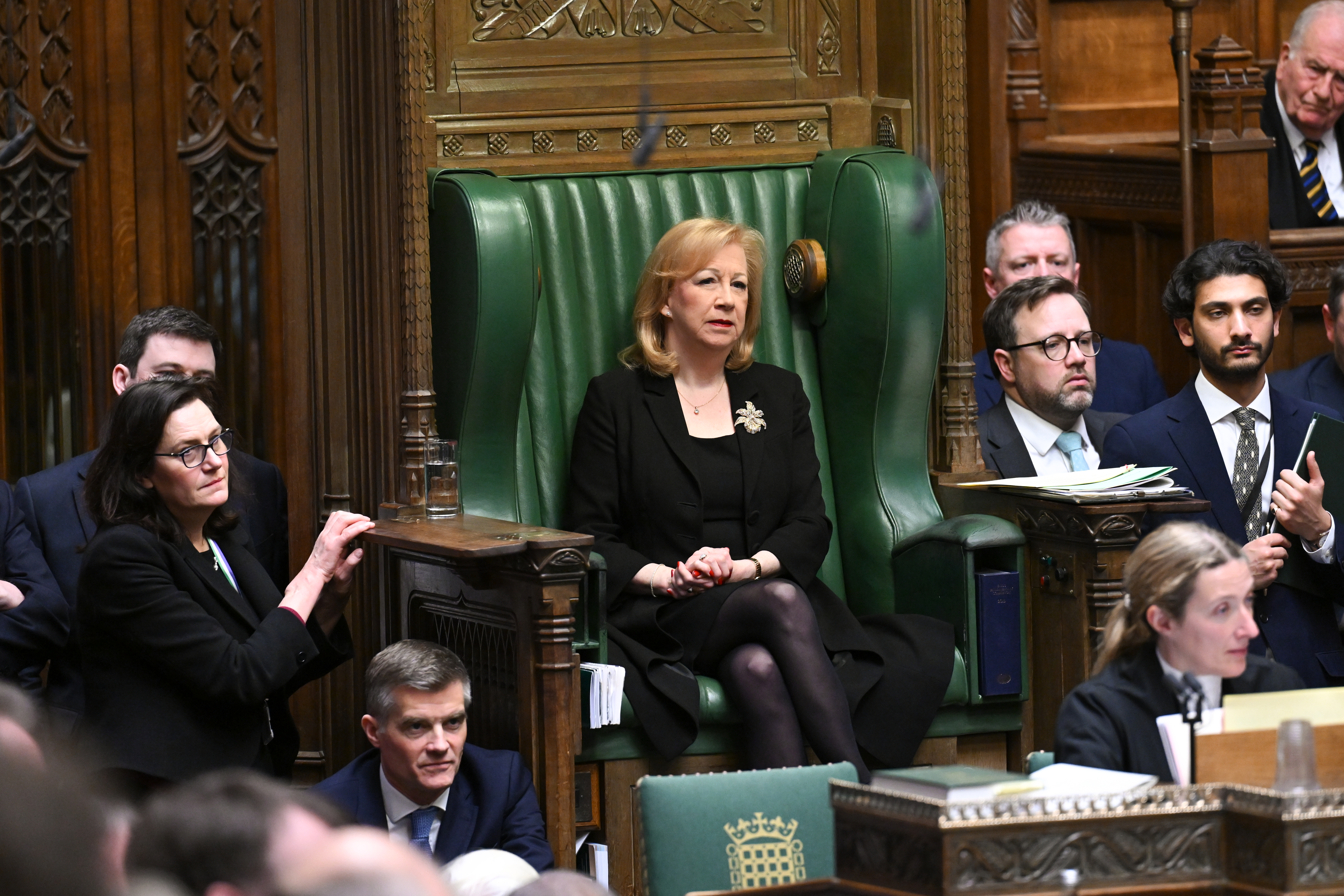
Laing presiding over the March 2024 budget

In May 2013, the First Deputy Chairman of Ways and Means, Nigel Evans, was arrested on suspicion of rape and sexual assault. He was acquitted of those charges, but resigned from his position in the chair on 10 September 2013. On 16 October, Laing was elected to succeed Evans as the First Deputy Chair, the holder of which post is one of the Deputy Speakers of the House.

At the 2015 general election, Laing was again re-elected with an increased vote share of 54.8% and an increased majority of 17,978.

In January 2016, Laing criticised Tulip Siddiq, who was seven months pregnant at the time, for breaking the customs of the House by leaving a debate shortly after speaking. Siddiq had already been in the debate for two hours and left at 14:30 to eat. According to witnesses, Laing told Siddiq not to use her pregnancy as an excuse for her behaviour.

Laing voted leave in the 2016 Brexit referendum.

At the snap 2017 general election, Laing was again re-elected with an increased vote share of 62% and an increased majority of 18,243. Laing was again re-elected at the 2019 general election with an increased vote share of 64.4% and an increased majority of 22,173, an election which she described as "very nasty".

Laing stood in the 2019 Speaker election, to replace John Bercow, campaigning on restoring trust to the House of Commons. Laing was critical of Bercow, and called his impartiality into question, pledging to do things differently and bring kindness to the Speaker's chair. Laing lost to Lindsay Hoyle, but declared her intention to stand to replace him as Deputy Speaker of the House of Commons. She was elected by her fellow MPs, and became the first woman to be the Chairman of Ways and Means.

Laing took a leave of absence from December 2022 after undergoing surgery, and returned to the chair during the week of 6 March 2023. Her leave of absence was extended to 31 March 2024, but Laing continued in her duties in the chair. Roger Gale served as deputy speaker while she was absent.

In June 2023, former prime minister Boris Johnson called for Bernard Jenkin to resign from his participation in the Commons Select Committee of Privileges, the Select Committee which investigated whether Johnson had misled parliament, when it was reported by the Guido Fawkes website that Jenkin had attended an event on 8 December 2020 in parliament. This was a "drinks party" held by Laing in her office, while such events were banned under the current guidelines. In November 2023, the police investigation into the "drinks party" attended by Laing was closed, with the "threshold for fines not being met".

In 2023, Laing was investigated by the Parliamentary Commissioner for Standards, Daniel Greenberg, for "actions causing significant damage to the reputation of the House as a whole, or of its Members generally".

In May 2024, she announced she would stand down at the 2024 general election. Having served as an MP for 27 years, she is one of the longest-serving female MPs in British history. She was succeeded in the Epping Forest seat unusually by a sitting MP, Neil Hudson, whose Penrith and The Border constituency had been abolished at the election.

=== Peerage ===
After standing down as an MP, Laing was nominated for a life peerage in the 2024 Dissolution Honours. She was created Baroness Laing of Elderslie, of Epping Forest in the County of Essex, on 22 August 2024.

== Expenses ==
After details of MPs' expense claims were released by the press in 2009 it was shown that Laing had avoided paying £180,000 capital gains tax on the sale of her Westminster flat by declaring it as her primary residence. This was due to its having a higher value than her constituency home, making it her primary residence under capital gains tax rules. However she had registered the flat as her second home with the Parliamentary Fees Office, and by doing so had claimed through her Additional Costs Allowance some of the interest due on her mortgage. Laing's constituency is Epping Forest, which neighbours London and less than an hour's journey by tube. When questioned, she said that prior to the sale of the flat she had sought the advice of her solicitor. Laing was cleared by the Legg Inquiry; nonetheless, she voluntarily repaid £25,000 as a "moral gesture". As a result of the issue over her expenses, an unsuccessful attempt was made to deselect her by her constituency party, led by the Leader of Epping Forest District Council.

== Personal life ==
Laing is divorced with one son, born in 2001.

Laing is a supporter of Rangers F.C., and is a vice-chairman of the Westminster Parliamentary Rangers Supporters' Club.

She was made a Dame Commander of the Order of the British Empire in the 2018 Queen's Birthday Honours List.

Parliament of the United Kingdom
Preceded by Steven Norris	Member of Parliament for Epping Forest; 1997–2024	Succeeded by Neil Hudson
Preceded by Nigel Evans	First Deputy Chair of Ways and Means; 2013–2019	Succeeded by Dame Rosie Winterton
Preceded by Lindsay Hoyle	Chair of Ways and Means; 2020–2024	Succeeded by Nus Ghani
Political offices
Preceded by Office created	Shadow Minister for Children; 2003	Succeeded by Tim Loughton
Preceded by Caroline Spelman	Shadow Minister for Women and Equality; 2004–2007	Succeeded by Theresa May
Preceded by James Gray	Shadow Secretary of State for Scotland; 2005	Succeeded by David Mundell
