= Lindsay Hoyle =

British politician (born 1957)

The Right Honourable Sir Lindsay Hoyle MP
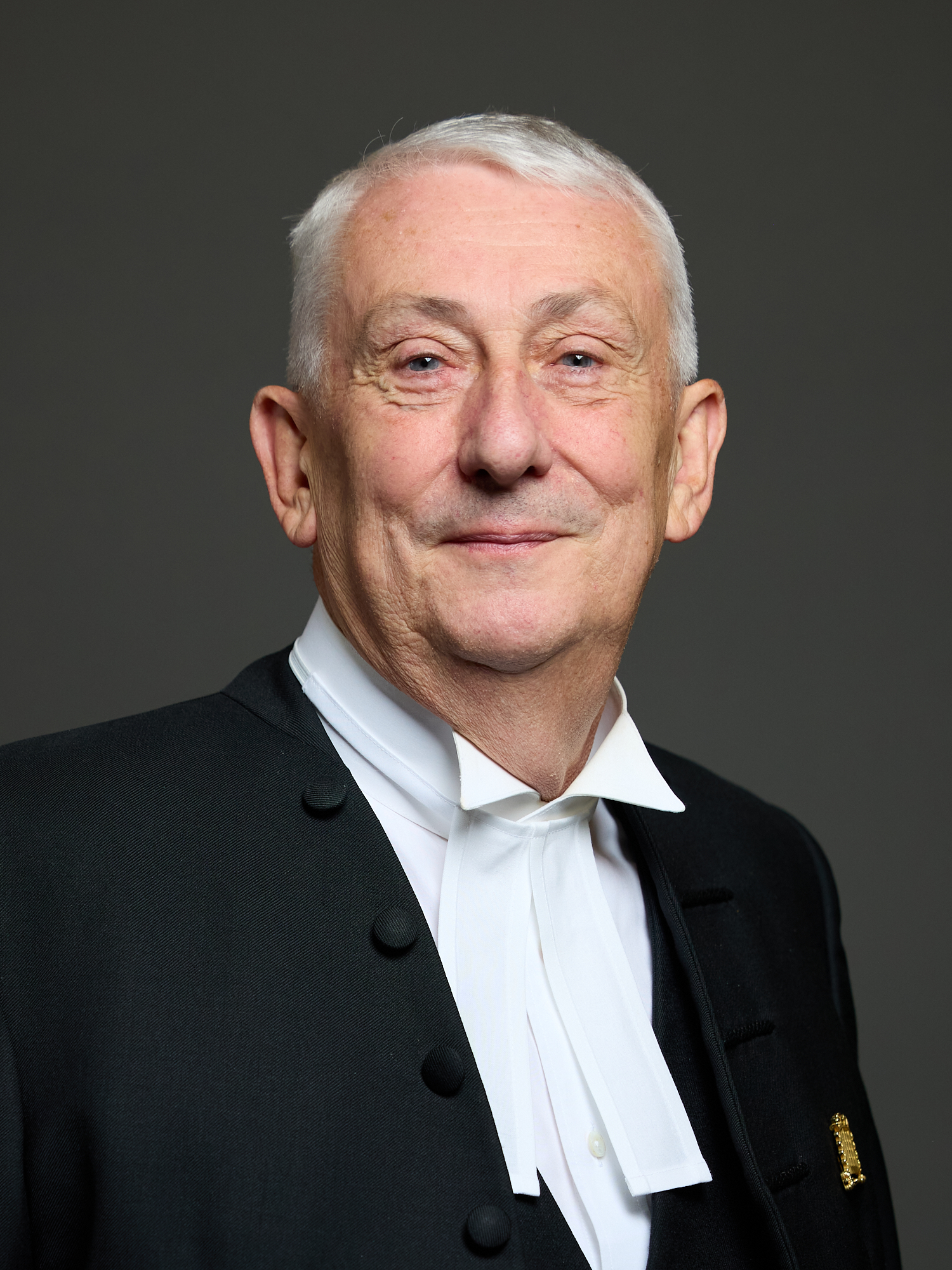
- Official portrait, 2024

Speaker of the House of Commons
- Incumbent
- Assumed office 4 November 2019
- Monarchs: Elizabeth II; Charles III
- Prime Minister: Boris Johnson; Liz Truss; Rishi Sunak; Keir Starmer; Andy Burnham
- Preceded by: John Bercow

Deputy Speaker of the House of Commons Chairman of Ways and Means
- In office 8 June 2010 – 4 November 2019
- Speaker: John Bercow
- Preceded by: Alan Haselhurst
- Succeeded by: Eleanor Laing

Member of Parliament for Chorley
- Incumbent
- Assumed office 1 May 1997
- Preceded by: Den Dover
- Majority: 20,575 (60.6%)

Chorley Borough Councillor for Adlington
- In office 1 May 1980 – 7 May 1998
- Preceded by: A. Moss
- Succeeded by: Catherine Hoyle

Personal details
- Born: Lindsay Harvey Hoyle; 10 June 1957 (age 69) Adlington, Lancashire, England
- Party: Speaker (since 2019)
- Other political affiliations: Labour (before 2019)
- Spouses: Lynda Fowler (m. 1974; div. 1982) Catherine Swindley (m. 1993)
- Children: 2
- Parent: Doug Hoyle (father)
- Occupation: Politician; businessman

Sir Lindsay Harvey Hoyle (born 10 June 1957) is a British politician who has served as Speaker of the House of Commons since 2019 and as Member of Parliament (MP) for Chorley since 1997. Before his election as speaker, he was a member of the Labour Party.

As a Labour MP, Hoyle served as Chairman of Ways and Means and a deputy speaker to John Bercow from 2010 to 2019, before being elected as Speaker on 4 November 2019. Hoyle was unanimously re-elected as Speaker after both the 2019 general election and the 2024 general election.

Hoyle was appointed a Knight Bachelor in the 2018 New Year Honours for parliamentary and political services.

== Early life and career ==
Lindsay Hoyle was born on 10 June 1957 in Adlington, the son of the future Labour MP Doug Hoyle (later Lord Hoyle) and Pauline Spencer. He went to Adlington County School and Lord's College in Bolton. Prior to being elected as an MP, he ran his own textile and screen printing business.As a child Hoyle’s nickname was Linseed, a play on the words Linseed Oil, sounding similar to his name Lindsay Hoyle

In the 1980 local elections, Hoyle was elected as the Labour councillor for the ward of Adlington on Chorley Borough Council, defeating the sitting Conservative. He was re-elected four times, and served as Deputy Leader from 1994 to 1997. After being elected as an MP at the 1997 general election, he ended his time on the council as the annual mayor before stepping down at the local election in 1998.

== Parliamentary career ==
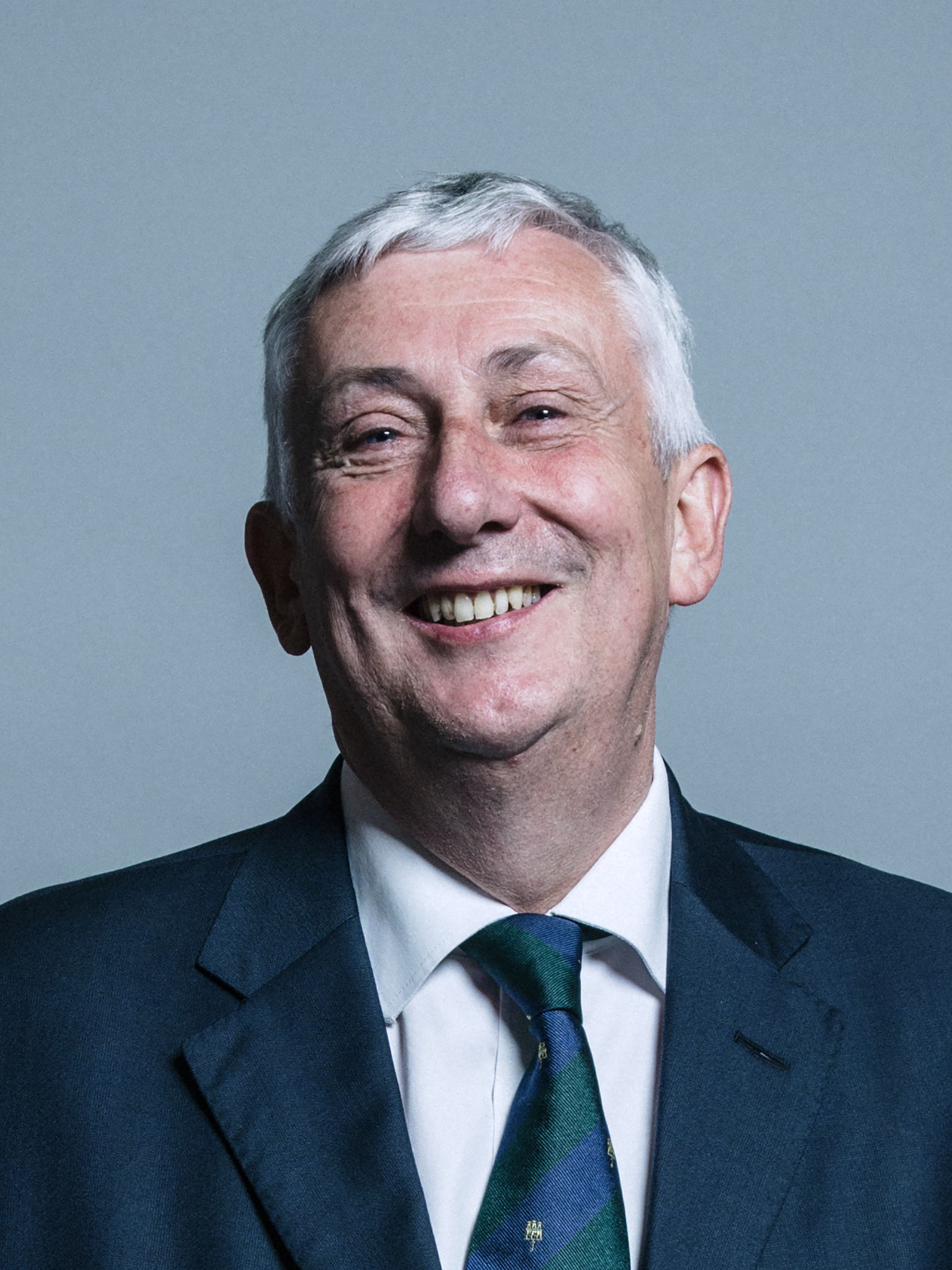
Official portrait, 2017

In February 1996, Hoyle was chosen as the Labour candidate for Chorley at the 1997 general election; he was elected to Parliament as MP for Chorley with 53% of the vote and a majority of 9,870.

In the days after the death of Diana, Princess of Wales, in August 1997, Hoyle asked for a new national children's hospital to be built as a memorial to her. A few days later, Hoyle wrote to airport operator BAA, operators of London Heathrow Airport, urging them to change the airport's name to Diana, Princess of Wales Airport. However, neither proposal was carried out.

Hoyle served as a member of the Trade and Industry Committee (later the Business Committee) from 1998 to 2010 and as a member of the European Scrutiny Committee from 2005 to 2010. He was previously the Honorary President of the All-Party British Gibraltar Group in Parliament (of which his father was the Treasurer) and a Vice Chair of the All-Party British Virgin Islands Group.

Hoyle was re-elected as MP for Chorley at the 2001 general election with a decreased vote share of 52.3% and a decreased majority of 8,444. He was again re-elected at the 2005 general election with a decreased vote share of 50.7% and a decreased majority of 7,625.

Hoyle clashed with then Prime Minister Tony Blair over issues such as Gibraltar and tuition fees. Regarding those clashes, Hoyle would say "I'm not anti-Tony; he made us electable and won three times. But there are principles and promises you don't break".

Hoyle voted against the Lisbon Treaty in 2008. He is one of the few MPs who have not revealed whether they voted Leave or Remain in the June 23, 2016 United Kingdom European Union membership referendum.

=== Chairman of Ways and Means ===
At the 2010 general election, Hoyle was again re-elected with a decreased vote share of 43.2% and a decreased majority of 2,593.

Hoyle was elected Deputy Speaker of the House of Commons and Chairman of Ways and Means on 8 June 2010, the first time this appointment had been made by ballot of MPs, rather than by nomination of the Leader of the House. He was appointed to the Privy Council in January 2013.

On 20 March 2013, Hoyle won wide public acclaim for his handling of the Budget proceedings, which were frequently interrupted by jeering MPs.

Hoyle was again re-elected at the 2015 general election, with an increased vote share of 45.1% and an increased majority of 4,530.

In February 2017, Hoyle scolded SNP MPs for singing the European Anthem during the vote for the Brexit bill in the House of Commons, stating that he did not want parliament to turn into a sing-off. The same night, he had a clash with former Scottish First Minister Alex Salmond in a heated exchange over whether Hoyle had cut off an SNP MP while speaking.

In March 2017, Hoyle called on social media companies to take swifter action to crack down on offensive posts, arguing that "it could damage democracy and deter women from certain backgrounds from becoming MPs".

Hoyle was in the Speaker's Chair during the terrorist attack in Westminster on 22 March 2017, and the subsequent suspension and lockdown of the Commons.

At the snap 2017 general election, Hoyle was again re-elected with an increased vote share of 55.3% and an increased majority of 7,512.

Hoyle was appointed a Knight Bachelor in the 2018 New Year Honours for parliamentary and political services.

=== Speaker of the House of Commons (2019–present) ===
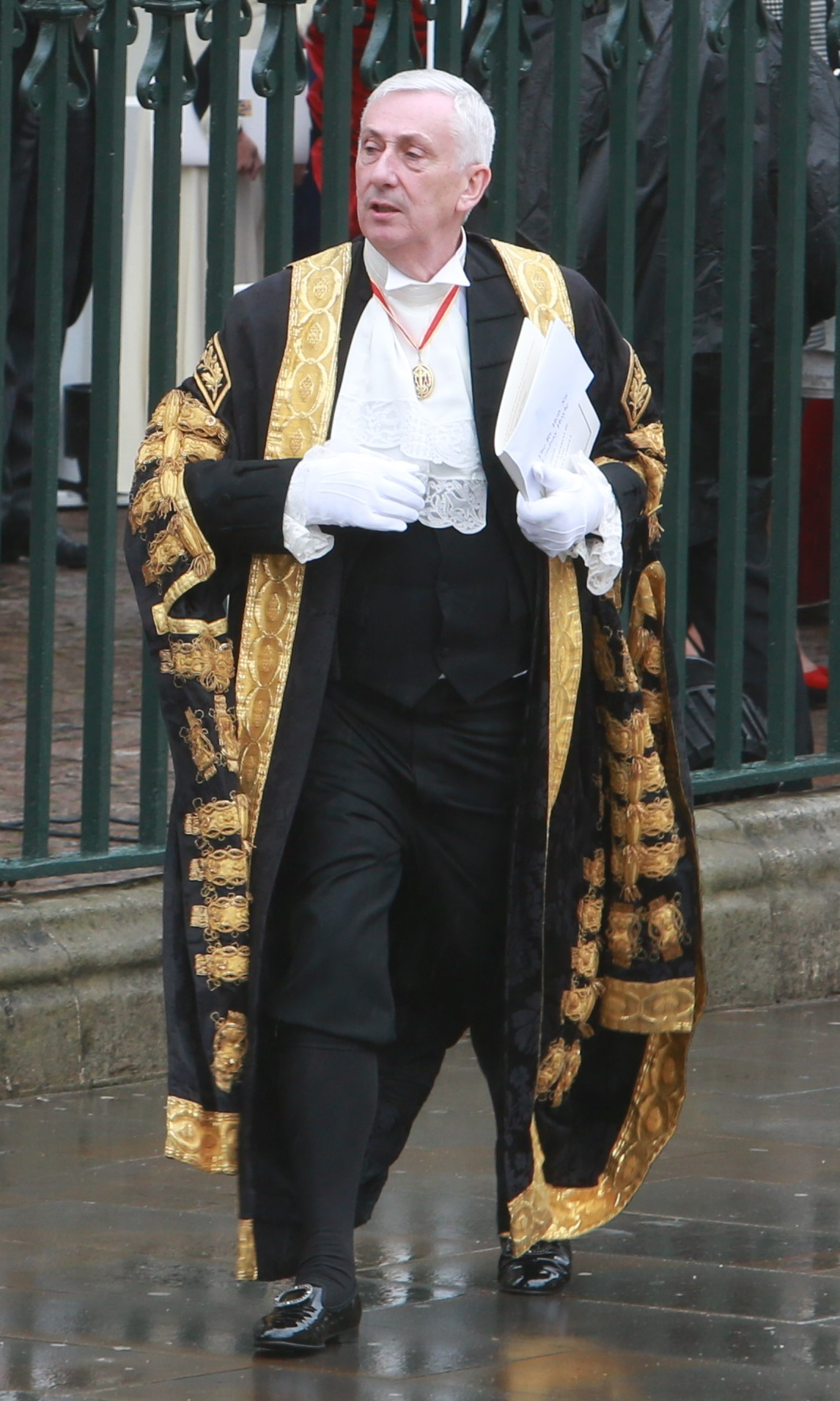
Hoyle during the Coronation of Charles III and Camilla in 2023

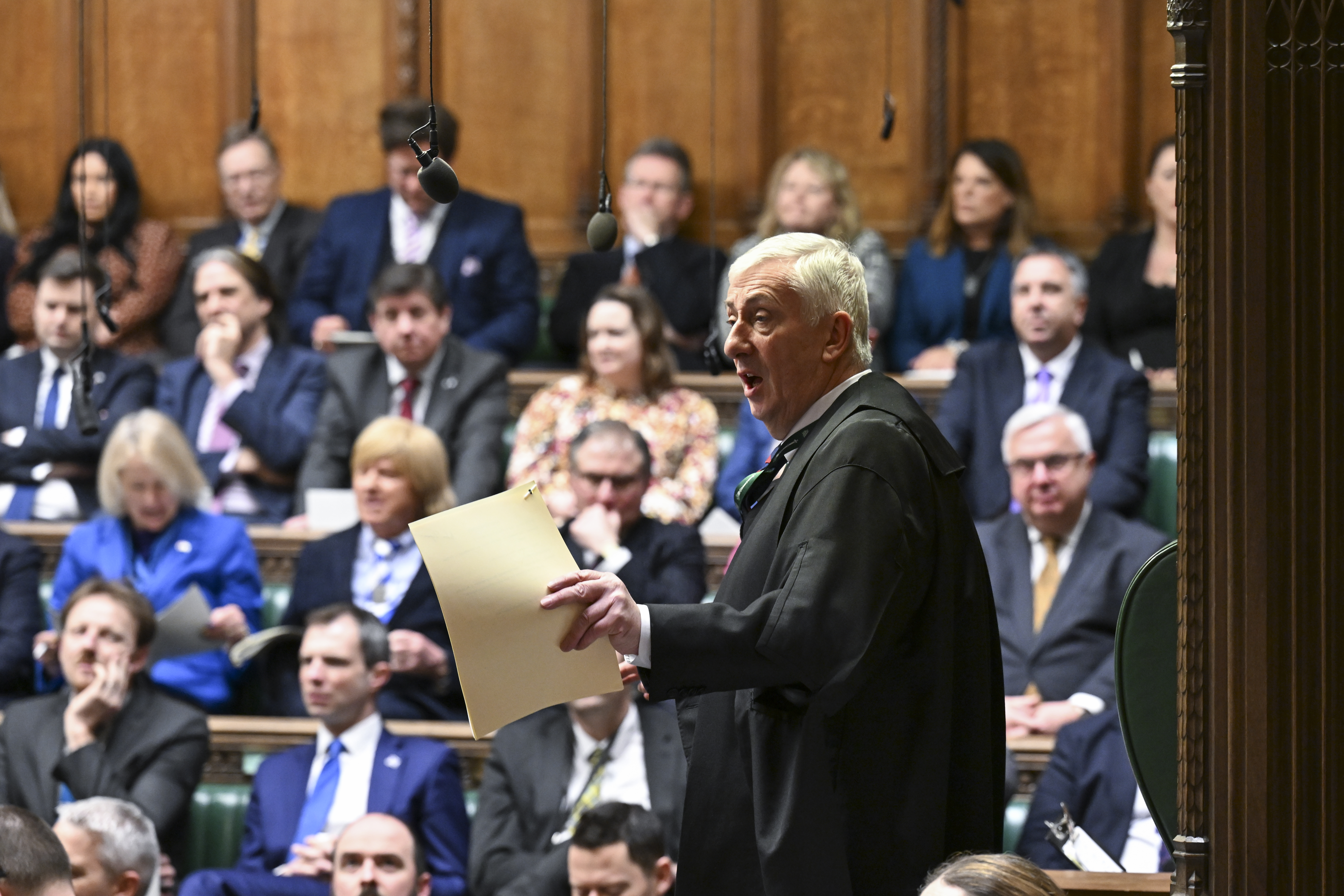
Hoyle in the Speaker's Chair in February 2024

On 4 November 2019, Hoyle entered the election for Speaker to replace John Bercow. In the days leading up to the election, Hoyle was consistently seen by the media as the front runner. He maintained a substantial lead in the first, second, and third ballots of the election, but without reaching the required 50% to win outright.

Hoyle was elected Speaker on the fourth ballot, defeating Chris Bryant and winning 325 votes out of a total of 540 cast. Hoyle then duly received royal approbation in the House of Lords. In accordance with convention that the Speaker's post is strictly non-partisan, following the election Hoyle rescinded his Labour membership.

In his acceptance speech, Hoyle stated that "this House will change, but it will change for the better", and stated that he would be a "transparent" Speaker, also pledging to take the welfare of House of Commons staff seriously.

At the 2019 general election, Hoyle was again re-elected with an increased vote share of 67.3% and an increased majority of 17,392.

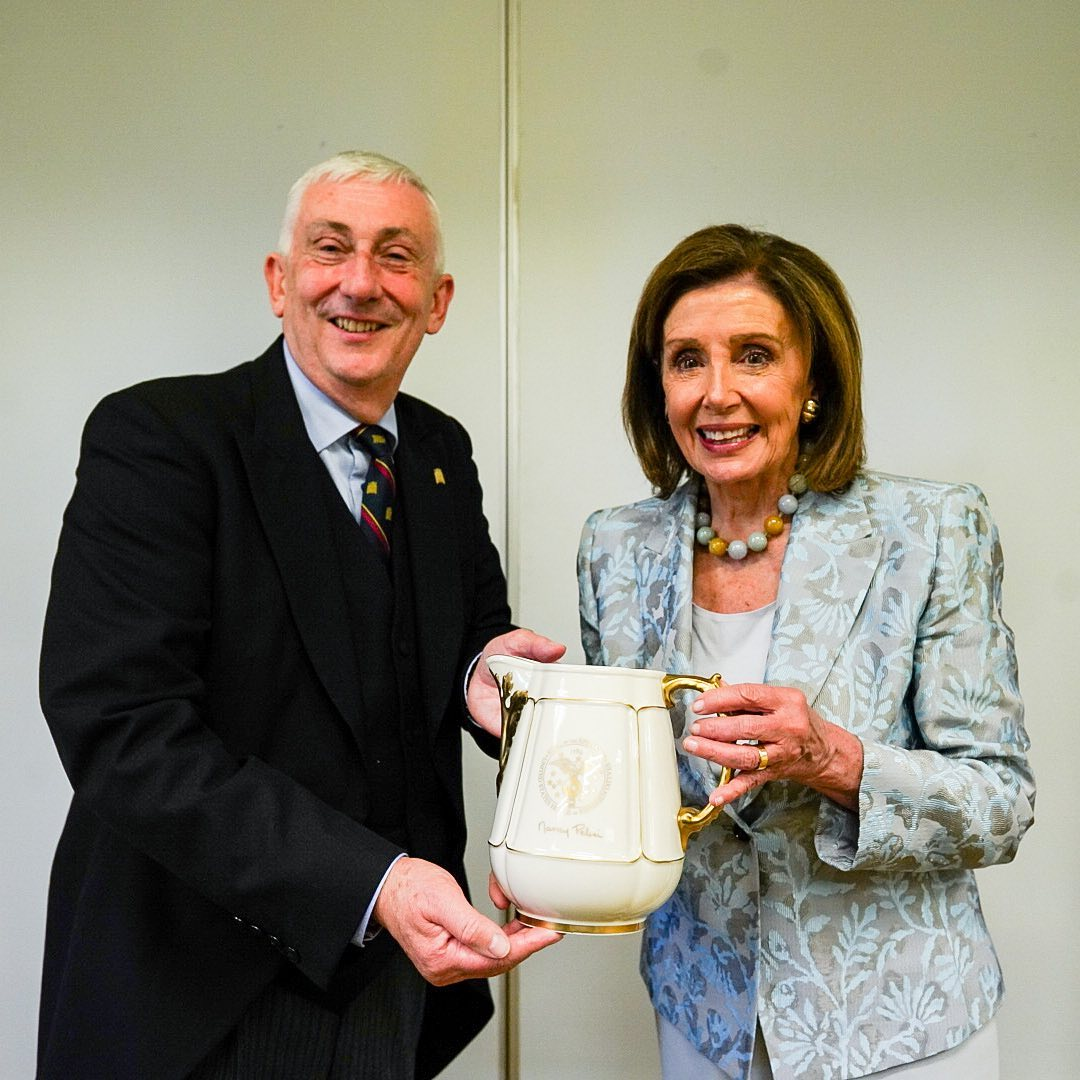
Hoyle with Nancy Pelosi, Speaker of the United States House of Representatives, at the 20th G7 Speaker's Meeting in 2021.

On 16 October 2021, Hoyle accompanied Boris Johnson, Keir Starmer and Priti Patel in laying wreaths at the church in Leigh-on-Sea, Essex where MP David Amess was murdered the day before.

In September 2022, Hoyle described the state funeral of Queen Elizabeth II as "the most important event the world will ever see". Hoyle's comments received criticism. Graham Smith, CEO of the republican campaign group Republic, responded by saying that it was "one of the most stupid things the world has ever heard". In the Indy100, Liam O'Dell wrote that Hoyle was ignoring current issues like the ongoing cost of living crisis and Russian invasion of Ukraine.

In December 2022, Hoyle voiced opposition to his former party's plan of replacing the House of Lords with an elected upper chamber.

On 9 May 2023, Hoyle unveiled two new stained glass windows in the Speaker's House, at the Palace of Westminster. One featuring his new personal coat of arms, with a rugby league ball, bees and Lancashire roses. The other window celebrates Britain's Coat of Arms of all three Crown Dependencies and all sixteen British Overseas Territories. Hoyle said at the unveiling the windows were and "will forever be tangible reminders of the strong, close links between the United Kingdom, the overseas territories and the crown dependencies". Adding "The two windows represent part of our United Kingdom family".

Hoyle was again re-elected in the 2024 general election (Note: As Speaker, Hoyle did not campaign on any political issues and was shown on the ballot paper as "the Speaker seeking re-election.") with an increased vote share of 74.3% and an increased majority of 20,575. On 9 July 2024 he was re-elected unopposed as speaker.

=== Controversies ===
==== Gaza early day motion controversy ====
On 21 February 2024, Conservative MP William Wragg tabled an Early day motion (EDM) in the House of Commons stating "That this House has no confidence in Mr Speaker". By 20 March the EDM had gained the support of 92 MPs, including 1922 Committee chairman Sir Graham Brady and parliamentary leader of the SNP Stephen Flynn. The motion effectively requests the Speaker to resign from his role. An SNP motion calling for an immediate ceasefire in Gaza had been submitted on one of the rare opposition days allotted to them. Hoyle was accused of breaking long-standing convention rules of the House and ignoring his own clerk's legal advice by allowing a vote on each of the amendments from the Government and the Official Opposition (normally, when opposition day motions are considered, only an amendment from the Government is selected). The Speaker's selection of amendments was viewed as partisan towards Labour. The Government withdrew their amendment at the last moment, ensuring that a vote would not take place in the division lobby, instead Labour's non-binding amendment was nodded through by default, without a vote. Hoyle later offered his regret and gave his apologies to the House and stated his intention to meet party leaders and whips, "to discuss the way forward".

The Daily Telegraph was critical of Hoyle's actions saying, "Lindsay stands accused of being partisan towards his former party — Labour" adding that Hoyle had previously "made it clear he wants to stay as Speaker after the election," the implication being that Labour would withdraw support for his re-election if their preferred amendment of a humanitarian ceasefire was denied. The Speaker was forced to deny in the Chamber that he had had a meeting with Labour advisor Sue Gray but admitted to meeting Keir Starmer, prior to his controversial amendment decision. Starmer said he "simply urged" the Speaker to ensure there was the "broadest possible debate" over calls for a ceasefire in Gaza.

The day after the debate, the Speaker attempted to placate Flynn, by renewing his apologies and offering the SNP an emergency debate under Standing Order 24. Flynn responded that he and his party had "no confidence" in the Speaker and he subsequently added his signature to Wragg's EDM.

The SNP tabled a new motion, for an emergency debate on an immediate ceasefire in Gaza and Israel, calling on the UK Government to take "concrete steps" to push for a ceasefire. Hoyle rejected the new motion on 26 February and Flynn renewed his call for Hoyle to immediately step down. Flynn told the PA news agency: "Last week the Speaker of the House of Commons broke the rules, this week he has broken his word." A "furious" Flynn said, "If 30,000 dead Palestinians aren't worthy of an emergency debate – what is?" On 27 February, three Plaid Cymru MPs added their support to the "No confidence motion" followed in March by Independent MP Crispin Blunt. On 13 March 2024, Lee Anderson withdrew his signature from the early day motion of no confidence in Hoyle.

==== Peter Mandelson arrest ====
On 25 February 2026, Hoyle confirmed to the House of Commons that he had handed 'relevant information' regarding former Labour minister Lord Mandelson to the Metropolitan Police. The Times reported that Hoyle had told police that Mandelson was a 'flight risk' after a visit to the British Virgin Islands to commemorate 75 years of their territorial assembly and that this was the reason for Mandelson's arrest for misconduct in public office earlier that week.

== Personal life ==
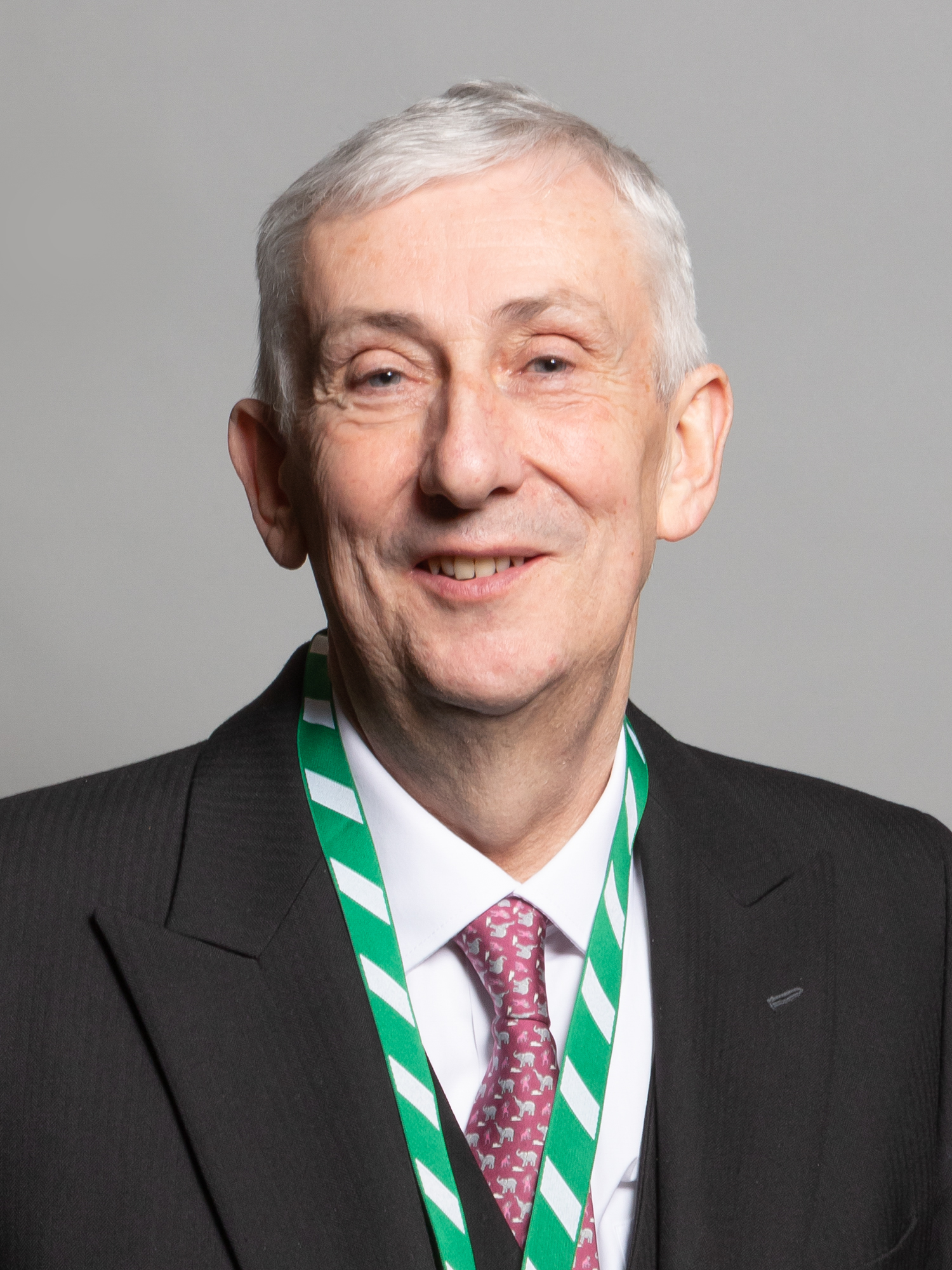
Official portrait, 2020

Hoyle lives in Adlington, Lancashire. As Speaker of the House of Commons he has an official residence at Speaker's House, at the northeast corner of the Palace of Westminster, which is used for official functions and meetings and which has private accommodation in a four-bedroom apartment upstairs.

Hoyle has been married twice and has had two daughters. He was married from 1974 to Lynda Anne Fowler; they divorced in 1982. In June 1993, Hoyle married Catherine Swindley, who succeeded him as the Labour Councillor for Adlington in May 1998. He has also employed his wife as his part-time constituency secretary. Hoyle's elder daughter, Emma Fox, used to work at his constituency office, in which capacity she represented him at Chorley Borough Council.

Hoyle and Conservative Maldon District Councillor Miriam Lewis also had a daughter, Natalie Lewis-Hoyle, a Conservative parish councillor who was found hanged in her bedroom, in December 2017, at the age of 28. Hoyle said he was "truly devastated" by her death. An inquest subsequently returned an open conclusion verdict as to the cause of her death. Shortly before the 2019 general election, he revealed that he had been diagnosed with type 1 diabetes.

Away from politics, he is a supporter of his local football league team, Bolton Wanderers, and rugby league team Warrington Wolves. He served as president of the Rugby Football League between 2022 and 2024.

Hoyle has described himself as an animal lover and has a number of pets, which he has named after notable figures in British political history. Amongst them are his parrot Boris (after former Conservative Prime Minister Boris Johnson), his tortoise Maggie (after Margaret Thatcher) and Attlee (Clement Attlee), his brown tabby Maine Coon cat who spends time in the House of Commons. In July 2024, he announced the addition of another cat called Clem, a black cat with Bengal markings, and suggested, "I think we should have cats across the House that look after the rodent population". He also operates an Instagram page for Attlee, where he regularly shares pictures of the cat in the House of Commons. On 15 February 2024 Hoyle presented a Guinness World Record certificate to the 192-year-old giant tortoise Jonathan, the world's oldest living land animal, during a visit to the island of St Helena.

From his father's ennoblement in 1997 he was entitled to the style of The Honourable. He gained the style of The Right Honourable when sworn into the Privy Council on 12 February 2013. Hoyle was appointed as the Chancellor of the University of Gibraltar in 2020. In October 2026, he was announced as the next chancellor of the University of Wolverhampton.

Hoyle's father Doug Hoyle died in April 2024 at the age of 98.

In January 2025 Hoyle made a guest appearance, in a cameo role as a Lancastrian rambler, in the ITV soap opera Emmerdale, to celebrate its 10,000th episode.

Coat of arms of Lindsay Hoyle
Notes Granted in 2023 Crest Upon a Helm Issuant from a Palisado Crown Or a demi heraldic Antelope Argent attired tufted and unguled Or gorged with a Collar pendent therefrom a Key wards downwards and to the dexter and holding between the legs a Rugby Ball Gules Escutcheon Argent on a Fess conjoined to a Bordure Vert and between three Roses Gules barbed proper each charged with a Bee volant Or striped Sable winged Argent the House of Commons Mace fesswise Or Motto Cernimur In Agendo (We Are Seen In Action) Symbolism The antelope represents his home village of Adlington in Lancashire. The key to Gibraltar that the antelope is wearing references his place as chancellor of the University of Gibraltar. The rugby ball represents his role as president of the Rugby Football League and his love for the sport. The Adlington bees on three Lancashire roses nod to both his home county and village. The mace and the green background represent the House of Commons and Sir Lindsay's role as Speaker of the House.

== Notes ==
Parliament of the United Kingdom
Preceded by Den Dover	Member of Parliament for Chorley; 1997–present	Incumbent
Preceded by Alan Haselhurst	Chairman of Ways and Means; 2010–2019	Succeeded by Eleanor Laing
Preceded by John Bercow	Speaker of the House of Commons; 2019–present	Incumbent
Academic offices
Preceded by The Lord Luce	Chancellor of the University of Gibraltar; 2020–present	Incumbent
Order of precedence in England and Wales
Preceded by Sir Alan Campbell as Lord President of the Council	Gentlemen as Speaker of the House of Commons	Succeeded by The Lord Forsyth of Drumlean as Lord Speaker
Order of precedence in Northern Ireland
Preceded by Andy Burnham as Prime Minister	Gentlemen as Speaker of the House of Commons	Succeeded by The Lord Forsyth of Drumlean as Lord Speaker
