= 2019 Speaker of the British House of Commons election =

2019 election for the Speaker of the House of Commons
- 4 November 2019
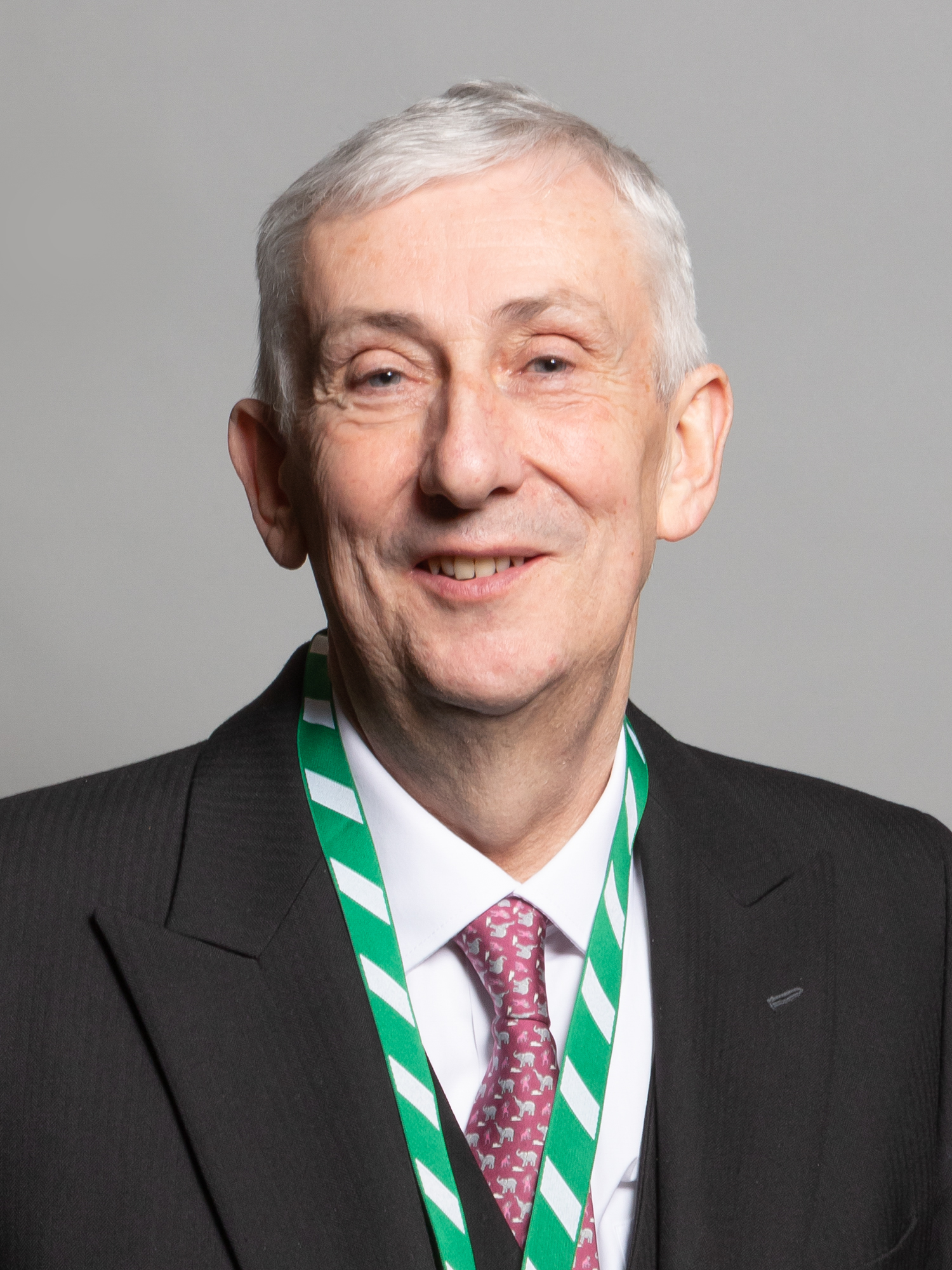

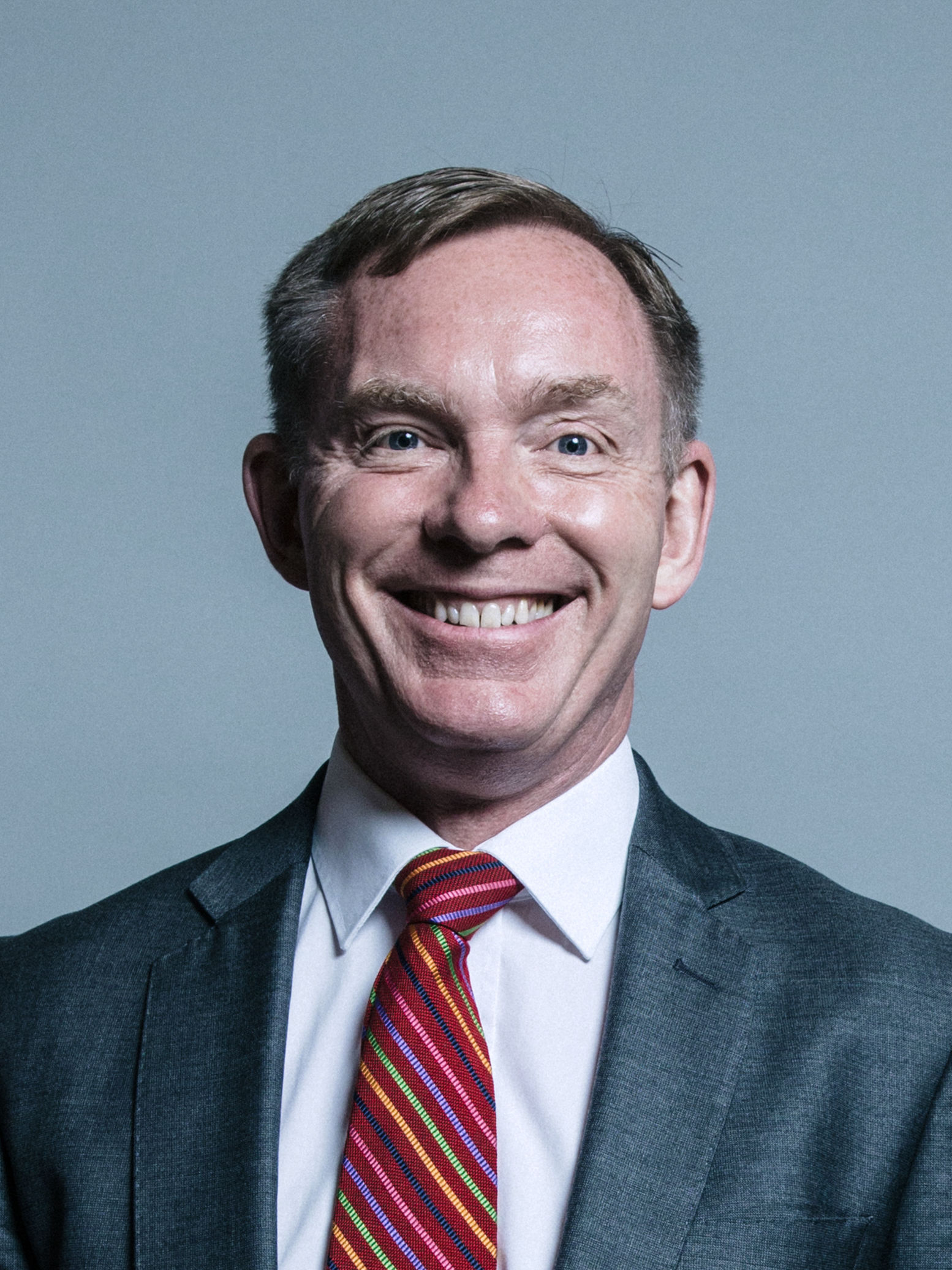

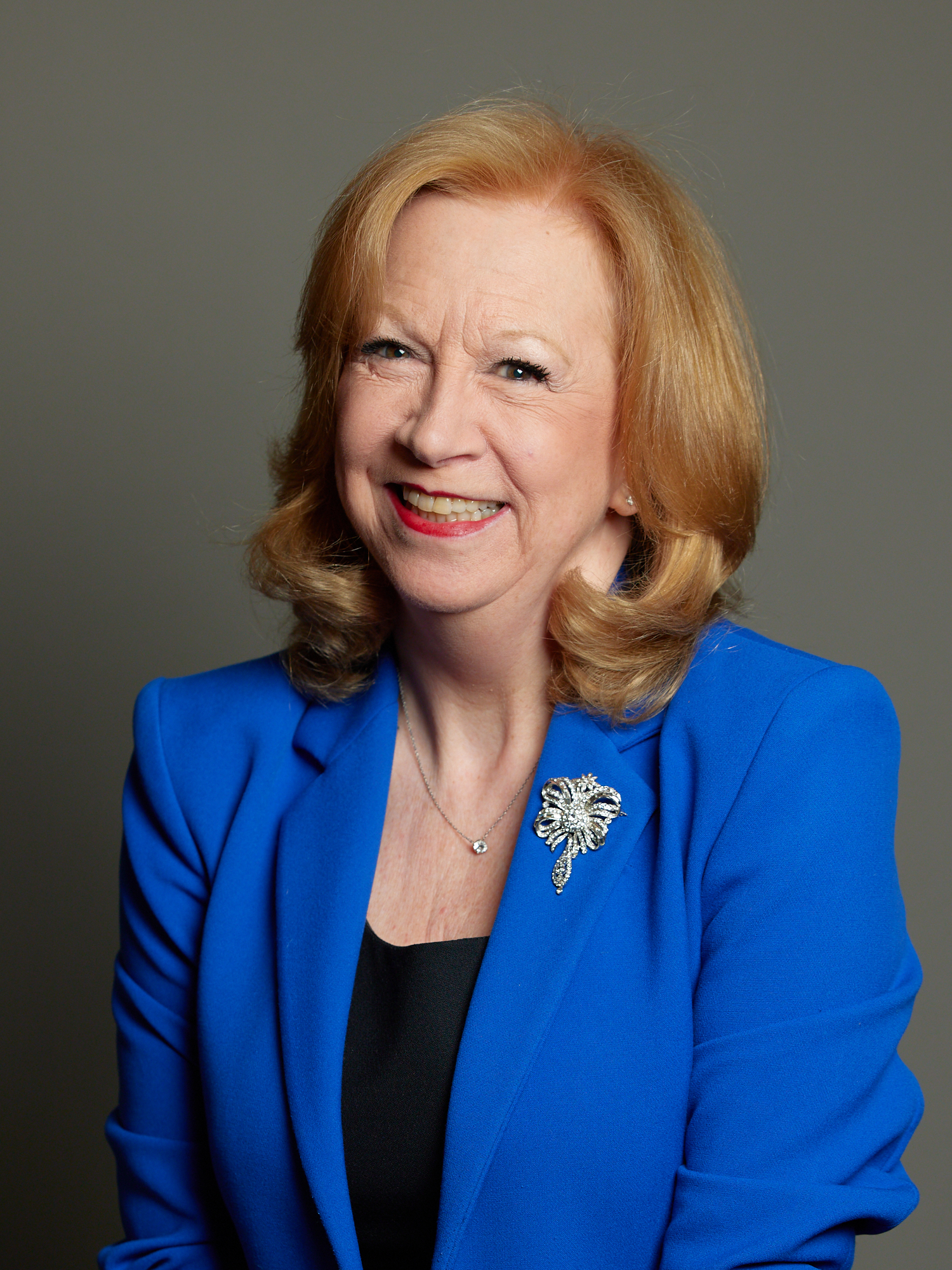
	Majority party	Minority party	Third party
Candidate	Lindsay Hoyle	Chris Bryant	Eleanor Laing
Party	Labour	Labour	Conservative
Constituency	Chorley	Rhondda	Epping Forest
Third round	267 (47.3%)	169 (29.9%)	127 (22.5%)
Final round	325 (60.2%)	213 (39.4%)	Eliminated
Speaker before election
John Bercow
Conservative
Elected Speaker
Lindsay Hoyle
Labour

The election for the 158th Speaker of the House of Commons took place on 4 November 2019. Lindsay Hoyle was elected with 325 votes in the final ballot, out of a total of 540 votes cast.

The election was triggered on 9 September 2019, when former Speaker of the House of Commons, John Bercow, announced his resignation as both Speaker and Member of Parliament, effective at the end of the 31 October 2019 sitting, unless Parliament was dissolved for an early general election before that date, in which case the election of Speaker would take place at the first sitting of the new Parliament. On 29 October the House of Commons voted for an early general election to be held on 12 December 2019 with Parliament due to be dissolved on 6 November, two days after the election of a new Speaker.

== John Bercow ==
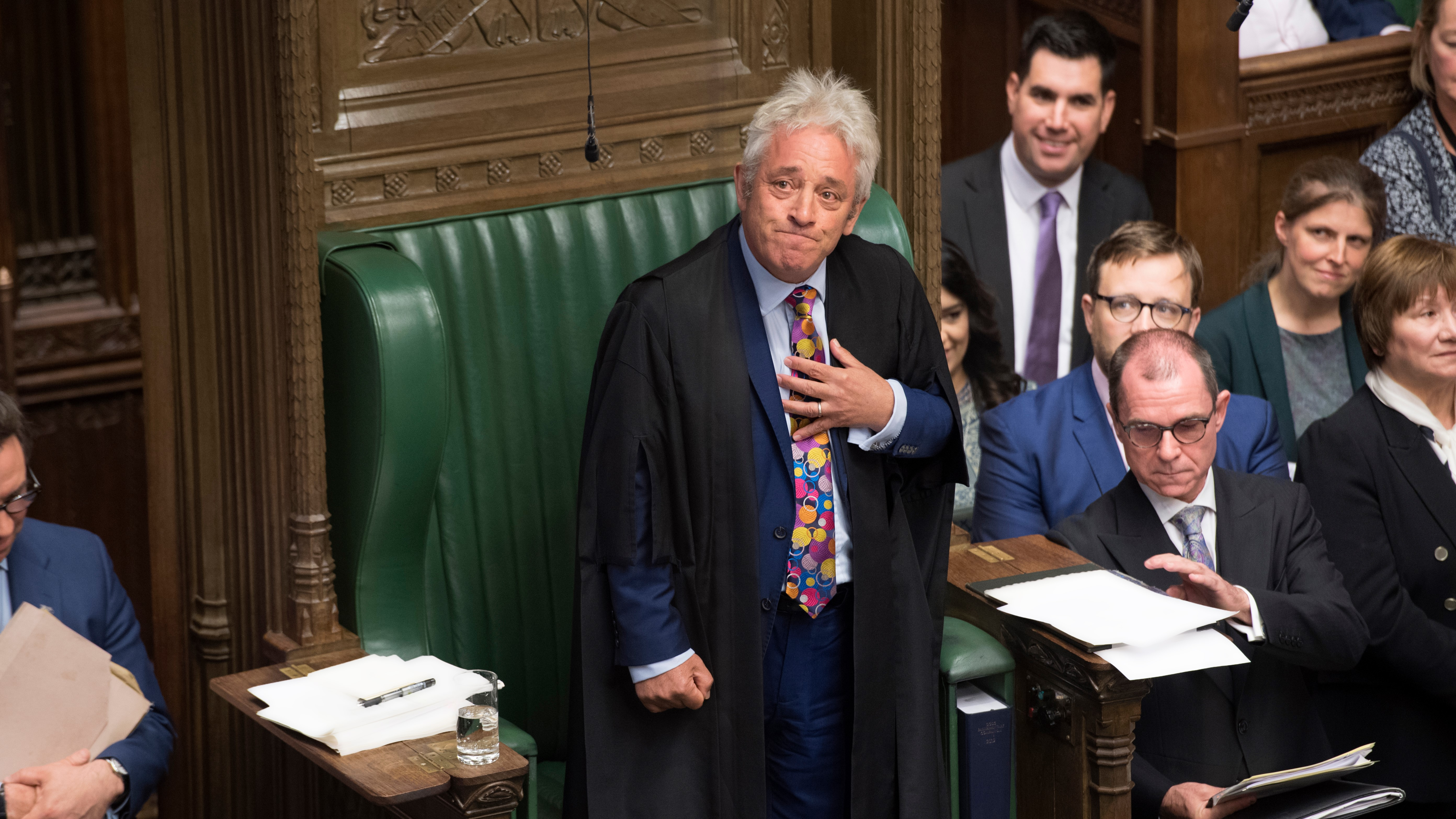
Speaker Bercow announcing his retirement, 9 September

John Bercow, the Member of Parliament for the constituency of Buckingham, was elected to the post of Speaker in 2009. The 2009 election was triggered by the resignation of Michael Martin at the height of the parliamentary expenses scandal. Martin was perceived as being part of a cover-up of inappropriate Parliamentary expenses and faced an unprecedented motion of no confidence in his speakership after he made comments from the chair that attacked a Daily Telegraph leak of parliamentarians' expenses claims. Bercow beat nine other candidates to become Speaker; he defeated fellow Conservative MP George Young in the third and final round by a margin of 322–271.

As Speaker, Bercow garnered a reputation of being a moderniser of the office—he notably eschewed the use of embroidered court dress in favour of business suits—and having a friendly relationship with backbenchers, allowing more urgent questions and backbench business than his predecessors. His backbencher-friendly reputation often put him at odds with the Government: in March 2015, a Government attempt to bring in an election by secret ballot after the general election two months later was defeated by opposition and backbench MPs who saw the effort as an attempt by the Government to depose a Speaker they disliked.

Bercow was elected without contest after the 2010, 2015, and 2017 general elections. In October 2018, it was reported that Bercow had informed friends of his intention to step down as Speaker in mid-2019, after ten years in the role. At the time, Bercow was facing several allegations of bullying his parliamentary staff. In May 2019, he delayed his impending resignation; he stated that he did not feel it was “sensible to vacate the chair” whilst events such as Brexit were debated heavily in Parliament.

Bercow's relationship with the Government had deteriorated over 2019; in March, he allowed backbenchers to attempt to take control of the Order Paper and pass the European Union (Withdrawal) Act 2019, which forced Brexit to be delayed from March to October 2019. After backbenchers took control of the Order Paper again to pass the European Union (Withdrawal) (No. 2) Act 2019, former Leader of the House of Commons, Andrea Leadsom, wrote an opinion column in the 8 September edition of the Mail on Sunday which accused the Speaker of "flagrant abuse" of parliamentary process and welcomed the Buckingham Conservative Association's intent to break with tradition and stand a candidate against him at the next general election.

On 9 September 2019, hours before the prorogation of Parliament, Bercow made a statement from the chair announcing his impending resignation: if Parliament voted for a general election that night, he would stand down at the election; if Parliament rejected an early election, he would stand down at the close of business on 31 October. Bercow said his choice of date — also the day when the United Kingdom was due to leave the European Union — was to ensure minimal disruption to the debates on the Queen's Speech in mid-October. His resignation came at a time of major legislative conflict between Parliament and the Government; a speakership election before a general election made it more difficult for the Government—which did not have a working majority in Parliament—to install a friendlier Speaker. Bercow resigned as an MP on 4 November.

== Procedure ==
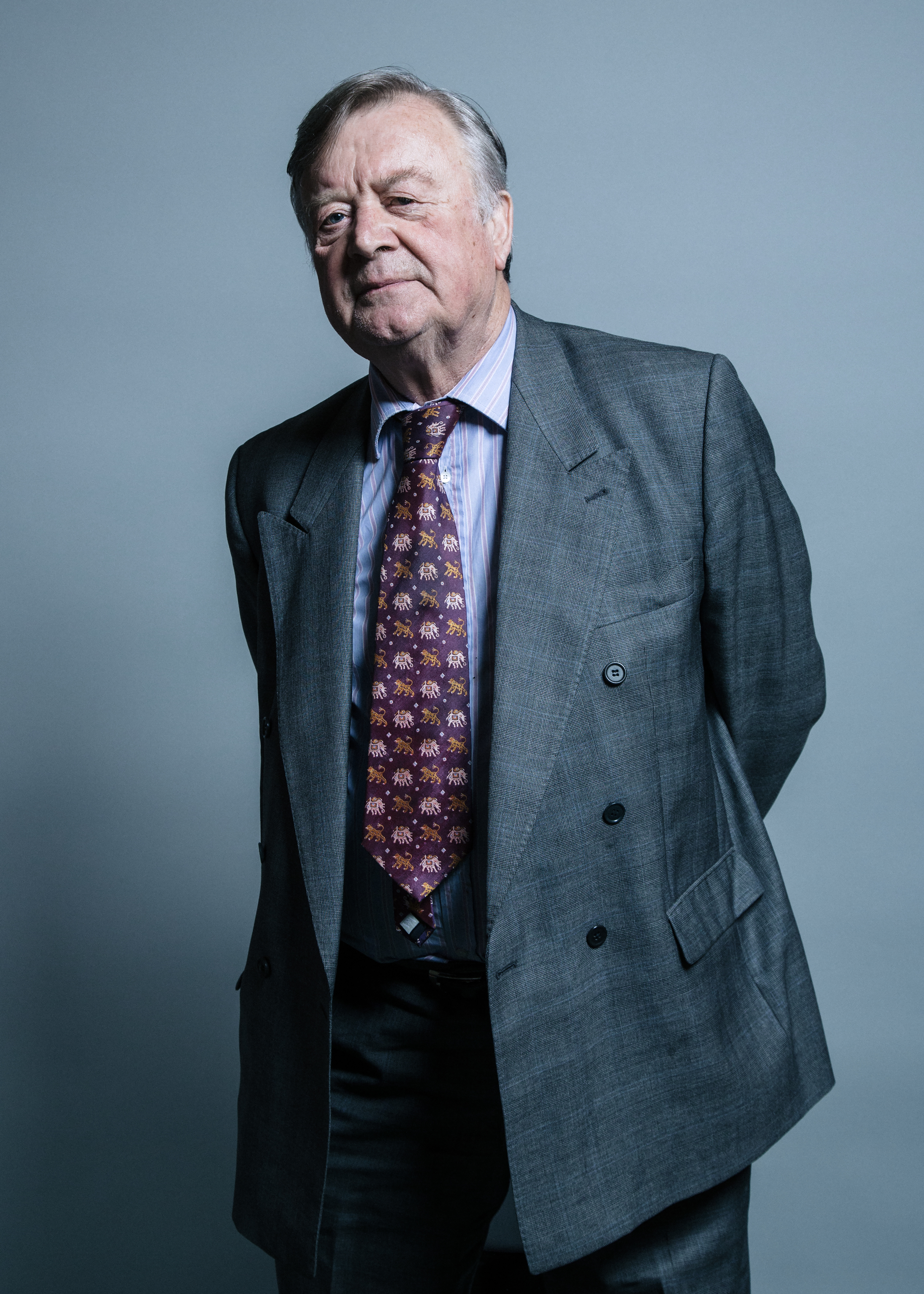
Kenneth Clarke, Father of the House, presided over the election.

The rules for the election of the Speaker were introduced in 2001, after what was perceived as a farcical, time-consuming procedure of individual substantive motions in the 2000 election. They are set out in Section 1 of the Standing Orders of the House of Commons. All candidates for Speaker were required to be a sitting Member of Parliament and be nominated by at least twelve and at most fifteen Members of Parliament, at least three of whom must be from a political party different from that of the candidate. Each MP could only nominate one candidate. On the morning of the election, the nominations were transmitted to the Clerk of the House alongside the candidate's statement of consent to nomination. The House then met at 2:30 pm and was presided over by Father of the House Kenneth Clarke (Independent, Rushcliffe), during the election. If there had been only one candidate, a motion would have been laid before the House to ask if the candidate should take the Chair as Speaker. If the question was challenged, the decision would have been put to a division.

There were seven candidates for election and each candidate gave a five-minute speech to the House before the start of voting. The House then voted by secret ballot, using the exhaustive ballot voting system. Each MP cast one vote and an absolute majority was required. If no candidate won a majority, the individual with the fewest votes was eliminated, as were any candidates who received less than 5% of the votes cast. The House then continued to vote until one member received a majority of the vote. After four rounds of voting, Sir Lindsay Hoyle received an absolute majority. At that point, the Father of the House Kenneth Clarke put the question "That Sir Lindsay Hoyle do take the Chair of this House as Speaker"; which was passed without audible opposition. Hoyle was then, by tradition, dragged to the Chair by his fellow MPs.

Hoyle formally became Speaker upon receiving the Queen's approbation shortly after his election. The approval was given on behalf of Queen Elizabeth II by a royal commission consisting of Robert James Buckland, Lord Chancellor; Baroness Evans of Bowes Park, Leader of the House of Lords; Lord Dholakia, Deputy Leader of the Liberal Democrats in the House of Lords; Lord Judge, Convenor of the Crossbench Peers; and Baroness Smith of Basildon, Leader of the Opposition in the House of Lords.

== Candidates ==
Following reports that John Bercow planned to step down in 2019, a number of potential candidates attracted speculation in the media. Candidates and their intentions are given below:

=== Announced ===
- Chris Bryant (Labour, Rhondda)
- Harriet Harman (Labour, Camberwell and Peckham)
- Meg Hillier (Labour, Hackney South and Shoreditch)
- Lindsay Hoyle (Labour, Chorley; Deputy Speaker and Chairman of Ways and Means)
- Eleanor Laing (Conservative, Epping Forest; Deputy Speaker)
- Edward Leigh (Conservative, Gainsborough)
- Rosie Winterton (Labour, Doncaster Central; Deputy Speaker)

=== Declined ===
- Pete Wishart (SNP, Perth and North Perthshire); previously expressed an interest in running, but decided against a candidacy after Bercow's resignation in order to spend more time campaigning for Scottish independence.

=== Withdrew prior to nomination ===
- Sir Henry Bellingham (Conservative, North West Norfolk)
- Shailesh Vara (Conservative, North West Cambridgeshire); endorsed Hoyle.

=== Nominations ===
The official list of candidates, along with the MPs who nominated them, was released on the morning of 4 November. Nominations were as follows:

- Chris Bryant – Diana Johnson, Chris Heaton-Harris, Philippa Whitford, Michael Gove, John McDonnell, Shabana Mahmood, Caroline Lucas, Luciana Berger, Greg Clark, Holly Lynch, Lyn Brown, Bim Afolami, Ian Murray, Tom Tugendhat, Melanie Onn.
- Harriet Harman – Andrew Mitchell, Karen Buck, Joanna Cherry, Barbara Keeley, Daniel Zeichner, Kate Green, Janet Daby, Seema Malhotra, Emily Thornberry, Daniel Kawczynski, Rachel Reeves, Nicky Morgan, David Lammy, Christine Jardine, Sarah Wollaston.
- Meg Hillier – Layla Moran, Emma Hardy, Sarah Champion, Nia Griffith, Mark Prisk, Lee Rowley, Douglas Chapman, Anne Marie Morris, Simon Hoare, Ian Mearns, Lisa Cameron, Gareth Thomas, Deidre Brock.
- Lindsay Hoyle – Sir Charles Walker, Marion Fellows, Tracey Crouch, Marsha de Cordova, David Crausby, Joan Ryan, Seema Kennedy, Pauline Latham, Kevan Jones, Sir Roger Gale, William Wragg, Christian Matheson, Khalid Mahmood, Caroline Flint, Jamie Stone.
- Eleanor Laing – Maria Miller, Stewart McDonald, Stephanie Peacock, Geoffrey Clifton-Brown, Ross Thomson, Andrea Jenkyns, Penny Mordaunt, David Linden, Chris Grayling, Tim Loughton, Jack Brereton, Liam Fox, Mark Harper, Rosie Winterton, Anne-Marie Trevelyan.
- Edward Leigh – Richard Bacon, Julian Lewis, Nigel Mills, Martin Vickers, Sir John Hayes, Barry Sheerman, Martin Docherty-Hughes, Alberto Costa, Stephen Pound, Sir David Amess, Robert Goodwill, Fiona Bruce, David Morris, Mike Kane, Geraint Davies.
- Rosie Winterton – Mary Creagh, Jonathan Ashworth, Peter Kyle, Sir Patrick McLoughlin, Alistair Carmichael, Eleanor Smith, Kevin Barron, Liz McInnes, Mims Davies, Dame Eleanor Laing, Tommy Sheppard, John Grogan, Ed Miliband, Ian Lucas, Tom Brake.

Notably, Eleanor Laing and Rosie Winterton nominated each other.

== Opinion polling ==
Pollster/client(s)	Date(s) conducted	Sample size	Chris Bryant	Henry Bellingham	Harriet Harman	Meg Hillier	Lindsay Hoyle	Eleanor Laing	Edward Leigh	Shailesh Vara	Rosie Winterton	Other	Don't Know	Lead
YouGov	9–29 Oct 2019	101 MPs	13%	0%	7%	0%	50%	14%	0%	0%	3%	3%	10%	36% lead for Hoyle
YouGov	16–28 Jan 2019	100 MPs	1%	—N/a	5%	—N/a	35%	6%	—N/a	—N/a	—N/a	5% Others Peter Bone 2% 'Keep John Bercow' 2% Graham Brady 1% Chris Williamson 1% Vernon Coaker 1%	41%	29% lead for Hoyle

== Results ==
The results of the first secret ballot were announced at 16:15 GMT on 4 November 2019. The results of the second ballot were announced at 17:45, with the results of the third ballot coming at 19:15. Lindsay Hoyle was announced as the winner at 20:20.

Candidate	First ballot		Second ballot		Third ballot		Fourth ballot	
Candidate	Votes	%	Votes	%	Votes	%	Votes	%
Lindsay Hoyle ✓	211	37.5	244	42.4	267	47.3	325	60.2
Chris Bryant	98	17.4	120	20.9	169	29.9	213	39.4
Eleanor Laing	113	20.1	122	21.2	127	22.5	Eliminated	
Harriet Harman	72	12.8	59	10.3	Withdrew			
Rosie Winterton	46	8.2	30	5.2	Eliminated			
Edward Leigh	12	2.1	Eliminated					
Meg Hillier	10	1.8	Eliminated					
Spoilt/rejected ballots	0	0.0	0	0.0	2	0.4	2	0.4
Turnout (Note: At the time of the election, the full house had 650 seats. Two of these were vacant, seven Sinn Féin MPs do not take their seats, and one MP was suspended. Turnout is thus based on 640 possible voters.)	562	87.8	575	89.8	565	88.3	540	84.4

Following the final vote, the question was put "That Sir Lindsay Hoyle do take the Chair of this House as Speaker", which was carried without any audible opposition. After this, Hoyle was dragged to the Chair (as per House custom) by Nigel Evans and Caroline Flint, and gave an inaugural speech as Speaker elect. Hoyle received royal approbation later in the evening from the royal commissioners and, at that time, officially became Speaker.

Hoyle was re-elected, unopposed, to the position on 17 December 2019 following the general election of 12 December.
