= Chris Bryant =

British politician (born 1962)

The Right Honourable Sir Chris Bryant MP
- Official portrait, 2026

Secretary of State for Northern Ireland
- Incumbent
- Assumed office 20 July 2026
- Prime Minister: Andy Burnham
- Preceded by: Hilary Benn
Junior ministerial offices
Minister of State for Trade
In office 6 September 2025 – 20 July 2026
Prime Minister	Keir Starmer
Preceded by	Douglas Alexander
Succeeded by	Anas Sarwar
Minister of State for Data Protection and Telecoms
In office 8 July 2024 – 6 September 2025
Prime Minister	Keir Starmer
Preceded by	Julia Lopez
Succeeded by	Ian Murray
Minister of State for Creative Industries, Arts and Tourism
In office 8 July 2024 – 6 September 2025
Prime Minister	Keir Starmer
Preceded by	Julia Lopez (Creative Industries and Tourism); The Lord Parkinson of Whitley Bay (Arts)
Succeeded by	Ian Murray
Parliamentary Under-Secretary of State for Europe and Asia
In office 13 October 2009 – 11 May 2010
Prime Minister	Gordon Brown
Preceded by	Glenys Kinnock
Succeeded by	David Lidington
Parliamentary Under-Secretary of State for Foreign and Commonwealth Affairs
In office 9 June 2009 – 11 May 2010
Prime Minister	Gordon Brown
Preceded by	Gillian Merron
Succeeded by	Henry Bellingham
Deputy Leader of the House of Commons
In office 5 October 2008 – 9 June 2009
Prime Minister	Gordon Brown
Preceded by	Helen Goodman
Succeeded by	Barbara Keeley

Member of Parliament for Rhondda and Ogmore Rhondda (2001–2024)
- Incumbent
- Assumed office 7 June 2001
- Preceded by: Allan Rogers
- Majority: 7,790 (21.8%)
Committee chairmanships
2020–2023	Standards
2020–2022	Privileges
2017–2019	Finance
Shadow portfolios
Shadow cabinet
2015–2016	Commons Leader
2015–2015	Culture, Media and Sport
Shadow Frontbench
2023–2024	Creative Industries and Digital
2014–2015	Arts
2013–2014	Welfare Reform
2011–2013	Immigration
2010–2011	Political and Constitutional Reform
2010	Europe

Personal details
- Born: Christopher John Bryant; 11 January 1962 (age 64) Cardiff, Wales
- Party: Labour (1986–present)
- Other political affiliations: Conservative (before 1986)
- Spouse: Jared Cranney (m. 2013)
- Education: Mansfield College, Oxford (BA); Ripon College Cuddesdon
- Website: www.chrisbryant.org.uk

Sir Chris John Bryant (born 11 January 1962) is a Welsh politician and former Anglican priest who has served as Secretary of State for Northern Ireland since 2026. A member of the Labour Party, he has been the Member of Parliament (MP) for Rhondda and Ogmore, and previously Rhondda, since 2001.

Born in Cardiff, Bryant was privately educated at Cheltenham College before studying English at Mansfield College, Oxford. After graduating with a further degree in theology, he served as a Church of England priest until 1991. He worked for Common Purpose from 1994 to 1996 and at the BBC from 1998 to 2001. Bryant was elected to Hackney Borough Council in 1993, representing Leabridge ward and serving until 1998. After his unsuccessful candidacy at the 1997 general election for the Wycombe constituency, Bryant was elected for the Labour safe seat of Rhondda at the 2001 general election. He was reelected at the 2005 general election and called for the resignation of Prime Minister Tony Blair in 2006. Bryant became the Parliamentary private secretary (PPS) to Charlie Falconer and later Harriet Harman, before joining the government frontbench as Deputy Leader of the House of Commons in 2008 under Gordon Brown. He later served as Under-Secretary of State for Europe and Asia from 2009 to 2010.

Following Labour's defeat at the 2010 general election, Bryant became the shadow europe minister. He unsuccessfully stood for the shadow cabinet in the 2010 election, and subsequently became a shadow home and justice minister under Ed Miliband. He held various junior shadow portfolios between 2010 and 2015. Following Labour's defeat at 2015 general election, Bryant was promoted to the Shadow Cabinet as Shadow Culture Secretary. He became Shadow Leader of the House of Commons in 2015 under Jeremy Corbyn, before resigning in protest at Corbyn's leadership in 2016. On the backbenches, he served as the chair of several select committees, and stood in the 2019 Speaker of the House of Commons election but was defeated by Lindsay Hoyle. He returned to the frontbench as a shadow culture minister under Keir Starmer in 2023.

Following Labour's victory in the 2024 general election, Bryant returned to government as Minister of State for Creative Industries, Arts and Tourism and Minister of State for Data Protection and Telecoms under Starmer. In the 2025 government reshuffle, he was appointed Minister of State for Trade. After Andy Burnham became Prime Minister in July 2026, Bryant was promoted to cabinet as Secretary of State for Northern Ireland.

== Early life and career ==
Chris John Bryant was born on 11 January 1962 in Cardiff, to a Scottish mother and a Welsh father. He grew up in Cardiff, where his father worked for five years, in Spain for five years in the 1960s, which led him to speaking fluent Spanish, and in Cheltenham, Gloucestershire. He was educated at Cheltenham College, an independent school for boys.

He studied English at Mansfield College, Oxford, and graduated with a Bachelor of Arts (BA) degree in 1986. He was initially a member of the Conservative Party and an elected office-holder in the Oxford University Conservative Association. He joined the Labour Party in 1986.

From 1983 to 1986, after completing his first degree, Bryant trained for ordained ministry at Ripon College Cuddesdon in Oxfordshire. During this time, he also studied theology at Oxford. He was ordained in the Church of England as a deacon in 1986 by Richard Harries and as a priest in 1987. The first service he led after his ordination was the funeral of Michael Croft, the founder of the National Youth Theatre. Bryant later alleged that he had been sexually abused by Croft when he attended the drama group in London at the age of 16.

He served his curacy at the Church of All Saints, High Wycombe, from 1986 to 1989. He was then a youth chaplain in Peterborough, and travelled in Latin America. In 1991, Bryant left the ordained ministry after deciding that being gay was incompatible with being a priest. Statements made by Bishop of Oxford Richard Harries also influenced his decision.

== Early political career (1992–2001) ==
After leaving the priesthood in 1991, Bryant made a career move and began work as the election agent to the Holborn and St Pancras Constituency Labour Party, where he helped Frank Dobson hold his seat in the 1992 general election. From 1993, he was Local Government Officer for the Labour Party; he lived in Hackney and was elected to Hackney Borough Council in 1993, representing Leabridge ward and serving until 1998. He became Chairman of the Christian Socialist Movement. From 1994 to 1996, he was London manager of the charity Common Purpose.

In 1996, Bryant became a full-time author, writing biographies of Stafford Cripps and Glenda Jackson. At the 1997 general election, Bryant was the Labour candidate for Wycombe, winning 35.4% of the vote and coming second behind the incumbent Conservative MP Ray Whitney.

From 1998 until his election to Parliament in 2001, Bryant was the Head of European Affairs for the BBC.

== Parliamentary career ==
=== Early career (2001–2007) ===
Bryant's selection for the very safe Labour seat of Rhondda in South Wales in 2000 surprised many people given his background – gay, a former Anglican cleric, and someone who had been a Conservative as a student. He says of his surprise selection, "I fell off the chair, and my opponents certainly did". Fifty-two people applied for the candidature and a local councillor was the favourite to win. Bryant was elected as MP for Rhondda at the 2001 general election with a majority of 16,047 and 68.3% of the vote.

From 2004 until 2007, Bryant was chairman of the Labour Movement for Europe.

At the 2005 general election, Bryant was re-elected with a decreased vote share of 68.1% but an increased majority of 16,242.

On 5 September 2006, with Siôn Simon, he coordinated a prominent letter which was signed by 15 Labour backbenchers calling for Tony Blair's immediate resignation.

==== Phone hacking scandal ====
On 11 March 2003, as part of an inquiry into Privacy and Press Intrusion by the Commons Select Committee on Culture, Media and Sport, he asked Rebekah Wade (now Brooks) whether she had ever paid police officers for information. Seated beside Andy Coulson, the editor of the News of the World, she said 'yes'. Bryant had his phone hacked later that year by the News of the World, a fact which became known to the Metropolitan Police when they seized material from the private investigator Glenn Mulcaire. Bryant, along with John Prescott and Brian Paddick, sought judicial review of the Metropolitan Police in an attempt to force them to contact all the victims of phone hacking by the News of the World. The Metropolitan Police accepted their liability and he won damages of £30,000 from News International in 2012.

Bryant called for and led the parliamentary debates on referring the phone hacking scandal to the Standards and Privileges Committee on 9 September 2010, and the Emergency Debate on whether there should be a judge led enquiry on 6 July 2011 which led to the setting up of the Leveson Inquiry.

=== Brown government (2007–2010) ===
Bryant was the Parliamentary private secretary to the Secretary of State for Constitutional Affairs Charlie Falconer. In Gordon Brown's autumn 2008 reshuffle, Bryant was promoted from his role as Parliamentary Private Secretary to Harriet Harman to the ministerial position of Deputy Leader of the House of Commons otherwise known as Parliamentary Secretary to the House of Commons. This was followed by another move in the June 2009 reshuffle, when he moved to the Foreign and Commonwealth Office as the Parliamentary Under-Secretary of State for Foreign Affairs. On 13 October 2009, he was also appointed Minister for Europe.

==== Expenses scandal ====
Bryant claimed over £92,000 in expenses over the five years leading up to the 2009 scandal over MPs' expenses. During that time he flipped his second home twice. He claimed mortgage interest expenses that started at £7,800 per year before rising (after flipping) to £12,000 per year. He also claimed £6,400 in stamp duty and other fees on his most recent purchase, and £6,000 per year in service charges.

=== In opposition ===
==== Miliband shadow frontbench (2010–2015) ====
At the 2010 general election, Bryant was again re-elected, with a decreased vote share of 55.3% and a decreased majority of 11,553.

In October 2010, Bryant stood as one of 49 candidates for election to the 19 places in the Shadow Cabinet in the internal Labour Party poll, receiving 77 votes, 29th position on the list.

In October 2010, Bryant described the coalition government's housing benefit reforms as poorer people "being socially engineered and sociologically cleansed out of London". The use of the term "cleansing" was criticised by members of the coalition, including deputy prime minister Nick Clegg, who called Bryant's comment "offensive to people who had witnessed ethnic cleansing in other parts of the world".

In 2011, in the House of Commons, he criticised the then Prince Andrew for a number of alleged indiscretions.

Bryant won the Stonewall Politician of the Year Award in 2011 for his work to support equality for lesbian, gay and bisexual people. He was given a score of 100% in favour of lesbian, gay and bisexual equality by Stonewall. On 5 February 2013, he voted in favour in the House of Commons Second Reading vote on same-sex marriage in Britain.

Following the Russian annexation of Crimea in 2014, Bryant told the Commons 'I am afraid that the international response... has thus far been pitiful and spineless. People have even trotted out in this Chamber the argument that most of the people in Crimea are Russian speaking and wanted to join Russia in the first place. Can Members not hear history running through the decades?... There has been little honour in the way that Britain, France and the United States, having signed up to the Budapest memorandum, which guaranteed the territorial integrity of Ukraine, now make lots of great speeches but introduce the measliest level of sanctions and targeted interventions against Russian individuals... A Russian friend of mine says that Putin is not yet mad. That may be true, but what will our surrendering and our appeasement do for his sanity?'

In December 2014, Bryant was moved from Shadow Minister for Welfare Reform to Shadow Minister for the Arts. In this position, he suggested in January 2015 that too many successful artists such as "James Blunt and their ilk" had been educated at private schools, and that he wanted to see more encouragement for the arts for people from a variety of backgrounds, even though Bryant himself attended a private school. Blunt said that Bryant was a "narrow-minded 'classist gimp' who was motivated by the 'politics of jealousy'"; Bryant responded by claiming that Blunt should not be "so blooming precious" and that he was not "knocking [his] success" but attempting to draw attention to the lack of diversity in the arts.

==== Shadow cabinet (2015–2016) ====
At the 2015 general election, Bryant was again re-elected with a decreased vote share of 50.7% and a decreased majority of 7,455. On 8 May 2015, he was promoted to the shadow cabinet as Shadow Secretary of State for Culture, Media and Sport in the Second Harman shadow cabinet.

In September 2015, following Jeremy Corbyn's election as Labour Party leader, Bryant was appointed Shadow Leader of the House of Commons. He resigned from this position on 26 June 2016, along with other shadow ministers after the Brexit vote.

==== Return to the backbenches (2016–2023) ====
Bryant supported Owen Smith in the failed attempt to replace Jeremy Corbyn in the 2016 Labour leadership election. He supported Remain in the EU referendum in June 2016 and voted against the triggering of Article 50 in February 2017.

In January 2017, as ex-chair of the all-party parliamentary group for Russia, Bryant claimed that the Russian government orchestrated a homophobic campaign to remove him from this position, saying that the Russian government has acquired kompromat on high-profile Conservative Party MPs including Boris Johnson, Liam Fox, Alan Duncan and David Davis.

On 12 January 2017, Bryant bemused his fellow MPs and Speaker of the House John Bercow, when he wished Bercow happy "kiss a ginger day", during business questions.

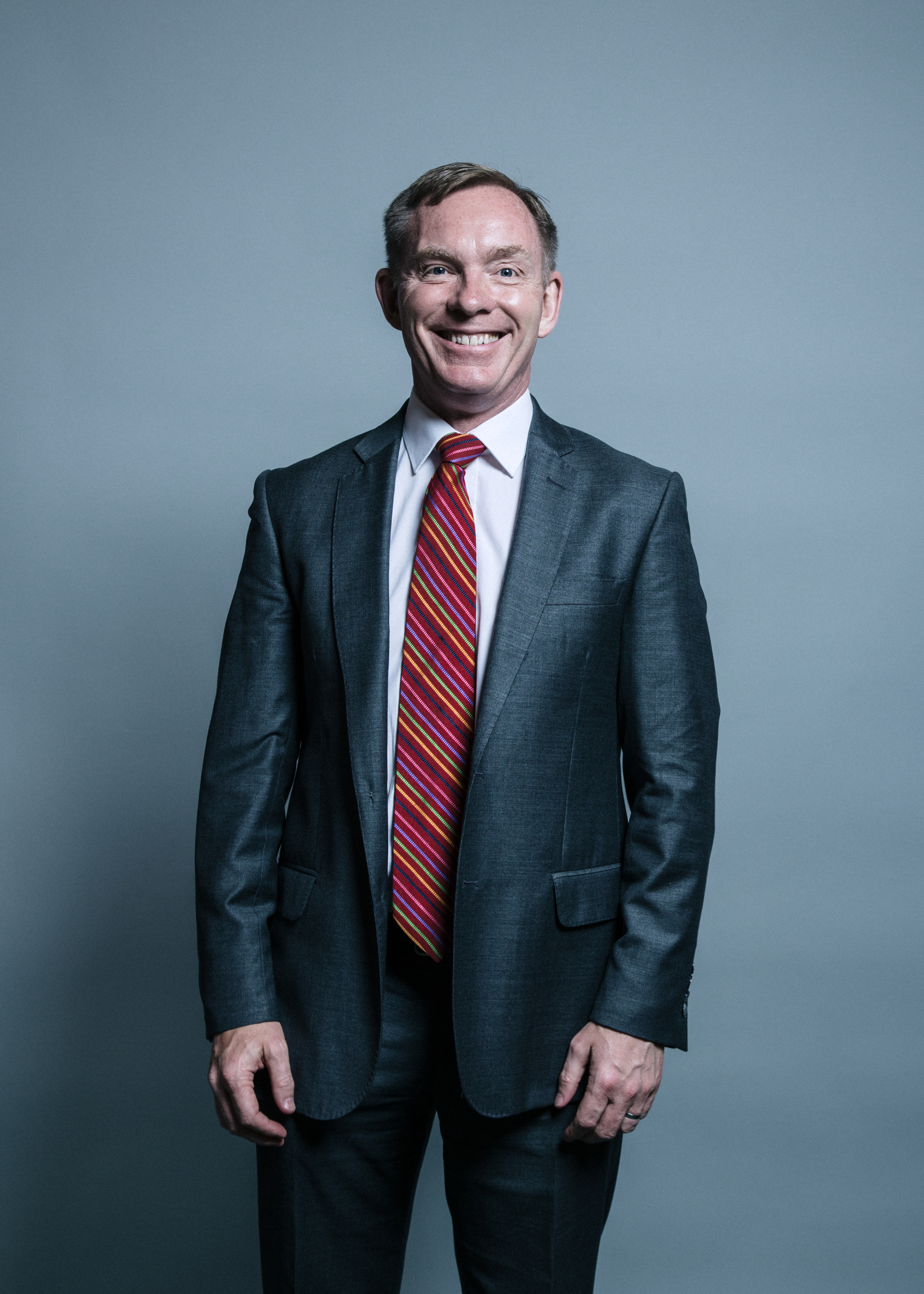
Official portrait, 2017

At the snap 2017 general election, Bryant was again re-elected, with an increased vote share of 64.1% and an increased majority of 13,746.

Following the general election in 2017, Bryant came first in the ballot for Private Members Bills, and after consulting his constituents introduced the Assaults on Emergency Workers (Offences) Bill, which introduced a new offence of assaulting an emergency worker. It received royal assent on 13 November 2018 as the Assaults on Emergency Workers (Offences) Act 2018.

Following John Bercow's resignation as Speaker of the House of Commons on 31 October 2019, Bryant stood in the election for a new speaker on 4 November 2019, losing to Lindsay Hoyle by 213 to 325.

At the 2019 general election, Bryant was again re-elected, with a decreased vote share of 54.4% and a decreased majority of 11,440.

In May 2020, Bryant was elected as the Chair of the Commons Select Committee on Standards and Commons Select Committee of Privileges, . In October 2021, he chaired the Standards Committee's decision on the sanction to be applied to Owen Paterson for breaching lobbying rules relating to paid advocacy which triggered the parliamentary second jobs controversy. In April 2022, due to having already expressed views about the Partygate scandal, Bryant recused himself from the subsequent investigation by the Privileges Committee into whether Boris Johnson had committed contempt of parliament over statements to the House of Commons concerning alleged parties.

In December 2020, Bryant became engaged in a row with the Commons Speaker, Lindsay Hoyle. The disturbance started with Bryant heckling the Prime Minister while standing near to a door. The Speaker informed Bryant that social distancing rules meant he needed to move and he then instructed Bryant to sit in one of the seats intended for use by MPs. Some of those present thought that Bryant then uttered an offensive expletive back to the Speaker although Bryant denied this. Bryant then exited the chamber of the Commons while the Speaker called for him. Some moments after the Speaker had denounced Bryant's "disgraceful behaviour", Bryant returned to the chamber to engage in what appeared to be a heated discussion with the Speaker. Hoyle said: "Mr Bryant, I think we need to have this conversation later" and Bryant left the chamber.

Bryant came tenth in the Private Members Bill ballot in the 2021–2022 Session of Parliament and introduced the Acquired Brain Injury Bill on 10 November 2021, which would require the Government to produce, implement and review a national strategy for acquired brain injury. He withdrew the Bill when the Secretary of State for Health and Social Care, Sajid Javid, announced that Bryant and Gillian Keegan, the minister for Care and Mental Health, would co-chair a cross-government programme board to draw up a national strategy in December 2021. Keegan said: “All Government departments are invited to join the board. The strategy will be kept under review and revised periodically, to ensure it continues to reflect the priority areas and actions needed to support those living with ABI, and their families.”

In December 2021, Bryant told the BBC in an interview that he felt "less physically safe as a gay man than he did 30 years ago." While denying that Boris Johnson himself was homophobic, he accused those around him of being happy to "stir the pot." As evidence, he cited the government's stance on transgender people and their attitude towards conversion therapy.

In March 2022 Bryant incorrectly claimed that Nigel Farage had been paid over £500,000 by the Russian state. In July 2023 he corrected the record.

==== Return to the frontbench (2023–2024) ====
In the 2023 British shadow cabinet reshuffle, he was appointed Shadow Minister for the Creative Industries and Digital.

=== Return to government (2024–2026) ===
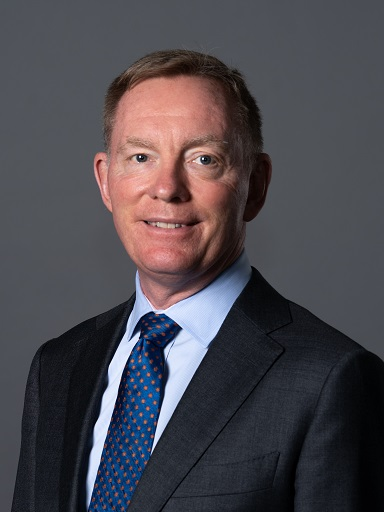
Official portrait, 2024

Bryant was elected MP for the Rhondda and Ogmore constituency which replaced the former Rhondda seat at the 2024 general election. Following the general election, he was appointed Minister of State for Data and Telecoms in the Department for Science, Innovation and Technology and Minister of State for Creative Industries, Arts and Tourism in the Department for Culture, Media and Sport.

In September 2025 he was made Minister for Trade in the Department of Business and Trade.

=== Northern Ireland Secretary (2026–present) ===
On 20 July 2026, Bryant was promoted to cabinet in the new government and appointed Secretary of State for Northern Ireland by Andy Burnham. He replaced Hilary Benn.

== Personal life ==
Bryant entered into a civil partnership with Jared Cranney on 27 March 2010 in the first such ceremony held in the Houses of Parliament. They are now married. Bryant lives in Porth in the Rhondda.

He was ridiculed by the press in 2003 when he posted a picture of himself wearing only underwear on a gay dating site Gaydar. Bryant later reflected on the affair, saying, "It was a wound but it's a rather charming scar now. I had a period when I barely slept and it was horrible, but I'm very lucky in having a supportive set of friends – MP friends and others – and they looked after me." At the time, the media predicted that he would not survive politically, and there was much talk of his possible deselection. In 2013, he said that the incident had boosted his majority as an MP.

On 25 September 2006, The Guardian ran four spoof diary articles called "Chris Bryant's Manchester Diary", followed by a clarification that they were parodies not written by Bryant.

In March 2019, Bryant said that he had undergone surgery for stage three melanoma, a skin cancer. In May 2024, he announced that his cancer had spread to his lung and that he was undergoing immunotherapy for it; he urged people to "please take skin cancer seriously". In July 2025, he tweeted that the cancer appeared to be in remission.

On 1 May 2022, Bryant said that he had been groped and "touched up" by older male MPs early in his career in the House of Commons.

== Political positions ==
Bryant is a member of the Fabian Society. In 2003, Bryant voted for participation in the Iraq war. He is a member of the Labour Friends of Israel and Labour Friends of Palestine and the Middle East group.

Bryant campaigned for the UK Government to introduce Magnitsky Sanctions on those who abuse human rights around the world and co-chairs the All Party Parliamentary Group on Magnitsky Sanctions with Sir Iain Duncan Smith MP and is a Member of the Foreign Affairs Select Committee. He is a Fellow of the Society of Antiquaries of London.

In November 2017, Bryant called for the arrest of the President of the United States, Donald Trump, if he travels to the United Kingdom, after the President shared a comment on the social media website Twitter from a member of the far-right group Britain First that related to radical Islamic events. Bryant stated: "The Prime Minister should make it absolutely clear that if Donald Trump comes to this country he'll be arrested for inciting religious hatred and therefore he'd be better off not coming at all."

== Honours ==
Bryant was knighted in the 2023 New Year Honours for political and public service. On 21 July 2026, Bryant was sworn of the Privy Council, entitling him to the honorific style "The Right Honourable" for life.

== Publications ==
- Possible Dreams: Personal History of the British Christian Socialists by Chris Bryant, 1996, Hodder & Stoughton Religious, ISBN 0-340-64201-7
- Stafford Cripps: The First Modern Chancellor by Chris Bryant, 1997, Hodder & Stoughton Ltd, ISBN 0-340-67892-5
- Glenda Jackson: The Biography by Chris Bryant, 1999, HarperCollins, ISBN 0-00-255911-0
- Parliament: The Biography: Ancestral Voices (Vol. 1) by Chris Bryant, 2014, Doubleday, ISBN 978-0857520685
- Parliament: The Biography: Reform (Vol. 2) by Chris Bryant, 2014, Doubleday, ISBN 978-0857522245
- Entitled: A Critical History of the British Aristocracy by Chris Bryant, 2017, Doubleday ISBN 978-0857523167
- The Glamour Boys: The Secret Story of the Rebels who Fought for Britain to Defeat Hitler by Chris Bryant, 2020, Bloomsbury Publishing, ISBN 978-1526601711
- Code of Conduct: Why We Need to Fix Parliament by Chris Bryant, 2023, Bloomsbury Publishing, ISBN 978-1526663597
- James and John: A True Story of Prejudice and Murder by Chris Bryant, 2024, Bloomsbury Publishing, ISBN 978-1526644978
- A Life and a Half: The Unexpected Making of a Politician by Chris Bryant, 2025, Bloomsbury Publishing, ISBN 978-1526680914

Parliament of the United Kingdom
Preceded by Allan Rogers	Member of Parliament for Rhondda; 2001–2024	Constituency abolished
New constituency	Member of Parliament for Rhondda and Ogmore; 2024–present	Incumbent
Political offices
Preceded by Helen Goodman	Deputy Leader of the House of Commons; 2008–2009	Succeeded by Barbara Keeley
Preceded by Gillian Merron	Undersecretary of State for Foreign Affairs; 2009–2010	Succeeded by Henry Bellingham
Preceded by The Baroness Kinnock of Holyhead as Minister of State for Europe	Undersecretary of State for Europe and Asia; 2009–2010	Succeeded by David Lidington as Minister of State for Europe
New office	Shadow Minister for Political Reform; 2010–2011	Succeeded by Wayne David
Preceded by Gerry Sutcliffe	Shadow Minister for Immigration; 2011–2013	Succeeded by David Hanson
Preceded by Ian Austin	Shadow Minister for Welfare Reform; 2013–2014	Succeeded by Helen Goodman
Preceded by Helen Goodman	Shadow Minister for the Arts; 2014–2015	Vacant
Preceded by Harriet Harman	Shadow Secretary of State for Culture, Media and Sport; 2015	Succeeded by Michael Dugher
Preceded by Angela Eagle	Shadow Leader of the House of Commons; 2015–2016	Succeeded by Paul Flynn
