= Gilbert Granville Sharp =

British politician and barrister

Gilbert Granville Sharp, KC (19 February 1894 – 1 November 1968), was a British Liberal Party politician and barrister.

== Background ==
He was the born in Mafeking, (now in South Africa) where his father, Reverend Alfred Spring Sharp of Prestatyn, Flintshire, was a Methodist missionary. His mother, Amelia Adelaide Latham, was the granddaughter of an 1820 Settler from London. Sharp had one brother and two sisters. He was educated at Kingswood School and Fitzwilliam College, Cambridge. BA, LLB Cambs., 1919. He was President of Cambridge Union in 1921 and the Cambridge University Liberal Club from 1920 to 1921. He married, in 1915, Margaret Featherstone Kellett. They had one daughter. He married, in 1953, Eleanor Christina Brooke (née Herron).

== Early career ==
He was in World War I military service, 1914–18, Public Schools Battalion and 2nd Scottish Border Regiment, Lieut, France, 1915–16 (wounded in the Battle of the Somme); Special Instructor of Signals, 1917.

== Legal career ==
He was Called to the bar, Middle Temple, in 1921. He was President Hardwicke Society, 1924. He was Recorder of King's Lynn, 1943–57. He was Chief of Legal and Advice Branch, Legal Division (British Section), Austrian Control Commission, 1944–45. He was General Council of the Bar, 1946–48; He was appointed a King's Counsel in 1948. He was Justice of Appeal of the Supreme Court, Ghana, 1957–62. He was a Commissioner in the Crown Courts, Manchester, 1963–67, and Liverpool, 1965-67.

== Political career ==
He was President of Cambridge University Liberal Club, 1921. He was Liberal candidate for the Epping Division of Essex at the 1922, 1923, 1924, 1929, and 1935 General Elections. Epping was a safe Conservative seat which had never returned a Liberal. Sharp stood as a candidate for the party that was led by H. H. Asquith rather than that led by David Lloyd George.

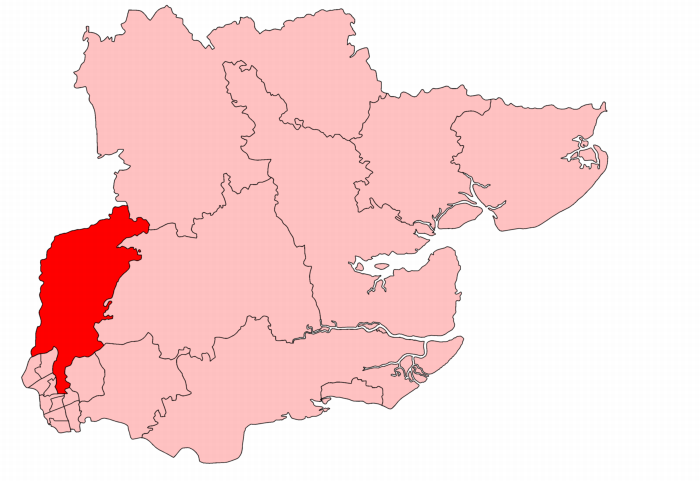
Epping in Essex, showing boundaries used from 1918 to 1945.

General Election 1922 : Epping Electorate 40,209
Party	Candidate	Votes	%	±%
Unionist	Richard Colvin	15,300	59.9	−12.7
Liberal	Gilbert Granville Sharp	10,228	40.1	
Majority		5,072	19.8	
Turnout			63.5	+11.1
Unionist hold		Swing		

A now united Liberal Party had a resurgence at the next election and Sharp came his closest to winning Epping;

General Election 1923: Epping Electorate 41,404
Party	Candidate	Votes	%	±%
Unionist	Leonard Lyle	14,528	52.9	−7.0
Liberal	Gilbert Granville Sharp	12,954	47.1	+7.0
Majority		1,574	5.8	−14.0
Turnout			66.4	
Unionist hold		Swing		

Former Liberal Winston Churchill was Sharp's opponent at the next election, standing as a Constitutionalist. Although Churchill had not yet re-joined the Unionists, he stood with their local support;

General Election 1924: Epping Electorate 43,055
Party	Candidate	Votes	%	±%
Constitutionalist	Winston Churchill	19,843	58.9	
Liberal	Gilbert Granville Sharp	10,080	29.9	
Labour	J R McPhie	3,768	11.2	
Majority		9,763	29.0	
Turnout			78.3	
Constitutionalist hold		Swing		

The Liberal Party, now led by Lloyd George, was challenging strongly both nationally and locally, and for the first time in Epping since the war, the Unionist vote dropped below 50%;

General Election 1929: Epping Electorate 65,758
Party	Candidate	Votes	%	±%
Unionist	Winston Churchill	23,972	48.5	
Liberal	Gilbert Granville Sharp	19,005	38.4	
Labour	J T W Newbould	6,472	13.1	
Majority		4,967	10.1	
Turnout			75.2	
Unionist hold		Swing		

Following the formation of the National government, he did not contest a seat at the 1931 General Election. Epping Liberals chose another Liberal candidate who managed to retain second place. He returned to contest Epping at the next election, polling his lowest share of the vote. This was the last time he contested Epping;

General Election 1935 Electorate 87,177
Party	Candidate	Votes	%	±%
Conservative	Winston Churchill	34,849	59.03	
Liberal	Gilbert Granville Sharp	14,430	24.44	
Labour	J. Ranger	9,758	16.53	
Majority		20,419	34.59	
Turnout			67.72	
Conservative hold		Swing		

He was elected a Member of the Liberal Party Council in 1941. He did not contest a seat at the 1945 General Election. He was appointed to the Royal Commission on the Press, serving from 1947 to 1949. He was Liberal candidate for the newly created Cornwall seat of Falmouth and Camborne at the 1950 General Election. Although Cornwall was a county where the Liberal Party support was strong, in this part of the county, Labour was established as the main alternative to the Conservatives and he finished a distant third;

General Election 1950: Falmouth & Camborne Electorate 53,248
Party	Candidate	Votes	%	±%
Labour	Harold Hayman	18,988	43.2	
Conservative	Peter Agnew	16,997	38.6	
Liberal	Gilbert Granville Sharp	8,013	18.2	
Majority		1,991	4.5	
Turnout			82.6	
Labour hold		Swing		

He was a Governor of Guy's Hospital.

== Publications ==
Co-edited with Brian Galpin, Maxwell on the Interpretation of Statutes, 10th edition, 1953.

== Death ==
Sharp died on 1 November 1968 at the age of 74.

== See also ==
- List of judges of the Supreme Court of Ghana
- Supreme Court of Ghana
- List of Cambridge Union Society presidents
