= 1917 Epping by-election =

UK Parliamentary by-election

The 1917 Epping by-election was held on 28 June 1917. The by-election was held due to the elevation to the peerage of the incumbent Conservative MP, Amelius Lockwood. The only candidate was the Conservative Richard Colvin, who was elected unopposed.
