= Finlay baronets =

Baronetcy in the Baronetage of the United Kingdom

The Finlay Baronetcy, of Epping in the County of Essex, is a title in the Baronetage of the United Kingdom. It was created on 31 December 1964 for the Conservative politician Graeme Finlay. He had previously represented Epping in the House of Commons. As of 2021 the title is held by his grandson, the third baronet, who succeeded in that year.

== Finlay baronets, of Epping (1964) ==
- Sir Graeme Bell Finlay, 1st Baronet (1917–1987)
- Sir David Ronald James Bell Finlay, 2nd Baronet (1963–2021)
- Sir Tristan James Bell Finlay, 3rd baronet (born 2001).

There is no heir.

Coat of arms of Finlay baronets

Crest
In front of an oak tree fructed a whippet sejant Proper gorged with an ancient coronet pendent therefrom by the chains a portcullis Azure.
Escutcheon
Argent on a chevron Azure between in chief two roses Gules barbed and seeded Proper and in base an estoile of eight points Gules within two wings conjoined and erect Azure an ancient coronet Or.
Motto
Be Just

== Notes ==
Baronetage of the United Kingdom
Preceded by Redmayne baronets	Finlay baronets of Epping; 31 December 1964	Succeeded by Pearson baronets
