= Peter Edwin Lewis =

British judge and Liberal Party politician

- Born: 8 December 1912
- Died: 7 January 1976 (aged 63); Brighton, Sussex, England
- Occupations: Barrister and Judge

His Honour Peter Edwin Lewis (8 December 1912 – 7 January 1976), was a British judge and Liberal Party politician.

== Background ==
He was the son of Frederick Herbert Lewis. He was educated at Malvern College and University College, Oxford, where he took honours in Law (BA, BCL). In 1948 he married Mary Ruth Massey. They had three sons and one daughter.

== Professional career ==
In 1937 he was called to the Bar by the Inner Temple and practised as a barrister. From 1940-47 he served with the Intelligence branch of the Royal Air Force. In 1972 he became a Circuit Judge on South Eastern Circuit.

== Political career ==
He was Liberal candidate for the Epping division of Essex at the 1950 General Election. In a difficult election for the Liberal Party he finished third;

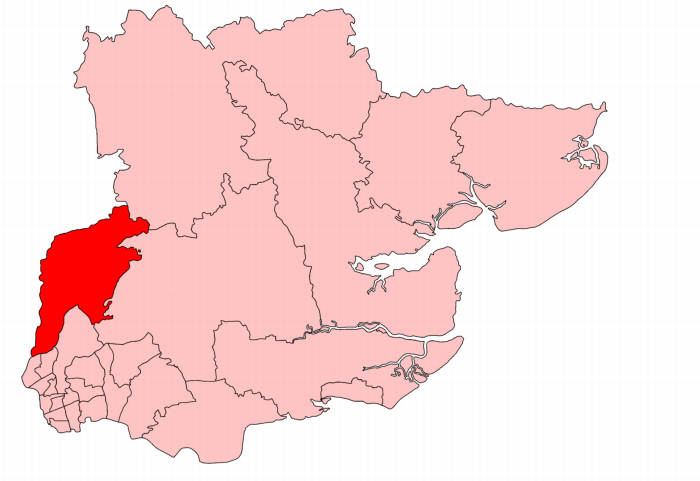
Epping in Essex, showing 1950 boundaries

General Election 1950: Epping
Party	Candidate	Votes	%	±%
Conservative	Nigel Davies	24,292	49.1	
Labour	Leah Manning	20,385	41.2	
Liberal	Peter Edwin Lewis	4,755	9.6	
Majority		3,907	7.9	
Turnout		49,432	86.6	
Conservative gain from Labour		Swing		

He did not stand for parliament again.
