= Michael Dobbs (journalist) =

Anglo-American non-fiction author and journalist (born 1950)

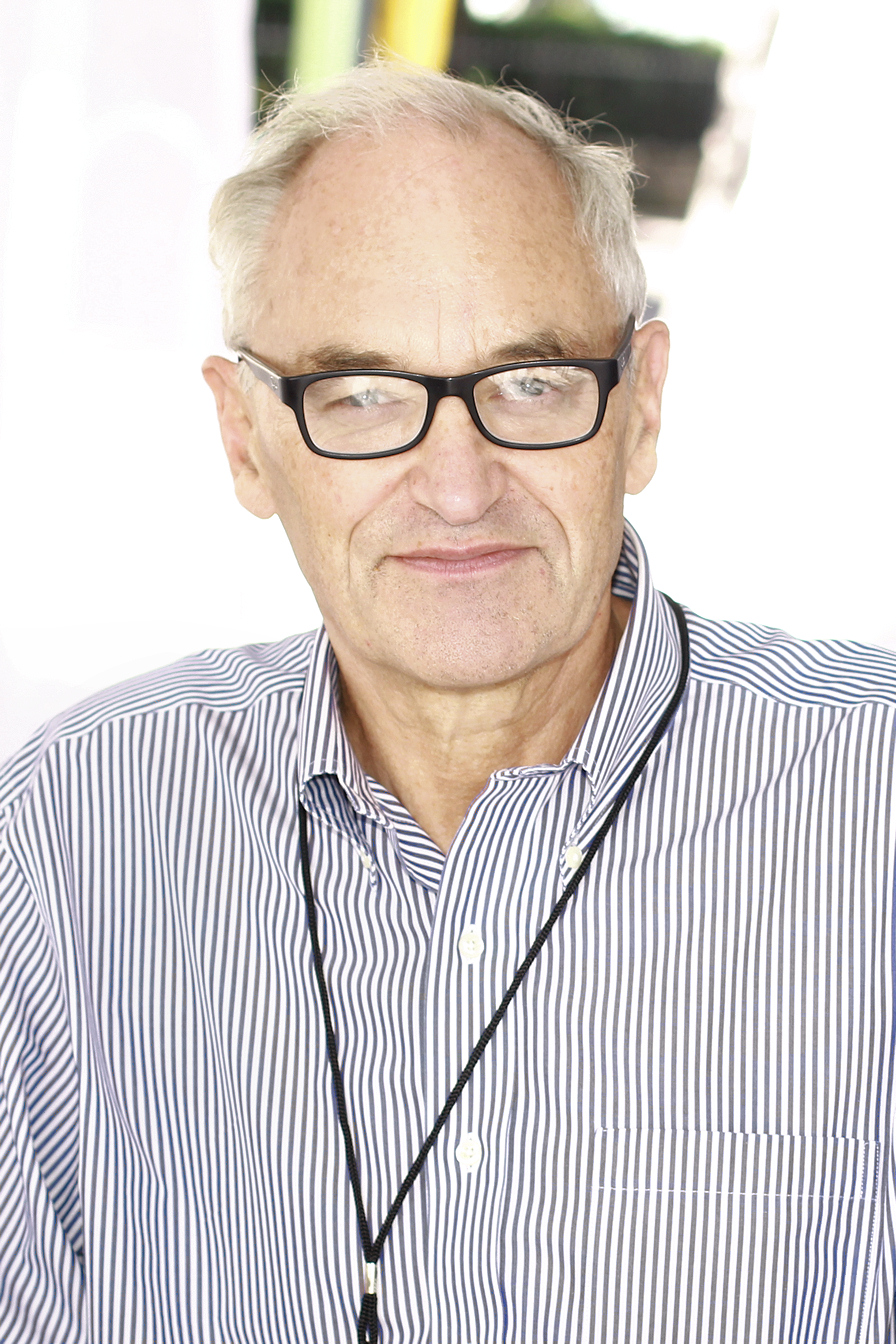
Dobbs at the 2019 Texas Book Festival

Michael Dobbs (born 27 July 1950) is a British-American non-fiction author and journalist.

== Early life and education ==
Dobbs was born in Belfast, Northern Ireland and graduated from the University of York in 1972, with a BA in Economics & Economic History, and completed fellowships at Princeton and Harvard. He became a U.S. citizen in 2010.

== Career ==
Dobbs spent much of his career as a foreign correspondent covering the collapse of communism. He was the first Western reporter to visit the Gdansk shipyard in August 1980; he also covered the Tiananmen Square uprising in China in 1989, the abortive coup against Mikhail Gorbachev in August 1991, and the wars in the former Yugoslavia. He joined The Washington Post in 1980, when he was appointed bureau chief in eastern Europe (1980–1981), based in Warsaw. He was also bureau chief in Paris (1982–1986) and Moscow (1988–1993). Other assignments included stints in Rome for Reuters news agency (1974–1975), in Africa as a freelancer (1976), and as a special correspondent in Belgrade (1977–1980), when he covered the death of Marshal Josip Broz Tito.

In Washington, he worked for the Post as a United States Department of State reporter and as a foreign investigative reporter, covering the Dayton peace process. During the U.S. presidential campaign in 2008, he returned to the newspaper to launch its online "Fact Checker" column.

Dobbs is the author of the "Cold War trilogy", a series of books about the climactic moments of the Cold War. His Down with Big Brother: The Fall of The Soviet Empire was a runner-up for the 1997 PEN award for nonfiction. His hour-by-hour study of the Cuban Missile Crisis, One Minute to Midnight: Kennedy, Khrushchev, and Castro on the Brink of Nuclear War, was a finalist for the 2008 Los Angeles Times history prize and was named one of five non-fiction books of the year by The Washington Post. The final book in the trilogy, Six Months in 1945: From World War to Cold War (Knopf, 2012), describes the division of Europe into American and Soviet spheres of influence after World War II.

His 2019 book, The Unwanted: America, Auschwitz, and a Village Caught in Between won the Jewish Book Club Award for Holocaust Studies. It tells the story of Jewish families desperately seeking American visas to escape Nazi Germany during the years leading up to the Holocaust. Earlier books include a biography of former Secretary of State Madeleine Albright and Saboteurs: The Nazi Raid on America, about a bungled Nazi sabotage attempt directed against the United States in 1942.

Michael Dobbs was a visiting professor in the Department of Communications Studies at the University of Michigan from 2010–2011; he has also taught at Princeton, Georgetown, and American universities. He was a staff member of the U.S. Holocaust Museum, where he organized conferences of international decision-makers on the genocides in Rwanda and Bosnia. He also covered the genocide trial of former Bosnian Serb military commander Ratko Mladić for Foreign Policy magazine.

Dobbs's most recent book is King Richard: Nixon and Watergate - an American Tragedy, (Knopf, 2021) which earned starred reviews from Publishers Weekly and Kirkus, and was described as "intimate and extraordinary" by Jennifer Szalai in The New York Times.

=== Bibliography ===
Title	Year	ISBN	Publisher	Subject matter	Interviews, presentations, and reviews	Comments
Down With Big Brother: The Fall of the Soviet Empire	1997	ISBN 9780679431794	Knopf	History of the Soviet Union (1982–1991), Dissolution of the Soviet Union		
Madeleine Albright: A Twentieth-Century Odyssey	1999	ISBN 9780805056594	Henry Holt and Co.	Madeleine Albright	Presentation by Dobbs on Madeleine Albright, May 14, 1999	
Saboteurs: The Nazi Raid on America	2004	ISBN 9780375414701	Knopf	Operation Pastorius	Booknotes interview with Dobbs on Saboteurs: The Nazi Raid on America, March 28, 2004.	
Six Months in 1945: From World War to Cold War	2012	ISBN 9780307271655	Knopf		Presentation by Dobbs on Six Months in 1945, September 11, 2013	
One Minute to Midnight: Kennedy, Khrushchev, and Castro on the Brink of Nuclear War	2008	ISBN 9781400043583	Knopf	Cuban Missile Crisis	Presentation by Dobbs on One Minute to Midnight, September 27, 2008; Washington Journal interview with Dobbs on One Minute to Midnight, August 16, 2017	
The Unwanted: America, Auschwitz, and a Village Caught in Between	2019	ISBN 9781524733193	Knopf		Presentation by Dobbs on The Unwanted, May 15, 2019	
King Richard: An American Tragedy	2021	ISBN 9780385350099	Knopf	Richard Nixon, Watergate scandal		

== Personal life ==
Dobbs, who lives outside Washington D.C., is a distant relative of Michael Dobbs, the British politician and author of the political thriller House of Cards.
