= Winston's War =

2002 novel by Michael Dobbs

- First edition HarperCollins cover art
- Author: Michael Dobbs
- Language: English
- Series: Churchill
- Genre: Historical novel
- Publisher: HarperCollins
- Publication date: 2002
- Publication place: United Kingdom
- Media type: Print (hardback and paperback)
- Pages: 487
- ISBN: 0-00-713018-X
- OCLC: 48885056
- Dewey Decimal: 823/.914 22
- LC Class: PR6054.O23 W56 2002
- Followed by: Never Surrender

Winston's War is a 2002 novel by Michael Dobbs that presents a fictional account of the struggle of Winston Churchill to combat the appeasement policies of Prime Minister Neville Chamberlain.

== Plot summary ==
The story starts with Chamberlain's 1938 triumphant return to 10 Downing Street, a public hero after the signing of the Munich Agreement with Adolf Hitler, declaring "peace in our time." The story ends with the fall of the Chamberlain Government, and the appointment of Churchill as Prime Minister.

Churchill, relegated to the periphery of British politics by the late 1930s, lashes out against appeasement despite having almost no support from fellow parliamentarians or the British press. The novel includes many of the momentous historical personages of the day: Chamberlain, the ailing and pacifist Prime Minister; Churchill, the political outcast, whose pugnacity created opprobrium in the public eye; Joseph Kennedy, the U.S. Ambassador to the Court of St. James's; Guy Burgess, an alcoholic BBC journalist of later Cold War infamy; the machiavellian newspaper mogul Max Aitken (Lord Beaverbrook), and the stuttering and insecure King George VI, who personally detests Churchill and tries to persuade his good friend, Lord Halifax, to take the reins of leadership.

Winston's War is the first in a series of novels by Dobbs about Churchill's wartime leadership. The sequel Never Surrender continues the storyline over the first few weeks of Churchill's premiership.
