= Chingford (constituency) =

UK Parliament constituency (1974–1997)

Coordinates: 51.63°N 0.00°E

- Former constituency for the House of Commons
- County: Greater London

February 1974–1997
- Seats: One
- Created from: Epping and Walthamstow East
- Replaced by: Chingford & Woodford Green, Walthamstow

Chingford was a parliamentary constituency centred on the town of Chingford in the London Borough of Waltham Forest. It returned one Member of Parliament (MP) to the House of Commons of the Parliament of the United Kingdom by the first past the post system.

== History ==
Historically having Chingford as part of Epping in South-West Essex, the constituency existed from February 1974 until it was abolished for the 1997 general election. It was held by the Conservative Party throughout this period. Both of its former Members of Parliament are well known, being Norman Tebbit and Iain Duncan Smith.

== Boundaries ==
1974–1983: The London Borough of Waltham Forest wards of Chapel End, Chingford Central, Chingford North West, Chingford South, and Hale End.

1983–1997: The London Borough of Waltham Forest wards of Chapel End, Chingford Green, Endlebury, Hale End, Hatch Lane, Larkswood, and Valley.

The seat was created out of the old Epping and Walthamstow East constituencies, and no part of it was ever in the post-1965 administrative county of Essex. It was replaced in 1997 by the new Chingford and Woodford Green constituency.

== Members of Parliament ==
Election	Member	Party
Feb 1974	Norman Tebbit	Conservative
1992	Iain Duncan Smith	Conservative
1997	constituency abolished: see Chingford and Woodford Green & Walthamstow	

== Elections ==
=== Elections in the 1970s ===
General election February 1974: Chingford
Party	Candidate	Votes	%	±%
Conservative	Norman Tebbit	19,921	43.1	
Labour	M.A. Gerrard	14,238	30.8	
Liberal	D.A. Nicholson	12,060	26.1	
Majority		5,683	12.3	
Turnout		46,219	81.8	
Conservative win (new seat)				

General election October 1974: Chingford
Party	Candidate	Votes	%	±%
Conservative	Norman Tebbit	19,022	45.5	+2.4
Labour	Paul F. Tinnion	14,377	34.4	+3.6
Liberal	D.A. Nicholson	8,438	20.2	−5.9
Majority		4,645	11.1	−1.2
Turnout		41,837	73.4	−8.4
Conservative hold		Swing	−0.6	

General election 1979: Chingford
Party	Candidate	Votes	%	±%
Conservative	Norman Tebbit	24,640	56.1	+10.6
Labour	Neil Gerrard	12,257	27.9	−6.5
Liberal	D.A. Nicholson	5,225	11.9	−8.3
National Front	D. South	1,157	2.6	New
Ecology	Stephen Lambert	649	1.5	New
Majority		12,383	28.2	+17.1
Turnout		43,928	78.4	+5.0
Conservative hold		Swing	+8.6	

=== Elections in the 1980s ===
General election 1983: Chingford
Party	Candidate	Votes	%	±%
Conservative	Norman Tebbit	22,541	55.1	−1.0
Liberal	Richard Hoskins	10,127	24.8	+12.9
Labour	William Shepherd	7,239	17.7	−10.2
Ecology	John Morgan	479	1.2	−0.3
National Front	Brent A. Cheetham	380	0.9	−1.7
Independent	J.C. Neighbour	104	0.2	New
Independent	S.J.A. Barklem	34	0.1	New
Majority		12,414	30.3	+2.1
Turnout		40,904	72.7	−5.7
Conservative hold		Swing		

General election 1987: Chingford
Party	Candidate	Votes	%	±%
Conservative	Norman Tebbit	27,110	62.2	+7.1
Liberal	John Williams	9,155	21.0	−3.8
Labour	Margaret Cosin	6,650	15.3	−2.4
Green	Elizabeth Newton	634	1.5	+0.3
Majority		17,955	41.2	+10.9
Turnout		43,549	76.7	+4.0
Conservative hold		Swing	+5.5	

=== Elections in the 1990s ===
General election 1992: Chingford
Party	Candidate	Votes	%	±%
Conservative	Iain Duncan Smith	25,730	59.2	−3.0
Labour	Peter J. Dawe	10,792	24.8	+9.5
Liberal Democrats	Simon G. Banks	5,705	13.1	−7.9
Liberal	David W. Green	602	1.4	New
Green	John M. Baguley	575	1.3	−0.2
Independent	Christine M. Johns	41	0.1	New
Majority		14,938	34.4	−6.8
Turnout		43,445	78.3	+1.6
Conservative hold		Swing	−6.3	

Parliament of the United Kingdom
Preceded by Epping	UK Parliament constituency Feb 1974 – 1997	Succeeded by Chingford and Woodford Green
Preceded by Walthamstow East	UK Parliament constituency Feb 1974 – 1997	Succeeded by Chingford and Woodford Green
