= Graeme Finlay =

Sir Graeme Bell Finlay, 1st Baronet, ERD (29 October 1917 – 21 January 1987 (aged 69), was a Conservative Party politician in the United Kingdom.

Finlay was son of James Bell Pettigrew Finlay, of Portskewett House, near Chepstow, Monmouthshire, an engineer, and his wife Margaret Helena, daughter of John Euston Davies. He was educated at Marlborough, and at University College London, then entered Gray's Inn in 1946, becoming a barrister. During the Second World War, he served in the South Wales Borderers and reached the rank of Major.

He was elected at the 1951 general election as member of parliament (MP) for the Epping constituency in Essex. He was re-elected in 1955 and 1959, and held the seat until his defeat at the 1964 general election by the Labour candidate Stan Newens.

While in Parliament, Finlay served in government as an Assistant Government Whip from 1957 to 1959, a Lord Commissioner of the Treasury from 1959 to 1960, and Vice Chamberlain of the Royal Household to Elizabeth II from 1960 until 1964.

On 31 December 1964 he was created a baronet, of Epping in the County of Essex.

After Parliament, Finlay sat as a County Court and Deputy Circuit Judge from 1967 to 1972, then, having settled in Jersey, he was Assistant Juge d'Instruction and Judge of the Petty Debts Court in Jersey from 1972 to 1977. He settled on the island, where he was living at Rozel near St Martin in 1982.

Finlay married June Evangeline, daughter of Colonel Francis Collingwood Drake, in 1953. They had three children: a son and heir to the baronetcy, David, and two daughters, Fiona and Catrina. Lady Finlay died on 19 October 2022.

Coat of arms of Graeme Finlay

Crest
In front of an oak tree fructed a whippet sejant Proper gorged with an ancient coronet pendent therefrom by the chains a portcullis Azure.
Escutcheon
Argent on a chevron Azure between in chief two roses Gules barbed and seeded Proper and in base an estoile of eight points Gules within two wings conjoined and erect Azure an ancient coronet Or.
Motto
Be Just

Parliament of the United Kingdom
| Preceded by Nigel Davies | Member of Parliament for Epping; 1951–1964 | Succeeded by Stan Newens |
Baronetage of the United Kingdom
| New creation | Baronet (of Epping); 1964–1987 | Succeeded by David Ronald James Bell Finlay |
