= Whispers of Betrayal =

- First edition (publ. HarperCollins)
- Author: Michael Dobbs
- Language: English
- Publication date: 2000

Whispers of Betrayal is a 2000 novel by Michael Dobbs that tells the third story in the Tom Goodfellowe series. It details a group of military officers who try to topple the Prime Minister.

== Character list ==
- Tom Goodfellowe MP - Backbench MP, protagonist, offered a senior Cabinet job by Vertue at the end of the novel.
- Colonel Peter Amadeus - Army Officer who wants to bring down the Prime Minister.
- Jonathan Bendall MP - UK Prime Minister, resigns at the end of the book, served for 3 and a half years. Based on Tony Blair
- George Vertue MP - Chancellor of the Exchequer, becomes Prime Minister after Bendall's resignation, based on Gordon Brown
- Noel O. Hope MP - Was the Home Secretary, forced to resign by Bendall, initials were N.O Hope, based on Jack Straw
- Gerald Earwick MP - Defence Secretary, succeeds Hope as Home Secretary, served for around a month before being forced to resign over a gay affair leaked by the plotters. Based on David Blunkett
- Colonel Abel Gittings OBE - Former Signals Officer, senior Ministry of Defence official. Was Mary's commanding officer
- Mary - A soldier in the Signals regiment who joins Amadeus in his plot.
- Scully - A soldier who is divorced who joins Amadeus as well, dies destroying Battersea power station
- McKenzie - Another plotter
- Payne - Another plotter
- Lord "Frankie" - Lord Chancellor, personal friend of Bendall, based on Charles Falconer.
- Eddie Rankin MP - Chief Whip, knows Goodfellowe personally. Based on Nick Brown
- Dame Patricia - senior civil servant, Cabinet Secretary
