= Norman Tebbit =

British politician (1931–2025)

The Right Honourable The Lord Tebbit CH PC
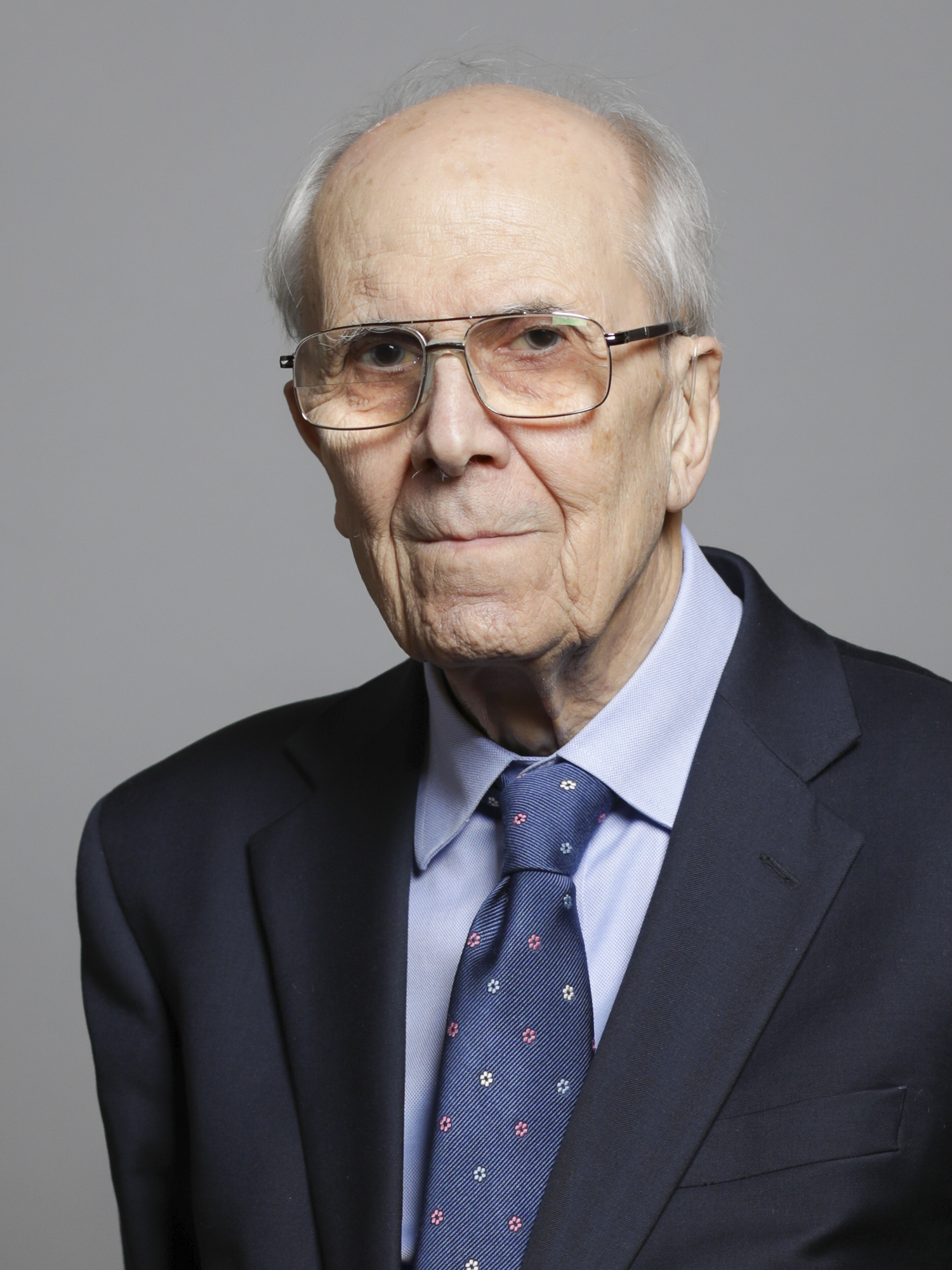
- Official portrait, 2020

Chairman of the Conservative Party
- In office 2 September 1985 – 13 June 1987
- Leader: Margaret Thatcher
- Preceded by: John Gummer
- Succeeded by: Peter Brooke

Chancellor of the Duchy of Lancaster
- In office 2 September 1985 – 13 June 1987
- Prime Minister: Margaret Thatcher
- Preceded by: The Earl of Gowrie
- Succeeded by: Kenneth Clarke

Secretary of State for Trade and Industry; President of the Board of Trade
- In office 16 October 1983 – 2 September 1985
- Prime Minister: Margaret Thatcher
- Preceded by: Cecil Parkinson
- Succeeded by: Leon Brittan

Secretary of State for Employment
- In office 14 September 1981 – 16 October 1983
- Prime Minister: Margaret Thatcher
- Preceded by: Jim Prior
- Succeeded by: Tom King

Minister of State for Industry
- In office 5 January 1981 – 14 September 1981
- Prime Minister: Margaret Thatcher
- Preceded by: The Viscount Trenchard
- Succeeded by: Norman Lamont

Parliamentary Under-Secretary of State for Trade
- In office 4 May 1979 – 5 January 1981
- Prime Minister: Margaret Thatcher
- Preceded by: Michael Meacher
- Succeeded by: The Lord Trefgarne

Member of the House of Lords
- Lord Temporal
- Life peerage 6 July 1992 – 31 March 2022

Member of Parliament for Chingford Epping (1970–1974)
- In office 18 June 1970 – 16 March 1992
- Preceded by: Stan Newens
- Succeeded by: Iain Duncan Smith

Personal details
- Born: Norman Beresford Tebbit; 29 March 1931 Ponders End, Middlesex, England
- Died: 7 July 2025 (aged 94) Bury St Edmunds, Suffolk, England
- Party: Conservative
- Spouse: Margaret Daines (m. 1956; died 2020)
- Children: 3
- Occupation: Politician; journalist; pilot

Military service
- Allegiance: United Kingdom
- Branch: Royal Air Force
- Service years: 1950–1956
- Rank: Flying officer

Norman Beresford Tebbit, Baron Tebbit (29 March 1931 – 7 July 2025), was a British politician. A member of the Conservative Party, he served in Margaret Thatcher's Cabinet from 1981 to 1987 as Secretary of State for Employment (1981–1983), Secretary of State for Trade and Industry (1983–1985), and Chancellor of the Duchy of Lancaster and Chairman of the Conservative Party (1985–1987). He was a member of Parliament (MP) from 1970 to 1992, representing the constituencies of Epping (1970–1974) and Chingford (1974–1992).

In 1984, Tebbit was injured in the bombing of the Grand Hotel in Brighton, where he was staying during the Conservative Party Conference, by the Provisional IRA. His wife Margaret was left permanently disabled after the explosion. He left the Cabinet following the 1987 general election to care for his wife.

Tebbit considered standing for the Conservative leadership following Thatcher's resignation in 1990 but decided not to as he had earlier made a commitment to his wife to retire from front-line politics. He did not seek re-election as MP for Chingford in 1992 and was given a life peerage as Baron Tebbit, of Chingford. He retired from the House of Lords in 2022.

== Early life and career ==
Born in Ponders End, Middlesex, on 29 March 1931, to working-class parents Leonard and Edith Tebbit, he went to Edmonton County Grammar School, which was then an academically selective state school in north London.

At the age of 16, Tebbit got a job with the Financial Times and had to join NATSOPA. Disliking rules that caused members who criticised union officials to be fined or expelled (and thus lose their jobs), he recalled vowing to "break the power of the closed shop".

In 1949, Tebbit joined the Royal Air Force for national service. After training, he was commissioned in the rank of pilot officer in November 1950. He transferred to the Royal Air Force Volunteer Reserve (RAFVR) in November 1951, to continue his national service on a part-time basis. During his time in the air force, Tebbit flew Meteor and Vampire jets. In July 1954, at RAF Waterbeach near Cambridge, he had to escape from a burning Meteor 8 which had crashed off the end of the runway by breaking open the canopy. After completing his national service, he transferred to the Royal Auxiliary Air Force (RAuxAF) in April 1952, and was promoted to flying officer.

From 1951 to 1953, Tebbit worked in publishing and advertising. In 1953, Tebbit joined British Overseas Airways Corporation (BOAC) as a navigator and pilot. Initially, between 1952 and 1955, continued to fly in RAuxAF the with 604 (County of Middlesex) Squadron at North Weald in Essex. Of his airline navigation training, he later said: "In those days it was a considerable academic syllabus. You had to be up to speed on spherical trigonometry to get through it". During his time at BOAC, he was an official in the British Airline Pilots' Association.

== Member of Parliament ==
Tebbit was elected as MP for Epping in 1970 and then for Chingford in February 1974. He is recorded as an MP member of the Conservative Monday Club in 1970.

Tebbit's first intervention as an MP was to ask a question of the then Minister at the Board of Trade, Frederick Corfield, on 6 July 1970. His question was on the subject of a crash of a Comet-4 aircraft in Spain on 3 July, which killed all the 112 people on board at the time.

In 1975, six men (the 'Ferrybridge Six') were dismissed from their jobs because of the introduction of a closed shop (an arrangement that only union members could be employed) and were denied unemployment benefit. The Secretary of State for Employment, Michael Foot, commented: "A person who declines to fall in with new conditions of employment which result from a collective agreement may well be considered to have brought about his own dismissal". Tebbit accused Foot of "pure undiluted fascism" and affirmed that this "left Mr Foot exposed as a bitter opponent of freedom and liberty". The next day (2 December) The Times first leader —titled "IS MR FOOT A FASCIST?"—quoted Tebbit and went on:

Mr Foot's doctrine is intolerable because it is a violation of the liberty of the ordinary man in his job. Mr Tebbit is therefore using fascism in a legitimate descriptive sense when he accuses Mr. Foot of it. We perhaps need to revive the phrase "social fascism" to describe the modern British development of the corporate state and its bureaucratic attack on personal liberty. The question is not therefore: "is Mr. Foot a fascist?" but "does Mr. Foot know he is a fascist?"

During the Grunwick dispute, when workers went on strike over pay and working conditions, the owner George Ward refused to recognise their trade union, and there was a split in the Conservative Shadow Cabinet between the conciliatory approach of Jim Prior, the Shadow Employment Secretary, and Keith Joseph. Tebbit involved himself in that dispute by making a controversial speech on 12 September 1977, in which he said:

Inside Britain there is a ... threat from the Marxist collectivist totalitarians. ... Just to state that fact is to be accused of 'union-bashing'. ... Such people are to be found in the Conservative, Liberal and Labour Parties. Their politics may be different but such people share the morality of Laval and Pétain ... they are willing not only to tolerate evil, but to excuse it. ... Both Jim Prior and Keith Joseph know that George Ward and Grunwick are not perfect, nor was Czechoslovakia perfect in 1938. But if Ward and Grunwick are destroyed by the red fascists, then, as in 1938, we will have to ask, whose turn is it next? Yes, it is like 1938. We can all see the evil, but the doctrine of appeasement is still to be heard.

Tebbit was accused of comparing Prior to Laval and at that year's Conservative Party conference, he attempted to avoid personalising the issue, and openly splitting the party, without retracting what he had said. Tebbit said of these differences: "I'm a hawk—but no kamikaze. And Jim's a dove—but he's not chicken".

During a debate in the Commons on 2 March 1978, Michael Foot likened Tebbit to a "semi-house-trained polecat" in response to a question from Tebbit asking if he accepted that the legislation being proposed that made it compulsory for people to join a trade union was an act of fascism. After he was made Lord Tebbit in 1992, he chose a winged polecat as a supporter on his coat of arms. Later, in the debate Tebbit asked Foot whether he would "put a bridle on his foul-mouthed tongue".

=== First Thatcher ministry ===
After the Conservative Party regained power after the general election of 1979, Tebbit was appointed Under-Secretary at the Ministry of Trade.

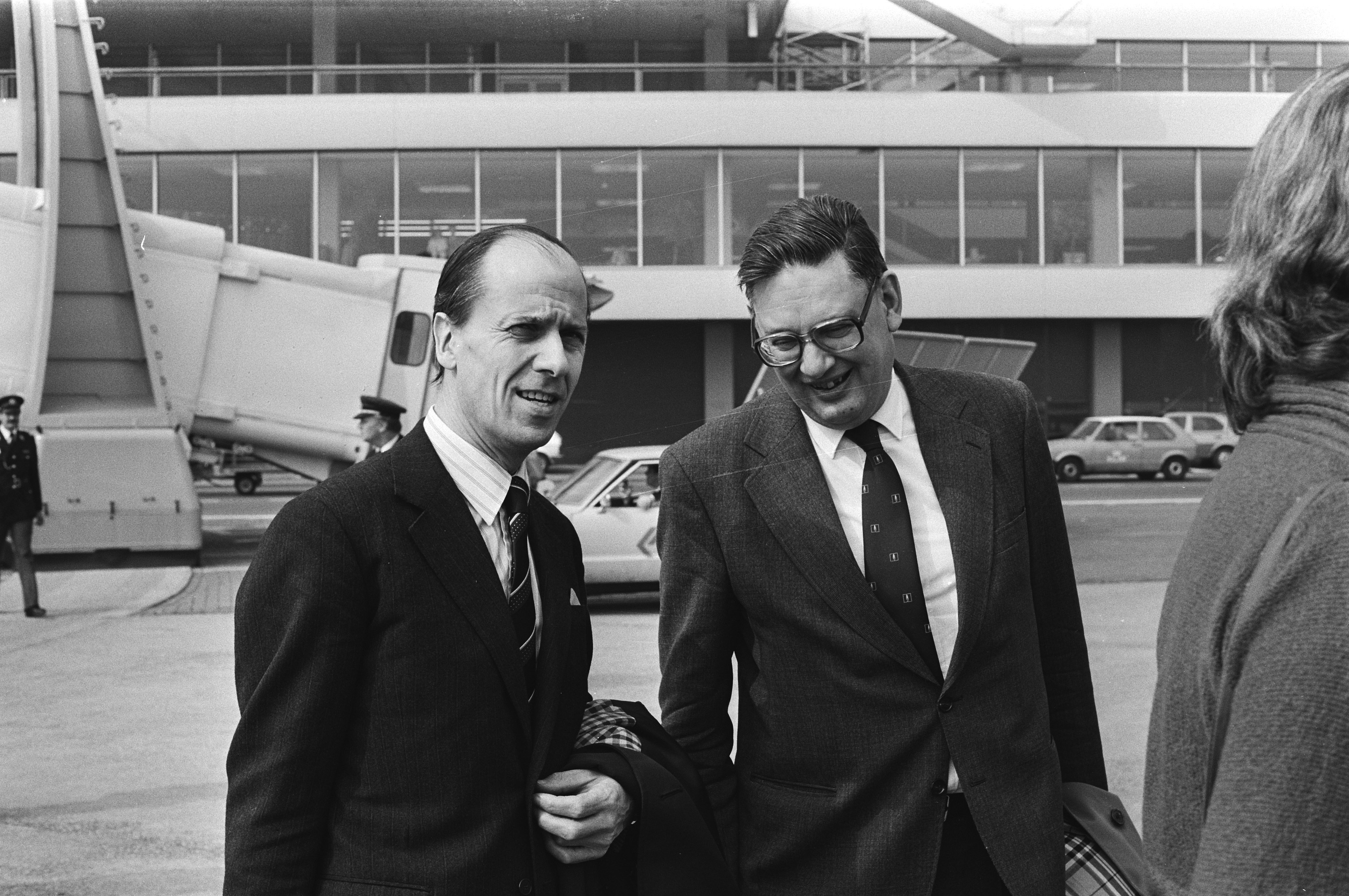
Tebbit (left) with then Dutch Minister of Economic Affairs Gijs van Aardenne (right) in 1981

In the September 1981 Cabinet reshuffle, Thatcher appointed Tebbit as Employment Secretary. This was seen as a shift to a 'tougher' approach to the trade unions than had been the case under Tebbit's predecessor, Jim Prior. Tebbit introduced the Employment Act 1982 which raised the level of compensation for those unfairly dismissed from a closed shop and prohibited closed shops unless 80% of relevant workers approved the arrangement in periodic ballots. It also removed trade unions' immunity from liability in tort – i.e. made trade unions liable for civil damages if they committed unlawful acts, and made injunctions possible against such acts. In his memoirs Tebbit said that the 1982 Act was his "greatest achievement in Government".

In March 2021 Tebbit was reported by The Times to have said, during a Zoom meeting, that Special Branch had regularly spied on union leaders while he was employment secretary.

In the aftermath of the 1981 riots in Handsworth and Brixton, Tebbit responded to a suggestion by the Young Conservative National chairman, Iain Picton, that rioting was the natural reaction to unemployment:

I grew up in the '30s with an unemployed father. He didn't riot. He got on his bike and looked for work, and he kept looking till he found it.

As a result, Tebbit is often misquoted as having directly told the unemployed to "get on your bike", and he was popularly referred to as "Onyerbike" for some considerable time afterwards.

The former Conservative Prime Minister Harold Macmillan once remarked of Tebbit: "Heard a chap on the radio this morning talking with a cockney accent. They tell me he is one of Her Majesty's ministers". Peter Dorey of Cardiff University wrote that "it was Norman Tebbit ... who was perhaps the public face or voice of Essex man, and articulated his views and prejudices".

=== Second Thatcher ministry ===
The Nuffield study of the 1983 general election found that Tebbit was the second most prominent Conservative on radio and television news broadcasts during the campaign with 81 appearances (after Thatcher's 331 appearances).

In the post-election October 1983 reshuffle, Tebbit was moved from Employment to become Trade and Industry Secretary, replacing Cecil Parkinson, who had resigned. Thatcher had actually wanted Tebbit to become Home Secretary, but William Whitelaw vetoed this.

In 1984 Tebbit was badly injured, with multiple injuries, in the bombing of the Grand Hotel in Brighton, where he was staying during the Conservative Party Conference, by the Provisional Irish Republican Army. His wife, Margaret, was permanently disabled.

In 1985, Tebbit was appointed Chairman of the Conservative Party and Chancellor of the Duchy of Lancaster, as Thatcher wanted to keep him in the Cabinet. During the Westland affair Tebbit was against the Sikorsky Aircraft Corporation taking over Westland Aircraft. Tebbit opposed the 1986 United States bombing of Libya from British bases and objected to Thatcher's refusal to consult the Cabinet fully on the matter. However, he did criticise the BBC for its supposedly biased reporting of the raid. During the same year, he disbanded the Federation of Conservative Students for publishing an article, penned by Harry Phibbs, following Nikolai Tolstoy's accusation that former Conservative Prime Minister Harold Macmillan was complicit in the forced repatriation of Cossacks in the aftermath of the Second World War.

On 13 April 1986, Tebbit and his chief of staff Michael Dobbs visited Thatcher at Chequers to present her with the results of polling by Saatchi & Saatchi which found that with inflation down and the trade unions weakened, "the Prime Minister's combative virtues were being received as vices: her determination was perceived as stubbornness, her single-mindedness as inflexibility, and her strong will as an inability to listen". Tebbit and Dobbs told her this was becoming known as the "TBW factor": TBW standing for "That Bloody Woman". They recommended Thatcher take a lower profile in the forthcoming general election.

A few weeks later, Tebbit gave an interview to John Mortimer for The Spectator where he said of Thatcher:

It's a question of her leadership when our aims aren't clearly defined. When people understand what she's doing there's a good deal of admiration for her energy and resolution and persistence, even from those people who don't agree with her. Now there's a perception that we don't know where we're going so those same qualities don't seem so attractive.

Thatcher disagreed and her biographer claims she was suspicious of Tebbit's motives. Furthermore, Thatcher commissioned the firm Young and Rubicam to carry out their own polling, which concluded that Thatcher's leadership was not the problem. Throughout the rest of 1986 and into the 1987 election, Thatcher continued to use Young and Rubicam, which eventually caused tensions with Tebbit during the election campaign.

For quite a while, Tebbit was seen as Thatcher's natural successor as Party leader. During early 1986, when Thatcher's popularity declined in the polls, commentators began to suggest that the succession of the Conservative leadership would lie between Michael Heseltine and Tebbit.

At the 1986 Conservative Party Conference in Bournemouth, Tebbit—along with Saatchi and Saatchi, Dobbs and the Conservatives' Director of Research, Robin Harris—came up with the next party slogan—'The Next Move Forward'. For the first time, the Conservatives employed pre-conference advertising to publicise the new-style conference. Tebbit persuaded Thatcher that ministers would state their objectives that they would achieve in the next three years; Saatchi & Saatchi would use these to design posters, leaflets, and brochures to be deployed as each minister finished their speech. The aim "was that in 1986 the media should reflect the image I wanted—of a Government confident, united, clear in where it was going—and determined to get there". According to Tebbit the conference "was more successful than I had dared to hope ... the opinion polls which had us 7% behind in June and still 5% down in September now put us back into first place—a position we never relinquished from then right through the election campaign. The Prime Minister's ratings were immediately restored".

A MORI opinion poll in March 1987 saw Tebbit as second-favourite amongst voters as Thatcher's successor (Heseltine: 24% vs Tebbit: 15%); however, amongst Conservative voters, Tebbit was the front-runner with (Heseltine: 14% vs Tebbit: 21%). In October 1988, MORI asked the same question, with similar results (Heseltine: 22% vs Tebbit: 15%) and (Heseltine: 20% vs Tebbit: 26%) amongst Conservative voters. However, Thatcher apparently once told Rupert Murdoch: "I couldn't get him elected as leader of the Tory party even if I wanted – nor would the country elect him if he was".

On 6 January 1987, the journalist Hugo Young published a quote attributed to Tebbit in The Guardian newspaper. Tebbit's chief of staff, Michael Dobbs, responded by writing a letter to the newspaper citing Young's dislike of Tebbit, adding "Perhaps this explains the invention of the quotation he [Mr Young] attributed to Mr Tebbit". The quote was "No-one with a conscience votes Conservative". Before this letter was published, however, the words "the invention of" had been removed. Despite publishing this letter The Guardian subsequently repeated the quote, and Young again attributed it to him in a letter to The Spectator. Tebbit feared that if no action was taken against The Guardian the Labour Party would use this quote against the Conservatives in the forthcoming general election. With Thatcher's consent Tebbit threatened the newspaper with legal action if they did not retract the quotation and apologise to Tebbit. The case continued until 1988 when The Guardian apologised, published a retraction and paid £14,000 in libel damages in an out-of-court settlement.

During the 1987 general election, Tebbit and Saatchi & Saatchi spearheaded the Conservative campaign, focusing on the economy and defence. However, when on 'Wobbly Thursday' it was rumoured a Marplan opinion poll showed a 2% Conservative lead, the 'exiles' camp of David Young, Tim Bell and the Young and Rubicam firm advocated a more aggressively anti-Labour message. This was when, according to Young's memoirs, Young got Tebbit by the lapels and shook him, shouting: "Norman, listen to me, we're about to lose this fucking election". In his memoirs, Tebbit defends the Conservative campaign: "We finished exactly as planned on the ground where Labour was weak and we were strong—defence, taxation, and the economy". During the election campaign, however, Tebbit and Thatcher argued. Tebbit had already informed Thatcher at the beginning of the campaign that he would leave the government after the election to care for his wife.

Thatcher said to her friend Woodrow Wyatt on the Sunday after polling day in 1987: "He'll carry the scar of that Brighton bombing all his life. I didn't want him to go. Whenever he is away from her he can't even attend to business properly. He's always ringing up to find out if the nurses are looking after his wife all right". In her memoirs, Thatcher said she "bitterly regretted" losing a like-minded person from the Cabinet.

On 31 July 1987, Tebbit was appointed to the Order of the Companions of Honour.

=== Backbenches ===
As Trade and Industry Secretary, Tebbit had privatised British Telecom in November 1984. He became a director of the company on 3 November 1987; this gave him an additional salary plus shares in the company.

In late 1987 and 1988, Tebbit formed a temporary alliance with Michael Heseltine in campaigning for the abolition of the Inner London Education Authority, which they succeeded in achieving through a backbench amendment.

Tebbit was also prominent in an unsuccessful Conservative backbench rebellion against a Bill to give 50,000 households (around 250,000 people) from Hong Kong British citizenship.

In April 1988, Tebbit caused much controversy when, in front of an audience of South African dignitaries, he accused critics of South African apartheid of cowardice and "stinking hypocrisy". He said that, although black critics attacked apartheid in South Africa, they did not speak out against violence among black tribes in South Africa. Archbishop Desmond Tutu was visiting London at the time and called on Thatcher to repudiate the remarks; instead, she defended Tebbit.

In April 1990, he proposed the "Cricket test", also known as the "Tebbit Test", when he argued that whether people from ethnic minorities in Britain supported the England cricket team (rather than the team from their country of ancestry) should be considered a barometer—but not the sole indicator—of whether they are truly British: "A large proportion of Britain's Asian population fail to pass the cricket test. Which side do they cheer for? It's an interesting test. Are you still harking back to where you came from or where you are?"

Tebbit told Woodrow Wyatt in 1991 that he did not think certain immigrant communities would assimilate "because some of them insist on sticking to their own culture, like the Muslims in Bradford and so forth, and they are extremely dangerous". In August 2005, after the 7 July 2005 London bombings, which were carried out by three young men of Pakistani descent and one of Jamaican descent, Tebbit claimed vindication for these views.

In a conversation with Woodrow Wyatt on 19 December 1988, Tebbit said he would not go back into politics unless Thatcher "was run over by the proverbial bus and he didn't like the look of the person he thought might get her job and destroy the work they've done". On another occasion (22 February 1990), Tebbit said to Wyatt that he would stand for the Conservative leadership if Thatcher suddenly resigned; but when Alec Douglas-Home suggested that Thatcher would not stand at the next election because she must be tired, Tebbit disagreed: "She has got amazing stamina".

Following Geoffrey Howe's resignation from the government in November 1990, Thatcher asked Tebbit to return to the Cabinet as Education Secretary, but he refused on the grounds that he was looking after his disabled wife. During the 1990 Conservative leadership election, Tebbit was on Thatcher's campaign team with the job of assessing her support amongst Conservative MPs. According to Thatcher's biographer John Campbell, Tebbit was "her most visible cheerleader ... who characteristically took the fight to Heseltine by holding a cheeky press conference on his Belgravia doorstep". After the first ballot but before the results became known, Tebbit wanted Thatcher to make a clear commitment to fight the second ballot if her vote fell short of the amount needed to win outright. When Tebbit saw Thatcher on 21 November he told her she was the candidate with the best chance of beating Heseltine. However, Thatcher withdrew from the contest the next day. Tebbit wanted to stand, but never did. Tebbit subsequently switched his support to John Major.

After Major came back from Maastricht with an opt-out from the Social Chapter and the single currency, Tebbit was one of the few MPs in the debate on 18 December 1991 to criticise the new powers the Community would acquire. He said the government had been on the defensive against "federalist follies" and that Maastricht had seen "a series of bridgeheads into our constitution, into the powers of this House, and into the lives of individuals and businesses".

== After leaving the House of Commons ==
Tebbit decided not to stand in the 1992 election, to devote more time to caring for his disabled wife. Following the election he was granted a life peerage and entered the House of Lords, having been created Baron Tebbit, of Chingford in the London Borough of Waltham Forest, on 6 July 1992. His former seat of Chingford was aggregated in 1997 with Woodford Green in boundary changes and was held for the Conservative Party by his successor and protégé Iain Duncan Smith. Tebbit famously said: "If you think I'm right-wing, you should meet this guy".

=== Maastricht Treaty and Europe ===
On 11 August 1992, Woodrow Wyatt noted in his diary: "[Thatcher] also seems to have formed a new alliance with Tebbit who stirs her up and talks a lot of nonsense [about the Treaty]."

At the October 1992 Conservative Party Conference in Brighton, Tebbit embarrassed John Major's government when he made a speech attacking the Treaty. As he walked up onto the podium he was applauded by some sections of the audience, described as "young, in t-shirts, aggressively self-confident – the lager louts of our party" in the diary of the Conservative Party chairman of the time, Norman Fowler. Tebbit held aloft a copy of the Treaty and asked the conference a series of questions about the Treaty: did they want to see a single currency or be citizens of a European Union? The audience shouted back "No!" after each question. Tebbit received a tumultuous standing ovation and walked into the centre of the conference hall waving amongst the cheers. Gyles Brandreth, a Conservative whip, wrote in his diary:

The talk of the town is Norman Tebbit's vulgar grand-standing barn-storming performance on Europe. He savaged Maastricht, poured scorn on monetary union, patronised the PM ... and brought the conference (or a good part of it) to its feet roaring for more. He stood there, arms aloft, acknowledging the ovation, Norman the conqueror.

In his memoirs, Major accused Tebbit of hypocrisy and disloyalty because Tebbit had encouraged Conservative MPs to vote for the Single European Act in 1986 but was now campaigning for Maastricht's rejection.

In March 2007, Tebbit became patron of the cross-party Better Off Out campaign, which advocated British withdrawal from the EU. Tebbit issued a statement explaining his support:

From being a supporter of British membership of the Common Market in 1970 I have come to believe that the United Kingdom would be Better Off Out of the developing European Republic of the 21st century. We British have a thousand year history of self-government. We have been free and democratic longer than any other nation. The European Union is too diverse, too bureaucratic, too corporatist and too centralist to be a functioning democracy. We are happy to trade with our European friends and the rest of the world – but we would prefer to govern ourselves.

=== Involvement with the Conservative Party after 1992 ===
Tebbit privately said of John Major on 17 November 1994: "He has the mulishness of a weak man with stupidity". When asked what would it take for him to support Major, Tebbit responded: "Have an entirely new department, the sole job of which would be to deal with the Brussels machinery in every aspect. I agree that we don't want to leave the EU, but we've got to manipulate it and block every single advance we don't like. No, no, no must be his weapon. Veto everything he disapproves of or that we disapprove of".

In 1995, Tebbit publicly backed John Redwood's bid for the Conservative Party leadership, praising his "brains, courage and humour".

In an interview for the New Statesman magazine in June 2000, Tebbit praised Hague's right-ward shift and said that he had "never been a [Michael] Portillo fan". He also mused on not standing for the Conservative leadership after Thatcher's resignation: "When I look at what happened to the party, I tell myself that perhaps I failed in a duty. I suppose I am one of those who have it on my conscience that I allowed Mr Blair to become Prime Minister". When asked if he regretted also allowing Major to become Prime Minister, Tebbit responded:

I helped him. If I'd opposed him, he wouldn't have been on the radar screen. I'd have been opposing Michael Heseltine. I had to make the decision quickly. I didn't want to go back on my word to my wife that I'd retired from front-line politics. How would it all work? Was No 10 suitable for someone in a wheelchair? All these things go through one's mind. Then if Michael had won ... he would have had to ask me to join his government, and I didn't want that. I asked myself: why am I risking all this? And I made my decision ... I might have been an absolute disaster in the job. It's possible. So I am left there. You can't rewrite it. You can't rerun it.

In August 2002, Tebbit called on the then leader of the Conservatives, Iain Duncan Smith, to "clear out" Conservative Central Office of "squabbling children" who were involved with infighting within the Party. He named Mark MacGregor, a former leader of the Federation of Conservative Students which Tebbit disbanded for "loony Right libertarian politics", as one of them. Then, in October the same year, Tebbit accused a group of Conservative "modernisers" called "The Movement" of trying to get him expelled from the Party. Tebbit said that The Movement consisted of a "loose" grouping of thirteen members who had previously supported Kenneth Clarke and Michael Portillo for Party leader. Duncan Smith subsequently denied that Tebbit would ever be expelled and Thatcher publicly said she was "appalled" at attempts to have Tebbit expelled and telephoned him to say that she was "four square behind him".

In February 2003, Tebbit gave a speech to an audience of the Chartered Institute of Journalists at London's Reform Club in Pall Mall, urging journalists to reject political correctness in favour of "open, honest and vigorous debate". He blamed "timid" politicians, including members of his own party, for allowing PC language and ideas to take hold in Britain by default.

Tebbit backed David Davis for Party leader during the 2005 Conservative leadership election.

On 30 January 2006, he accused the Conservative Party of abandoning the party's true supporters on the Right, and opposed the new Leader David Cameron's attempts "to reposition the party on the 'Left of the middle ground'".

In an interview with The Times in September 2007, Tebbit said the Conservatives lack somebody of the standing of Thatcher, and said that although it did not matter if Cameron's team were educated at Eton, "what a lot of people will suggest is that they don't know how the other half lives. David and his colleagues – the very clever young men they have in Central Office these days – are very intellectually clever, but they have no experience of the world whatsoever. He has spent much of his time in the Conservative Party and as a public relations guy. Well, it's not the experience of most people in the streets. That's the real attack and that's damaging to him, I think".

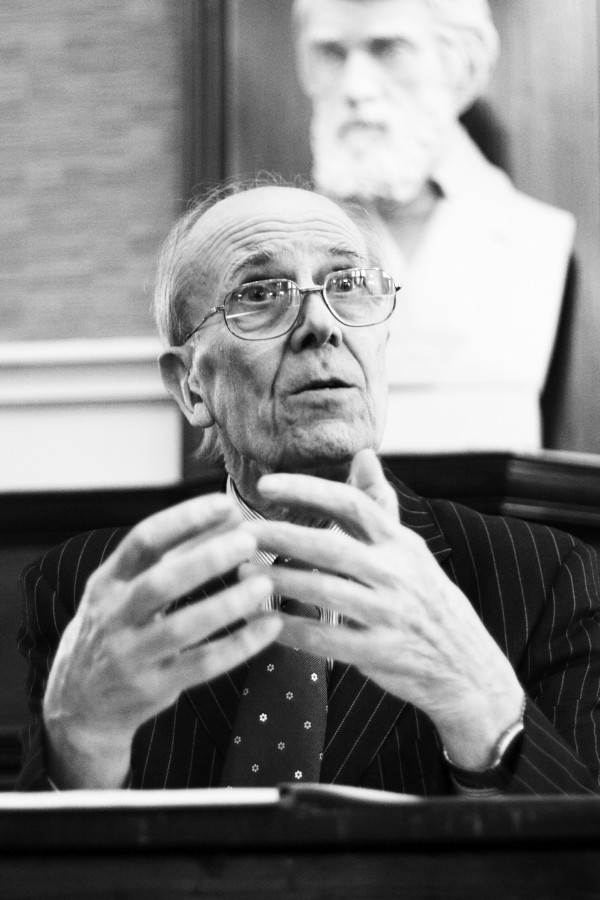
Tebbit giving a talk for the Edinburgh University Politics Society in 2008

In February 2008, after a magazine article written by shadow education secretary Michael Gove, Tebbit publicly criticised what he characterised as "the poisonous tree of Blairism", which he said had been "planted" in the Conservative Party front bench.

Tebbit was the vice-president of the Conservative Way Forward group. He continued his criticism of the Conservative Party's move to a more "centre-right" position by stating that their abandonment of the traditional right vote has created a political vacuum, contributing to the rise of the UK Independence Party (UKIP), including two MP defections, both from the Conservatives.

Tebbit retired from the House of Lords on 31 March 2022, under provision in the House of Lords Reform Act 2014.

=== Other political views ===
==== Overseas aid ====
Speaking in the Lords on 26 November 1996, Lord Tebbit criticised aid to Africa, saying that most aid sent to Africa goes down a "sink of iniquity, corruption and violence" and does little to help the poor. A spokesman for the charity Oxfam said Tebbit's view was "simplistic and unhelpful". Later Lord Tebbit defended his statement that most money went "into the pockets" of politicians "to buy guns for warlords".

==== Homosexuality ====
In a letter to The Daily Telegraph in November 1998, Tebbit said homosexuals should be barred from being Home Secretary. A Conservative Party spokesman said Tebbit was "out of touch" and the official spokesman for William Hague, then Conservative Party leader, said Hague disagreed with Tebbit. In 2013 Tebbit wrote in his Telegraph blog that his views concerning whether a homosexual person could be Home Secretary had changed.

In 2004 he opposed the British Government's Civil Partnership Act 2004. In an interview for The Big Issue in May 2013, Lord Tebbit said that the coalition government's determination to pass the Marriage (Same Sex Couples) Bill had alienated grassroots Tories. He also speculated that it could mean that a lesbian queen could give birth to a future monarch by artificial insemination, and that the legislation might allow him to marry his own son to escape inheritance tax.

In 2018 Tebbit said that he would not attend services at St Edmundsbury Cathedral conducted by new dean Joe Hawes, because of Hawes' civil partnership with another clergyman. Tebbit described Hawes as a "sodomite". Hawes said that he felt "absolutely no ill will" towards Tebbit for his comments and stated: "I have always admired the way in which Lord Tebbit has cared for his wife with such devotion following the Brighton bomb." Subsequently, Hawes and Tebbit became friends, and Tebbit resumed attending services at the cathedral. Hawes presided over the funeral services for both Margaret and Norman Tebbit in 2021 and 2025, respectively. Hawes later described their relationship as "a rather extraordinary friendship".

==== Northern Ireland ====
In October 1999, he spoke out against the plans to abolish the Royal Ulster Constabulary. Tebbit said he was against throwing the Constabulary's name and badge "into the modernisation trash can" and that the RUC had been "the thin green line standing between bloody anarchy and the rule of law". Tebbit also mocked Blair's pledge at the Labour conference to "set people free": "He has set them free. More than 250 terrorists, bombers and extortionists. Kneecappers, kidnappers, arsonists and killers have been set free. But their victims remain imprisoned. Some are imprisoned within broken bodies. Some imprisoned in grief for their loved ones. Some imprisoned by death in their graves".

==== Other parties ====
In an article for The Spectator in May 2001 Tebbit said that retired British security service agents from the Foreign Office had infiltrated James Goldsmith's Referendum Party in the 1990s and then later infiltrated UKIP. Tebbit called for an independent enquiry into the matter.

==== Miners' strike ====
In 2009, Tebbit said he had regrets about the 1984–1985 miners' strike:

Those mining communities had good working class values and a sense of family values. The men did real men's heavy work going down the pit. There were also some very close-knit communities which were able to deal with the few troublesome kids. If they had any problems they would take the kid round the back and give them a good clip round the ear and that would be the end of that. Many of these communities were completely devastated, with people out of work turning to drugs and no real man's work because all the jobs had gone. There is no doubt that this led to a breakdown in these communities with families breaking up and youths going out of control. The scale of the closures went too far. The damage done to those communities was enormous as a result of the strike.

==== Immigration ====
In June 2014, in response to an alleged Islamist plot to infiltrate schools in Birmingham, Tebbit wrote in The Daily Telegraph, "No one should have been surprised at what was going on in schools in Birmingham. It is precisely what I was talking about over 20 years ago and Enoch Powell was warning against long before that. We have imported far too many immigrants who have come here not to live in our society, but to replicate here the society of their homelands."

==== "Foreigners" speech ====
In 2017, Lord Tebbit criticised a Lords amendment to the Brexit bill which would guarantee the rights of EU citizens to live and work within the UK after Brexit. He also criticised the Lords for "thinking of nothing but the rights of foreigners" and "[looking] after the foreigners and not the British", as Theresa May had hoped to leave this amendment out of the bill to secure the rights of British citizens living in EU countries post-Brexit. His comments produced "loud gasps" from the majority of peers (but gained audible support by a number on the Conservative benches), adding that "Of course we don't have the power to look after our citizens overseas, not in these days when we don't have many gunboats".

== Personal life, illness and death ==
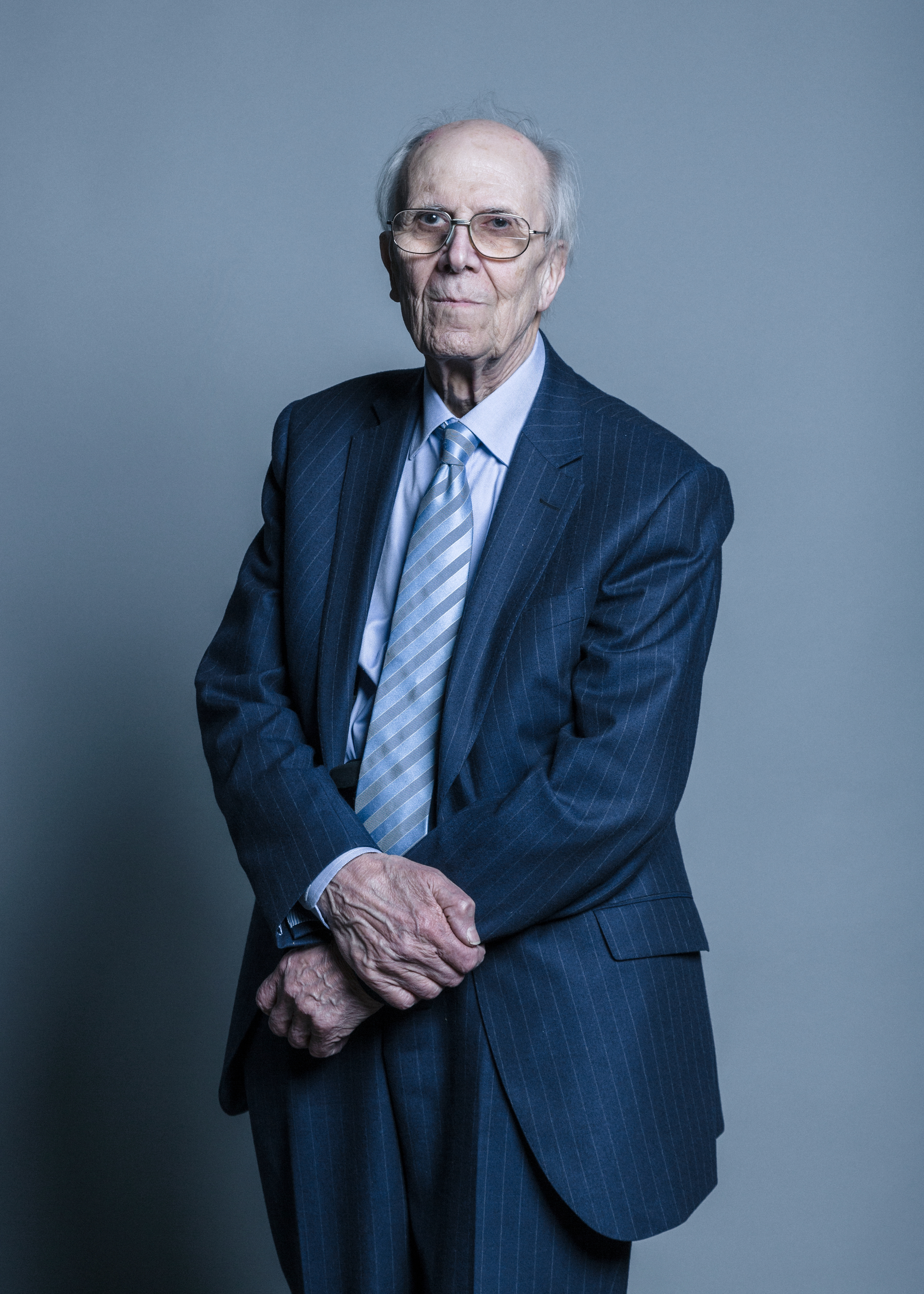
Parliamentary portrait by Chris McAndrew, March 2018

Tebbit lived in Bury St Edmunds, Suffolk, until his death. He was an agnostic. He remarked tongue-in-cheek in a March 2011 interview, when asked whether he thinks God exists, "I'm not sure. He ought to. Things would work better." He married Margaret Daines in 1956. The couple had two sons and a daughter. He was once described as a 'keen amateur chef' and published a book on cooking game.

In December 2013, Tebbit suffered a cardiac incident, praising the NHS for their quick and decisive action. In a May 2014 interview, he talked about discovering he had been suffering from a form of cardiac arrhythmia for more than 40 years: "The suspicion I had a heart problem caused me to puzzle over earlier incidents in my life," he said, reflecting on his RAF jet fighter crash in 1954. "I suspect that, that morning, stressed from the previous day and having had little sleep, I lost consciousness on that take-off run."

Tebbit's wife died at home in Bury St Edmunds, Suffolk, on 19 December 2020, aged 86, after having suffered from depression and dementia with Lewy bodies.

Tebbit died at his home on 7 July 2025, aged 94.

== In the media ==
In the late 1980s, Tebbit was frequently the target for stand-up comedian Ben Elton, who typically referred to him as "Normo Tebbs".

Tebbit was interviewed about the rise of Thatcherism for the 2006 BBC TV documentary series Tory! Tory! Tory!. In 2011, writing in his Telegraph blog, he uncharacteristically praised an article in The Guardian by Michael White. Tebbit cited White's article (an account of Pauline Pearce's visit to the 2011 Tory party conference) as being "a perfect illustration of my theory of the common ground of politics."

Critics nicknamed Tebbit "The Chingford Skinhead". The satirical TV puppet show Spitting Image portrayed him as a sinister, leather-clad bovverboy beating up fellow cabinet members and keeping order in Margaret Thatcher's cabinet. The Professor of English at University College London, John Mullan, has written: "In Spitting Image and probably the middle-class imagination, Norman Tebbit was given an Essex drag on his vowels which he hardly possessed. He should speak in that way because of what he represented".

In May 2009, Tebbit urged voters to snub the main three political parties in the upcoming EU Parliament election. Tebbit, who in March 2009 had said that he would vote for the UK Independence Party (UKIP), stated: "Local elections, the great British public should just treat as normal", but suggested using the European election to send a message to the implicated parties. Tebbit said that there were a series of smaller parties people could vote for in addition to UKIP, including the Green Party, but he urged against voting for the British National Party.

In February 2010, Tebbit apologised following an altercation with a ceremonial Chinese dragon during a Chinese New Year parade in Bury St Edmunds. He is said to have been unaware it was Chinese New Year, stating he heard a "dreadful noise" outside his Suffolk home. Tebbit said: "I put my hands on a Chinese drum to try and stop the noise. I got my knuckles rapped for my pains. I then got jostled by a dragon. I have never been jostled by a dragon before. I gave it a shove, then got on my way." Tebbit later said he had resolved the matter amicably with the parade's organiser.

In July 2013, Tebbit was one of the guests on an episode of Peter Hennessy's BBC Radio 4 programme Reflections in which he talked about his life and career. Earlier that year he paid tribute to Margaret Thatcher, saying he wished there were "someone like her now".

In 2016 Tebbit contributed an interview to the documentary film Bobby Sands: 66 Days.

=== Work in the media ===
Tebbit was a columnist for The Sun, 1995–7; The Mail on Sunday, 1997–2001; and The Daily Telegraph from 2010–2022. Tebbit also wrote for The Guardian and New Statesman.

Tebbit co-presented the weekly discussion and interview programme Target on Sky News between 1989 and 1997 alongside the then-Labour MP Austin Mitchell

== Books ==
- Britain's Future: A Conservative Vision (1985) ISBN 0-85070-743-9
- Britain in the 1990s (1986) ISBN 0-86048-006-2
- Values of Freedom (1986) ISBN 0-85070-748-X
- New Consensus (1988) ISBN 1-871591-00-7
- Upwardly Mobile (Futura, 1991) ISBN 0-297-79427-2
- Unfinished Business (Weidenfeld and Nicolson, 1991) ISBN 0-297-81149-5
- Lindsay Jenkins Disappearing Britain: The EU and the Death of Local Government (Britain in Europe) (2005) ISBN 0-9657812-3-2. (Foreword).
- The Game Cook (2009) ISBN 978-1-906779-11-5

== Bibliography ==
- Campbell, John Margaret Thatcher: The Iron Lady (Jonathan Cape, 2003)
- Watkins, Alan A Conservative Coup. The Fall of Margaret Thatcher (Duckworth, 1992)

== Arms ==
Coat of arms of Norman Tebbit
Crest An enfield Sable the forelegs and talons Or in the dexter forefoot a marguerite Argent seeded slipped and leaved Or. Escutcheon Per pale Sable and Argent three bars counterchanged in the Sable a seax point upwards Or. Supporters Dexter a winged polecat Or the wings addorsed and inverted Sable sinister a winged polecat Sable the wings addorsed and inverted Or both armed Gules. Motto Qui Tacet Consentit Orders Order of the Companions of Honour

Parliament of the United Kingdom
Preceded by Stan Newens	Member of Parliament for Epping; 1970–1974	Constituency abolished
New constituency	Member of Parliament for Chingford; 1974–1992	Succeeded by Iain Duncan Smith
Political offices
Preceded by Jim Prior	Secretary of State for Employment; 1981–1983	Succeeded by Tom King
Preceded by Cecil Parkinson	Secretary of State for Trade and Industry; 1983–1985	Succeeded by Leon Brittan
Preceded by The Earl of Gowrie	Chancellor of the Duchy of Lancaster; 1985–1987	Succeeded by Kenneth Clarke
Party political offices
Preceded by John Gummer	Chairman of the Conservative Party; 1985–1987	Succeeded by Peter Brooke
