= London Central (European Parliament constituency) =

Former European Parliament constituency

- European Parliament constituency
- Boundary within London (1979–1984)
- Member state: United Kingdom
- Created: 1979
- Dissolved: 1999
- MEPs: 1

Prior to its uniform adoption of proportional representation in 1999, the United Kingdom used first-past-the-post for the European elections in England, Scotland and Wales. The European Parliament constituencies used under that system were smaller than the later regional constituencies and only had one Member of the European Parliament each.

The constituency of London Central was one of them.

When it was created in England in 1979, it consisted of the Westminster Parliament constituencies of Chelsea, City of London and Westminster South, Fulham, Hammersmith North, Hampstead, Holborn and St Pancras South, Kensington, Paddington, St Marylebone and St Pancras North.

United Kingdom Parliamentary constituencies were redrawn in 1983 and the European constituencies were altered in 1984 to reflect this. The revised seat comprised the following Westminster constituencies: Chelsea, City of London and Westminster South, Fulham, Hampstead and Highgate, Holborn and St Pancras, Islington North, Islington South and Finsbury, Kensington and Westminster North. The same boundaries were used in 1989 and 1994.

Boundary within South East England (1984–1994)

Boundary within South East England (1994–1999)

== Members of the European Parliament ==
Elected	Member	Party
1979	David Nicolson	Conservative
1984	Stan Newens	Labour
1989	Stan Newens	Labour
1994	Stan Newens	Labour
1999	Constituency abolished: see London	

== Election results ==
European Parliament election, 1979: London Central
Party	Candidate	Votes	%	±%
Conservative	David Nicolson	84,915	54.4	N/A
Labour	Peter J. Gresham	45,721	29.3	N/A
Liberal	Robert Woodthorpe Browne	19,010	12.2	N/A
Ecology	Jonathon Porritt	6,448	4.1	N/A
Majority		39,194	25.1	N/A
Turnout		156,094	30.5	N/A
Conservative win (new seat)				

European Parliament election, 1984: London Central
Party	Candidate	Votes	%	±%
Labour	Stan Newens	77,842	43.2	▲13.9
Conservative	Adam D. Fergusson	64,545	35.8	▼18.6
SDP	Ernest Wistrich	30,269	16.8	▲4.6
Ecology	Jonathon Porritt	5,945	3.3	▼0.8
Campaign for British Justice	R. J. Maynard	1,569	0.9	N/A
Majority		13,297	7.4	▼17.7
Turnout		180,170	33.1	▲2.6
Labour gain from Conservative		Swing	▲16.2	

European Parliament election, 1989: London Central
Party	Candidate	Votes	%	±%
Labour	Stan Newens	78,561	42.2	▼1.0
Conservative	Miss Harriet S. Crawley	67,019	36.0	▲0.1
Green	Miss Niki Kortvelyessy	28,087	15.1	▲11.8
SLD	Miss S. A. Ludford	7,864	4.2	▼12.6
SDP	W. D. E. (Bill) Mallinson	2,957	1.6	N/A
Monster Raving Loony	Screaming Lord Sutch	841	0.5	N/A
Corrective Party	Lindi St Clair	707	0.4	N/A
Humanist	J.S. Swinden	304	0.2	N/A
Majority		11,542	6.2	▼1.2
Turnout		186,340	38.0	▲4.9
Labour hold		Swing	▼0.6	

European Parliament election, 1994: London Central
Party	Candidate	Votes	%	±%
Labour	Stan Newens	75,711	47.4	▲5.2
Conservative	Andrew J. Elliott	50,652	31.7	▼4.3
Liberal Democrats	Sarah Ludford	20,176	12.6	▲8.4
Green	Niki Kortvelyessy	7,043	4.4	▼10.7
UKIP	Hugh F. Le Fanu	4,157	2.6	N/A
Socialist (GB)	Clifford M. Slapper	1,593	1.0	N/A
Natural Law	Susan J. Hamza	1,215	0.8	N/A
Rainbow Dream Ticket	Rainbow George Weiss	547	0.3	N/A
Majority		25,059	15.7	▲9.5
Turnout		159,879	32.6	▼5.4
Labour hold		Swing	▲4.7	
