= Michael Dobbs =

British politician and author (born 1948)

The Right Honourable The Lord Dobbs
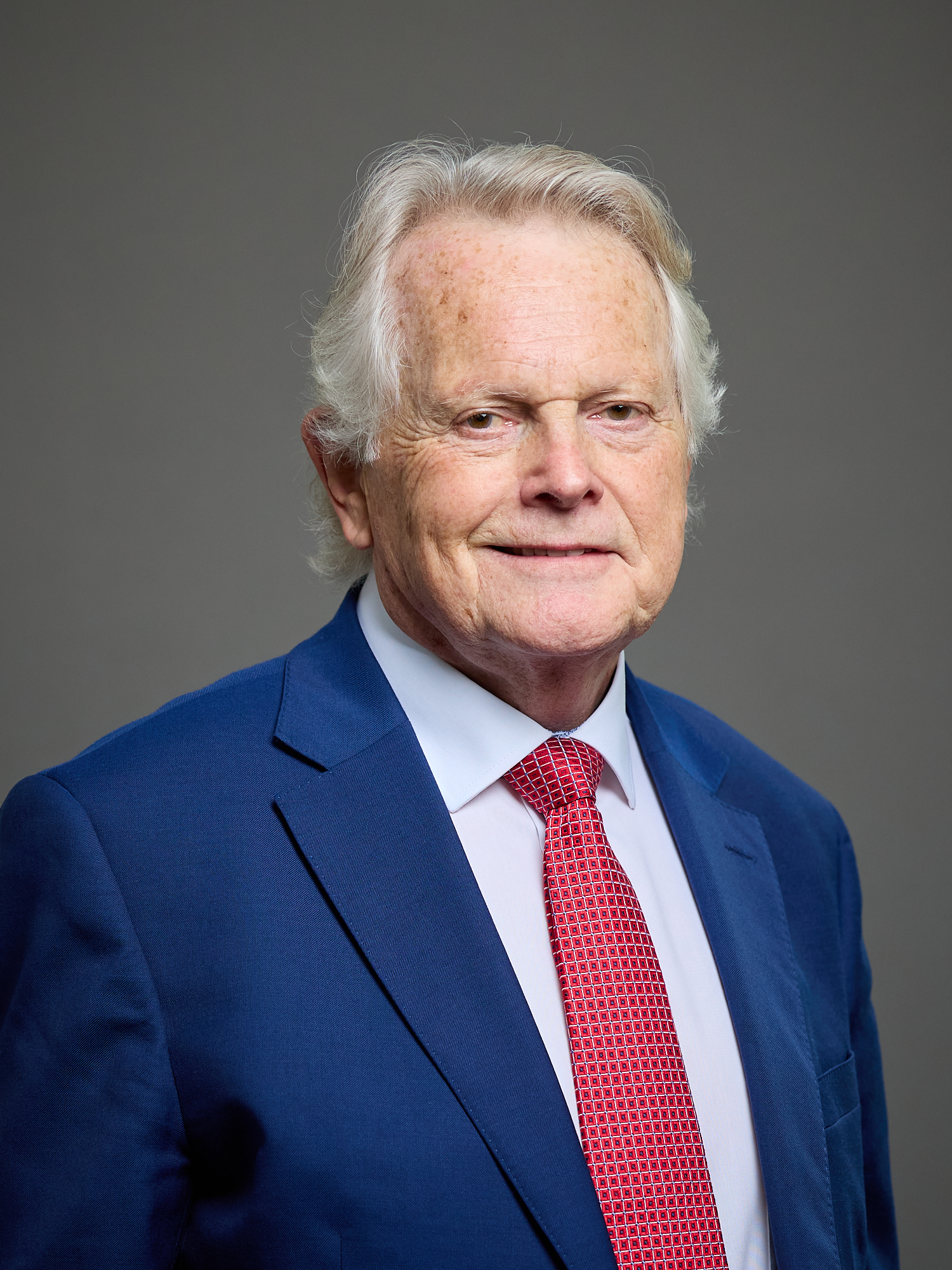
- Official portrait, 2025

Member of the House of Lords
- Lord Temporal
- Life peerage 18 December 2010

Personal details
- Born: 14 November 1948 (age 77) Cheshunt, Hertfordshire, England
- Party: Conservative
- Children: Four
- Education: Christ Church, Oxford (MA); Tufts University (MA, MALD, PhD)

Michael John Dobbs, Baron Dobbs (born 14 November 1948) is a British Conservative politician, media commentator and author, best known for his House of Cards trilogy. He has been a television and radio presenter and a senior corporate executive of Saatchi & Saatchi.

The Guardian called him "Westminster's baby faced hitman." The Mail on Sunday called him "Perhaps the cleverest man in the country". The Sunday Express said he was "a man who, in Latin America, would have been shot". He is the recipient of many public awards and nominations, including being a five-time Emmy Awards nominee.

== Early life and education ==
Michael Dobbs was born on 14 November 1948 in Cheshunt, Hertfordshire, the son of nurseryman Eric and Eileen Dobbs. He was educated at Hertford Grammar School and Christ Church, Oxford.

After graduating from Oxford in 1971 with a third-class BA in philosophy, politics and economics, Dobbs moved to the United States. He attended the Fletcher School of Law and Diplomacy at Tufts University in Medford, Massachusetts, and graduated in 1977 with MA, MALD, and PhD degrees. His doctoral dissertation on nuclear strategic arms control was published as China and SALT: Dragon Hunting in a Multinuclear World. In 2007, Dobbs gave the Alumni Salutation at Fletcher.

He has been a Senior Visiting Professor of International Relations at The Fletcher School, and a Parliamentary Fellow at St Antony's College, Oxford.

== Writing ==
=== Novels and television ===
Michael Dobbs' writing career began in 1989 with the publication of House of Cards, the first in what would become a trilogy of political thrillers with Francis Urquhart as the central character; House of Cards was followed by To Play the King in 1992 and The Final Cut in 1994. In 1990, House of Cards was turned into a BBC television mini-series which received 14 BAFTA nominations and two BAFTA wins and was voted the 84th Best British Show in History. Netflix produced an American version based upon Dobbs's first novel and its BBC adaptation. He was an executive producer of the American series.

His novel Winston's War (2004) was shortlisted for the Channel 4 Political Book of the Year Award, and his Harry Jones novels, A Sentimental Traitor and A Ghost at the Door, for the Paddy Power Political Book of the Year awards in 2013 and 2014, respectively. His novels are also published in the United States, China and many other countries.

In 2024 his novel The Lords' Day (2007) was chosen by Queen Camilla for inclusion in The Queen's Reading Room, where it was described as "An entirely gripping and amazingly authentic thriller about what happens when the State Opening of Parliament really doesn’t go to plan."

In March 2026 Netflix announced that it was starting production on a major television thriller series based on The Lords' Day, starring Damson Idris. Dobbs will be an executive producer.

In 2009 Dobbs' play, Turning Point, about the meeting between Winston Churchill and Soviet spy Guy Burgess was broadcast by Sky Arts TV, starring Matthew Marsh and Benedict Cumberbatch, and won a Broadcasting Press Guild Award.

Anthony Howard of The Times said "Dobbs is following in a respectable tradition. Shakespeare, Walter Scott, even Tolstoy, all used historical events as the framework for their writings. And, unlike some of their distinguished works, Dobbs's novel [Winston's War] is, in fact, astonishingly historically accurate".

Gyles Brandreth in the Sunday Express said "Michael Dobbs does for Westminster skulduggery what Agatha Christie did for the country house murder."

=== Other work ===
Dobbs has been a judge of the Whitbread Book of the Year Award. He presented the Huw Wheldon Memorial Lecture in 2015 for the Royal Television Society and has lectured at dozens of literary and fundraising events around the world.

=== Awards and nominations ===
- Primetime Emmy Awards, Nominee for Outstanding Drama Series (2013, 2014, 2015, 2016, 2017)
- PGA Awards, Nominee for Outstanding Producer of Episodic Television, Drama (2017)
- International Churchill Society’s Blenheim Prize (2017)
- Producers Guild of America Awards, Nominee for The Norman Felton Award for Outstanding Producer of Episodic Television, Drama (2016)
- Online Film and Television Association Award, Nominee for Best Writing in a Drama Series (2014)
- Lifetime Achievement Award for Political Literature, Paddy Power Political Book Awards (2014)
- P T Barnum Award for Excellence in Entertainment (2014)
- Tufts University Alumni Distinguished Achievement Award (2014)
- Paddy Power Political Novel of the Year (2013, 2014)
- Benjamin Franklin Award for best historical novel (2008)
- Shortlisted for C4 Political Novel of the Year (2001)

== Politics ==
After completing his doctorate in 1975, Dobbs returned to England and began working in London for the Conservative Party. From 1977 to 1979, he was a close personal aide to Margaret Thatcher, who was then leader of the Opposition. He was the first person on election night in 1979 to inform Thatcher that she had won. He held many political posts in the ensuing years, many closely linked to Norman Tebbit: 1981 to 1983 special adviser in the Department of Employment; 1984 to 1986 special adviser in the Department of Trade and Industry; 1986 to 1987 Chief of Staff of the Conservative Party; and 1994 to 1995 Deputy Chairman of the Conservative Party.

In 1984, he survived the Brighton bombing at the Conservative Party Conference. He was called "Westminster's baby-faced hit man", by The Guardian in 1987.

On 18 December 2010, Dobbs was made a life peer, as Baron Dobbs, of Wylye, in the County of Wiltshire, and sits in the House of Lords as a Conservative Peer.

In 2013 he co-sponsored, with James Wharton MP, the European Union (Referendum) Bill to hold a national vote on the UK’s membership of the EU. It failed, but shortly thereafter was followed by a government bill that led to the holding of the 2016 United Kingdom European Union membership referendum, which voted in favour of leaving the EU.

In August 2014, Lord Dobbs was one of 200 public figures who were signatories to a letter to The Guardian opposing Scottish independence in the run-up to September's referendum on that issue.

In March 2019, he criticised the Conservative government, stating that "[w]e have a flat-pack Cabinet that threatens to collapse every time you switch the telly on."

On October 14, 2019 he helped formally introduce the debate on The Queen's Speech in the House of Lords, in which he stated "I am an optimist – I have to be. I have four kids and am a grandfather and a Tory Back-Bencher. All roles for which survival requires endless doses of optimism".

In 2019 during the state visit of President Xi Jinping of China, he presented Xi with a copy of House of Cards bearing the inscription: "Where we agree, let us rejoice. Where we do not agree, let us discuss. Where we cannot agree, let us do so as respected friends".

On November 5, 2023, the then-Foreign Secretary and former Prime Minister, David Cameron, said of Dobbs, “I well remember sending him here (The House of Lords), because a week later we lost a vote by one, and he was the responsible noble Lord. I remember having some words with him after that – although, clearly, it had absolutely no effect.”

Dobbs is a member of the advisory board of the Parthenon Project, an organisation that aims "to reunify the Parthenon Sculptures (also known as the Elgin Marbles) currently on permanent display in the British Museum with the other remaining originals in their home city of Athens" in Greece. In the House of Lords he said “the debate about the Elgin Marbles is really like grumpy old men talking about teenage sex, and merely the grubby bits. It misses the point. We are talking about building relationships, about creating something that is bigger and better, it’s called soft power.”

== Business and media ==
Dobbs held various positions at Saatchi & Saatchi (1979–1990), including Deputy Chairman and Director of Worldwide Corporate Communications. He has written for many newspapers, including The Boston Globe (1972–1975) and he was a columnist for The Mail on Sunday (1991–1998).

He hosted the current affairs programme Despatch Box on BBC Two (1998–2001).

He has been a regular contributor to BBC Radio 4. He has written and presented documentaries about the school days of Winston Churchill and Margaret Thatcher, The Archers radio drama series and the Brighton Bomb. In 2023 he was guest editor of Today, devoting the programme to an interview with Camilla, Duchess of Cornwall, and prostate cancer. In December 2024 he presented a three-part satirical review of the year on Broadcasting House in the voice of Larry, the Downing Street Cat.

== Personal life ==
Dobbs divides his time between London and Wiltshire. He has two sons from his first marriage and two stepsons with his second wife, Rachel.

== Charitable work ==
Dobbs has been involved with many charities. In 2015 he walked 185 miles from his home in Wiltshire to the Richard Hale School in Hertford, where he had been a pupil, to raise money for a neighbour paralysed as a result of a rugby accident. In 2018 he walked 130 miles around the Isle of Man to raise money for the local hospice. He has been the patron of the Layton Rahmatulla Benevolent Trust, an eye charity that has treated more than 50 million patients in Pakistan. He has been the president of his local branch of the Royal British Legion. He is active in promoting better treatment of prostate cancer. He is on the advisory board of the Lake Nona Impact Forum, a health and well-being trust.

== Namesake ==
Dobbs is a distant relative of the American Michael Dobbs, a US non-fiction author with the same name. The two are sometimes confused.

== Bibliography ==
Francis Urquhart novels

- House of Cards (1989)
- To Play the King (HarperCollins, 1992)
- The Final Cut (HarperCollins, 1994)

Tom Goodfellowe novels

- Goodfellowe MP (1997)
- The Buddha of Brewer Street (1997)
- Whispers of Betrayal (2000)

Winston Churchill novels

- Winston's War (2002)
- Never Surrender (2003)
- Churchill's Hour (2004)
- Churchill's Triumph (2005)

Harry Jones thrillers

- The Lords' Day (2007)
- The Edge of Madness (2008)
- The Reluctant Hero (2010)
- Old Enemies (2011)
- A Sentimental Traitor (2012)
- A Ghost at the Door (2013)

Non-series novels

- Wall Games (1990)
- Last Man to Die (1991)
- The Touch of Innocents (1994)
- First Lady (2006)

Orders of precedence in the United Kingdom
Preceded by The Lord Feldman of Elstree	Gentlemen; Baron Dobbs	Followed by The Lord Sharkey
