= Stan Newens =

British politician (1930–2021)

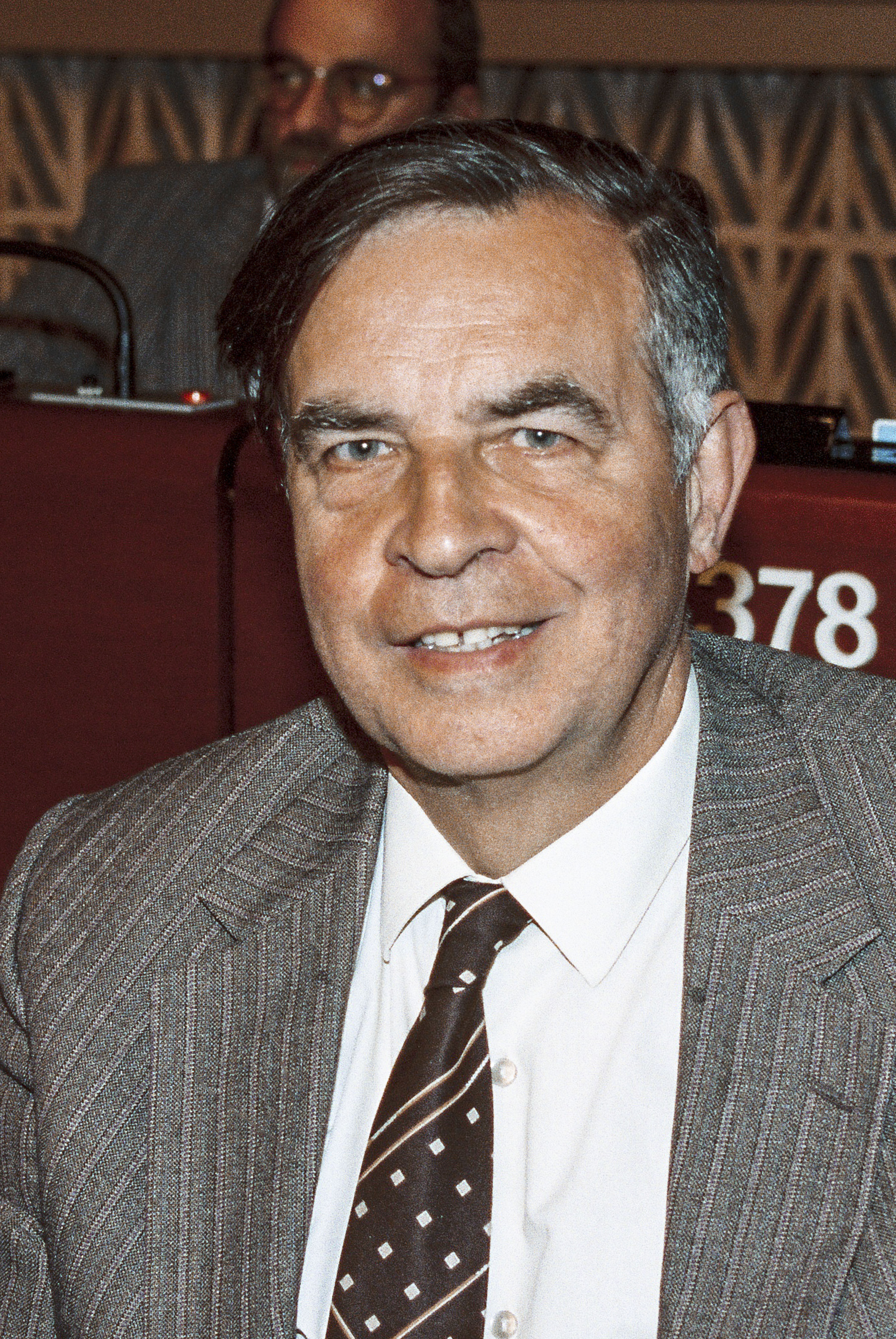
- Newens in 1993

Member of Parliament for Epping
- In office 15 October 1964 – 29 May 1970
- Preceded by: Graeme Finlay
- Succeeded by: Norman Tebbit

Member of Parliament for Harlow
- In office 28 February 1974 – 13 May 1983
- Preceded by: Constituency established
- Succeeded by: Jerry Hayes

Member of the European Parliament for London Central
- In office 1984–1999
- Preceded by: David Nicolson

Personal details
- Born: Arthur Stanley Newens; 4 February 1930 Bethnal Green, London, England
- Died: 2 March 2021 (aged 91) Harlow, Essex, England
- Party: Labour and Co-operative
- Spouses: Ann Sherratt (m. 1954; died 1962); Sandra Firth (m. 1966)
- Children: 5
- Education: Buckhurst Hill County High School; University College London

Arthur Stanley Newens (4 February 1930 – 2 March 2021) was a British Labour Co-operative politician. He was a member of parliament (MP) from 1964 to 1970 and 1974 to 1983, and a Member of the European Parliament (MEP) from 1984 to 1999.

== Early life and education ==
Arthur Stanley Newens was born in Bethnal Green, London, on 4 February 1930, and was brought up in Epping, Essex. He was educated at Buckhurst Hill County High School.

Newens was a conscientious objector during national service and worked as a coalminer in Staffordshire. He graduated in history from University College London, and became a schoolteacher.

== Career ==
In 1949 he joined the Labour Party. At UCL, he met Anil Moonesinghe, a Sri Lankan Trotskyist, who was later to become a Cabinet Minister in Sri Lanka, and joined the Socialist Review Group led by Tony Cliff, a former member of the Revolutionary Communist Party (RCP), which later became the Socialist Workers Party (SWP); he left this group in 1959. He held several posts in the National Union of Teachers and was chairman of the Movement for Colonial Freedom and president of the London Co-operative Society.

Newens subsequently represented two Essex constituencies as a Labour MP. He was elected for Epping in 1964, and lost the seat in 1970. In 1974, he became the first MP for Harlow, but lost the seat in the Conservative landslide of 1983. Following this, he became an MEP for the London Central constituency in 1984, which he served until 1999. He stood for Harlow again in 1987, but was unsuccessful.

He held several senior positions, including vice chair of the PLP Foreign Affairs Group and chair and deputy leader of the Labour Group of MEPs. He was generally seen as a prominent left-winger, campaigning against the Vietnam War and for other international causes.

== Other work ==
Newens was an active trade unionist, and wrote numerous pamphlets and books, including The Case Against Nato (1972), Third World: Change or Chaos (1977), A History of Struggle: 50th Anniversary of Liberation, formerly the Movement for Colonial Freedom (2004) and Nicolae Ceausescu: The Man, His Ideas and His Socialist Achievements (1972). He was also a local historian of Essex and East London; his book "A History of North Weald Bassett and Its People" was published in 1985, and his study of writer Arthur Morrison was published in Loughton in 2008.

His autobiography, In Quest of a Fairer Society: My Life and Politics, was published in November 2013 by The Memoir Club.

== Personal life ==
In 1954, Newens married Ann Sherratt; they had two children before her death in 1962, after suffering a miscarriage. He remarried in 1966, to Sandra Firth, with whom he had three children.

Newens died from heart disease at his home in Harlow on 2 March 2021, at the age of 91.

== Publications ==
- Talking with Nicolae Ceaușescu : an interview with Stan Newens (1982). London : London Co-operative Society Political Committee.
- Nicolae Ceaușescu: the man, his ideas and his socialist achievements (1972). Presented by Stan Newens. Nottingham : Bertrand Russell Peace Foundation.
- The case against N.A.T.O.: the danger of the nuclear alliances (1972). London.
- A history of North Weald Bassett and its people (1985). Stan Newens. North Weald : Nuclear Printing Co.
- Nicolae Ceaușescu: The Man, his ideas, and his Socialist Achievements (1972). Stan Newens. Spokesman Books.
- The memoirs of an old East-Ender Arthur Ernest Newens (1899–1977); edited with an introduction by Stan Newens. (2006). Harlow : A.S. Newens.
- Working together : a short history of the London Co-op Society Political Committee (1988). Stan Newens. London : CRS London Political Committee.
- Arthur Morrison : the novelist of realism in East London and Essex (2008). Stan Newens. Loughton : Alderton.
- The Kurds - a people's struggle for peace and justice (1994). Liberation.
- Leah Manning (1991). Ron Bill and Stan Newens. Harlow : Leah Manning Trust in association with Square One Books.

== Sources ==
- Leigh Rayment's Historical List of MPs

Parliament of the United Kingdom
Preceded by Graeme Finlay	Member of Parliament for Epping; 1964–1970	Succeeded by Norman Tebbit
New constituency	Member of Parliament for Harlow; Feb 1974–1983	Succeeded by Jerry Hayes
