= Never Surrender (novel) =

2004 novel by Michael Dobbs

- Author: Michael Dobbs
- Language: English
- Series: Churchill
- Genre: Historical novel
- Publisher: HarperCollins
- Publication date: 2004
- Publication place: United Kingdom
- Media type: Print (Hardback & Paperback)
- ISBN: 978-0-00-710727-8
- OCLC: 56444836
- Preceded by: Winston's War

Never Surrender is a novel by Michael Dobbs, based on historical events of the first few weeks of May 1940. It is a sequel to Dobbs's novel, Winston's War, which is based on the events surrounding the demise of Neville Chamberlain and the appointment of Winston Churchill as Prime Minister.

“Churchill… is the greatest human being ever to occupy 10 Downing Street”. So concludes Roy Jenkins in his definitive biography of the great wartime leader. Michael Dobbs, the author of this novel, states in an after note, “the world will never know the full debt of gratitude it owes to Winston Spencer Churchill”.

Never Surrender begins with Europe in turmoil. The date is May 10, 1940. Germany has just completed its conquest of Denmark and Norway and has turned its attack to the west by invading France, Belgium, the Netherlands and Luxembourg. The government of the United Kingdom is in chaos. Neville Chamberlain has stepped down or been forced from the Prime Minister's office. And the man nobody really wants, the highly unpopular Winston Churchill, has been chosen to succeed him.

Within days of his taking office, the Low Countries have been overrun and the mighty French army is crumbling to crushing defeat in the face of Germany's blitzkrieg. The governments of France and Belgium are about to capitulate. The British Expeditionary Force, transported to the continent during the months of “Phoney War”, have been cut off from their French allies and are scattered and stranded along the Channel coastline. Pummelled by the German Luftwaffe air superiority and pounded by the Wehrmacht’s Panzers, it faces total annihilation.
