= Margaret Tebbit =

English nurse and wife of Norman Tebbit

The Right Honourable The Lady Tebbit
- Tebbit in 1996
- Born: Margaret Elizabeth Daines; 24 May 1934; Ely, Cambridgeshire, England
- Died: 19 December 2020 (aged 86); Bury St Edmunds, Suffolk, England
- Occupation: Nurse
- Spouse: Norman Tebbit (m. 1956)
- Children: 3

Margaret Elizabeth Tebbit, Baroness Tebbit (née Daines; 24 May 1934 – 19 December 2020) was an English nurse who was paralysed from the chest down by the Provisional IRA's 12 October 1984 bombing of the Grand Brighton Hotel, where she was staying with her husband, Norman Tebbit (then Secretary of State for Trade and Industry), during the Conservative Party Conference. She was disabled for the rest of her life and needed round the clock care.

== Early life ==
Tebbit was born in Ely, Cambridgeshire, to Stan Daines, a tenant farmer and his wife Elsie (née Negus); she had eight siblings. After leaving school aged 16, she became a nurse. In 1955, she met Norman Tebbit at Westminster Hospital, London. They married at Westminster Congregational Chapel in 1956. They had two sons and a daughter. In 1965 and 1974, she was hospitalised with severe post-natal depression. She provided secretarial support to her husband's parliamentary work and later worked as a nurse at St Bartholomew's Hospital, London.

== Brighton hotel bombing (1984) ==
On 12 October 1984, Margaret and Norman Tebbit were among the 31 people who were injured in the Brighton hotel bombing; five people were killed. Margaret Tebbit was more seriously injured than her husband; she had fallen through four floors and remained trapped for several hours. She spent two years in Stoke Mandeville Hospital and the Royal National Orthopaedic Hospital, undergoing treatment in their spinal injuries units. She recovered some use of her hands and arms, but used a wheelchair for the rest of her life.

== Later life and death ==
After heading the Conservatives' successful campaign in the 1987 general election, Norman Tebbit resigned from his ministerial role; he did not stand for re-election in 1992, being created a life peer as Baron Tebbit. He had earlier promised that, to support Margaret Tebbit's continued care, he would leave Parliament and increase the family's income by working in business. In his 1988 autobiography, Upwardly Mobile, he discusses his respect for his wife's strength of character.

Lady Tebbit was vice-president of the spinal-cord injury charity Aspire. She appeared on the BBC Radio programme Desert Island Discs on 31 December 1995, choosing Evert Taube's "Nocturne" (played by Julian Lloyd Webber), Hillier's Dictionary of Plants by Harold Hillier and "an endless team of Man Fridays" as her favourite record, book and luxury item respectively; she compared her experiences of severe post-natal depression with her later physical disability.

Lady Tebbit died at home in Bury St Edmunds, Suffolk, on 19 December 2020, aged 86, having had depression and Lewy body dementia.
