= Amelius Lockwood, 1st Baron Lambourne =

British politician

Lieutenant-Colonel The Honourable The Lord Lambourne GCVO, PC, JP, DL
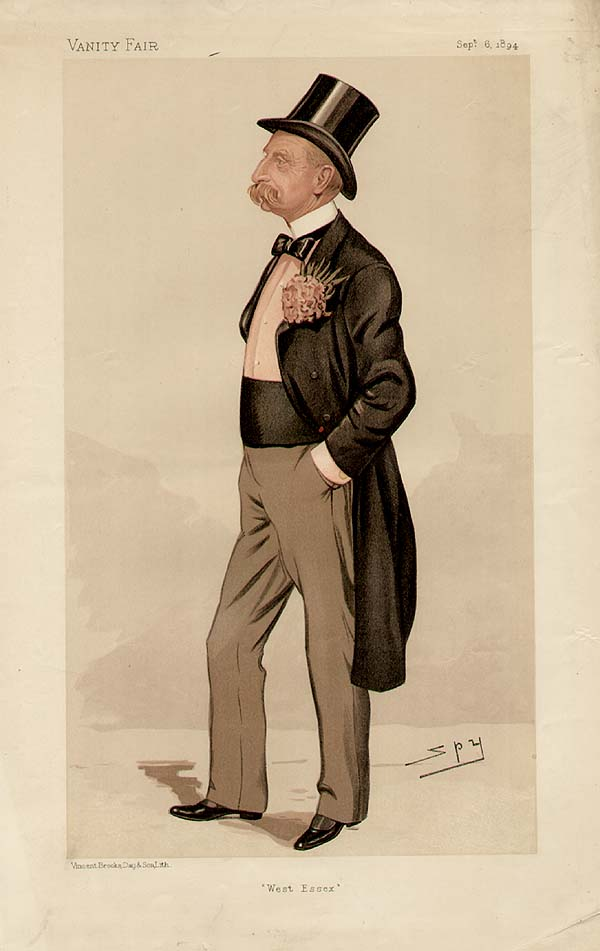
- "West Essex"; Lockwood as caricatured by Spy (Leslie Ward) in Vanity Fair, September 1894

Member of Parliament for Epping
- In office 1892–1917
- Preceded by: Sir Henry Selwin-Ibbetson, Bt
- Succeeded by: Richard Colvin

Personal details
- Born: Amelius Wood; 17 August 1847
- Died: 26 December 1928 (aged 81)
- Resting place: St Mary and All Saints churchyard, Lambourne, England
- Party: Conservative

Lieutenant-Colonel Amelius Richard Mark Lockwood, 1st Baron Lambourne, GCVO, PC, JP, DL (17 August 1847 – 26 December 1928) was a British soldier and politician.

== Background and education ==
Born Amelius Wood, Lockwood was the eldest son of Lieutenant-General William Mark Wood of Bishop's Hall, and Amelia Jane, daughter of Sir Robert Williams, 9th Baronet. He was a descendant of Richard Lockwood, Member of Parliament for Hindon, the City of London and Worcester in the early 18th century, whose father Richard Lockwood had acquired the Lambourne estate in Essex through his marriage to Susanna Cutts. He was educated at Eton. In 1876 he resumed by Royal licence the original family surname of Lockwood (his father having assumed the surname of Wood in 1828 according to the will of his maternal uncle Sir Mark Wood, 2nd Baronet).

== Career ==
Lockwood joined the Coldstream Guards in 1866 but retired from the Army in 1883 with the rank of lieutenant-colonel. He sat as Conservative Member of Parliament for Epping from 1892 until 1917 and was also Provincial Grand Master of the Essex Freemasons from 1902, Vice President of the RSPCA, President of the Royal Horticultural Society and Chairman of the Governors of Chigwell School from 1893 to 1922. He was also a director of the London and North-Western Railway. He was appointed a Privy Counsellor and a CVO in 1905, and raised to the peerage as Baron Lambourne, of Lambourne in the County of Essex, in 1917. On 18 May 1917, he was appointed a deputy lieutenant of Essex, and then served from 1919 until his death as Lord Lieutenant of Essex. In the 1927 Birthday Honours he was appointed a GCVO.

== Family ==
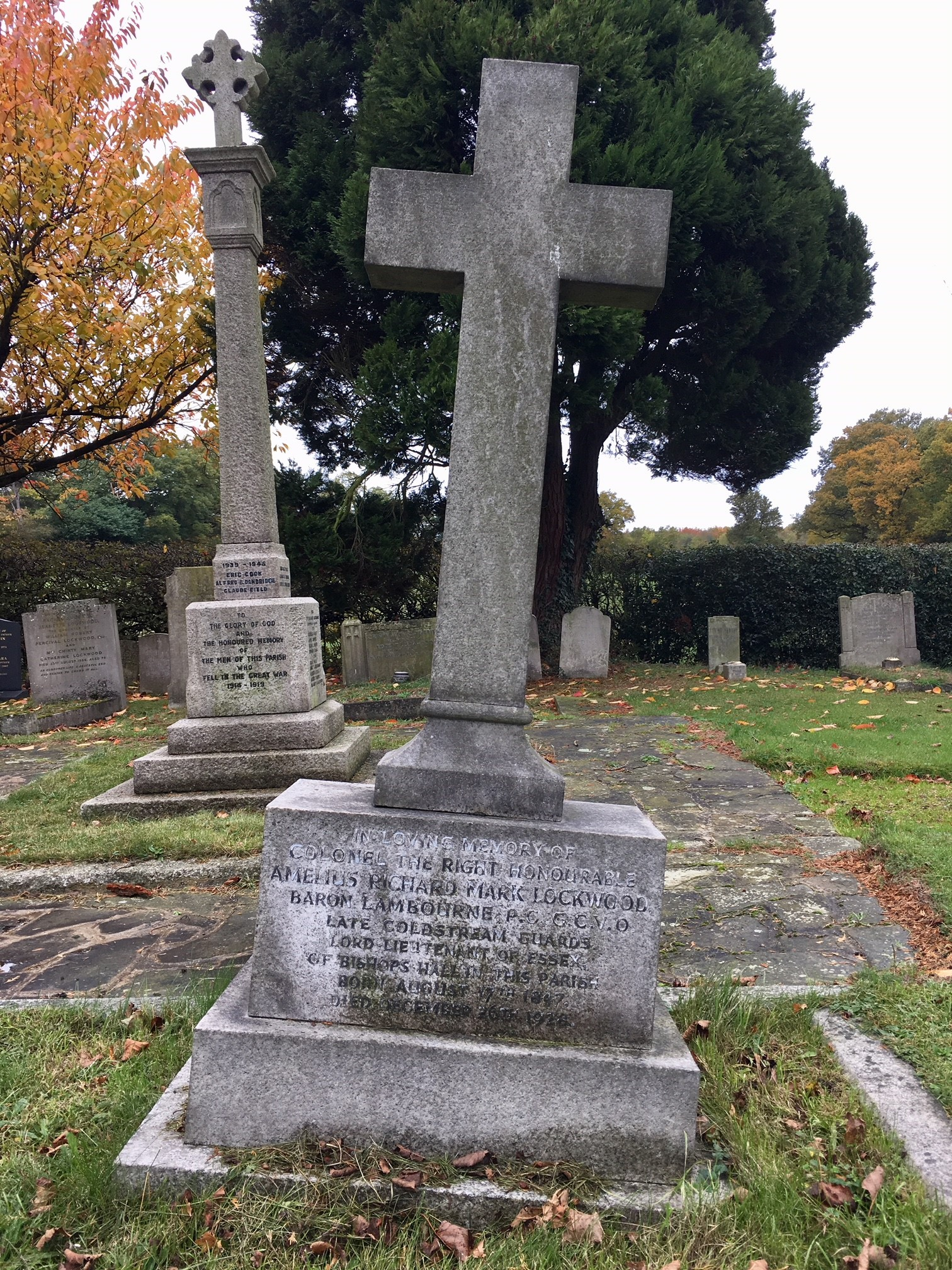
The grave of Amelius Lockwood, 1st Baron Lambourne, in the churchyard of St Mary and All Saints, Lambourne, Essex

Lord Lambourne married Isabella, daughter of Sir John Milbanke, 8th Baronet, in 1876. His nephew and heir, Richard Lockwood, was killed at the First Battle of the Aisne on 14 September 1914. Lady Lambourne died in September 1923. Lord Lambourne survived her by five years and died in December 1928, aged 81, when the barony became extinct. He is buried in the churchyard of St Mary and All Saints in Lambourne, Essex.

Parliament of the United Kingdom
Preceded by Sir Henry Selwin-Ibbetson, Bt	Member of Parliament for Epping; 1892–1917	Succeeded by Richard Colvin
Honorary titles
Preceded by The Earl of Warwick	Lord Lieutenant of Essex; 1919–1928	Succeeded by Richard Colvin
Peerage of the United Kingdom
New creation	Baron Lambourne; 1917–1928	Extinct
