= Epping (constituency) =

Parliamentary constituency in the United Kingdom, 1885–1974

- Former county constituency for the House of Commons
- County: Essex

1885–1974
- Seats: One
- Created from: West Essex
- Replaced by: Chingford, Epping Forest and Harlow
- During its existence contributed to new seat(s) of: Woodford and Chigwell

Epping was a parliamentary constituency represented in the House of Commons of the UK Parliament from 1885 to 1974. It elected one Member of Parliament (MP) by the first past the post system of election.

== History ==
Epping was one of eight single-member divisions of Essex (later classified as county constituencies) created by the Redistribution of Seats Act 1885, replacing the three two member divisions of East, South and West Essex.

The seat underwent a significant loss of territory at the 1945 boundary review, with the majority of the electorate forming the new constituency of Woodford. It was abolished for the February 1974 general election when it was divided between the new seats of Chingford, Epping Forest and Harlow.

Its most prominent MP was Winston Churchill, who served as Prime Minister twice, the local MP for twenty-one years from 1924 to 1945, spanning the middle part of his long service as an MP. From 1945, he was the MP for Woodford.

In the 1955 and 1959 general elections, the celebrated cricket commentator and journalist John Arlott stood as the Liberal Party candidate.

== Boundaries and boundary changes ==
=== 1885–1918 ===
- The Sessional Divisions of Epping, Harlow, and Ongar; and
- Part of the Sessional Division of Dunmow.

Formed from part of the abolished West Division. See below for areas covered.

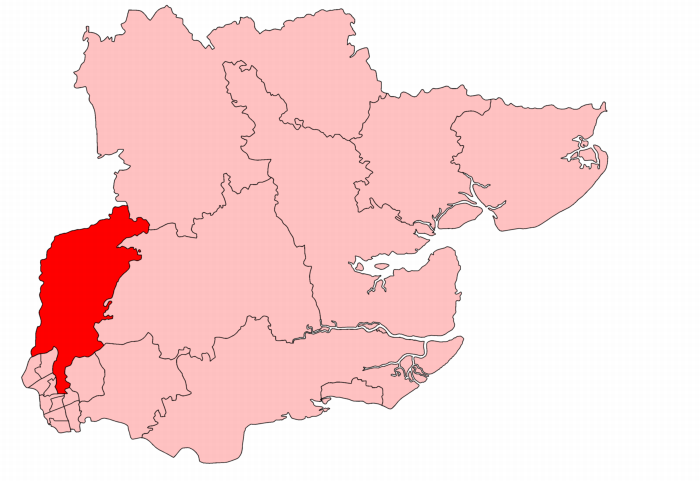
Epping in Essex, boundaries 1918-45

=== 1918–1945 ===
- The Urban Districts of Buckhurst Hill, Chingford, Epping, Loughton, Waltham Holy Cross, Wanstead, and Woodford; and
- The Rural District of Epping.

Gained Woodford from the abolished Walthamstow Division of Essex and Wanstead from the Romford Division. Lost eastern areas, including Chipping Ongar, to Chelmsford, and northern areas, including Great Dunmow and Hatfield Broad Oak, to Saffron Walden.

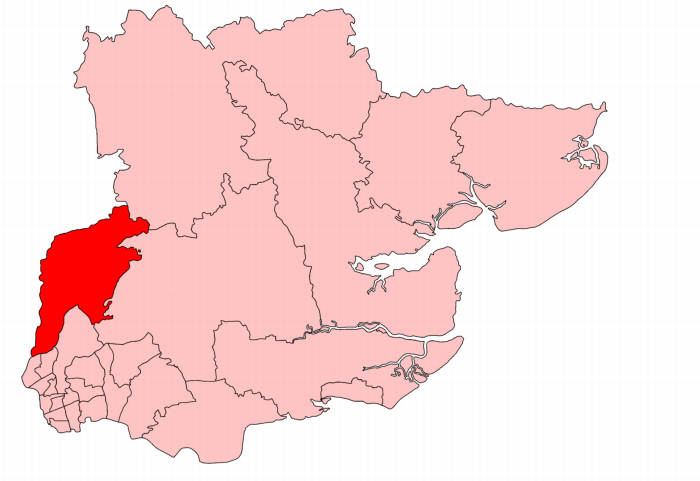
Epping in Essex, boundaries 1945-50

=== 1945–1974 ===
- The Municipal Borough of Chingford;
- The Urban Districts of Epping and Waltham Holy Cross; and
- The Rural District of Epping.

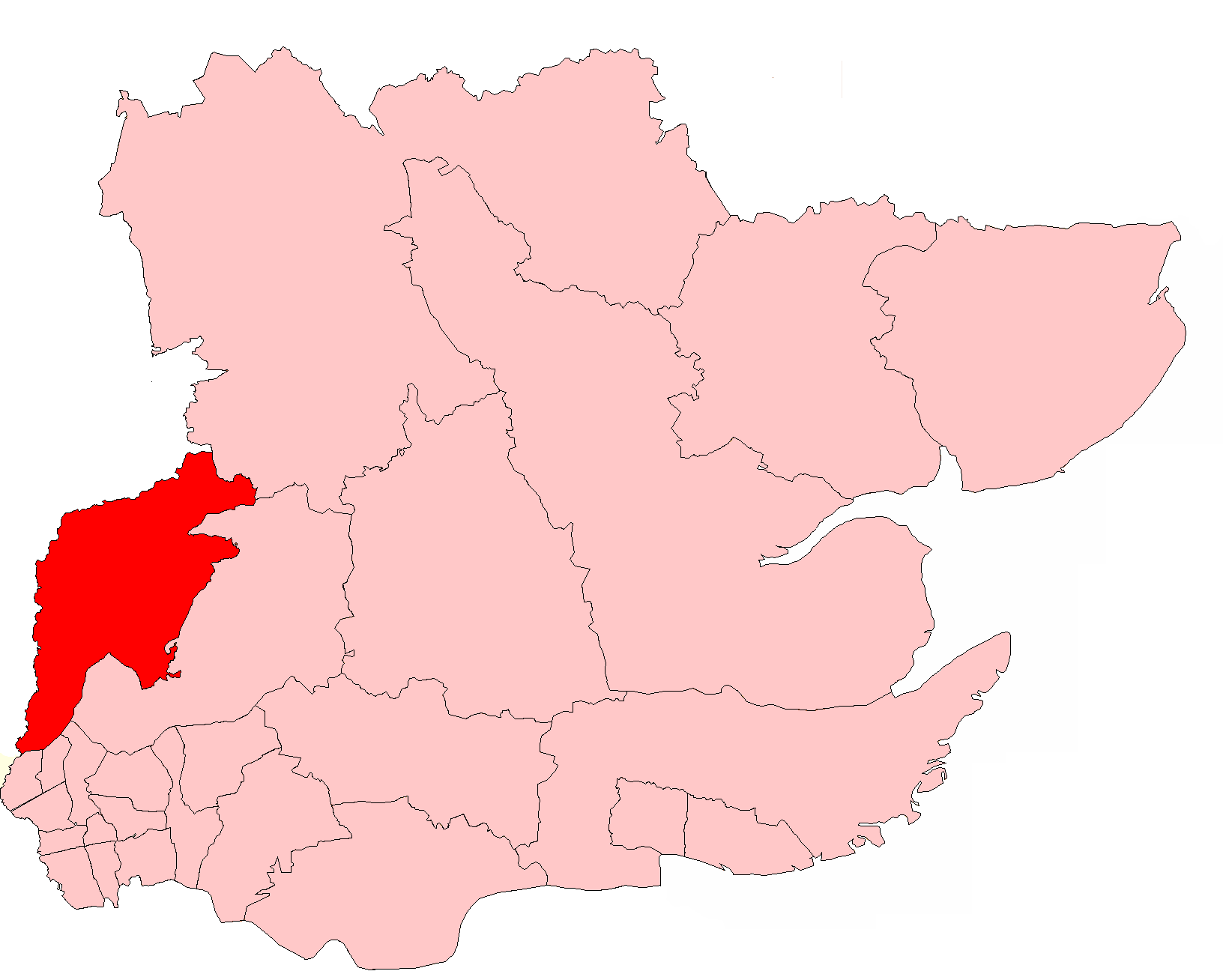
Epping in Essex 1955-74

The House of Commons (Redistribution of Seats) Act 1944 set up Boundaries Commissions to carry out periodic reviews of the distribution of parliamentary constituencies. It also authorised an initial review to subdivide abnormally large constituencies in time for the 1945 election. This was implemented by the Redistribution of Seats Order 1945 under which Epping was divided into two constituencies. As a consequence, the new Parliamentary Borough of Woodford was formed from the Municipal Borough of Wanstead and Woodford (created from amalgamating the two separate Urban Districts) and the Urban District of Chigwell (previously a parish in the Rural District of Epping which had also absorbed the former Urban Districts of Buckhurst Hill and Loughton).

=== Abolition ===
The seat was abolished in 1974 following the Second Periodic Review of Westminster constituencies. The Borough of Chingford had been absorbed into the London Borough of Waltham Forest on its creation within Greater London and now formed the basis for the new constituency of Chingford within that Borough; the Urban District of Harlow, which had been created out of the Rural District of Epping, together with neighbouring parishes (now part of the merged Rural District of Epping and Ongar), formed the new constituency of Harlow; and remaining parts were included in the new constituency of Epping Forest.

=== Areas covered ===
Area	1885	1918	1945	1955	1974
Great Dunmow, Hatfield Broad Oak	Epping	Saffron Walden (part)			
Chipping Ongar	Epping	Chelmsford (part)		Chigwell	Brentwood and Ongar (part)
Harlow	Epping	Epping	Epping	Epping	Harlow
Chingford	Epping	Epping	Epping	Epping	Chingford
Waltham Abbey, Theydon Bois, Epping	Epping	Epping	Epping	Epping	Epping Forest
Loughton, Buckhurst Hill, Chigwell	Epping	Epping	Woodford	Chigwell	Epping Forest
Woodford	Walthamstow (part)	Epping	Woodford	Woodford^{1}	Wanstead and Woodford
Wanstead	Romford (part)	Epping	Woodford	Woodford^{1}	Wanstead and Woodford

^{1}Renamed Wanstead and Woodford, with minor boundary changes, for the 1964 general election (S.I. 1960/454).

== Members of Parliament ==
Year	Member	Party	Notes
1885	Henry Selwin-Ibbetson	Conservative	
1892	Amelius Lockwood	Conservative	
1917 by-election	Richard Colvin	Unionist	
1923	Leonard Lyle	Unionist	
1924	Rt Hon Winston Churchill	Constitutionalist	
1924	Rt Hon Winston Churchill	Conservative	Prime Minister 1940–1945
1945	Leah Manning	Labour	
1950	Nigel Davies	Conservative	
1951	Graeme Finlay	Conservative	
1964	Stan Newens	Labour	
1970	Norman Tebbit	Conservative	
1974	constituency abolished		

== Election results ==
=== Elections in the 1880s ===
General election 1885: Epping
Party	Candidate	Votes	%	±%
Conservative	Henry Selwin-Ibbetson	4,668	61.5	
Liberal	Edmund Barnard	2,915	38.5	
Majority		1,744	23.0	
Turnout		7,574	82.0	
Registered electors		9,239		
Conservative win (new seat)				

General election 1886: Epping
Party	Candidate	Votes	%	±%
Conservative	Henry Selwin-Ibbetson	Unopposed		
Conservative hold				

=== Elections in the 1890s ===
General election 1892: Epping
Party	Candidate	Votes	%	±%
Conservative	Amelius Lockwood	4,536	62.4	N/A
Liberal	Spencer Barclay Heward	2,738	37.6	New
Majority		1,798	24.8	N/A
Turnout		7,274	76.8	N/A
Registered electors		9,476		
Conservative hold		Swing	N/A	

General election 1895: Epping
Party	Candidate	Votes	%	±%
Conservative	Amelius Lockwood	Unopposed		
Conservative hold				

=== Elections in the 1900s ===
General election 1900: Epping
Party	Candidate	Votes	%	±%
Conservative	Amelius Lockwood	Unopposed		
Conservative hold				

General election 1906: Epping
Party	Candidate	Votes	%	±%
Conservative	Amelius Lockwood	5,204	56.4	N/A
Liberal	Spencer Barclay Howard	4,030	43.6	New
Majority		1,174	12.8	N/A
Turnout		9,234	81.2	N/A
Registered electors		11,374		
Conservative hold		Swing	N/A	

=== Elections in the 1910s ===
General election January 1910: Epping
Party	Candidate	Votes	%	±%
Conservative	Amelius Lockwood	6,578	63.1	+6.7
Liberal	Israel Alexander Symmons	3,845	36.9	−6.7
Majority		2,733	26.2	+13.4
Turnout		10,423	85.7	+4.5
Registered electors		12,164		
Conservative hold		Swing	+6.7	

General election December 1910: Epping
Party	Candidate	Votes	%	±%
Conservative	Amelius Lockwood	5,990	64.1	+1.0
Liberal	Israel Alexander Symmons	3,361	35.9	−1.0
Majority		2,629	28.2	+2.0
Turnout		9,351	76.9	−8.8
Registered electors		12,164		
Conservative hold		Swing	+1.0	

Another general election was required to take place before the end of 1915. The political parties had been making preparations for an election to take place and by July 1914, the following candidates had been selected:

- Unionist: Amelius Lockwood
- Liberal:

This election was suspended by the Parliament and Registration Act 1916 (royal assent 27 January 1916), which was extended five times, due to the First World War. A general election was finally allowed in December 1918 after the war was over; but first, Amelius Lockwood was disqualified as an MP by being raised to the peerage in 1917, necessitating a by-election. The Liberals, in wartime coalition with the Conservatives and Unionists, did not oppose the Unionist candidate.

By-election, 1917: Epping
Party	Candidate	Votes	%	±%
Unionist	Richard Colvin	Unopposed		
Unionist hold				

General election 1918: Epping
Party		Candidate	Votes	%	±%
C	Unionist	Richard Colvin	14,668	72.6	+8.5
	Liberal	Arthur Leonard Horner	4,164	20.6	−15.3
	People's Progressive Coalition	J. Conoley	1,367	6.8	New
Majority			10,504	52.0	+23.8
Turnout			20,199	52.4	−24.5
Registered electors			38,519		
	Unionist hold		Swing	+11.9	
C indicates candidate endorsed by the coalition government.

=== Elections in the 1920s ===
General election 1922: Epping
Party	Candidate	Votes	%	±%
Unionist	Richard Colvin	15,300	59.9	−12.7
Liberal	Gilbert Granville Sharp	10,228	40.1	+19.5
Majority		5,072	19.8	−32.8
Turnout		25,528	63.5	+11.1
Registered electors		40,209		
Unionist hold		Swing	−16.1	

General election 1923: Epping
Party	Candidate	Votes	%	±%
Unionist	Leonard Lyle	14,528	52.9	−7.0
Liberal	Gilbert Granville Sharp	12,954	47.1	+7.0
Majority		1,574	5.8	−14.0
Turnout		27,482	66.4	+2.9
Registered electors		41,404		
Unionist hold		Swing	−7.0	

General election 1924: Epping
Party	Candidate	Votes	%	±%
Constitutionalist	Winston Churchill	19,843	58.9	N/A
Liberal	Gilbert Granville Sharp	10,080	29.9	−17.2
Labour	J R McPhie	3,768	11.2	New
Majority		9,763	29.0	N/A
Turnout		33,691	78.3	+11.9
Registered electors		43,055		
Constitutionalist gain from Unionist		Swing		

General election 1929: Epping
Party	Candidate	Votes	%	±%
Unionist	Winston Churchill	23,972	48.5	−10.4
Liberal	Gilbert Granville Sharp	19,005	38.4	+8.5
Labour	Walton Newbold	6,472	13.1	+1.9
Majority		4,967	10.1	−18.9
Turnout		49,449	75.2	−3.1
Registered electors		65,758		
Unionist gain from Constitutionalist		Swing	−9.5	

=== Elections in the 1930s ===
Comyns Carr

General election 1931: Epping
Party	Candidate	Votes	%	±%
Conservative	Winston Churchill	35,956	63.8	+15.3
Liberal	Arthur Comyns Carr	15,670	27.8	−10.6
Labour	James Ranger	4,713	8.4	−4.7
Majority		20,286	36.0	+25.9
Turnout		56,339	77.3	+2.1
Conservative hold		Swing		

General election 1935: Epping
Party	Candidate	Votes	%	±%
Conservative	Winston Churchill	34,849	59.0	−4.8
Liberal	Gilbert Granville Sharp	14,430	24.4	−3.4
Labour	James Ranger	9,758	16.5	+8.1
Majority		20,419	34.6	−1.4
Turnout		59,037	67.7	−9.6
Conservative hold		Swing		

=== Elections in the 1940s ===
A general election was required to take place before the end of 1940. The political parties had been making preparations for an election to take place from 1939 and by the end of this year, the following candidates had been selected:

- Conservative: Winston Churchill
- Labour: Leon MacLaren

The election was suspended by the Prolongation of Parliament Act 1940 (royal assent 6 November 1940), which was extended four times, due to the Second World War.

General election 1945: Epping
Party	Candidate	Votes	%	±%
Labour	Leah Manning	15,993	44.3	+27.7
Conservative	Roy Wise	15,006	41.5	−17.5
Liberal	Sydney Robinson	5,134	14.2	−10.2
Majority		987	2.7	−31.9
Turnout		36,313	71.4	+3.7
Labour gain from Conservative		Swing	+22.6	

=== Elections in the 1950s ===
General election 1950: Epping
Party	Candidate	Votes	%	±%
Conservative	Nigel Davies	24,292	49.1	+7.6
Labour	Leah Manning	20,385	41.2	−3.0
Liberal	Peter Edwin Lewis	4,755	9.6	−4.6
Majority		3,907	7.9	−19.4
Turnout		49,432	86.6	+15.2
Conservative gain from Labour		Swing	+5.3	

General election 1951: Epping
Party	Candidate	Votes	%	±%
Conservative	Graeme Finlay	27,392	54.8	+5.7
Labour	Leah Manning	22,598	45.2	+4.0
Majority		4,794	9.6	+1.7
Turnout		49,990	85.1	−1.5
Conservative hold		Swing	+0.9	

General election 1955: Epping
Party	Candidate	Votes	%	±%
Conservative	Graeme Finlay	26,065	46.4	−8.4
Labour	Leah Manning	22,542	40.2	−5.0
Liberal	John Arlott	7,528	13.4	New
Majority		3,523	6.2	−3.4
Turnout		56,135	82.3	−2.8
Conservative hold		Swing	−1.7	

General election 1959: Epping
Party	Candidate	Votes	%	±%
Conservative	Graeme Finlay	31,507	44.7	−1.7
Labour Co-op	Donald F W Ford	27,114	38.4	−1.8
Liberal	John Arlott	11,913	16.9	+3.5
Majority		4,393	6.2	0.0
Turnout		70,534	84.3	+2.0
Conservative hold		Swing	−0.1	

=== Elections in the 1960s ===
General election 1964: Epping
Party	Candidate	Votes	%	±%
Labour	Stan Newens	34,991	44.4	+6.0
Conservative	Graeme Finlay	31,753	40.3	−4.4
Liberal	Nancy Seear	12,093	15.3	−1.6
Majority		3,238	4.1	N/A
Turnout		78,837	83.3	−1.0
Labour gain from Conservative		Swing	+5.2	

General election 1966: Epping
Party	Candidate	Votes	%	±%
Labour	Stan Newens	38,914	48.4	+4.0
Conservative	E Michael Ogden	31,406	39.0	−1.3
Liberal	Derek A McKie	10,162	12.6	−2.7
Majority		7,508	9.4	+5.3
Turnout		80,482	82.4	−0.9
Labour hold		Swing	+2.7	

=== Elections in the 1970s ===
General election 1970: Epping
Party	Candidate	Votes	%	±%
Conservative	Norman Tebbit	43,615	51.5	+12.5
Labour	Stan Newens	41,040	48.5	+0.1
Majority		2,575	3.0	N/A
Turnout		84,655	73.3	−9.1
Conservative gain from Labour		Swing	+6.2	

== Sources ==
- Leigh Rayment's Historical List of MPs – Constituencies beginning with "E" (part 2)

Parliament of the United Kingdom
Preceded by Essex South	UK Parliament constituency Representative for Wanstead, Woodford; 1885–1945	Succeeded by Woodford
Preceded by Essex South	UK Parliament constituency Representative for Loughton, Buckhurst Hill, Chigwell; 1885–1950	Succeeded by Woodford
Preceded by Essex South	UK Parliament constituency Representative for Chingford; 1885–1974	Succeeded by Chingford
Preceded by Essex South	UK Parliament constituency Representative for Harlow; 1885–1974	Succeeded by Harlow
Preceded by Essex South	UK Parliament constituency Representative for Waltham Abbey, Theydon Bois, Epping; 1885–1974	Succeeded by Epping Forest
Preceded by Colne Valley	Constituency represented by the chancellor of the Exchequer; 1924–1929	Succeeded by Colne Valley
Preceded by Birmingham Edgbaston	Constituency represented by the prime minister 1940–1945	Succeeded by Limehouse
