= Richard Colvin (British Army officer) =

British politician (1856–1936)

Brigadier-General Sir Richard Colvin KCB KStJ TD DL
- Born: Richard Beale Colvin; 4 August 1856
- Died: 17 January 1936 (aged 79)

Brigadier-General Sir Richard Beale Colvin, KCB, KStJ, TD, DL (4 August 1856 – 17 January 1936) was a British Army officer and Conservative Party politician.

== Biography ==
Colvin was the elder son of Beale Blackwell Colvin, of Pishiobury, Hertfordshire. He was educated at Eton and at Trinity College, Cambridge, from where he received a Bachelor of Arts (BA) in 1879.

He served as High Sheriff of Essex in 1890, and was from the same year a major in the Loyal Suffolk Hussars, a Yeomanry regiment based in Bury St Edmunds.

Following the outbreak of the Second Boer War in late 1899, Colvin was on 7 February 1900 appointed Deputy-Assistant Adjutant-General in the Imperial Yeomanry, responsible for corps raised outside the headquarters of the existing yeomanry regiments. With the expansion of the number of Imperial Yeomanry regiments, he was a month later, on 14 March 1900, reassigned and appointed in command of the 20th Battalion, Imperial Yeomanry, with the temporary rank of lieutenant-colonel. He was senior (and thus commanding) officer on board the SS Canada which set out for South Africa in the middle of April 1900 with a large contingent of Imperial Yeomanry soldiers, including the 20th battalion. He was promoted to the substantive rank of lieutenant-colonel on 8 November 1901, and transferred to the Essex Yeomanry on his return home. For his services during the war, he was appointed a Companion (military) of the Order of the Bath (CB) in November 1900. After the end of the war, he received the honorary rank of colonel.

He was later awarded the Companion (civil) of the Order of the Bath (CB) in 1911, and was promoted to a Knight Commander of the Order (KCB).

Colvin was elected as member of parliament (MP) for Epping at an unopposed by-election in 1917, after Epping's Conservative MP Amelius Lockwood was ennobled as Baron Lambourne. He was re-elected in 1918 and 1922, and retired from the House of Commons at the 1923 general election. On 31 January 1929, he was appointed Lord-Lieutenant of Essex, serving as such until 1936.

== Family ==
Covin married, on 26 June 1895, Lady Gwendoline Audrey Adeline Brudenell Rous (1869–1952), daughter of John Rous, 2nd Earl of Stradbroke and Augusta Bonham. They had two children:

- Aubrey Mary Maud Colvin (b. 1896)
- Richard Beale Rous (b. 15 March 1900)

They lived at Monkhams, Waltham Abbey.

His portrait, describing him as a brigadier-general, is held at the National Portrait Gallery.

Parliament of the United Kingdom
| Preceded by Amelius Lockwood | Member of Parliament for Epping; 1917–1923 | Succeeded by Leonard Lyle |
Honorary titles
| Preceded by The Lord Lambourne | Lord Lieutenant of Essex; 1929–1936 | Succeeded by Sir Francis Whitmore, Bt |
