= Bill Rammell =

British Labour politician

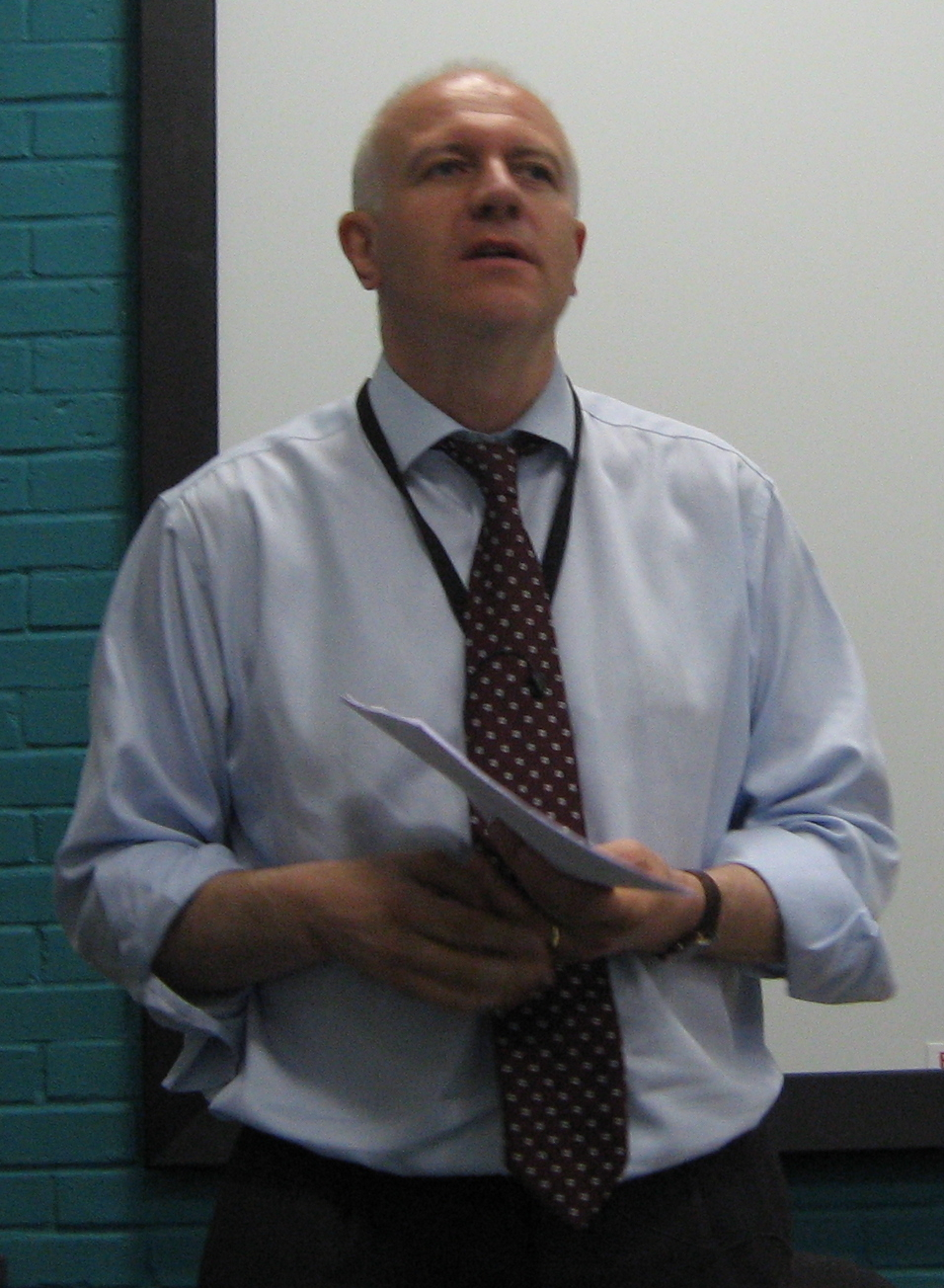
- Rammell in 2008

Vice-Chancellor of the University of Bedfordshire
- In office August 2012 – December 2019
- Chancellor: The Baroness Howells of St Davids; John Bercow
- Preceded by: Les Ebdon
- Succeeded by: Rebecca Bunting

Minister of State for the Armed Forces
- In office 8 June 2009 – 11 May 2010
- Prime Minister: Gordon Brown
- Preceded by: Bob Ainsworth
- Succeeded by: Nick Harvey

Minister of State for Foreign and Commonwealth Affairs
- In office 5 October 2008 – 8 June 2009
- Prime Minister: Gordon Brown
- Preceded by: Kim Howells
- Succeeded by: Ivan Lewis

Minister of State for Higher Education
- In office 11 May 2005 – 5 October 2008
- Prime Minister: Tony Blair; Gordon Brown
- Preceded by: Kim Howells
- Succeeded by: David Lammy

Parliamentary Under-Secretary of State for Foreign and Commonwealth Affairs
- In office 28 October 2002 – 10 May 2005
- Prime Minister: Tony Blair
- Preceded by: Denis MacShane
- Succeeded by: The Lord Triesman

Member of Parliament for Harlow
- In office 1 May 1997 – 12 April 2010
- Preceded by: Jerry Hayes
- Succeeded by: Robert Halfon

Personal details
- Born: 10 October 1959 (age 67) London, England
- Party: Labour
- Education: Cardiff University

William Ernest Rammell (born 10 October 1959) is a former British Labour Party politician, who was the Member of Parliament (MP) for Harlow from 1997 until 2010, and served as a Minister of State in several departments from 2002. From August 2012 to December 2019 he was Vice-Chancellor of the University of Bedfordshire. He was chair of the university consortium MillionPlus from June to December 2019. In August 2021 he became president of the University of Kurdistan Hewler in Iraqi Kurdistan.

== Early life ==
He was born in Camden Town to a Labour-supporting family, who moved to Harlow when he was six. He read French and Politics at University College Cardiff, and became student president. In his year out in France, when teaching, he met his Swedish wife, who was a student.

== Political career ==
He won the Latton Bush council seat in a 1985 by-election, and won again in May 1986. He was chosen as the local Labour parliament candidate in October 1989, when he commuted into London, each day, as general manager of student affairs at King’s College London. Dermot Byrne, father of Liam Byrne, was general manager of Harlow Council, and worked with Rammell. Rammell had worked for Youth Services at Basildon Council.

=== Government ===
Rammell joined Tony Blair's government in October 2002 as an assistant whip but was promoted two weeks later to be a spokesperson for the Foreign and Commonwealth Office. Rammell, a pro-European, was supportive of joining the Euro, and until 2002 he was Chair of Labour Movement for Europe. In September 2004, he was the first British government minister to visit North Korea.

In the 2005 general election, Rammell held his seat with the third smallest majority of any Labour MP, at just 97 votes. The result was not declared until two days after voting, following four recounts.

In May 2005, Rammell was made Minister of State for Higher Education. He was strongly supportive of top-up fees, arguing in 2005 that without such fees it would be necessary to put "3p or 4p on the standard rate of tax". In September 2007, he withdrew funding from some courses teaching English as a second or foreign language.

In February 2008, Rammell announced plans to create a national database of children's school records and exam results which would make up a publicly owned CV. The CV and "Learner Number" would stay with the child throughout adult life until retirement and only the British government would be able to remove records from their database entry. The plan would only have applied to English children, with education being a devolved matter.

In October 2008, Rammell returned to the Foreign Office as Minister of State, and in June 2009, was moved again to the Ministry of Defence as Minister of State for the Armed Forces. He defended the Brown government's levels of spending on equipment in Afghanistan, following a soldier's death because of a lack of available helicopters.

In September 2009, Rammell confirmed he had told Libya that the Prime Minister did not want to see convicted Lockerbie bomber Abdelbaset al-Megrahi, who had been serving a life sentence, die in prison.

In October 2009, following Sir Thomas Legg's audit, Rammell was ordered to repay £2,782 of wrongful expenses claims.

In the 2010 general election, Rammell was defeated in Harlow by Conservative candidate Robert Halfon, who gained the seat with a majority of 4,925 votes.

In August 2012, Rammell was appointed Vice-Chancellor of the University of Bedfordshire. He held the position until 2019. He had previously worked for Plymouth University as Deputy Vice-Chancellor with responsibility for student experience and internationalisation.

== Personal life ==
In the 1990s he lived in The Hides in Harlow. With his Swedish wife he had son Christopher, born in 1989.

Parliament of the United Kingdom
Preceded by Jerry Hayes	Member of Parliament for Harlow; 1997–2010	Succeeded by Robert Halfon
Preceded by Bob Ainsworth	Minister of State for the Armed Forces; 2009–2010	Succeeded by Nick Harvey
Academic offices
Preceded by Les Ebdon	Vice-Chancellor of the University of Bedfordshire; 2012–present	Incumbent
