= John Bercow =

British politician (born 1963)

The Right Honourable John Bercow
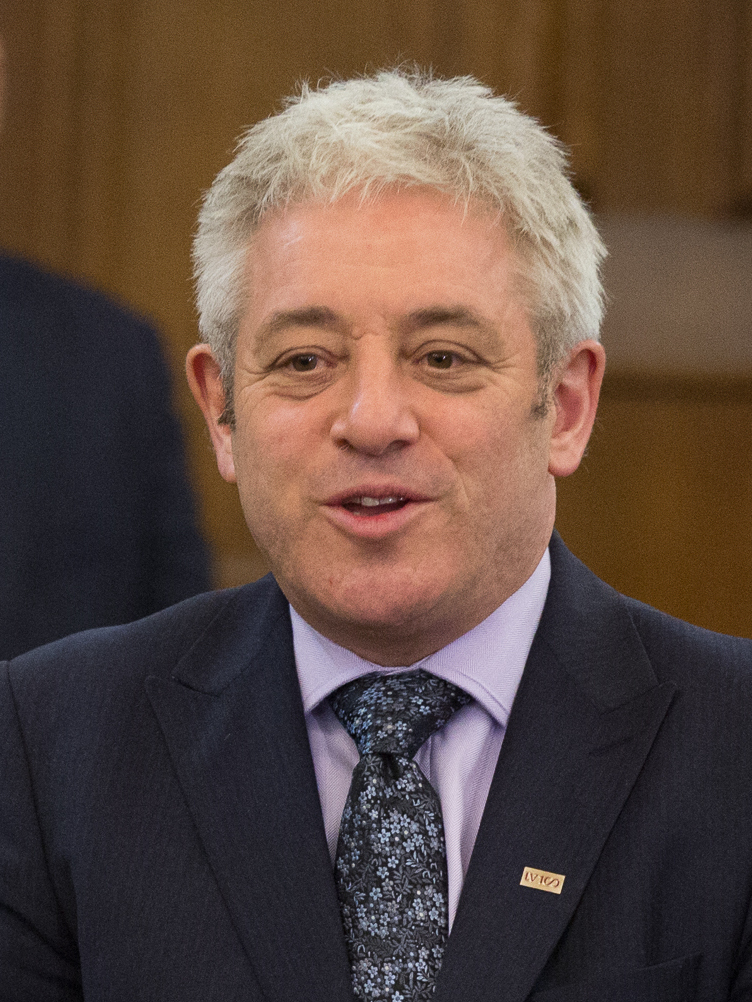
- Bercow in 2018

Speaker of the House of Commons of the United Kingdom
- In office 22 June 2009 – 4 November 2019
- Monarch: Elizabeth II
- Prime Minister: Gordon Brown; David Cameron; Theresa May; Boris Johnson
- Preceded by: Michael Martin
- Succeeded by: Lindsay Hoyle
Shadow Cabinet posts
Shadow Secretary of State for International Development
In office 10 November 2003 – 8 September 2004
Leader	Michael Howard
Preceded by	Caroline Spelman
Succeeded by	Alan Duncan
Shadow Chief Secretary to the Treasury
In office 18 September 2001 – 23 July 2002
Preceded by	Oliver Letwin
Succeeded by	Howard Flight

Member of Parliament for Buckingham
- In office 1 May 1997 – 4 November 2019
- Preceded by: George Walden
- Succeeded by: Greg Smith
- Succeeded by
Additional offices
Chancellor of the University of Essex
In office 22 July 2017 – 12 November 2021
Vice Chancellor	Anthony Forster
Preceded by	Shami Chakrabarti
Succeeded by	Sarah Perry (2023)
Chancellor of the University of Bedfordshire
In office 25 July 2014 – June 2017
Vice Chancellor	Bill Rammell; Rebecca Bunting
Preceded by	The Baroness Howells of St Davids
Succeeded by	Sarfraz Manzoor (2023–)
Member of Lambeth London Borough Council for St Leonard's ward
In office 9 May 1986 – 4 May 1990

Personal details
- Born: John Simon Bercow; 19 January 1963 (age 63) Edgware, Middlesex, England
- Party: Labour (2021–present)
- Other political affiliations: Independent (2019–2021); Speaker (2009–2019); Conservative (1980–2009)
- Spouse: Sally Illman (m. 2002)
- Children: 3
- Education: University of Essex (BA)
- Bercow's voice from the BBC programme Westminster Hour, 10 January 2010

John Simon Bercow (/ˈbɜːrkoʊ/; born 19 January 1963) is a British former politician who served as Speaker of the House of Commons from 2009 to 2019, and the Member of Parliament (MP) for Buckingham between 1997 and 2019. A member of the Conservative Party prior to becoming speaker, he was the first MP since Selwyn Lloyd in 1971 to be elected speaker without having been a deputy speaker. After resigning as speaker in 2019 and opting not to seek re-election as an MP in the 2019 general election, Bercow left Parliament. In 2021, he joined the Labour Party but was suspended in 2022.

Bercow was a councillor in the London Borough of Lambeth from 1986 to 1990 and unsuccessfully contested parliamentary seats in the 1987 and 1992 general elections, before being elected for Buckingham in 1997. Promoted to the Shadow cabinet in 2001, he held posts under Iain Duncan Smith and Michael Howard. In November 2002, Bercow resigned over a dispute concerning his support for the Adoption and Children Act 2002, but returned a year later, only to be dismissed from the Shadow cabinet in 2004. Having initially been strongly associated with the right-wing faction of his party, his views shifted; by 2007, there were rumours that he would defect to the Labour Party.

On the resignation of Michael Martin in June 2009, Bercow stood successfully in the election to replace him as speaker. As speaker, he was obliged to leave the Conservative Party and remain as an independent for the duration of his tenure. He was re-elected unopposed at the commencements of the Parliaments in 2010, 2015 and 2017. This made him the first speaker since the Second World War to have been elected four times, as well as the first since then to have served alongside four prime ministers. In September 2019, Bercow declared that he would stand down as Commons speaker and MP on 31 October; he remained speaker until being appointed to the Manor of Northstead on 4 November 2019.

In 2014, Bercow was appointed Chancellor of the University of Bedfordshire. In July 2017, he was appointed Chancellor of the University of Essex, stepping down from this role in November 2021. In January 2020, he became part-time professor of politics at Royal Holloway, University of London. He was suspended from the Labour Party in 2022 after 21 complaints of him bullying staff were upheld. Since the death of Betty Boothroyd in 2023, he is the only living former Speaker of the House of Commons.

== Early life and education ==
On 19 January 1963, John Bercow was born in Edgware, Middlesex, the son of Brenda (née Bailey) and Charles Bercow, a taxi driver. His father was born to a Romanian-Jewish family and his English-born mother converted to Judaism. His paternal grandparents were Jews who arrived in Britain from Romania in the early 20th century. Having settled in the UK, the family anglicised its surname from Berkowitz to Bercow. Bercow attended Frith Manor Primary School in Woodside Park, and Finchley Manorhill School, a large comprehensive school in North Finchley. In his youth, Bercow was a successful junior tennis player, but was too short to turn professional. In 1975 he appeared on the UK children's television series Crackerjack!.

Bercow graduated with a first-class honours degree in government from the University of Essex in 1985. Anthony King, a professor at the university, has said about Bercow that "When he was a student here, he was very right-wing, pretty stroppy, and very good. He was an outstanding student." As a young activist, Bercow was a member of the right-wing Conservative Monday Club. He stood as a candidate for the club's national executive in 1981 with a manifesto calling for a programme of "assisted repatriation" of immigrants, and became secretary of its immigration and repatriation committee. At the age of 20, he left the club, citing the views of many of the club's members as his reason, and has since then called his participation in the club "utter madness" and dismissed his views from that period as "bone headed".

After graduating from the University of Essex, Bercow was elected as the last national chairman of the Federation of Conservative Students (FCS), 1986–87. The FCS was then broken up by the chairman of the Conservative Party, Norman Tebbit, after one of its members had accused previous Tory PM Harold Macmillan of war crimes in extraditing Cossacks to the Soviet Union. Bercow attracted the attention of the Conservative leadership, and in 1987 he was appointed by Tebbit as vice-chairman of the Conservative Collegiate Forum (the successor organisation of the FCS) to head the campaign for student support in the run-up to the 1987 general election.

Following a spell in merchant banking, Bercow joined the lobbying firm Rowland Sallingbury Casey (part of Saatchi & Saatchi) in 1988, becoming a board director within five years. With fellow Conservative Julian Lewis, Bercow ran an advanced speaking and campaigning course for over 10 years, which trained over 600 Conservatives (including several current MPs) in campaigning and communication techniques. He has also lectured in the United States to students of the Leadership Institute.

== Political career ==
=== Councillor ===
In 1986, Bercow was elected as a Conservative councillor in the London Borough of Lambeth and served for four years representing the Streatham, St Leonard's ward. In 1987, he was appointed the youngest deputy group leader in the United Kingdom.

=== Special adviser ===
In 1995, Bercow was appointed as a special adviser to the Chief Secretary to the Treasury, Jonathan Aitken. Following Aitken's resignation to fight a libel action, Bercow served as a special adviser to the Secretary of State for National Heritage, Virginia Bottomley.

=== Parliamentary career ===
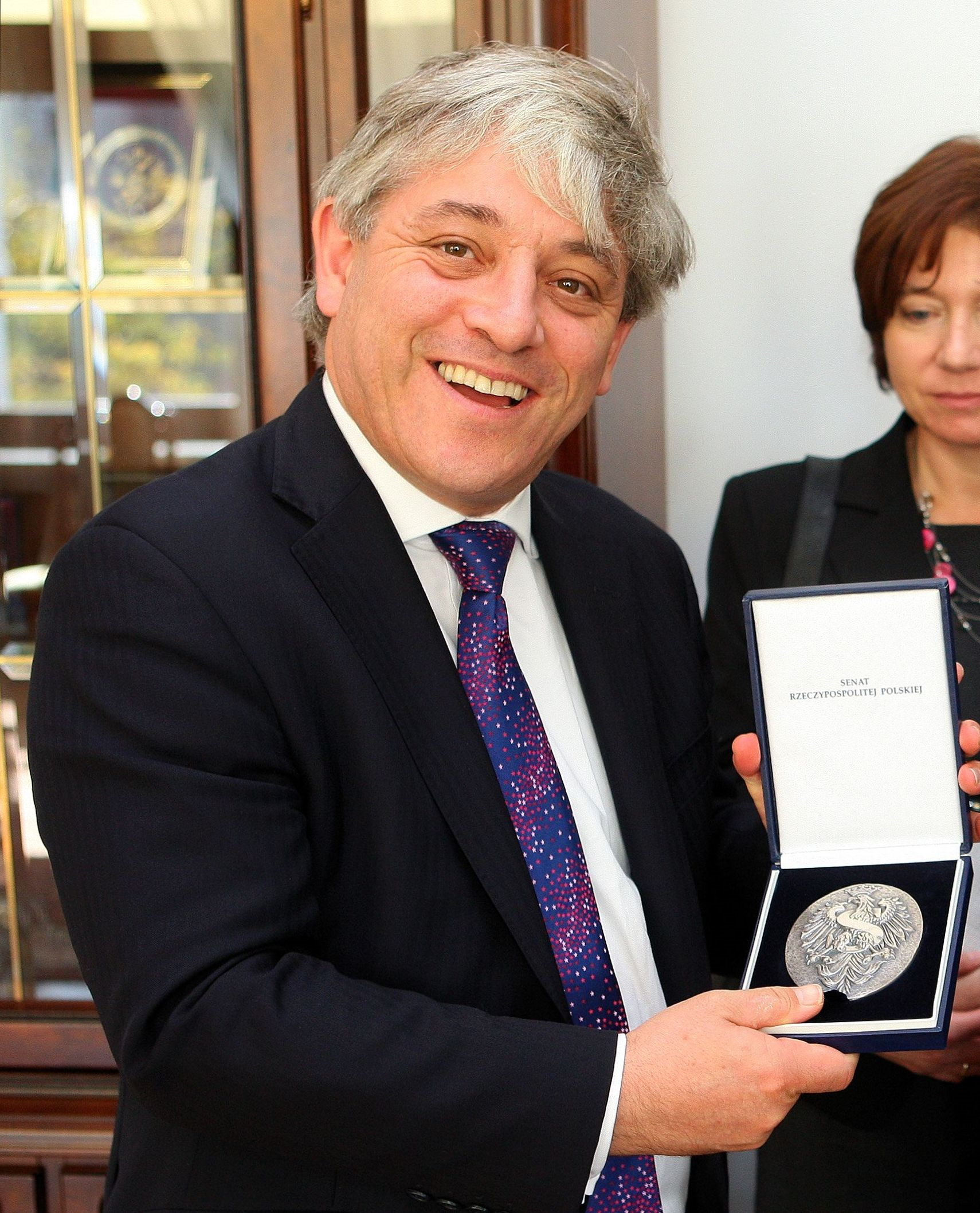
Bercow in Poland in 2010

Bercow was an unsuccessful Conservative candidate in the 1987 general election in Motherwell South, and again at the 1992 general election in Bristol South. In 1996, he paid £1,000 to charter a helicopter so that he could attend the selection meetings for two safe Conservative parliamentary seats on the same day – Buckingham and Surrey Heath – and was selected as the candidate for Buckingham. He has referred to the hiring of the helicopter as "the best £1,000 I have ever spent".

Bercow was first elected to parliament in the 1997 general election as the MP for Buckingham with a majority of 12,386. He then increased his majority at the 2001 general election being elected by a margin of 13,325 votes. He was re-elected at the 2005 general election with an again increased majority of 18,129.

Bercow devoted a notable portion of his maiden speech to praising former Prime Minister Margaret Thatcher, whom he called "the world's greatest living statesman." In 1999, the Almanac of British Politics described him as an "articulate, abrasive and waspish Commons performer" who Tony Blair had labelled as "nasty and ineffectual in equal quantity" for an attack he had made on Robin Cook.

Bercow rose quickly through the opposition's junior offices. He was appointed a frontbench spokesman for Education and Employment in June 1999, and then a frontbench spokesman for Home Affairs in July 2000, before being brought into the shadow cabinet in 2001 by the Conservative leader Iain Duncan Smith. He served as Shadow Chief Secretary to the Treasury from September 2001 to July 2002, and as Shadow Spokesperson for Work and Pensions from July to November 2002. During this first spell on the front benches, Bercow publicly said that he did not think he was ruthless enough to reach the top of politics. In November 2002, when the Labour government introduced the Adoption and Children Act, which would allow unmarried gay and heterosexual couples to adopt children, Duncan Smith imposed a three-line whip requiring Conservative MPs to vote against the bill, rather than allowing a free vote. Arguing that it should be a free vote, Bercow defied the whips and voted with Labour, then resigned from the front bench. As a backbencher he was openly critical of Duncan Smith's leadership.

In November 2003, the new Conservative leader Michael Howard appointed Bercow as Shadow Secretary of State for International Development. Bercow went on to clash with Howard over taxes, immigration and the invasion of Iraq, and was sacked from the front bench in September 2004 after telling Howard that Ann Widdecombe was right to have said that there was "something of the night about him". Bercow has a long-standing interest in Burma and frequently raised issues of democracy and genocide in the country. In 2006, he was a patron of the Tory Reform Group. In 2001, he supported the ban on MPs becoming members of the Monday Club.

Bercow was formerly the treasurer of the All-Party Parliamentary Group for Tribal Peoples, an APPG composed of over 30 cross-party MPs which aims to raise parliamentary and public awareness of tribal peoples.

Bercow won the Stonewall award for Politician of the Year in 2010 for his work to support equality for lesbian, gay and bisexual people. Stonewall gave him a score of 100% for always voting for its position on gay equality issues in parliament between 2007 and 2009.

=== Opposition MP of the Year ===
In 2005, Bercow won the Channel Four/Hansard Society Political Award for 'Opposition MP of the Year'. He said:

In addition to pursuing a wide variety of local issues, I have attempted to question, probe and scrutinise the Government in the House of Commons on important national and international topics which concern people. Over the last 12 months, I have constantly pressed the case for reform of world trade rules to give the poorest people on the planet a chance to sell their products and improve their quality of life. The plight of the people of Darfur, Western Sudan, has also been a regular theme. They have suffered too much for too long with too little done about the situation. I shall go on arguing for Britain to take the lead in the international community in seeking decisive action for peace and justice.

=== Rumours of defection ===
Following the defection of Conservative MP Quentin Davies to the Labour Party in June 2007, there were persistent rumours that Bercow was likely to be the next Conservative MP to leave the party.

Bercow did not at that time defect to Labour, but in September 2007, he accepted an advisory post on Gordon Brown's government's review of support for children with speech, language and communication special needs. The Conservative Party chairman, Caroline Spelman, confirmed that this appointment was with the consent of the Conservative Party. Bercow had a long-term interest in this topic, as his son Oliver has been diagnosed with autism.

=== Bercow review ===
In 2008, Bercow was asked by Labour cabinet members Ed Balls and Alan Johnson to produce a substantial review of children and families affected by speech, language and communication needs (SLCN). After the report, the government pledged £52 million to raise the profile of SLCN within the education field. The review looks at the extreme consequences to which communication problems can lead; from initial frustration at not being able to express oneself, to bullying or being bullied at school, fewer job prospects and even a descent into criminality.

The interim report highlighted a number of core issues: that speech, language and communication are not only essential life skills but fundamental human rights; that early identification of problems and intervention is important to avoid social problems later on; and that the current system of treatment was patchy, i.e. there was a need for services to be continually provided for children and families from an early age.

=== Role in expenses scandal ===
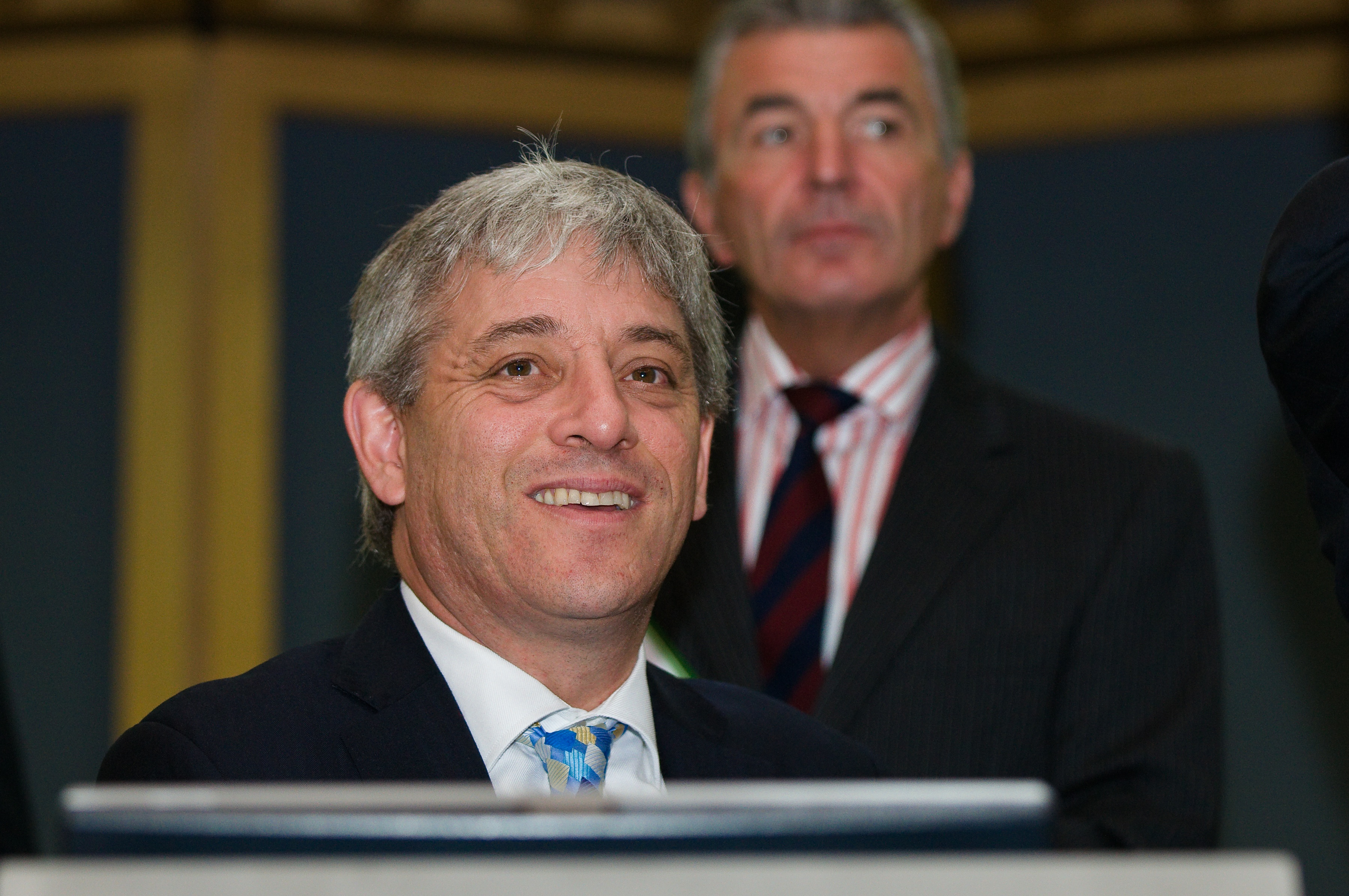
Bercow in 2009

During the 2009 expenses scandal, it was revealed that Bercow changed the designation of his second home on more than one occasion – meaning that he avoided paying capital gains tax on the sale of two properties. He also claimed just under £1,000 to hire an accountant to fill in his tax returns. Bercow denied any wrongdoing, but agreed to pay £6,508 plus VAT to cover any tax that he may have had to pay to HM Revenue and Customs.

It was revealed in 2014 that the House of Commons authorities had destroyed all evidence of MPs' expenses claims prior to 2010. Bercow faced accusations that he had presided over what had been dubbed a "fresh cover-up" of the expenses scandal.

In July 2015, Bercow was again criticised for the amount of his expenses, including a claim of £172 for a 0.7-mile (1.1 km) chauffeur-driven journey. Andy Silvester, campaign director at the TaxPayers' Alliance, said: "This is an obscene waste of money and shows appalling judgment from whoever made the arrangements."

=== Charitable work ===
Bercow has supported a number of charities. He has been a patron of the ME Association, Brain Tumour Research and the Patchwork Foundation, which promotes the positive integration of disadvantaged and minority communities into British democracy and civil society and which was founded by Harris Bokhari. He also spoke at a fundraising event for the mental health charity Jami. In 2018, Bercow supported a fundraiser for Children in Need.

== Speaker of the House of Commons ==
=== Election and first term ===
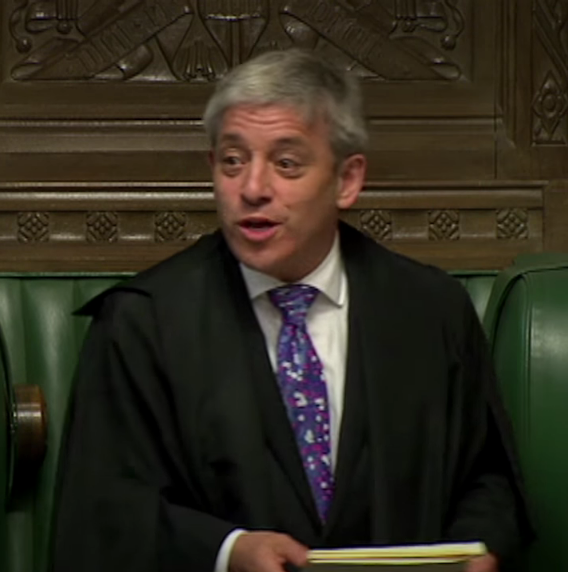
Bercow presides over the House, 2012

Bercow had long campaigned quietly to become speaker and was touted as a successor to Michael Martin. On 20 May 2009, he officially declared his intention to stand in the speakership election, which had been triggered by Martin's resignation and launched his manifesto for the job. In reference to his decision to stand, Bercow said: "I wanted it because I felt that there was a task to be undertaken and that's about strengthening backbench involvement and opportunity in parliament, and helping parliament get off its knees and recognise that it isn't just there as a rubber-stamping operation for the government of the day, and as necessary and appropriate to contradict and expose the government of the day."

In the first round of the election on 22 June, Bercow received 179 votes – more than any other candidate, but short of the majority required for victory. In the third and final round of voting later that day, he defeated George Young by 322 votes to 271, and was approved by the Queen at 10 pm that night as the 157th speaker. In accordance with convention, he rescinded his Conservative Party membership. Bercow was elected by a large number of Labour votes, many MPs being driven by the perception that Michael Martin had been hounded out of the job and wanting his replacement to be someone who was not a Conservative Party favourite.

Bercow was the first speaker to be Jewish, the first one to have been elected by an exhaustive ballot, and the first not to wear traditional court robes while presiding over the House of Commons. In accordance with tradition, Bercow displayed his coat of arms at Speaker's House.

==== Speaker's residence refurbishment ====
Within weeks of taking office as speaker, Bercow ordered a redecoration and refurbishment of the speaker's grace and favour apartment in the Palace of Westminster, partly with the objective of making it child-friendly; the cost was £20,659 and was paid for by Parliament. It followed extensive work on the apartment under the previous speaker.

==== Youth Parliament ====
In October 2009, Bercow chaired the United Kingdom Youth Parliament's first annual sitting in the House of Commons, making them the only group except members of parliament to sit in the chamber. He chaired every subsequent sitting and attended every annual conference until his resignation in 2019, addressing and supporting Members of Youth Parliament from across the UK.

=== 2010 general election and second term ===
The Speaker of the House of Commons is traditionally seen as outside party politics and is often not challenged by the main parties at general elections, including the 2010 general election. In September 2009, Nigel Farage resigned his leadership of the UK Independence Party (UKIP) to stand for Bercow's Buckingham seat, asserting, "This man represents all that is wrong with British politics today. He was embroiled in the expenses saga and he presides over a Parliament that virtually does nothing." John Stevens, another candidate, found support for his campaign from the former Independent MP Martin Bell. Bercow also faced opposition from the British National Party and the Christian Party.

As Bercow lacked a party endorsement and therefore a campaign team, he sought to build one. A group of his supporters known as 'Friends of Speaker Bercow' solicited donations for the campaign, aiming to raise £40,000. When one of their letters was received by a member of UKIP, the recipient referred it to the Parliamentary Commissioner for Standards, complaining that it appeared that Bercow's fundraising campaign was operating from the Speaker's Office, which is required to remain politically neutral. The Commissioner declined to launch an investigation because of the lack of evidence.

==== Speaker's Lectures ====
To mark the centenary of the Parliament Act 1911, Bercow commissioned a series of lectures about the main political figures of the century. The Speaker's Lectures continue with a variety of topics such as historic parliamentarians and current affairs.

=== 2015 general election and third term ===
Bercow won the most votes in Buckingham. In his victory speech, he addressed the issue of the 1289 spoilt ballot papers that were counted in the constituency.

On 26 March 2015, the House of Commons defeated a government motion (introduced by former Conservative party leader and then leader of the House of Commons William Hague) to require a secret ballot on whether Bercow would remain speaker after the 2015 general election. A number of MPs described it as an underhand plot to oust Bercow, largely based on the timing of the motion just before the dissolution of Parliament when some Labour MPs expected to oppose it had already returned to their constituencies. In the event, Bercow was re-elected unopposed as Speaker following the general election.

In February 2017, Bercow said he had supported continued membership of the European Union in the 2016 referendum.

On 6 February 2017, Bercow said in the house that he would be "strongly opposed" to US President Donald Trump addressing the Houses of Parliament during his planned state visit to the UK, and told MPs that "opposition to racism and sexism" were "hugely important considerations". The comments proved controversial and made the headlines in many UK newspapers the following day, with some such as Guardian columnist Owen Jones, Labour leader Jeremy Corbyn, Labour MP Dennis Skinner and Liberal Democrat leader Tim Farron supporting this intervention. His comments were criticised by some opponents of Trump, such as Conservative MP Nadhim Zahawi, for being hypocritical and undermining the speaker's neutrality, and some in the government reportedly felt that Bercow had overstepped his role. John Whittingdale, the Conservative MP for Maldon and a former Culture Secretary, dismissed Bercow's remarks as "playing to the gallery for as much publicity as possible", and Bercow himself apologised to the Lord Speaker Lord Fowler over a lack of consultation over his remarks.

=== 2017 general election and fourth term ===
Following the 2017 general election, Bercow was re-elected unopposed as speaker by members of parliament on 13 June 2017.

==== Brexit ====
In January 2019, Bercow broke with convention, allowing a vote on an amendment to a government business motion. The amendment, tabled by Dominic Grieve MP, required Prime Minister Theresa May to table a motion within three days on proposed alternative plans if her Brexit deal was rejected by Parliament.

On 18 March 2019, Bercow, in a statement to the House, pre-empted a move by the Government to bring the UK/EU Withdrawal Agreement for a third vote. Citing a convention which dates back to 1604, Bercow stated that he would not allow a vote on a motion which was "substantially the same" as a previously rejected motion.

During the Brexit debates throughout that year, his particular speaking style and calls for order received widespread attention in viral videos on social media outside the UK "I apparently say it in a way that amuses some people. I suspect it's some interest in what is regarded as English eccentricity," he told Der Spiegel in April 2019. "I inherited my speaking style from my late father. It obviously provokes comment. Some people say, "Oh, we like the way he speaks." And other people say, "That bloke's an irritating clot, he's horrible." Well, my argument is that I'm authentic. And I'm just being me. It's not a contrivance. It's not a put-on show. It's the way I am." He told CBS' 60 Minutes in 2019 that "quite quickly my wife and kids drew my attention to the fact that they saw on the internet that there was a lot of interest in other countries."

== Retirement as speaker and career after parliament ==
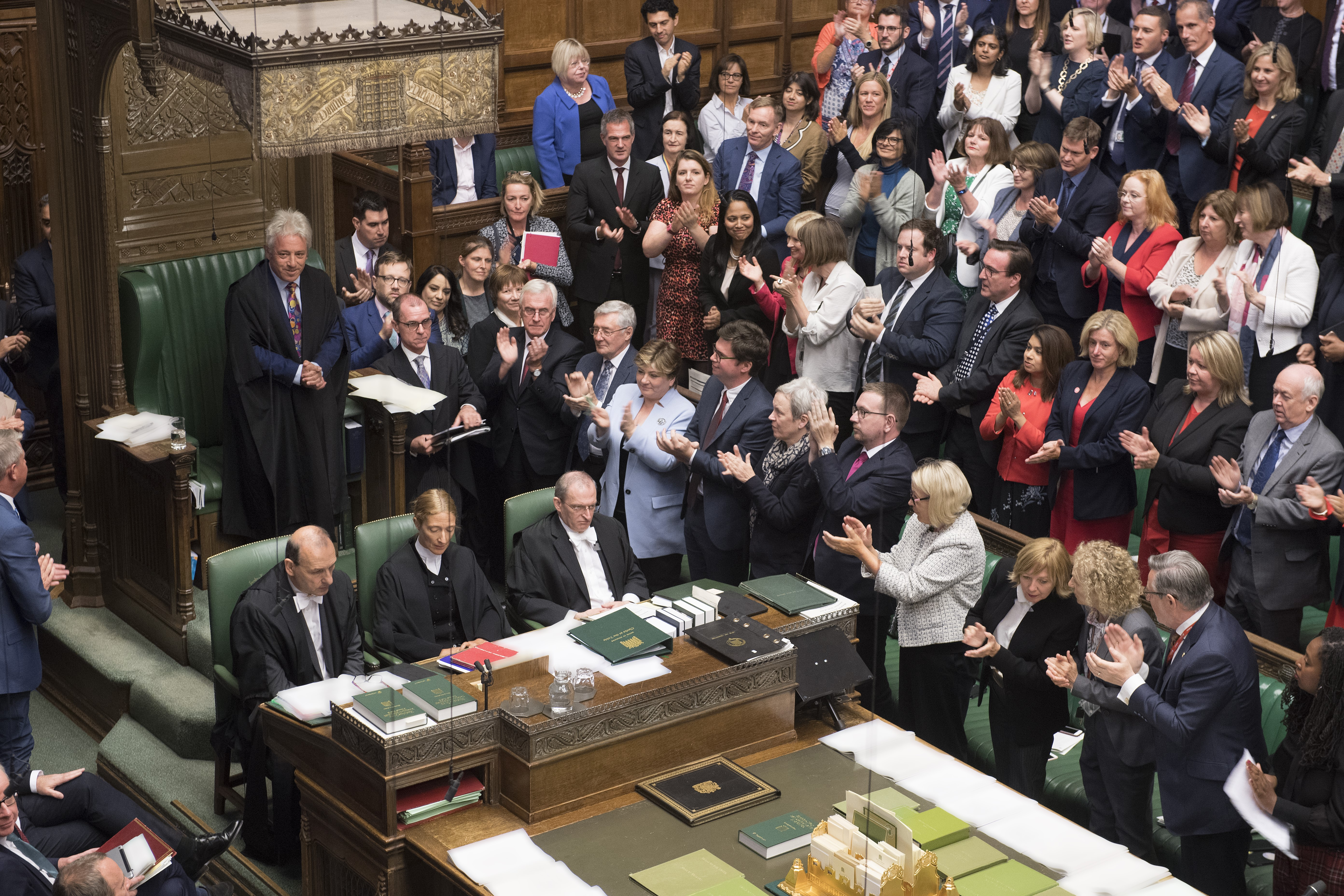
MPs applaud Bercow as he sets the date for his retirement

Having been in the role for 10 years, Bercow became the longest-serving speaker since Edward FitzRoy, who served nearly 15 years in post between 1928 and 1943.

In October 2018, it was reported that Bercow intended to step down as speaker in the summer of 2019, but in January 2019 it was reported that he planned to stay as speaker until the end of the parliament, in 2022. On 9 September 2019, amid debates about Brexit and parliament being prorogued, Bercow declared to the House of Commons that he would stand down on 31 October, or at the next general election, whichever was sooner; the former applied.

Despite the convention that former speakers of the House of Commons are elevated to membership of the House of Lords when they resign, prime minister Boris Johnson denied Bercow a peerage because it was perceived that he had not maintained political neutrality in office and would not be politically neutral in the House of Lords as convention requires. Sources in the Cabinet had suggested beforehand that this would be due to his rulings during the Parliamentary votes on Brexit, which the Government saw as biased against them. Bercow became the first ex-speaker since the retirement of Arthur Onslow in 1761 to have been eligible for, but not have been made the offer of, a peerage. Overall, he is the tenth speaker not to receive a peerage since the 1707 Act of Union, and the fifth since Onslow's retirement not to be immediately elevated to the House of Lords. (Charles Wolfran Cornwall died in office with no peerage offer to his surviving family, John Henry Whitley was offered but declined, and following the deaths of Edward FitzRoy and Sir Harry Hylton-Foster in office, their widows were ennobled instead.) With no prospect of a government-sponsored peerage, Bercow lobbied the Labour leader, Jeremy Corbyn, in the hope that the opposition might give him preferment. He was nominated for a peerage by Corbyn, but this was refused by Johnson.

In November 2019, Bercow retired from the Commons using the Steward and Bailiff of the Manor of Northstead mechanism.

In the same month, Bercow stated that he "think[s] that Brexit is the biggest foreign policy mistake in the post-war period, and that is my honest view." This led to further questions about Bercow's impartiality during the Brexit parliamentary debates. He maintained that he was impartial during the debates, and only made his views clear after leaving office.

He joined Sky News for its election night coverage of the 2019 general election on December 12, 2019. Later that month, he delivered the Alternative Christmas message on Channel 4.

His autobiography, Unspeakable, was published in 2020. In his memoirs, he was highly critical of David Cameron, Theresa May, Boris Johnson and Andrea Leadsom. Bercow has since identified himself as a soft leftist and declared that he voted for Sadiq Khan to be Mayor of London. Bercow has also been very critical of the British government response to the COVID-19 pandemic since leaving Parliament.

On 19 June 2021, Bercow said that he had joined the Labour Party "a few weeks ago". He said Boris Johnson's Conservative Party was "reactionary, populist, nationalistic and sometimes even xenophobic." He said his move to Labour was motivated by his "support for equality, social justice and internationalism. That is the Labour brand."

While Bercow originally "proposed before he leaves office to waive his entitlement to the Speaker's pension until he reaches the age of 65", in 2021 he revealed he started taking the pension when he left the office, after speaking with his wife.

Bercow has participated in a number of "celebrity" and reality TV shows in Britain and the US.

In 2024, Bercow provided the voice of the Robot Speaker of the House of Commons in the Fallout mod Fallout: London.

== Bullying of office staff ==
In May 2018, Bercow's former private secretary Angus Sinclair alleged on the BBC's Newsnight programme that Bercow had repeatedly bullied him while at work. Sinclair said that he was told to sign a non-disclosure agreement when he left his post, to prevent him revealing Bercow's bullying. Bercow denied the claims. Sinclair's allegations came not long after the BBC reported that his successor as Bercow's private secretary, Kate Emms, had been signed off work and then moved to another role. Unnamed colleagues of Emms had told the BBC's Newsnight programme that her sickness and change of role were because of bullying by Bercow.

In October 2018, Bercow called for an independent body to be set up to investigate allegations of harassment and bullying in Parliament. He faced calls to quit after an independent report by Dame Laura Cox found that harassment and bullying had been tolerated and concealed for years, which Bercow denies. On 23 October 2018, three Conservative MPs, Will Quince, Mims Davies and Anne Milton, resigned from the Commons Reference Group on Representation and Inclusion, which is chaired by Bercow, and cited Bercow's handling of bullying and sexual harassment allegations in Parliament as the reason for doing so.

In January 2020, Lord Lisvane, who served as Clerk of the House of Commons under Bercow, submitted a formal complaint to the Parliamentary Commissioner for Standards. In the same month Lisvane's complaint was followed up by a further accusation of bullying, made by the former Black Rod, Lieutenant-General David Leakey.

In early 2022, Bercow appealed an internal decision by the Parliamentary Commissioner for Standards, Kathryn Stone which had upheld 21 allegations out of 35 brought by Lord Lisvane and private secretaries Kate Emms and Angus Sinclair against Bercow. In March 2022, the Independent Expert Panel upheld the findings of the Parliamentary Commissioner for Standards, concluding that Bercow had "been widely unreliable and repeatedly dishonest in his evidence", a "serial liar" and a "serial bully". Formally reprimanding Bercow, the Panel recommended that, as he was no longer a Member of Parliament and could not, therefore, be expelled from the House of Commons, "he should never be permitted a pass to the Parliamentary estate". Bercow rejected the Panel's findings and declared the body—which included a former Lord Justice of Appeal and a former Chief Coroner—to be a "kangaroo court" lacking in legal expertise. Lisvane dismissed Bercow's rejection as "hysterical petulance from someone caught bang to rights". As a result, Bercow was suspended from the Labour Party.

== Personal life ==
Bercow married Sally Illman in 2002 after 13 years of an "on-off" relationship. They have three children. Their elder son, Oliver, is autistic. Sally had an affair with Bercow's cousin in 2015, but she later returned to the marriage; Bercow said he bore some responsibility for the affair by not providing enough time for his wife. His wife, who used to be a Conservative, switched to supporting the Labour Party, campaigning for both her husband individually and for Labour more broadly in the 1997 election. Bercow and those close to him reject the view that she was especially influential in changing his political views. Both he and his wife are teetotallers.

Bercow is a humanist, and before taking the role of Speaker was a member of the All-Party Parliamentary Humanist Group. When discussing the role of clergy in Parliament, he described himself in a Commons debate as "an irreligious person taking a secular interest in an important subject".

Bercow has been a fan of Arsenal F.C. since January 1971 and is a season ticket holder. He always attends games with his son and has appeared on AFTV. Bercow is also a lifelong follower of tennis, having played competitively against the likes of Andrew Castle and Jeremy Bates in his youth. His book on the sport, Tennis Maestros: The Twenty Greatest Male Tennis Players of All Time, was published in 2014 by Biteback Publishing.

Bercow and his wife are directors and shareholders of Fedhead Limited, an information service company.

== Books ==
- Tennis Maestros: The Twenty Greatest Male Tennis Players of All Time. Biteback Publishing. 2 June 2014. ISBN 9781849547659.
- Unspeakable: The Autobiography. W&N. 6 February 2020. ISBN 978-1474616621.

== Arms ==
Coat of arms of John Bercow
Notes Granted in 2011 Crest Upon a helm with a wreath Or Azure and Gules in front of a demi swan wings inverted and expanded Proper gorged with a coronet Or and holding in its beak a Pink triangle Proper a portcullis sans chains Or within an annulet per pale Gules and Azure all in front of a rainbow Proper. Escutcheon Per pale Azure and Gules four roundels in bend Or between the rungs of a ladder bendwise throughout Argent all between two seaxes bendwise points upwards and cutting edges outwards Or. Motto All Are Equal Badge In front of a seaxe fesswise point to the sinister and cutting edge upwards Or a wyvern Azure legged and tailed Gules charged on the wings with bezants (four being manifest) grasping with its claws the quillons of the seaxe.

== Honours ==
Country	Date	Appointment	Post-nominal letters
United Kingdom	2009–present	Member of His Majesty's Most Honourable Privy Council	PC

=== Scholastic ===
University degrees

Location	Date	School	Degree
England	1985	University of Essex	First-class honours Bachelor of Arts (BA) in Government

Chancellor, visitor, governor, rector and fellowships

Location	Date	School	Position
England	2014–	University of Bedfordshire	Chancellor
England	18 July 2017 – 12 November 2021	University of Essex	Chancellor
England	27 January 2017 – present	University of Manchester	Honorary Professor
England	4 November 2019 – present	Birkbeck, University of London	Fellowship
England	24 January 2020 – present	Royal Holloway, University of London	Professorship of Politics

Honorary degrees

Location	Date	School	Degree
England	2010	University of Essex	Doctor of the University (D.Univ)
England	16 March 2013	University of Buckingham	Doctor of Laws (LL.D)
England	23 January 2014	De Montfort University	Doctorate
England	30 January 2014	City, University of London	Doctor of Science (D.Sc.)

=== Freedom of the City ===
Location	Date	Award
England	4 July 2016	Freedom of the City of London (London)

Parliament of the United Kingdom
Preceded by George Walden	Member of Parliament for Buckingham; 1997–2019	Succeeded by Greg Smith
Preceded by Michael Martin	Speaker of the House of Commons; 2009–2019	Succeeded by Lindsay Hoyle
Political offices
Preceded by Oliver Letwin	Shadow Chief Secretary to the Treasury; 2001–2002	Succeeded by Howard Flight
Preceded by Caroline Spelman	Shadow Secretary of State for International Development; 2003–2004	Succeeded by Alan Duncan
Academic offices
Preceded by The Baroness Howells of St Davids	Chancellor of the University of Bedfordshire; 2014–	Vacant Title next held by Sarfraz Manzoor
Preceded by Shami Chakrabarti	Chancellor of the University of Essex; 2017–2021	Vacant Title next held by Sarah Perry
