= Sarfraz Manzoor =

British broadcaster and writer

Sarfraz Manzoor سرفراز منظور
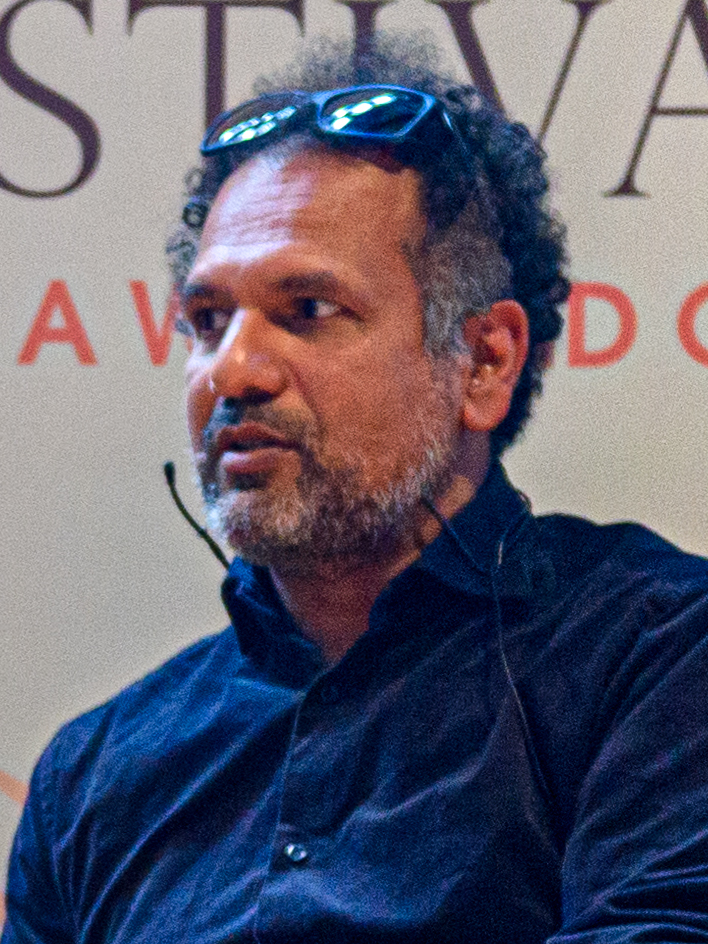
- Manzoor in 2021
- Born: 9 June 1971 (age 55); Lyallpur, Punjab, Pakistan
- Education: University of Manchester (BA)
- Occupations: Journalist, broadcaster, screenwriter
- Spouse: Bridget Manzoor

Chancellor of the University of Bedfordshire
- Incumbent
- Assumed office 2023
- Vice Chancellor: Rebecca Bunting
- Preceded by: John Bercow

Sarfraz Manzoor (Urdu: سرفراز منظور; born 9 June 1971) is a British journalist, documentary maker, broadcaster, and screenwriter of Pakistani origin. He is a regular contributor to The Guardian, presenter of documentaries on BBC Radio 4, and a cultural commentator who appears on programmes such as Newsnight Review and Saturday Review. His first book, Greetings from Bury Park, was published in 2007.

== Early life and education ==
Manzoor was born in Lyallpur (now Faisalabad), the second largest city in Punjab Province and the third largest in Pakistan. He emigrated to Britain in May 1974 with his mother, older brother and sister to join their father, Mohammed Manzoor, who had left Pakistan in 1963 to find work. Manzoor attended Maidenhall Infants and Primary Schools in the Bury Park district of Luton.

In the autumn of 1979, Manzoor's family moved to the Marsh Farm estate and he attended Wauluds Primary School. In the autumn of 1982, he began his studies at Lea Manor High School. After completing A levels at Luton Sixth Form College, Manzoor left Luton to study Economics and Politics at Manchester University. Three days before Manzoor turned 24 in 1995, his father died.

== Career ==
Manzoor worked for six years at ITN, as a producer and reporter on Channel 4 News interviewing such figures as Woody Allen, Brian Wilson, Sinéad O'Connor, Peter Gabriel, Don McCullin and Charlie Watts. He left Channel 4 News and joined Channel 4 as a deputy commissioning editor, before signing a contract with Bloomsbury Publishing for his first book.

Manzoor scripted The Great British Asian Invasion for Channel 4 and wrote and directed Death of a Porn Star for the same network, which told the tragic story of the life and death of Lolo Ferrari. He presented a documentary for Channel 4 on the 2006 Guardian Hay Book Festival On the Way to Hay in which he interviewed Monica Ali and Will Self.

In March 2005, Manzoor wrote and presented Luton Actually, a documentary for BBC 2. The programme, a personal and affectionate portrait of his hometown, featured Manzoor tracing his family's journey from Pakistan to Luton.

In 2007, he published Greetings from Bury Park, a memoir that detailed his life growing up in Luton and the twin impacts upon him of the death of his father in 1995 and the music and especially the lyrics of Bruce Springsteen. Manzoor had admired the United States, wishing to live there, but after the experience of witnessing the 9/11 attacks in 2001 he came to view Britain as being his true home.

Manzoor has written and presented documentaries for BBC Radio 4. These include From Luton Streets to Jersey Shores, for which he travelled to New Jersey to examine the connections between his hometown of Luton and Springsteen's New Jersey; Don't Call Me Asian, which examined the rise in British Indians and Pakistanis defining themselves by their religion and nationality rather than simply as British Asians; A Class Apart, which explored the consequences of faith schools on social cohesion; Taking the Cricket Test, which saw Manzoor follow the Pakistan cricket team across England during the 2006 test series; a documentary profile of Little Richard, who was interviewed; a programme on matrimonial websites in August 2009; a three-part series Whatever Happened to the Working Class? in February 2009 and a programme that told the story of the George Harrison album Wonderwall Music in March 2009.

Manzoor contributed an article "White Girls" to the literary quarterly Granta, issue 112.

Manzoor has written for Daily Mail, The Guardian, The Independent, New Statesman, The Observer, Prospect, The Spectator, Uncut, Marie Claire and The Times.

Manzoor was appointed as Chancellor of the University of Bedfordshire in 2023.

== Personal life ==
In 2010, Manzoor married Bridget, a speech and language therapist, a union initially disapproved of by his mother and siblings because she was a non-Muslim white woman. The couple have two children.

== Works ==
Non-fiction:

- Greetings from Bury Park, or Greetings from Bury Park: Race, Religion and Rock 'n' Roll (2007), ISBN 9780747577119, memoirs
- They, or They: What Muslims and Non-Muslims Get Wrong About Each Other (2021), ISBN 9781472266835, society

== Film ==
A film inspired by his life, Blinded by the Light, was released in August 2019. Manzoor co-wrote the script, with Gurinder Chadha and Paul Mayeda Berges. It is based on Manzoor's memoir Greetings from Bury Park.

Academic offices
Vacant Title last held by John Bercow	Chancellor of the University of Bedfordshire; 2023-	Incumbent
