= Unspeakable =

Unspeakable may refer to:

== Film ==
- The Unspeakable, a 1924 Polish silent film
- Unspeakable (2000 film)
- Unspeakable (2002 film), a horror film
- Unspeakable (2006 film), a documentary by John Paskievich
- Unspeakable: The Life & Art of Reverend Steven Johnson Leyba, a 2002 documentary film about Steven Johnson Leyba
- Unspeakable, a 2017 television film starring Indira Varma

== Literature ==
- Unspeakable (Harry Potter), a job in J. K. Rowling's fictional Harry Potter universe
- Unspeakable: The Autobiography, a 2020 memoir by John Bercow
- Unspeakable: The Tulsa Race Massacre, a picture book by Carole Boston Weatherford and Floyd Cooper

== Music ==
- Unspeakable (album), by Bill Frisell, 2004
- "Unspeakable" (song), by Ace of Base, 2002
- "Unspeakable", a song by Every Little Thing from Untitled 4 Ballads

== People ==
- Unspeakable (YouTuber) (born 1997), American YouTuber

== Television ==
- Unspeakable (TV series), a Canadian drama series
- "Unspeakable" (Doctors), a 2003 episode
