= Carsten Maple =

Carsten Maple (born October 1971) is professor of cyber systems engineering at the University of Warwick. He was previously professor of applicable computing at the University of Bedfordshire. He is a fellow of the British Computer Society and vice-chair of the Council of Professors and Heads of Computing, UK. He is also co-director of the National Centre for Cyberstalking Research and a trustee of Protection Against Stalking.
