= Olonisakin =

Ọlọ́níṣakin
- Gender: Male
- Language: Yoruba

Origin
- Origin: Nigerian
- Meaning: It is God that makes the brave one.
- Region of origin: South West, Nigeria

Ọlọ́níṣakin is a Nigerian surname of Yoruba origin, typically bestowed upon males. It means "It is God that makes the brave one" The name is relatively uncommon.

== Notable individuals with the name ==
- Abayomi Olonisakin (born 1961), Nigerian Chief of Defence Staff
- Dami Olonisakin (born 1990), British Nigerian sex educator and relationship advisor
- Temi Olonisakin (born 1994), British Nigerian Doctor and Advocate
- Funmi Olonisakin (born 1965), British Nigerian scholar
