= Speaker's Lectures =

Presentations initiated by John Bercow

The Speaker's Lectures were series of lectures initiated by John Bercow, the Speaker of the House of Commons, from 2011 to 2019. To mark the centenary of the Parliament Act 1911, Bercow commissioned a series of 11 lectures throughout 2011 covering some of the main political figures of the century. Each lecture was given to an invited audience in Speaker's House and was recorded for broadcast on BBC Parliament. In 2012 Bercow instituted a new 11 lecture series on the subject of the 'Great Offices of State' (those of Chancellor of the Exchequer, Home Secretary and Foreign Secretary). In 2013 the lectures were on the subject of 'Parliaments and Parliamentarians', given by leading Parliamentarians who have experience of other legislatures. The 2014 series concentrated on 'Parliamentarians on Public Policy'. In 2015 and 2016, Bercow instituted the theme of 'Parliamentarians on Parliamentarians', based on prominent Parliamentarians throughout history. The 2017 series focused on 'The Future of...' various political topics, such as the Press, Armed Forces, or Brexit. The penultimate 2018 series was divided into two parts, with the first being 'Brexit and beyond, Britain's place in the world in the 2020s', and the second 'Women and British Politics, where next?'. The 2019 series carried the theme 'What if?', discussing hypothetical political scenarios from recent history. This series was cut short as Bercow's status and role in Brexit became elevated. There is no plan for the series to continue under the following Speaker, Lindsay Hoyle.

== '1911 Centenary' lectures ==
The first series of lectures, starting in 2011, covered the careers of some of the great parliamentarians of the past 100 years. The subjects were:

- David Lloyd George by Lord Morgan, 11 January
- F. E. Smith by Sir Peter Tapsell, 1 February
- Nancy Astor by Baroness Williams of Crosby, 29 March
- Sir Winston Churchill by Nicholas Soames, 26 April
- Aneurin Bevan by Gordon Marsden, 17 May
- Enoch Powell by Lord Norton of Louth, 14 June
- Michael Foot by Lord Kinnock, 12 July
- Iain Macleod by Lord Hurd of Westwell, 6 September
- Roy Jenkins by Lord Adonis, 25 October
- Margaret Thatcher by John Whittingdale, 15 November
- Tony Benn by Tristram Hunt, 6 December

== 'Great Offices of State' lectures ==
The 2012 lectures surrounded the great offices of state. In introducing the first lecture, Bercow noted that his assistant had spotted that there were 11 sitting Members who had served in one or more of these offices but had not been Prime Minister, and that all had accepted his invitation to give a lecture. The lecturers were:

- Kenneth Clarke (Home Secretary 1992–93, Chancellor of the Exchequer 1993–97), 24 January
- Alistair Darling (Chancellor of the Exchequer 2007–10), 20 February
- Theresa May (Home Secretary 2010–16), 26 March
- Malcolm Rifkind (Foreign Secretary 1995–97), 23 April
- David Blunkett (Home Secretary 2001–04), 15 May
- David Miliband (Foreign Secretary 2007–10), 19 June
- Jack Straw (Home Secretary 1997–2001, Foreign Secretary 2001–06), 15 July
- Margaret Beckett (Foreign Secretary 2006–07), 11 September
- George Osborne (Chancellor of the Exchequer 2010–16), 22 October
- Alan Johnson (Home Secretary 2009–10), 5 November
- William Hague (Foreign Secretary 2010–14), 18 December

== 'Parliaments and Parliamentarians' lectures ==
The 2013 lectures were given by leading Parliamentarians who have experience of other legislatures. The lecturers were:

- Lord Alderdice (Speaker of the Northern Ireland Assembly 1998-2004), 29 January
- Keith Vaz on the Parliament of India, February
- Lord Steel of Aikwood (Presiding Officer of the Scottish Parliament 1999-2003), 18 March
- Lord Davies of Stamford on the National Assembly of France, April
- Lord Boateng on the Parliament of South Africa, Parliament of Ghana and the Parliament of Somaliland, 20 May
- Lord Elis-Thomas (Presiding Officer of the National Assembly for Wales 1999–2011), 11 June
- Gisela Stuart on the German Bundestag, 2 July
- Baroness Liddell of Coatdyke on the Parliament of Australia, 28 October
- Baroness Nicholson of Winterbourne on the European Parliament, 10 December
- Baroness Williams of Crosby on the United States Congress, 18 December

== 'Parliamentarians on Public Policy' lectures ==
The 2014 series of lectures was given by Members of Parliament and Members of the House of Lords with a particular expertise or interest in specific areas of public policy. The lectures and subjects are:

- Lord Norton of Louth on Parliament and Political Parties, 21 January
- Dame Tessa Jowell on Parliament and the Press, 25 February
- John Redwood on Parliament and Economic Policy, 18 March
- Frank Field on Parliament and Social Policy, 8 April
- Sir Malcolm Rifkind on Parliament and Foreign Policy and War, May
- Tristram Hunt on Parliament and the Crown, June
- Lord Heseltine on Parliament and Industrial Policy, 18 June
- Harriet Harman on Parliament and Equality, 8 July
- Sir Menzies Campbell on Parliament and Justice, September
- David Davis on Parliament and Liberty, 22 October
- Lord Hennessy of Nympsfield on Parliament and the State, 18 November
- Sir Tony Baldry on Parliament and the Church, 16 December

== 'Parliamentarians on Parliamentarians' lectures (2015) ==
The 2015 series covered famous Parliamentarians from history. The subjects were:

- William Hague on William Pitt the Younger, 13 January
- Lord Hurd of Westwell on Benjamin Disraeli, 24 March
- Lord Bew on Charles Stewart Parnell, 19 May
- Kwasi Kwarteng on Lord Palmerston, 9 June
- Lord Lexden on the Earl of Shaftesbury, 30 June
- Lord Williams of Elvel on Harold Macmillan, 14 July
- Sir Bill Cash on John Bright, 15 September
- Jesse Norman on Edmund Burke, 27 October
- Lord Norton of Louth on Eleanor Rathbone, 3 November
- Lord Cormack on William Wilberforce, 10 November
- Tristram Hunt on John Pym, 8 December

== 'Parliamentarians on Parliamentarians' lectures (2016) ==
The 2016 series covered noted Parliamentarians from recent history. The lecturers were:

- Lord Morgan on James Callaghan, 19 January
- Lord Steel of Aikwood on Jo Grimond, 8 February
- Tristram Hunt on Harold Wilson, 7 March
- Lord Radice on Hugh Gaitskell, 18 April
- Lord Lexden on Anthony Eden, 10 May
- Nick Thomas-Symonds on Michael Foot, 11 July
- Dame Margaret Beckett on John Smith, 7 November
- Chris Patten on Edward Heath, 8 November
- Baroness Williams of Crosby on Charles Kennedy, 29 November
- Gordon Marsden on Clement Attlee, 12 December

== 'The Future of...' lectures ==
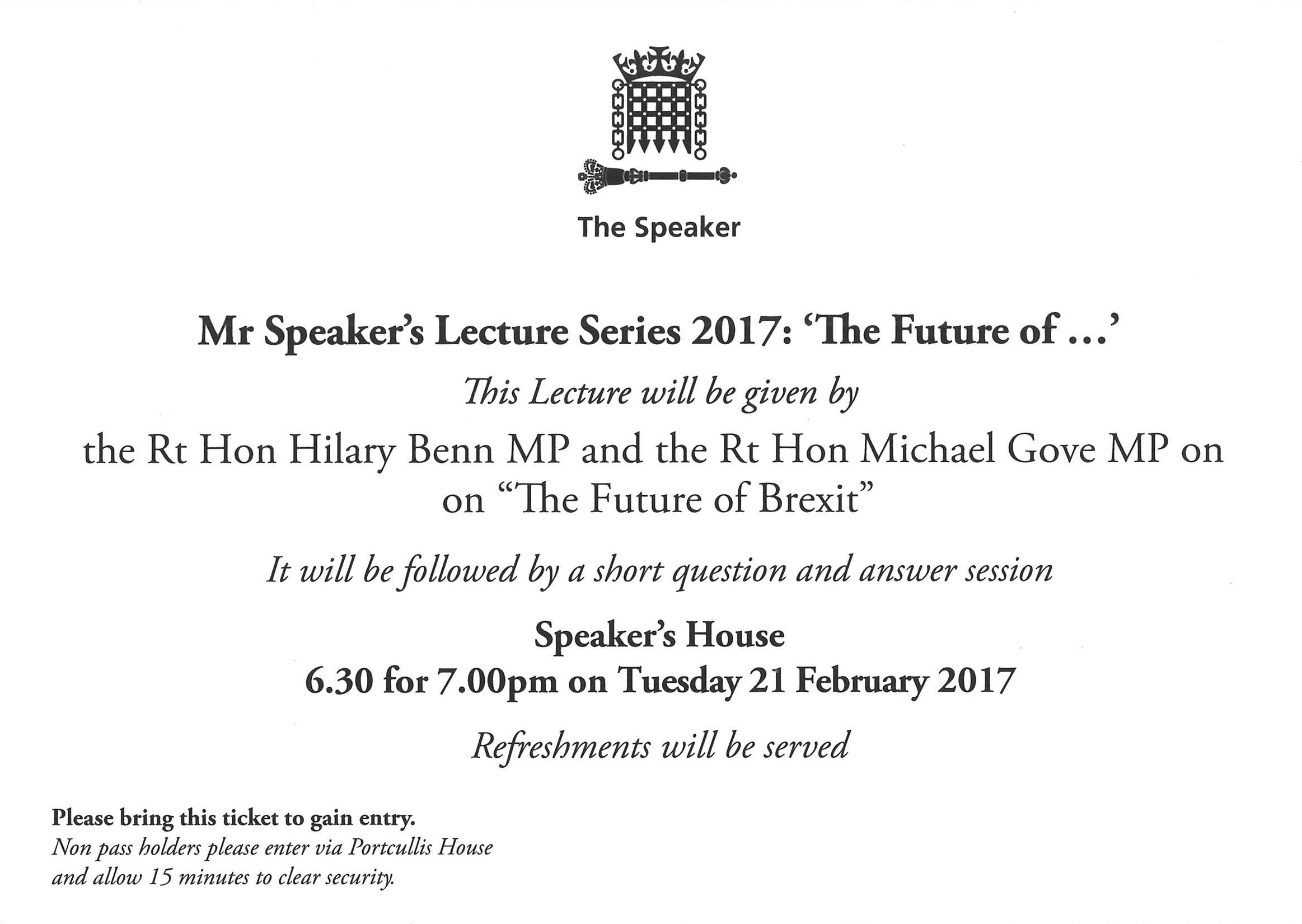
An invitation to the Speaker's Lecture on "The Future of Brexit", delivered by Hilary Benn and Michael Gove, and chaired by the Speaker, John Bercow.

The 2017 lecture covered the future of various issues, institutions, and causes. In this series Bercow also introduced a respondent, often a speaker external to Parliament.

- Julian Lewis, responded to by Deborah Haynes, on "The Future of the Armed Forces", 16 January
- Hilary Benn, responded to by Michael Gove, on "The Future of Brexit", 21 February
- James Purnell, responded to by Maria Miller, on "The Future of Broadcasting", 1 March
- Lord Willetts, responded to by Maddalaine Ansell, on "The Future of Higher Education", 29 March
- Sarah Wollaston, responded to by Chris Ham, on "The Future of the NHS", 11 July
- Lord Maude of Horsham, responded to by Bronwen Maddox, on "The Future of the Civil Service", 12 September
- John Whittingdale, responded to by Jim Waterson, on "The Future of the Press", 17 October
- Caroline Flint, responded to by Drew Hendry, on "The Future of Energy", 14 November
- Norman Lamb, responded to by Caroline Abrahams, on "The Future of Social Care", 27 November
- Damian Collins, responded to by Frances Morris, on "The Future of Museums, Libraries and Galleries", 5 December

== 'Brexit and beyond, Britain's place in the world in the 2020s' lectures ==
The first half of the 2018 lectures concerned Brexit and the status of Britain after departure from the European Union.

- Kenneth Clarke, 29 January
- John Redwood, 20 February
- Tony Blair, 26 March
- Liam Fox, 30 April
- Nick Clegg, 21 May
- Jacob Rees-Mogg, 18 June

== 'Women and British Politics, where next?' lectures ==
The second half of the 2018 lectures tackled women's role in British politics.

- Stella Creasy, 17 July
- Harriet Harman, 22 October
- Anna Soubry, 19 November
- Joanna Cherry, 21 January 2019 (rescheduled)

== 'What if?' lectures ==
In 2019, the lecture theme instituted returned to the historical nature of previous series, yet with a hypothetical twist. As the Brexit Withdrawal Agreement went through Parliament, John Bercow gained a higher profile. Due to this and the 2019 general election, the lectures were cut short.

- Lord Adonis on "What if Harold Wilson had fallen and Roy Jenkins became Prime Minister in 1968?", 25 February
- Lord Norton of Louth on "What if Ted Heath had resigned in October 1974 and Willie Whitelaw had become Tory Leader?", 18 March
- Gordon Marsden on "What if Dennis Healey had beaten Michael Foot and become Labour leader in 1981?", 29 April
