= Parliamentary Academy =

The Parliamentary Academy was founded in 2012 by Robert Halfon MP, New Deal of the Mind and the National Skills Academy. The Parliament of the United Kingdom is notorious for its intern culture. A survey by the Unite the Union found that interns in Parliament carry out an astonishing 18,000 hours of unpaid work a week. Some 44 per cent of interns said MPs did not even pay them travel or food expenses. Some MPs employ more than five interns in their offices. Up to 500 interns are operating in parliament at any one time.

== Overview ==
The Parliamentary Academy scheme offers non-graduate, 18- to 24-year-olds the opportunity to take up a paid, 12-month placement in an MP's parliamentary office. They work four-day weeks, including two days a month working towards an NVQ level 2/3 in business administration. "The aim is to open up politics to young people from a much broader background and get them a decent qualification at the same time," says Halfon. The next round of the Parliamentary Academy will begin in Summer 2013.

== Participants ==
MPs who have participated in the Parliamentary Academy pilot scheme include:

- Michael Crockart, Liberal Democrat Member of Parliament. Member for Edinburgh West since 6 May 2010 general election.
- Andrea Leadsom, Conservative Member of Parliament. Member for South Northamptonshire since 6 May 2010 general election.
- John Woodcock, Labour/Co-operative member of Parliament for Barrow and Furness since 6 May 2010 general election.
