= Robert Halfon =

British Conservative politician (born 1969)

The Right Honourable Robert Halfon
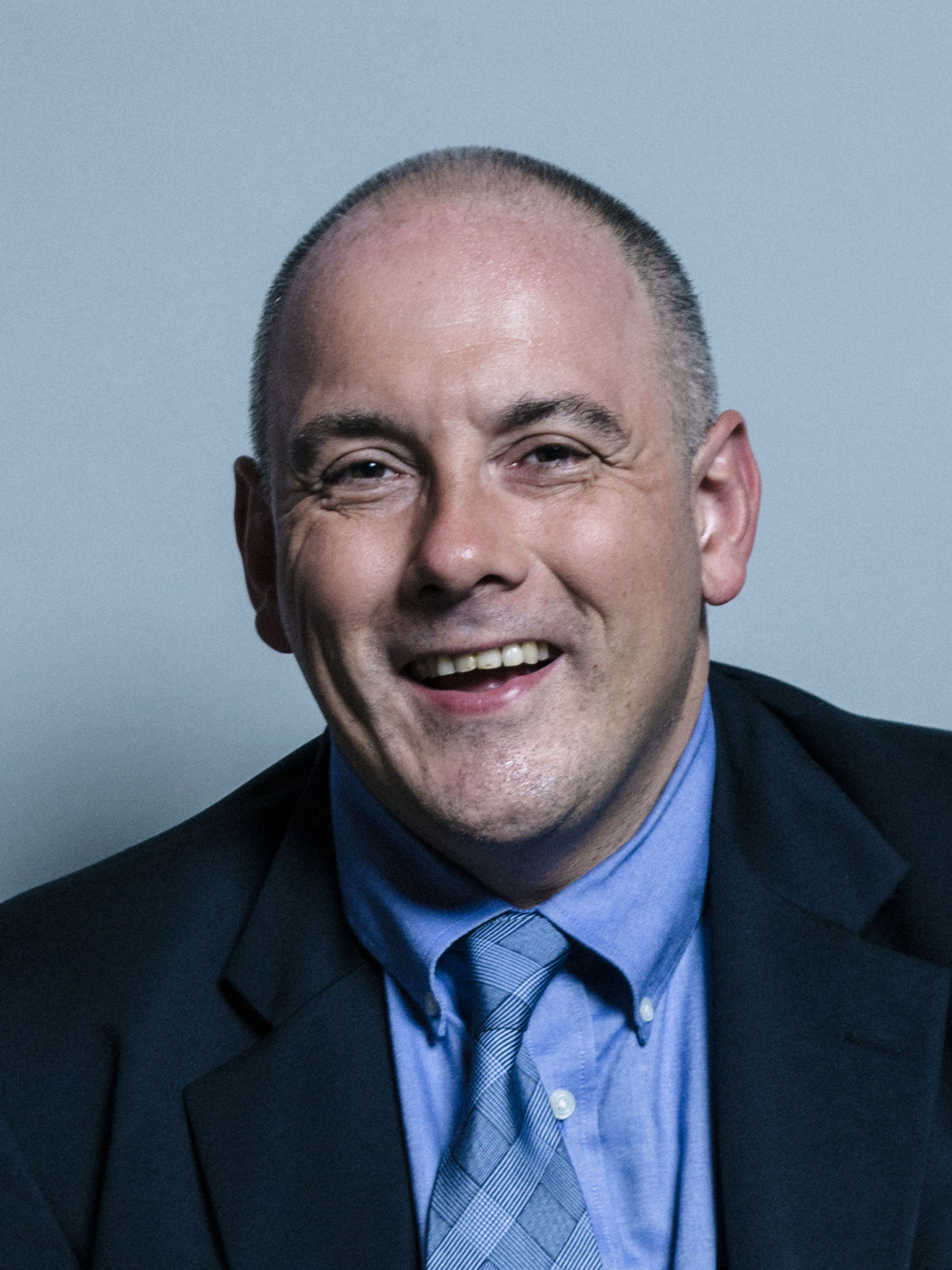
- Official portrait, 2017

Minister of State for Skills, Apprenticeships and Higher Education (Note: Minister of State for Skills (2016–2017))
- In office 26 October 2022 – 26 March 2024
- Prime Minister: Rishi Sunak
- Preceded by: Andrea Jenkyns
- Succeeded by: Luke Hall
- In office 17 July 2016 – 12 June 2017
- Prime Minister: Theresa May
- Preceded by: Nick Boles
- Succeeded by: Anne Milton

Chair of the Education Select Committee
- In office 12 July 2017 – 26 October 2022
- Preceded by: Neil Carmichael
- Succeeded by: Robin Walker

Minister without Portfolio
- In office 11 May 2015 – 17 July 2016
- Prime Minister: David Cameron
- Preceded by: Grant Shapps
- Succeeded by: Brandon Lewis

Deputy Chairman of the Conservative Party
- In office 11 May 2015 – 17 July 2016
- Leader: David Cameron
- Preceded by: Sarah Newton
- Succeeded by: Anthea McIntyre

Member of Parliament for Harlow
- In office 6 May 2010 – 30 May 2024
- Preceded by: Bill Rammell
- Succeeded by: Chris Vince

Personal details
- Born: Robert Henry Halfon; 22 March 1969 (age 57) London, England
- Party: Conservative
- Domestic partner: Vanda Colombo
- Education: University of Exeter
- Website: Official website

Robert Henry Halfon (/ˈhælfɒn/; born 22 March 1969) is a British Conservative Party politician and was the Member of Parliament (MP) for Harlow from 2010 to 2024.

Halfon was formerly a researcher for Conservative MPs, including as Chief of Staff to Shadow Chancellor of the Exchequer Oliver Letwin. He was also the political director of Conservative Friends of Israel. He was elected to the House of Commons as MP for Harlow at the 2010 general election.

Halfon attended Prime Minister David Cameron's Cabinet from May 2015 and July 2016 as Minister without portfolio and Deputy Chairman of the Conservative Party. He served in Prime Minister Theresa May's government as Minister of State for Skills at the Department for Education from July 2016 to June 2017. After returning to the backbenches, Halfon chaired the House of Commons Education Select Committee from July 2017 to October 2022, when he was appointed Minister of State for Skills, Apprenticeships and Higher Education by Prime Minister Rishi Sunak.

== Early life and education ==
Robert Halfon was born in Westminster, London, on 22 March 1969, and grew up in Hampstead. His mother, Jennifer, is of Ashkenazi Jewish descent. His Libyan Jewish father, Clement, is Orthodox and comes from a Sephardic family; he now lives in Israel. Halfon's paternal grandfather, Renato Halfon, was an Italian Jewish clothing manufacturer living in Libya until he was forced to leave in 1968, after which he joined Clement in England.

Halfon was privately educated at Highgate School and then studied at the University of Exeter, graduating with a BA in Politics and an MA in Russian politics and Eastern European politics. Alongside David Burrowes, Sajid Javid, and Tim Montgomerie, he was a leading member of the Exeter University Conservative Association and helped to turn it from social to political activities. In 1991, he took the issue of compulsory membership of the National Union of Students (NUS) to the European Court of Human Rights, which decided that his application was manifestly ill-founded. NUS is a confederate association consisting of students' unions as members, not individual students.

== Political career ==
After graduating, Halfon sold memberships for an upmarket London hotel before he got a job as a part-time researcher for Harold Elletson, the then Conservative MP for Blackpool North. He subsequently worked for other Conservative MPs, including Michael Fabricant. He was Chief of Staff for senior Conservative MP Oliver Letwin before becoming political director for Conservative Friends of Israel. He also spent some time working for a leading London-based Public Affairs company, Market Access.

At the 2001 general election, Halfon stood in Harlow, coming second with 34.8% of the vote behind the incumbent Labour MP Bill Rammell.

Halfon again stood in Harlow at the 2005 general election, again coming second with 41.2% of the vote behind Bill Rammell.

== Parliamentary career ==
At the 2010 general election, Halfon was elected to Parliament as MP for Harlow with 44.9% of the vote and a majority of 4,925. After the election, he was elected to the executive of the 1922 Committee of backbench Conservative MPs. He delivered his maiden speech in the House on 2 June 2010.

Halfon has signed several early day motions in support of NHS funding for homeopathy sponsored by Conservative MP David Tredinnick.

Halfon is a supporter of apprenticeships, and campaigned for a new university technical college to be built in Harlow, which opened in September 2014 as Sir Charles Kao UTC. He set up the Parliamentary Academy, which encourages MPs to employ apprentices in Parliament.

On 18 July 2014, he was chosen by the Chancellor of the Exchequer, George Osborne, to be his Parliamentary Private Secretary.

Halfon was re-elected as MP for Harlow at the 2015 general election with an increased vote share of 48.9% and an increased majority of 8,350.

Between May 2015 and July 2016, Halfon served as Minister without Portfolio (attending Cabinet) and Deputy Chairman of the Conservative Party. From July 2016, he was Minister of State at the Department for Education, before being dismissed on 12 June 2017 by the Prime Minister Theresa May.

Halfon voted for the UK to remain in the EU during the 2016 Brexit referendum, but said after the victory of the leave campaign that he would support leaving in the event of a second referendum: "I've been disgusted at the way the establishment have behaved, and the way certain people in Parliament have behaved in doing everything possible to stop a democratic result." He later voted in favour of triggering Article 50 and for Boris Johnson's Brexit deal.

At the snap 2017 general election, Halfon was again re-elected, with an increased vote share of 54% and a decreased majority of 7,031.

In the House of Commons he sat on the Liaison Committee (Commons) and Education Committee, and has previously sat on the Public Administration Select Committee.

In July 2018, following the deaths of two children while playing on bouncy castles, Halfon called for an "urgent investigation" into the regulation of them. He argued that "there should be a temporary ban on bouncy castles in public areas until we can ensure they are safe". Earlier, in 2016, a seven-year-old girl died after a bouncy castle broke free from its moorings in Halfon's constituency of Harlow.

Halfon was again re-elected at the 2019 general election, with an increased vote share of 63.5% and an increased majority of 14,063.

Halfon does not speak Welsh, but learned a small amount of it in order to speak it in response to a Parliamentary question in January 2020 regarding the steps being taken by the Government Digital Service to ensure services delivered in Wales are provided bilingually.

In October 2020, Halfon was one of five Conservative MPs who broke the whip to vote for a Labour opposition day motion to extend the provision of free school meals during school holidays until Easter 2021.

In November 2021, Halfon introduced a new Ten Minute Rule Bill to prevent future school closures. The Bill, which has the support of the Children's Commissioner for England, a previous Children's Commissioner, and two former Children's Ministers, proposes to reclassify schools and education settings as essential infrastructure alongside power plants, hospitals, and food shops.

On 26 March 2024, Halfon resigned from his ministerial role and announced he would not be standing at the 2024 general election. Halfon had been reselected unanimously in April 2023.

== Campaigns ==
=== Cost of living ===
After becoming an MP, Halfon founded the Petrol Promise campaign, an online website and petition calling for lower fuel tax and an official inquiry into the oil market due to the suspected manipulation of petrol prices. He is a supporter of the FairFuelUK pressure group, and has raised the issue of cheaper petrol in Parliament. He also presented a petition calling for an inquiry into price-fixing at the Office of Fair Trading, signed by 30,000 motorists in 2013. This led to Chancellor George Osborne calling him a "champion of the people he represents". He won The Spectator's Campaigner of the Year Award in 2013 for his work fighting to keep petrol duty low.

Halfon has campaigned against privatised utility companies making excessive profits. In 2013, he published a study of water companies in East Anglia examining their profits and called for an inquiry. He has called for a windfall tax to be imposed on energy companies who are found to be unnecessarily putting up prices to customers.

Halfon has also campaigned for reducing the tax rate on low-paid workers, arguing in 2013 that a near living wage could be achieved if the government reintroduced the 10p band of income tax or increased the National Insurance threshold, citing this as an alternative to the living wage which he said could damage small local businesses.

=== Israel and Judaism ===
On 19 July 2010, he hosted the launch of the Friends of Israel Initiative at the House of Commons.

Halfon has said that one of the three things that motivate him in politics is "unashamed support for the State of Israel, as the only real democracy and progressive force in the Middle East". He said, "I have always been very supportive of Israel. I have been to Israel many times for work and family, especially now that my father, who has become more Orthodox, lives in Jerusalem. I talk a lot about Israel in the House of Commons."

He attempted to get Muslim Engagement and Development (MEND), formerly iENGAGE, banned from the House of Commons in 2011. He has also campaigned against Libyan funding of British universities, prompted by the experiences of his Italian-Jewish refugee grandfather Renato Halfon, who was making a living in Libya before being expelled alongside other Jews. Halfon is also concerned about donations from Muslim countries to the University of Oxford, Saudi Arabian donations to the University of Cambridge and links to Iran demonstrated by the University of Edinburgh and Durham University.

Halfon is vice president of the Jewish Leadership Council. According to Doreen Wachmann of the Jewish Telegraph, he is the Conservative Party's counterpart to Labour MP Louise Ellman, who she said is "never scared to openly proclaim her Jewish identity and fight for Israel and against Islamic extremism at every Parliamentary opportunity".

=== LGBT issues ===
Halfon voted against the Marriage (Same Sex Couples) Act 2013, which permitted same-sex couples to marry, and much of the secondary legislation implementing the Act. In 2019, he apologised for this and said, "I regret it and I would vote for equal marriage if it came before Parliament now." Later that year, he voted in support of same-sex marriage for residents of Northern Ireland.

=== Trade unions ===
Halfon is a member of the Prospect trade union and a campaigner for Conservative supporters to become more involved in trade unions. In 2012, he published a pamphlet through the thinktank Demos called Stop the Union Bashing: Why Conservatives Should Embrace the Trade Union Movement, which relayed the history of trade unionism in the Conservative Party and called for these links to be revived. He is the honorary president of Conservative Workers & Trade Unionists, an affiliated group of the Conservative Party.

== Controversies ==
In March 2014, Halfon was challenged in Parliament over money paid to his constituency office by a close associate of a Ukrainian magnate, Dmitry Firtash, who had been recently arrested amid allegations of bribery. Firtash's close associate Robert Shetler-Jones, a Briton who was the former CEO of the Ukrainian's business empire Group and was currently deputy chairman of the group's supervisory council had donated £35,000 to Halfon's constituency office. Halfon rejected the accusations of connections with Firtash and said that he had fully declared the money in the Register of Members' Interests.

Halfon admitted in 2015 that he had an affair with the then-chair of Conservative Future, Alexandra Paterson, from 2010 to 2014. He admitted to the affair after he was warned that a Conservative aide was trying to blackmail him over it; he alleged that the controversial former Conservative Parliamentary candidate Mark Clarke, dubbed the "Tatler Tory", was attempting to blackmail him to further Clarke's advancement within the party. Halfon was further criticised after The Guardian reported that he had claimed over £30,000 in expenses to illicitly meet Paterson when staying at the East India Club in London. His spokeswoman responded that Paterson had not actually stayed at the club for the whole of the nights in question. Halfon was again criticised for having his legal bills of £6,043 paid by Conservative-supporting law firms, despite having previously voted to cut legal aid.

In April 2020, Halfon accused the Board of Deputies of British Jews of having a "left-of-centre political agenda" and complained that the Board had failed to "wish Prime Minister Boris Johnson a good recovery" from his COVID-19 infection in its latest weekly email. The Board described him as "surprisingly ignorant, disingenuous, and outright false" and stated, "Bizarrely, [Halfon] falsely alleges that we did not wish the Prime Minister well over his recent illness when, in fact, we released two messages of support, which were widely covered in the Jewish Chronicle and other Jewish media. [Halfon] also falsely alleges that we did not share a Passover message from the Conservative Party when we did in fact share the Downing Street message as well as sharing the Prime Minister's Chanukah video." Board president Marie van der Zyl said, "Despite contacting [Halfon] via his mobile, his office number, his email and via social media—requesting times where he might be available to speak—he has still not spoken to me, which does bring into question his courage and integrity."

== Personal life ==
Halfon's Brazilian wife, Vanda Colombo, converted to Judaism before they married.

Halfon was born with a moderate form of cerebral palsy called spastic diplegia and underwent several major operations as a child, causing an onset of osteoarthritis in his early 30s, and now uses crutches to walk.

== Notes ==
Parliament of the United Kingdom
Preceded by Bill Rammell	Member of Parliament for Harlow; 2010–2024	Succeeded by Chris Vince
Political offices
Preceded by Grant Shapps	Minister without Portfolio; 2015–2016	Vacant
