= Harlow (constituency) =

UK Parliament constituency (since 1974)

Coordinates: 51.77°N 0.09°E

- County constituency for the House of Commons
- Interactive map of boundaries since 2024
- Location within the East of England
- County: Essex
- Electorate: 73,479 (March 2020)
- Major settlements: Harlow, Roydon

Current constituency
- Created: 1974
- Member of Parliament: Chris Vince (Labour Co-op)
- Seats: One
- Created from: Epping

Harlow is a constituency (Note: A county constituency (for the purposes of election expenses and type of returning officer)) represented in the House of Commons of the UK Parliament since 2024 by Chris Vince, of the Labour and Co-operative Party. (Note: As with all constituencies, the constituency elects one Member of Parliament (MP) by the first past the post system of election at least every five years.)

== Constituency profile ==
The Harlow constituency is located in Essex. It covers the large town of Harlow and the rural areas and villages surrounding it, including Lower Nazeing, Sheering and Hatfield Heath. Harlow was a small town until 1947, when it was designated as a new town to accommodate the London overspill. There is some deprivation in Harlow whilst the rural parts of the constituency are wealthier. House prices are similar to the rest of the East of England and higher than the national average.

In general, residents of Harlow have low levels of education, and household income is similar to the national average. They are less likely to work in professional occupations compared to the rest of the country, and a high proportion of residents work in the retail and health industries. White people made up 84% of the population at the 2021 census, a similar proportion to the country as a whole. Black and Asian people made up 5% each. At the local council level, the centre of Harlow is mostly represented by the Labour Party whilst the suburban and rural areas primarily elected Conservatives. Voters in Harlow showed strong support for leaving the European Union in the 2016 referendum; an estimated 67% voted in favour of Brexit, making Harlow one of the top 50 most Brexit-supporting constituencies out of 650 nationwide.

== History ==
This seat was created for the February 1974 general election from the abolished seat of Epping, and has been subject only to minor changes since.

== Boundaries ==
=== Historic ===
==== 1974–1983 ====
- Harlow Urban District
- Epping and Ongar Rural District parishes of Magdalen Laver, Matching, Nazeing, North Weald Bassett, Roydon, and Sheering.

==== 1983–1997 ====
- The District of Harlow;
- The District of Epping Forest wards of Nazeing, North Weald Bassett, Roydon, and Sheering.

Minor loss to Brentwood and Ongar.

==== 1997–2010 ====
- The District of Harlow;
- The District of Epping Forest wards of Nazeing, Roydon, and Sheering.

North Weald Bassett transferred to Epping Forest.

Map of boundaries 2010–2024

==== 2010–2024 ====
- The District of Harlow;
- The District of Epping Forest wards of Hastingwood, Matching and Sheering Village, Lower Nazeing, Lower Sheering, and Roydon.

Marginal changes due to redistribution of local authority wards.

=== Current ===
Further to the 2023 review of Westminster constituencies, which came into effect for the 2024 general election, the composition of the constituency was expanded northwards to meet the electorate size requirements, with the transfer in from Saffron Walden of the two District of Uttlesford wards of Broad Oak & the Hallingburys, and Hatfield Heath.

Following a local government boundary review in Epping Forest which came into effect in May 2024, the constituency now comprises the following from the 2024 general election:

- The District of Epping Forest part wards of: North Weald Bassett (small part); Roydon & Lower Nazeing (bulk); Rural East (parishes of Matching and Sheering).
- The District of Harlow.
- The District of Uttlesford wards of: Broad Oak & the Hallingburys; Hatfield Heath.

== Members of Parliament ==
Epping prior to 1974

Election	Member	Party
Feb 1974	Stan Newens	Labour Co-op
1983	Jerry Hayes	Conservative
1997	Bill Rammell	Labour
2010	Robert Halfon	Conservative
2024	Chris Vince	Labour Co-op

== Elections ==
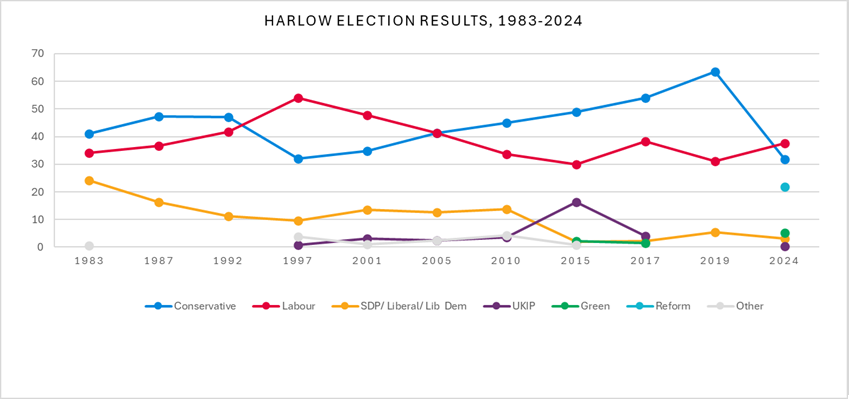
Harlow election results 1983-2024

=== Elections in the 2020s ===
General election 2024: Harlow
Party	Candidate	Votes	%	±%
Labour Co-op	Chris Vince	16,313	37.6	+8.3
Conservative	Hannah Ellis	13,809	31.8	−32.8
Reform	Malcolm Featherstone	9,461	21.8	N/A
Green	Yasmin Gregory	2,267	5.2	+4.9
Liberal Democrats	Riad Mannan	1,350	3.1	−2.8
UKIP	Lois Perry (Note: Perry resigned her membership of UKIP during the campaign, but remained listed as the party's candidate on the ballot paper due to this happening after the close of nominations.)	157	0.4	N/A
Majority		2,504	5.8	N/A
Turnout		43,357	58.2	–6.3
Registered electors		74,683		
Labour gain from Conservative		Swing	▲20.6	

=== Elections in the 2010s ===
2019 notional result
Party	Vote	%
Conservative	30,573	64.6
Labour	13,879	29.3
Liberal Democrats	2,783	5.9
Green	125	0.3
Turnout	47,360	64.5
Electorate	73,479	

General election 2019: Harlow
Party	Candidate	Votes	%	±%
Conservative	Robert Halfon	27,510	63.5	+9.5
Labour	Laura McAlpine	13,447	31.0	−7.3
Liberal Democrats	Charlotte Cane	2,397	5.5	+3.3
Majority		14,063	32.5	+16.8
Turnout		43,354	63.7	−2.5
Conservative hold		Swing	+8.4	

General election 2017: Harlow
Party	Candidate	Votes	%	±%
Conservative	Robert Halfon	24,230	54.0	+5.1
Labour	Phil Waite	17,199	38.3	+8.3
UKIP	Mark Gough	1,787	4.0	−12.3
Liberal Democrats	Geoffrey Seef	970	2.2	+0.2
Green	Hannah Clare	660	1.5	−0.7
Majority		7,031	15.7	−3.2
Turnout		44,846	66.2	+1.1
Conservative hold		Swing	−1.6	

General election 2015: Harlow
Party	Candidate	Votes	%	±%
Conservative	Robert Halfon	21,623	48.9	+4.0
Labour	Suzy Stride	13,273	30.0	−3.7
UKIP	Sam Stopplecamp	7,208	16.3	+12.7
Green	Murray Sackwild	954	2.2	N/A
Liberal Democrats	Geoffrey Seeff	904	2.0	−11.7
TUSC	David Brown	174	0.4	N/A
English Democrat	Eddy Butler	115	0.3	N/A
Majority		8,350	18.9	+7.7
Turnout		44,251	65.1	±0.0
Conservative hold		Swing	+3.9	

General election 2010: Harlow
Party	Candidate	Votes	%	±%
Conservative	Robert Halfon	19,691	44.9	+4.1
Labour	Bill Rammell	14,766	33.7	−7.7
Liberal Democrats	David White	5,990	13.7	+0.7
BNP	Eddy Butler	1,739	4.0	N/A
UKIP	John Croft	1,591	3.6	+1.1
Christian	Oluyemi Adeeko	101	0.2	N/A
Majority		4,925	11.2	N/A
Turnout		43,878	65.1	+2.7
Conservative gain from Labour		Swing	+5.9	

=== Elections in the 2000s ===
General election 2005: Harlow
Party	Candidate	Votes	%	±%
Labour	Bill Rammell	16,453	41.4	−6.4
Conservative	Robert Halfon	16,356	41.2	+6.4
Liberal Democrats	Lorna Spenceley	5,002	12.6	−0.8
UKIP	John Felgate	981	2.5	−0.5
Veritas	Anthony Bennett	941	2.4	N/A
Majority		97	0.2	−12.8
Turnout		39,733	62.6	+2.9
Labour hold		Swing	−6.4	

General election 2001: Harlow
Party	Candidate	Votes	%	±%
Labour	Bill Rammell	19,169	47.8	−6.3
Conservative	Robert Halfon	13,941	34.8	+2.7
Liberal Democrats	Lorna Spenceley	5,381	13.4	+3.9
UKIP	Tony Bennett	1,223	3.0	+2.3
Socialist Alliance	John Hobbs	401	1.0	N/A
Majority		5,228	13.0	−9.0
Turnout		40,115	59.7	−14.6
Labour hold		Swing	−4.5	

=== Elections in the 1990s ===
General election 1997: Harlow
Party	Candidate	Votes	%	±%
Labour	Bill Rammell	25,861	54.1	+12.3
Conservative	Jerry Hayes	15,347	32.1	−14.9
Liberal Democrats	Lorna Spenceley	4,523	9.5	−1.8
Referendum	Mark Wells	1,422	3.0	N/A
UKIP	Gerard Batten	340	0.7	N/A
BNP	John Bowles	319	0.7	N/A
Majority		10,514	22.0	N/A
Turnout		47,812	74.3	−8.3
Labour gain from Conservative		Swing	+13.6	

General election 1992: Harlow
Party	Candidate	Votes	%	±%
Conservative	Jerry Hayes	26,608	47.0	−0.2
Labour	Bill Rammell	23,668	41.8	+5.2
Liberal Democrats	Lorna Spenceley	6,375	11.3	−4.9
Majority		2,940	5.2	−5.5
Turnout		56,651	82.6	+8.5
Conservative hold		Swing	−2.7	

=== Elections in the 1980s ===
General election 1987: Harlow
Party	Candidate	Votes	%	±%
Conservative	Jerry Hayes	26,017	47.2	+6.1
Labour Co-op	Stanley Newens	20,140	36.6	+2.4
SDP (Alliance)	Monica Eden-Green	8,915	16.2	−8.0
Majority		5,877	10.7	+3.8
Turnout		55,072	74.1	−2.4
Conservative hold		Swing	+1.9	

General election 1983: Harlow
Party	Candidate	Votes	%	±%
Conservative	Jerry Hayes	21,924	41.1	+1.0
Labour Co-op	Stanley Newens	18,250	34.2	−8.5
Liberal (Alliance)	John Bastick	12,891	24.2	+8.6
Independent	John Ward	256	0.5	N/A
Majority		3,674	6.9	N/A
Turnout		53,321	76.5	−2.2
Conservative gain from Labour Co-op		Swing	+4.8	

=== Elections in the 1970s ===
General election 1979: Harlow
Party	Candidate	Votes	%	±%
Labour Co-op	Stanley Newens	22,698	42.7	−10.0
Conservative	John Powley	21,306	40.1	+15.8
Liberal	Robert Browne	8,289	15.6	−7.4
National Front	J Childs	840	1.6	N/a
Majority		1,392	2.6	–25.8
Turnout		53,133	78.7	+3.5
Labour Co-op hold		Swing	−12.9	

General election October 1974: Harlow
Party	Candidate	Votes	%	±%
Labour Co-op	Stanley Newens	24,961	52.7	+3.2
Conservative	James Emerton Smith	11,510	24.3	−0.7
Liberal	Basil Goldstone	10,869	23.0	−2.5
Majority		13,451	28.4	+4.4
Turnout		47,340	75.2	−8.7
Labour Co-op hold		Swing	+2.0	

General election February 1974: Harlow
Party	Candidate	Votes	%	±%
Labour Co-op	Stanley Newens	25,814	49.5	−11.4
Liberal	Basil Goldstone	13,280	25.5	+25.5
Conservative	James Emerton Smith	13,016	25.0	−14.1
Majority		12,534	24.0	+2.2
Turnout		52,110	83.9	+10.0
Labour Co-op win (new seat)				

1970 notional result
Party	Vote	%
Labour	29,453	60.9
Conservative	18,880	39.1
Turnout	48,333	72.9
Electorate	58,512	

Preceded by Epping	UK Parliament constituency 1974–	Succeeded by Current Incumbent

== Graphical representation ==
February 1974 New Seat
49.5%	25.5%	25.0%
Labour	Liberal	Conservative

October 1974
52.7%	23.0%	24.3%
Labour	Liberal	Conservative

1979
42.7%	15.7%	40.1%
Labour	Liberal	Conservative

1983
34.2%	24.2%	41.1%
Labour	Liberal	Conservative

1987
36.6%	16.2%	47.2%
Labour	SDP	Conservative

1992
41.8%	11.3%	47.0%
Labour	Lib Dems	Conservative

1997
54.1%	9.5%	32.1%	3.0%
Labour	Lib Dems	Conservative	Ref

2001
47.8%	13.4%	34.8%	3.0%
Labour	Lib Dems	Conservative	UKIP

2005
41.4%	12.6%	41.2%
Labour	Lib Dems	Conservative

2010
33.7%	13.7%	44.9%	3.6%	4.0%
Labour	Lib Dems	Conservative	UKIP	BNP

2015
30.0%	48.9%	16.3%
Labour	Conservative	UKIP

2017
38.4%	54.0%	4.0%
Labour	Conservative	UKIP

2019
31.0%	5.5%	63.5%
Labour	LD	Conservative

2024
5.2%	37.6%	31.9%	21.8%
Green	Labour	Conservative	Reform

== See also ==
- List of parliamentary constituencies in Essex
