= Lea Manor High School =

Lea Manor

Location
- Northwell Drive; Luton, Bedfordshire, LU3 3TL; England; 51.9162°N 0.4488°W

Information
- Type: Academy
- Established: 1974
- Local authority: Luton Borough Council
- Trust: Chiltern Learning Trust
- Department for Education URN: 149208 Tables
- Ofsted: Reports
- Head teacher: Jessantha Pather
- Gender: Coeducational
- Age: 11 to 16
- Enrolment: 1,010 as of July 2023
- Website: https://www.leamanorhighschool.org/

Lea Manor High School is a coeducational secondary school located in Luton, Bedfordshire, England.

== History ==
Lea Manor High School opened in 1974.

It became a specialised Performing Arts college in 2007.

Lea Manor High School is underwent building and refurbishing work under the government's Building Schools for the Future Programme (BSF) and was one of the first schools in Luton to be transformed. The building firm Wates Group won the contract to rebuild or remodel every secondary school in Luton. Phase one of the remodelling was completed and opened to students in Autumn 2009. This phase included technology rooms and three new science laboratories.

In April 2010, the first section of phase two opened which included a Science 'Heart Space' with six laboratories leading off from it. The space is used as a flexible teaching area and has new Apple Inc. iMacs, interactive whiteboards and a plasma TV. In May 2010, the Adult Education facilities relocated from the existing building to its brand new area in the new school.

Due to delays, the second part of phase two of the remodelling opened later than planned. This saw the opening of Lea Manor's newly constructed entrance, dining facilities, community theatre, music studios and drama rooms.

Previously a foundation school administered by Luton Borough Council, in August 2023 Lea manor High School converted to academy status. The school is now sponsored by the Chiltern Learning Trust.

== Notable alumni ==
- Andrew Tate
- Tristan Tate
- Sarfraz Manzoor

== Gallery ==
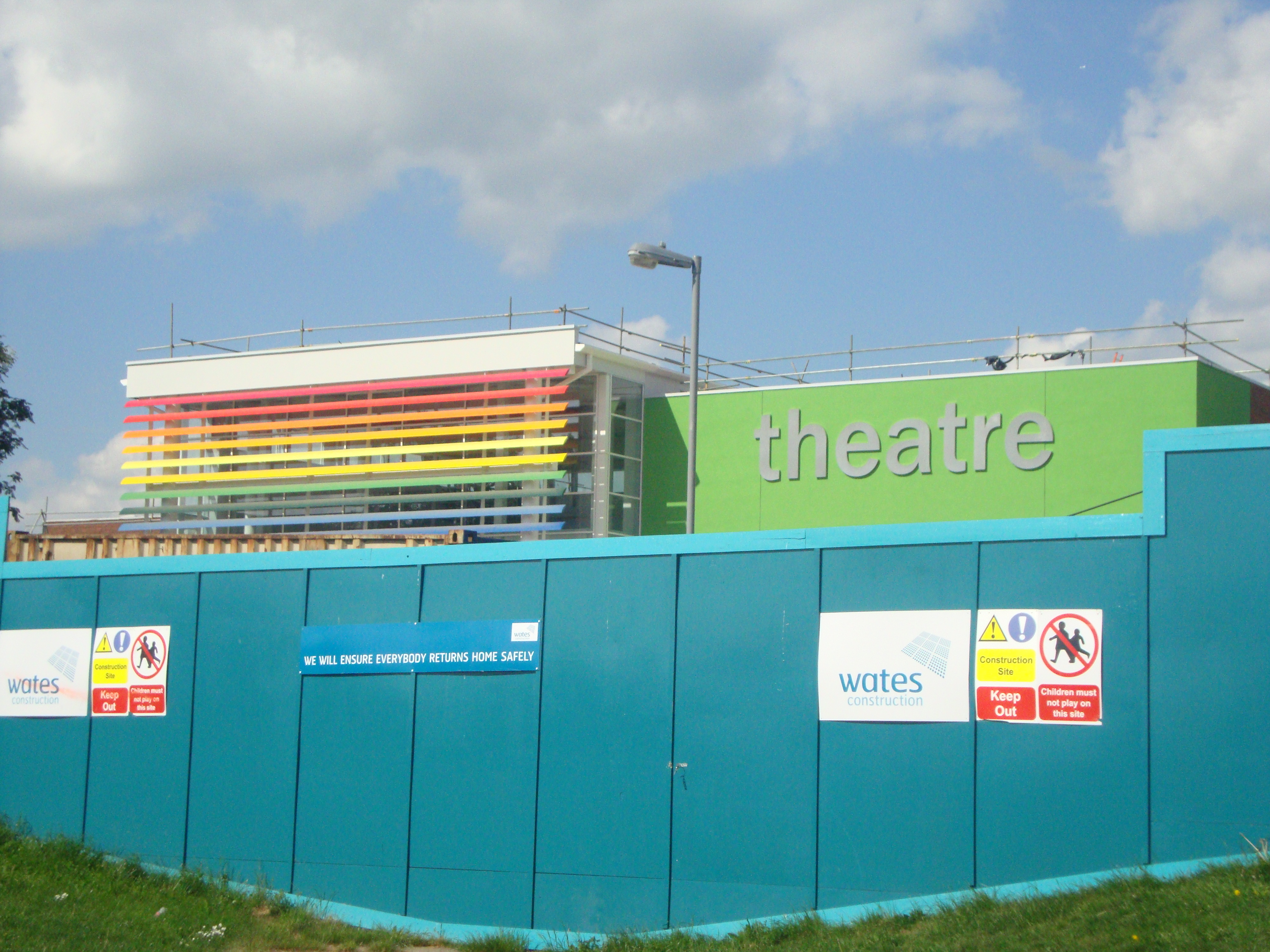
The front of Lea Manor High School which was under construction. It is now complete

== School Website ==
- School website
