= Jerry Hayes =

British politician

Member of Parliament for Harlow
- In office 9 June 1983 – 8 April 1997
- Preceded by: Stan Newens
- Succeeded by: Bill Rammell

Personal details
- Born: 20 April 1953 (age 73)
- Party: Conservative
- Spouse: Alison Hayes
- Children: 2
- Occupation: Barrister

Jeremy Joseph James Hayes (born 20 April 1953) is a British barrister and former Conservative politician, who was the MP for Harlow in Essex from 1983 until he lost his seat in 1997. He subsequently returned to practising criminal law.

== Early life ==
Hayes' father was in the Merchant Navy during World War II. Hayes grew up in Epping and was educated at the London Oratory School in Fulham.

== Political career ==
Hayes was selected as the Conservative candidate for Harlow in Essex in 1981. He was Member of Parliament for Harlow from 1983. He served on the Health and Heritage Select committees and was a Parliamentary Private Secretary in the Northern Ireland Office and the Department of Environment. He introduced a number of Acts including the Sexual Offences Act, the Nurse Prescribing Act and the Video Recordings Act. Hayes lost his seat to Bill Rammell, the Labour Party candidate, in the 1997 general election.

=== Views ===
Hayes was on the left on the Conservative Party, unlike most of the 1983 intake of Conservative MPs. Hayes opposed capital punishment and fought for free dental and eye check-ups. On his blog, Hayes wrote, "I'm on the independent left of the Conservative Party. During the Thatcher years I was regarded as a rebel. Heaven knows why, I just believed in social justice and pragmatism. But in those days that was about as popular as a rat sandwich." Once, when asked why he did not support Blair's New Labour endeavour, he replied "They're too right-wing". On the BBC Question Time programme on 9 May 2013, he expressed the view that there was a real danger that the entire legal profession would be placed in the hands of G4S within a couple of years.

=== Image ===
Roth's Parliamentary Profiles says of Hayes: "[He] has never taken himself seriously, and therefore has not been taken seriously by others." Betty Boothroyd, former Speaker of the House of Commons, said of Hayes that "he would look very pretty as a French maid; I wish I had his curls." Prime Minister Margaret Thatcher personally disliked his beard and yellow ties, which he refused to change, when asked.

Hayes was a regular contributor on television quiz shows and talk shows, in particular, The James Whale Show. For over four years he regularly appeared with Charles Kennedy, Ken Livingstone and Michael Parkinson on a political discussion show on LBC in London. Hayes appeared on comedy show Have I Got News for You in 1992, on which he was unafraid to ridicule his own party and it was revealed that he was Ken Livingstone's "favourite Tory". Hayes was frequently described as a "political buffoon", because of his willingness to subject himself to ridicule on various television and radio appearances. This included being fastened in the stocks and pelted with custard pies, and being whipped while dressed in fetish clothing.

When the heavy metal group Iron Maiden were having trouble getting permission to play in Beirut, Hayes threw his weight behind them (one member was a constituent). "I have advised [the Foreign Office] the group is not a bad influence," he said. "In fact they are very good: I have all their albums."

== After Parliament ==
Following his career in Parliament, he wrote for the magazine Punch. In May 2010, Hayes started a political blog for the website "Think Politics", which also hosts blogs by former Liberal Democrat MP for Falmouth Camborne, Julia Goldsworthy, former Labour MP for Denton and Reddish, Andrew Gwynne, and Conservative candidate for Swansea West, René Kinzett. His blog has now moved to Total Politics. Hayes also became a panelist on Stephen Nolan's weekend late night show on Fridays on BBC Radio 5 Live, reviewing the newspapers with Mohammed Shafiq, a media commentator on British-Muslim issues.

== Legal career ==
Hayes was called to the Bar by the Middle Temple in 1977. Hayes has practised as lead defence counsel in high-profile cases, including R v McGing and R v Tishane Bernard. McGing was a soldier in Basra accused of drowning a teenager whilst on patrol. He was acquitted. Tishane Bernard was accused of a gangland execution, and was also acquitted. He was instrumental in setting up Ten 17 radio with Tony Saxby and Russ Lewell in 1991. He acted as lawyer to John Hemming in his 2005 legal bid to challenge postal votes at the 2005 general election and has also defended celebrities and a British soldier in Iraq. Hayes also represented two Labour councillors accused of postal ballot fraud in Birmingham.

Hayes works at Goldsmith Chambers on whose website he is described as specialising in leading high-profile murder, drugs, rape and fraud cases. He discontinued the rape prosecution of Liam Allan in December 2017 after it was discovered that the police had withheld tens of thousands of text messages sent by the complainant.

== Personal life ==
Hayes is married to Alison and has two children.

In January 1997, the News of the World reported that in 1991, Hayes began an affair with an 18-year-old male Conservative researcher which lasted for over a year. Hayes denied any sexual component to their relationship and said they were only friends. The decision to report the story drew criticism from other newspapers, with Peter Popham writing in The Independent, "One has to ask why Jerry Hayes's gay fling/platonic friendship should be thought to have any bearing on anything besides the emotions of those two people and, arguably, those close to them".

He is a member of the Savile Club.
