= Dami Olonisakin =

British-Nigerian sex educator (born 1990)

- Born: 6 August 1990 (age 36)
- Other name: Oloni
- Education: University of Bedfordshire
- Occupations: Sex educator, blogger, podcaster, media personality
- Website: Official website

Dami "Oloni" Olonisakin (born 6 August 1990) is a British Nigerian sex educator and relationship advisor. She runs the blog Simply Oloni and a podcast. Olonisakin was included on OkayAfrica's 100 Women list.

== Biography ==
Olonisakin has lived in the United Kingdom. She was raised in a Nigerian and Christian household. She has one younger sister, Temi Olonisakin. As a child, she did not receive comprehensive sex education. Oloni earned a bachelor's degree in journalism with honours from the University of Bedfordshire.

== Media work ==
=== Simply Oloni blog ===
Olonisakin started the blog Simply Oloni in 2008. She wrote her first blog posts at the age of 18, in response to a sermon that opposed abortion. She said:

I was just like, you know, surely this message isn't right. Surely they should be teaching us if you do want to have sex, these are ways you can do it responsibly... And I think that's when it started to hit me, I really wanted to talk about the rights that women have.

— Dami Olonisakin, New Statesman interview

Originally, she simply wrote about her and her friends' dating lives. When she started responding to her readers on her blog, that "was practically the birth of [her] platform". Her readers' questions are anonymous. Some of her answers are short, while others are turned into full articles. Simply Oloni addresses a variety of topics, including sexual consent, dating, STIs, abortion, sexual assault, and female orgasms. The blog is sex-positive.

Olonisakin aimed to fill a gap in the sex and relationship advice market on Black women's sexuality. She said: "I felt the culture of dating and hook-up culture for a black woman and a white woman were different. Black women were being quiet about sex but it didn't mean we weren’t having it." She has spoken about racism in the UK sex industry.

=== Other work ===
Oloni has a Twitter account. She encourages women to share their experiences, starting with the catchphrase "Ladies". She runs the podcast Laid Bare, where she and guests talk about their own sexual encounters, advise their listeners, and discuss current events. They encourage women to enjoy sex. The listeners are mostly women of color. Oloni gives relationship advice on the BBC Three show My Mate's a Bad Date. The show focuses on helping bad daters improve.

Oloni has given sex education workshops in secondary schools with a focus on consent.

== Awards and recognition ==
Olonisakin's blog Simply Oloni won the 2015 Sex & Relationships Cosmopolitan Blog Award. For the show My Mate's a Bad Date, Oloni won the 2020 Royal Television Society Midlands Awards for Breakthrough (On Screen) and On Screen Personality. She was on OkayAfrica's 2019 100 Women list, and featured as a Girl's Champion by BBC 100 Women.
