= Unspeakable: The Autobiography =

2020 memoir by John Bercow

- First edition
- Author: John Bercow
- Language: English
- Genre: Memoir
- Published: 6 February 2020
- Publisher: Weidenfeld & Nicolson
- Publication place: United Kingdom
- Pages: 464

Unspeakable: The Autobiography is a memoir by the former House of Commons Speaker John Bercow, published by Weidenfeld & Nicolson, on 6 February 2020. It gives an insight as his life as Speaker of the House of Commons and his verdict on British politics.

== Critical reception ==
In the book, Bercow named some of those Members of Parliament who had accused of him of bullying. House of Commons staff responded that in the context those MP's had a "right to expect" privacy.
