= Rebecca Bunting =

British academic

Rebecca Bunting is a linguist and the former Vice-Chancellor of the University of Bedfordshire. She held the office from January 2020 until December 2025.

She was previously the Vice-Chancellor of Buckinghamshire New University.

== Professional experience ==
Leadership in HE [VC, DVC, PVC, Dean]; Project leadership for language and linguistics [Tempus, DfE]; Director of the Higher Education Academy; Director and Vice-Chair, Society for Research into Higher Education to 2013; HEFCE Teaching Excellence and Student Opportunity Committee; Director, Imperial Health Partners; Board member Bucks Business First.

== Publications ==
- Teaching about Language in the Primary Years. Routledge, Fulton. 1997. ISBN 1853464228. OCLC 37162862.
