= University of Bedfordshire =

University in Luton, England

- Type: Public
- Established: 1882 – Bedford Teacher Training College; 1993 – University of Luton gained University Status; 2006 – renamed to University of Bedfordshire after merging with the Bedford campus of De Montfort University
- Affiliations: MillionPlus
- Chancellor: Sarfraz Manzoor
- Vice-Chancellor: Deborah Johnston
- Students: 16,725 (2024/25)
- Undergraduates: 13,155 (2024/25)
- Postgraduates: 3,575 (2024/25)
- Location: Bedford, Luton, Aylesbury and Milton Keynes, Bedfordshire and Buckinghamshire, United Kingdom; 51°52′40″N 0°24′41″W
- Campus: Urban
- Website: beds.ac.uk

The University of Bedfordshire is a public research university with campuses in Bedfordshire and Buckinghamshire, England. The university has roots in further and higher education from 1882: it gained university status in 1993 as the University of Luton. The university changed its name to the University of Bedfordshire in 2006, following the merger of the University of Luton with the Bedford campus of De Montfort University.

It is spread across five campuses: there are three in Bedfordshire, in Bedford and Luton; and two in Buckinghamshire, in Aylesbury (for students studying Nursing and Midwifery), and in Milton Keynes. It is also active in London and Birmingham, as well as globally, with a growing portfolio of international partnerships as far afield as Trinidad and Tobago, Egypt, Vietnam, Oman and Mauritius.

The university has around 20,000 students from over 100 countries, with around 40 academic partners, both in the UK and overseas, to deliver a range of course from foundation degrees to doctorates. More than 40% of its student population come from families with no history of participation in higher education. Around 70% are mature returners to education and over half are from black or ethnic minority backgrounds.

The current Chancellor is British journalist and author Sarfraz Manzoor.

== History ==
The University of Luton had its roots in the Luton Modern School, which was established in 1908 and the Luton Modern School and Technical Institute which opened in 1937. This became Luton College of Higher Education following the merger of Luton College of Technology and Putteridge Bury College of Education, in 1976. It obtained university status in 1993.

The Bedford campus of De Montfort University was originally part of the Bedford College of Higher Education, which stemmed from Bedford Teacher Training College, founded in 1882, and Bedford Physical Training College, founded in 1903. The university was created by the merger of the University of Luton and the Bedford campus of De Montfort University in August 2006, following approval by the Privy Council.

In 2012, it achieved FairTrade status. The university has also come eighth in the UK in the People and Planet University Green League in 2019 and received the Eco Campus Platinum award in 2020.

== Campuses ==
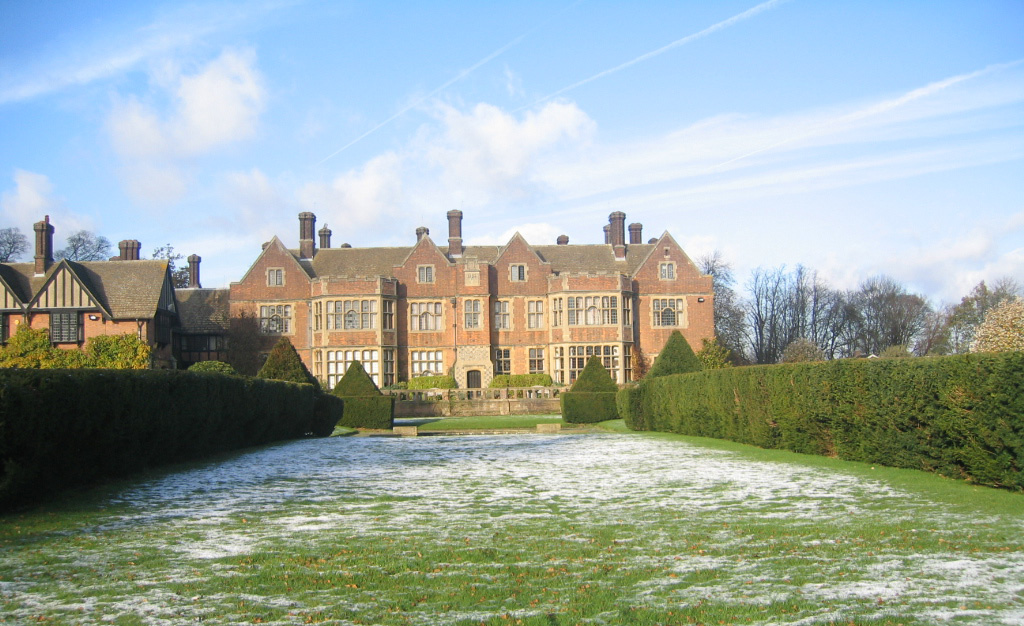
Putteridge Bury

The university's two main campuses are in Luton and Bedford. In Buckinghamshire, the dedicated Mary Seacole Aylesbury campus for Healthcare students opened in February 2020 at Stoke Mandeville Hospital, in partnership with Buckinghamshire Healthcare NHS Trust (BHT). A smaller fourth campus at Milton Keynes became part of the university in 2012, offering a variety of degree courses as well as Continuing Professional Development (CPD) programmes.

On the outskirts of Luton, is the university's Putteridge Bury campus. The campus is situated in approximately 30 acres of landscaped gardens. The current building was completed in 1911 and was designed by architects Sir Ernest George and Alfred Yeats in the style of Chequers, having had various redesigns and rebuilds over the years.

The site is utilised for University events including graduations, academic research symposia and seminars, The University of Bedfordshire Business School's postgraduate programmes, as well as a wide variety of public and private events including conferences, weddings, funeral receptions and public holiday functions.

=== Luton Campus ===
The university's Luton campus is located in the town centre and is home to a purpose-built STEM building, seven-storey library, a Postgraduate & CPD Centre, as well as facilities to support each of the courses on offer. These include the Media Arts Centre, a Moot Court, Business Pods, Healthcare Simulation Suites, a Campus Gym and a three-storey art studio with designated fashion and photography studios.

The university's Campus Centre, at Luton, opened in October 2010. It houses a 240-seat lecture theatre, an exhibition area for displaying student work, a Student Information Desk and Students' Union support services.

The Postgraduate and Continuing Professional Development Centre was completed in early 2013

The dedicated STEM building opened in 2019 and is set out over four storeys of teaching space including four computer laboratories and workshops for subjects such as automotive engineering, cyber-security and robotics, along with three large teaching labs, and four specialist containment labs.

=== Bedford Campus ===
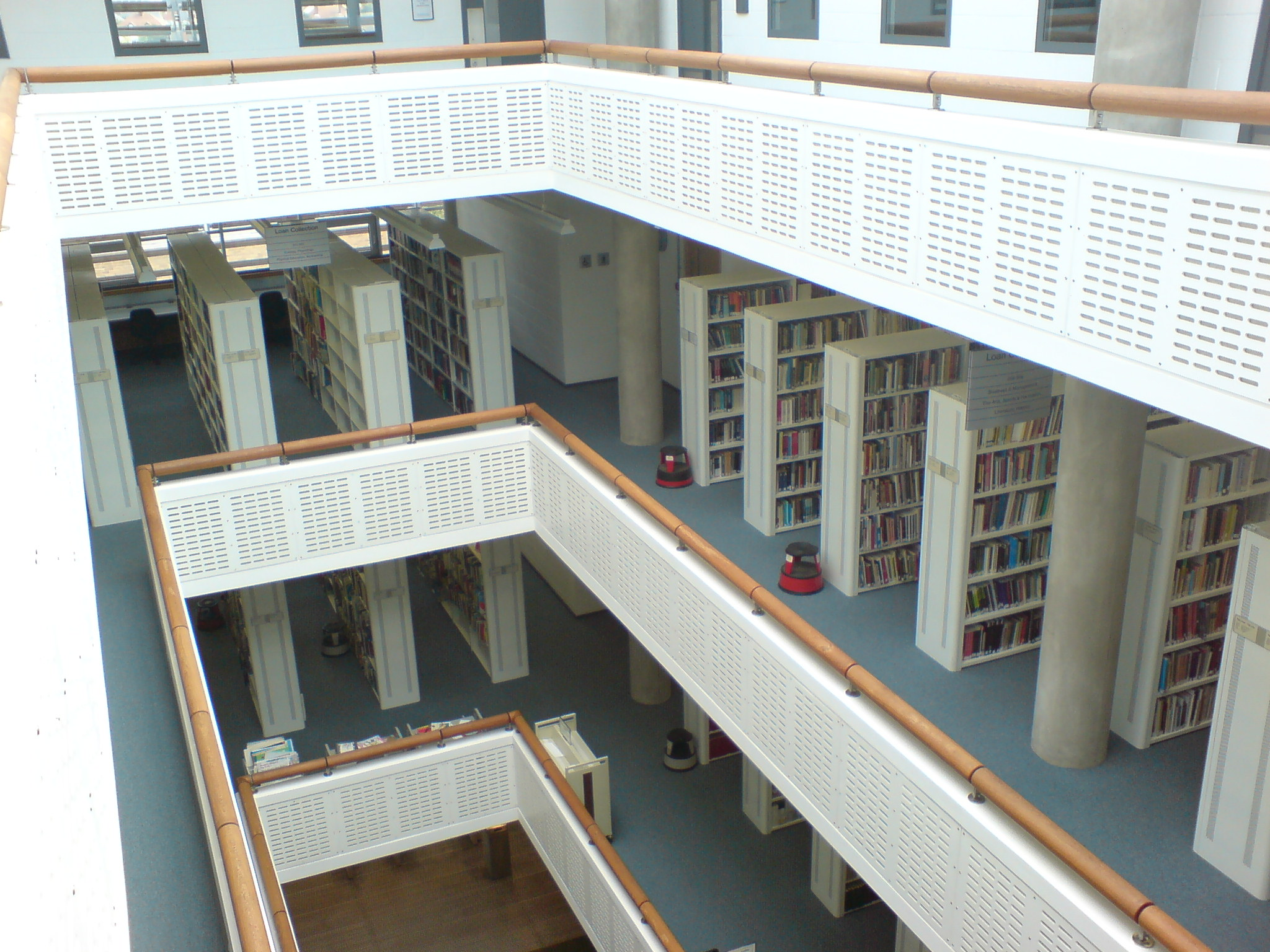
Polhill Library on the Bedford campus

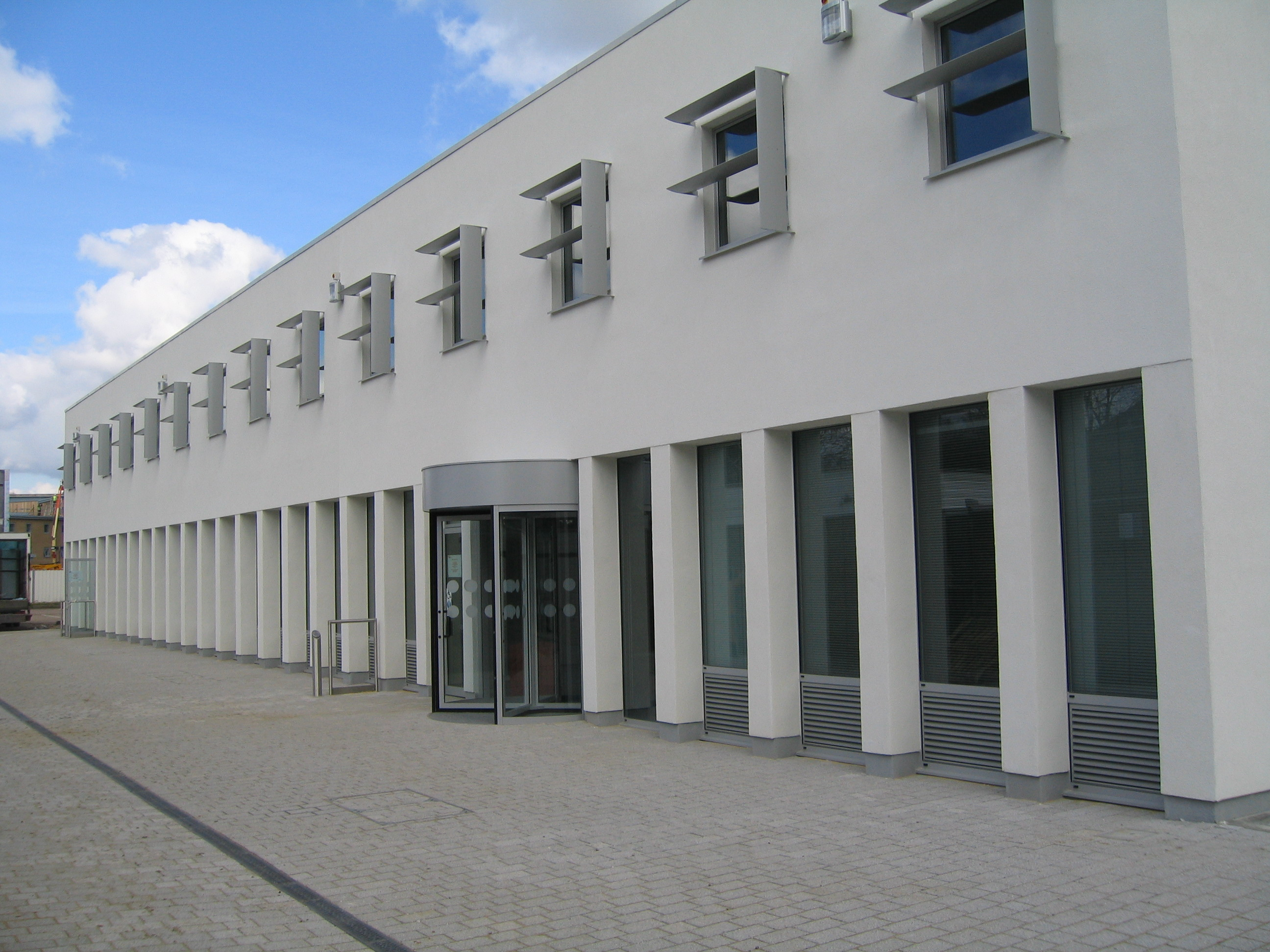
University of Bedfordshire – Bedford Campus Centre

The Bedford campus includes a Physical Education and Sport Science Centre, and a Bedford Campus Centre with a theatre, dance studios, a restaurant and social spaces for students. The 280-seat arena stage theatre is one of the largest in Bedfordshire. Liberty Park, on-site accommodation, offers 500 en-suite study bedrooms.

The Library was designed by van Heyningen and Haward Architects as a gateway to the campus. The building was completed in 2001 and provides approximately 360 individual study spaces, teaching space, staff work areas and traditional library services. There is also the Gateway building which offers teaching and informal learning spaces, lecture theatres and a student service centre over three storeys.

=== Mary Seacole, Aylesbury Campus ===
The university's Mary Seacole Campus opened in February 2020 at the Stoke Mandeville Hospital in Aylesbury and in partnership with Buckinghamshire Healthcare NHS Trust (BHT).

The three-storey building, located on the hospital site, provides a specialist skills lab, set out as a hospital ward with state-of-the-art audio visual technology. There are also a suite of classrooms, a library, social learning spaces and computer study facilities.

=== Milton Keynes Campus ===
The Milton Keynes campus was originally established with the long-term aim of becoming a new, independent university in Milton Keynes.

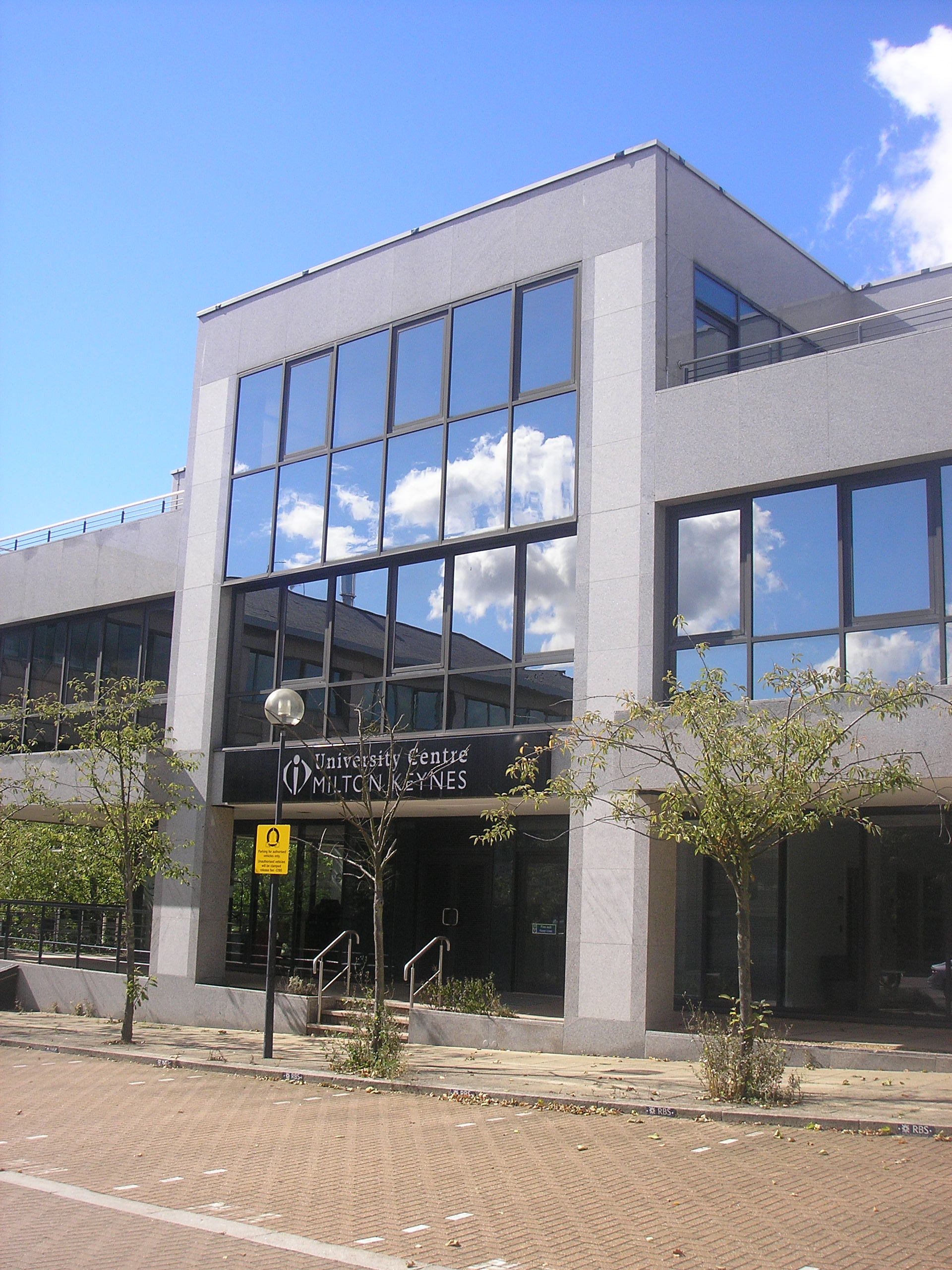
The original University Centre Milton Keynes building at 200 Silbury Boulevard.

The institution began as 'the University Centre Milton Keynes' (UCMK), part of Milton Keynes College and supported by the University of Bedfordshire, the University of Northampton and the Open University. It was opened on 29 September 2008, with start-up funding provided by the Milton Keynes Partnership, which purchased the initial building (a former office block) in Central Milton Keynes.

In October 2009, the University of Bedfordshire (acting as lead academic partner) made a successful bid to the Higher Education Funding Council for England to expand provision at UCMK, one of just six such centres to have achieved this.

In September 2012 the centre ceased to be part of MK College and became a wholly owned subsidiary of the University of Bedfordshire. The university announced plans for a new campus in the city, with the new name of the institution being 'University Campus Milton Keynes', and this was opened at Saxon Court on Avebury Boulevard in September 2013.

Since March 2017, the brand 'UCMK' is no longer in use and the campus now operates as University of Bedfordshire Milton Keynes Campus.

Today, under the operation of the University of Bedfordshire, Milton Keynes campus offers foundation degrees, bachelor's degrees and master's degrees.

== Organisation and structure ==
The university has four faculties: Creative Arts, Technologies and Science; Education and Sport; Health and Social Sciences; and the University of Bedfordshire Business School.

Appointed in 2020, the former Vice Chancellor was Rebecca Bunting. On 27 August 2025, she announced in an email to staff that she would be retiring in December 2025. She was succeeded by Deborah Johnston in June 2026.

The current Chancellor is British journalist and author Sarfraz Manzoor, who was appointed in 2023. He is a known for co-writing the 2019 film Blinded by the Light.

== Academic profile ==
Rankings
National rankings
- Complete (2027): 130
- Guardian (2027): 104
- Times / Sunday Times (2027): 118=

Global rankings
- THE (2026): 1001–1200

The university was commended by the QAA for the high quality and standards of our higher education provision in 2015.

The university appears in Times Higher Education World University rankings, is ranked as one of the top 300 universities in the world under 50 years old in the Young University rankings, and was awarded Silver in the first ever Teaching Excellence Framework (TEF) in 2017. The university participated in the 2021 Research Excellence Framework (REF) which assesses the quality of research in higher education institutions and submitted research across multiple subject areas.

The university hosts the National Centre for Cyberstalking Research, opened in 2012, which carried out the first British study of cyberstalking and other forms of harassment online. In 2012, it established a UNESCO chair in New Media Forms of the Book to analyse trends in the use of electronic media, mobile media, and Internet technologies through research and practice.

=== Awards ===
- Awarded the Queen's Award for Enterprise: International Trade in 2011.
- Outstanding Finance Team winners in the Times Higher Education Leadership and Management Awards 2011.

=== Educational partner institutions ===
The university works together with a number of partner institutions to offer a range of courses:

- Buckinghamshire College Group (Aylesbury)
- Barnfield College
- Bedford College
- Frontline
- Global Banking School
- Institute of Family Therapy
- London School of Commerce
- Milton Keynes College
- New Stamford College
- Pen Green Leadership Centre
- Emil Dale Academy
- Holmes Institute
- London Studio Centre
- Colombo International Nautical and Engineering College
- CTS College of Business and Computer Science, Trinidad
- Executive Business and Computational Institute, Mauritius
- Foreign Trade University, Vietnam
- Kaplan Higher Education, Hong Kong
- Majan College, Oman
- MAPS College, Maldives
- Marbella Design Academy, Spain
- Modern Sciences and Arts University, Egypt
- Music Production and Dance Academy, Italy
- Middle East University, Jordan
- Nations School of Business and Management, Guyana
- Oxford College of Business, Sri Lanka
- Patan College for Professional Studies, Nepal
- SITAL College of Tertiary Education Limited, Trinidad and Tobago
- SHEL School of Higher Education Limited, Trinidad and Tobago
- SLIIT Academy, Sri Lanka
- STI Myanmar
- Westminster International College, Malaysia
- Asian Centre for Management and Technology Ltd (LSC Dhaka), Bangladesh
- Hong Bang University, Vietnam
- Roots IVY International Schools, Pakistan

The university was a co-sponsor of UTC Central Bedfordshire, a university technical college which operated in Houghton Regis from 2012 to 2016.

== Student life ==
The University of Bedfordshire Students' Union is affiliated to the National Union of Students, which represents students nationwide.

In 2020, Radio LaB 97.1FM—the university's affiliated community radio station—won two Community Radio Awards.

== Notable alumni ==
- Zema Abbey
- Rickie Haywood Williams
- Rachel Hopkins
- Gemma Hunt
- Becky Jago
- Stephen Kelman
- Ben Myers
- Melvin Odoom
- Richard Page
- Dami Olonisakin

== See also ==
- Armorial of UK universities
- College of Education
- List of universities in the UK
- University of Bedfordshire Theatre
