= Epping Forest District =

Epping Forest Epping Forest District
- Non-metropolitan district
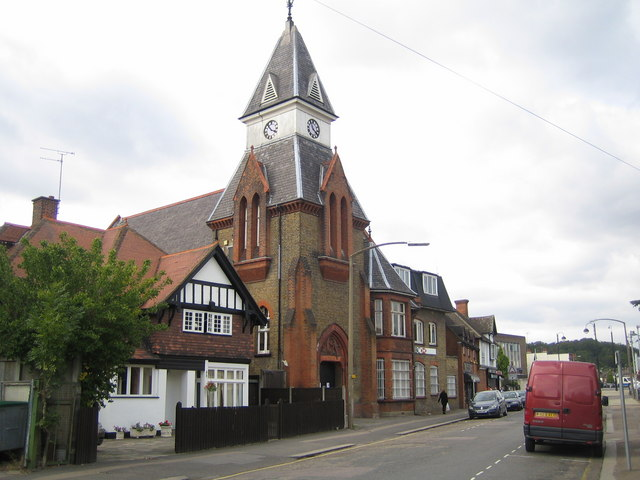
- Lopping Hall in Loughton, the district's largest town

- Epping Forest District shown within Essex
- Sovereign state: United Kingdom
- Constituent country: England
- Region: East of England
- Non-metropolitan county: Essex
- Status: Non-metropolitan district
- Admin HQ: Epping
- Incorporated: 1 April 1974

Government
  - Type: Non-metropolitan district council
  - Body: Epping Forest District Council
  - Leadership: Leader & Cabinet (No overall control)
  - MPs: Neil Hudson; Alex Burghart; Chris Vince

Area
  - Total: 130.88 sq mi (338.99 km^{2})
  - Rank: 106th (of 296)

Population (2025)
  - Total: 138,394
  - Rank: 177th (of 296)
  - Density: 1,057.4/sq mi (408.25/km^{2})

Ethnicity (2021)
  - Ethnic groups: List: 84.1% White; 7.2% Asian; 3.6% Mixed; 2.9% Black; 2.2% other

Religion (2021)
  - Religion: List: 49.4% Christianity; 33.3% no religion; 13.8% other; 3.5% Islam
- Time zone: UTC0 (GMT)
  - Summer (DST): UTC+1 (BST)
- ONS code: 22UH (ONS); E07000072 (GSS)
- OS grid reference: TL455025

Epping Forest District is a local government district in Essex, England. It is named after the ancient woodland of Epping Forest, a large part of which lies within the district. The district covers northeastern parts of the urban area of London, including the suburban towns of Epping, Loughton, Waltham Abbey, Chigwell, and Buckhurst Hill, as well as rural areas beyond it. The district is situated in the west of the county, bordering north-eastern Greater London.

The administrative headquarters of Epping Forest District Council are in the town of Epping. Neighbouring districts are Brentwood, Broxbourne, Chelmsford, East Hertfordshire, Enfield, Harlow, Havering, Redbridge, Uttlesford and Waltham Forest. In 2021 it had a population of 134,909.

== History ==
The district was formed on 1 April 1974 under the Local Government Act 1972, covering the whole area of three former districts and most of a fourth, all of which were abolished at the same time:

- Chigwell Urban District (which included Loughton and Buckhurst Hill as well as Chigwell itself)
- Epping and Ongar Rural District (except the five parishes of Blackmore, Doddinghurst, Kelvedon Hatch, Navestock and Stondon Massey, which went to Brentwood)
- Epping Urban District
- Waltham Holy Cross Urban District

The new district was named Epping Forest after the ancient woodland of that name, much of which falls within the district. The woodland is in turn named after the town of Epping.

Since 1974 there have been some changes to the district's boundary with Greater London:

- In 1994, 279 acres (1.13 km^{2}) of Waltham Abbey, which now form Enfield Island Village, were transferred to the London Borough of Enfield.
- In 1995 a small area around Grange Hill and Roding Valley tube stations was transferred to the London Borough of Redbridge.

In August 2025, the district council was granted an interim injunction preventing the housing of Asylum seekers in the Bell hotel. The decision was reversed on appeal later that month.

In March 2026, the government announced that it would abolish the district in 2028 as part of local government reform across Essex. These proposals were withdrawn in September 2026.

== Governance ==
Epping Forest District Council

Type
- Type: Non-metropolitan district

Leadership
- Chair: Alan Lion, Conservative since 28 May 2026
- Leader: Chris Whitbread, Conservative since 22 May 2012
- Chief Executive (acting): Andrew Small since 21 February 2025

Structure
- Seats: 54 councillors
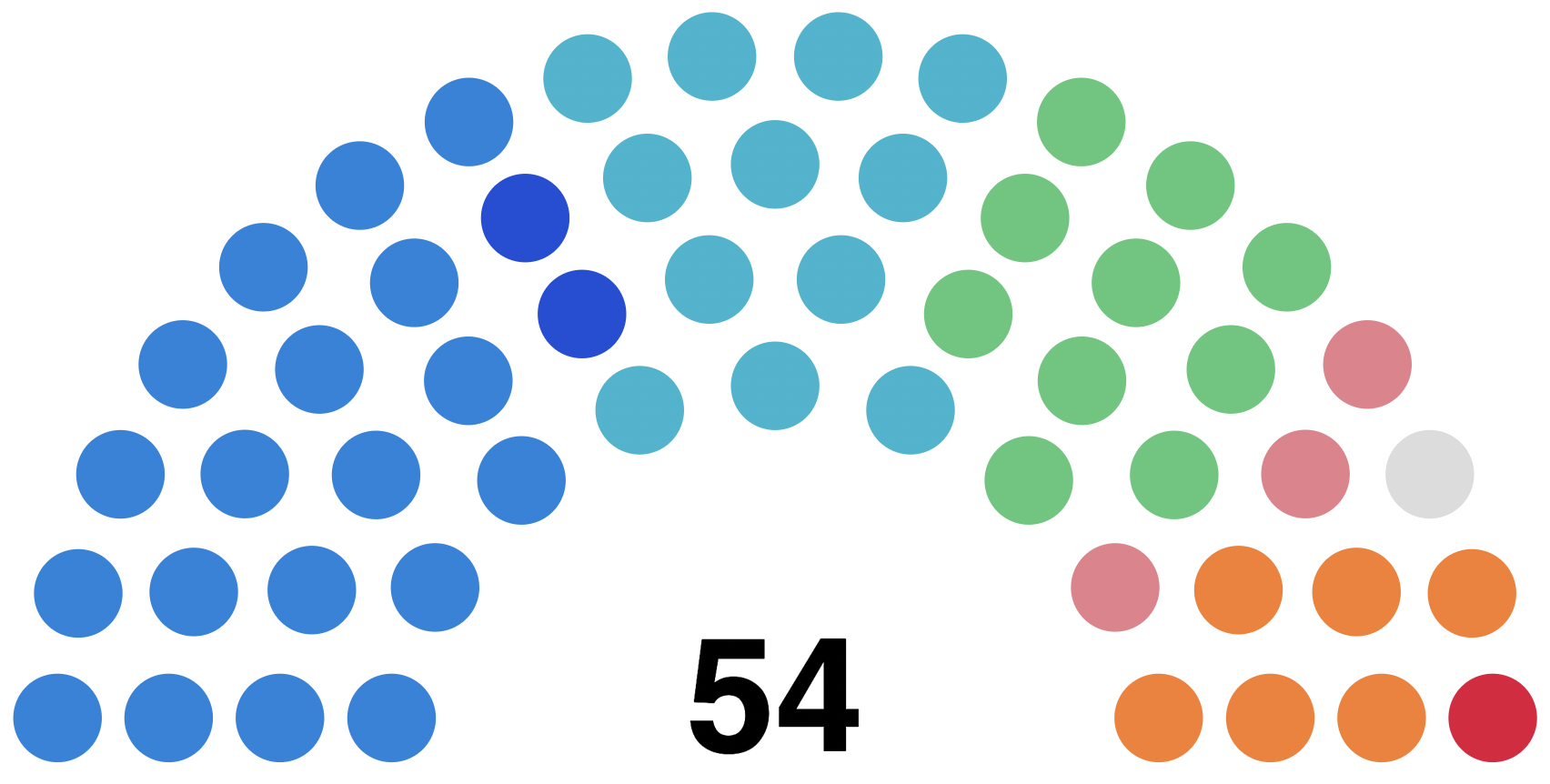
- Political groups: Administration (19) Conservative (19) Other parties (35) Reform UK (12) LRA (10) Liberal Democrats (6) R4L (2) Labour (1) Independent (4)

Elections
- Last election: 7 May 2026

Meeting place
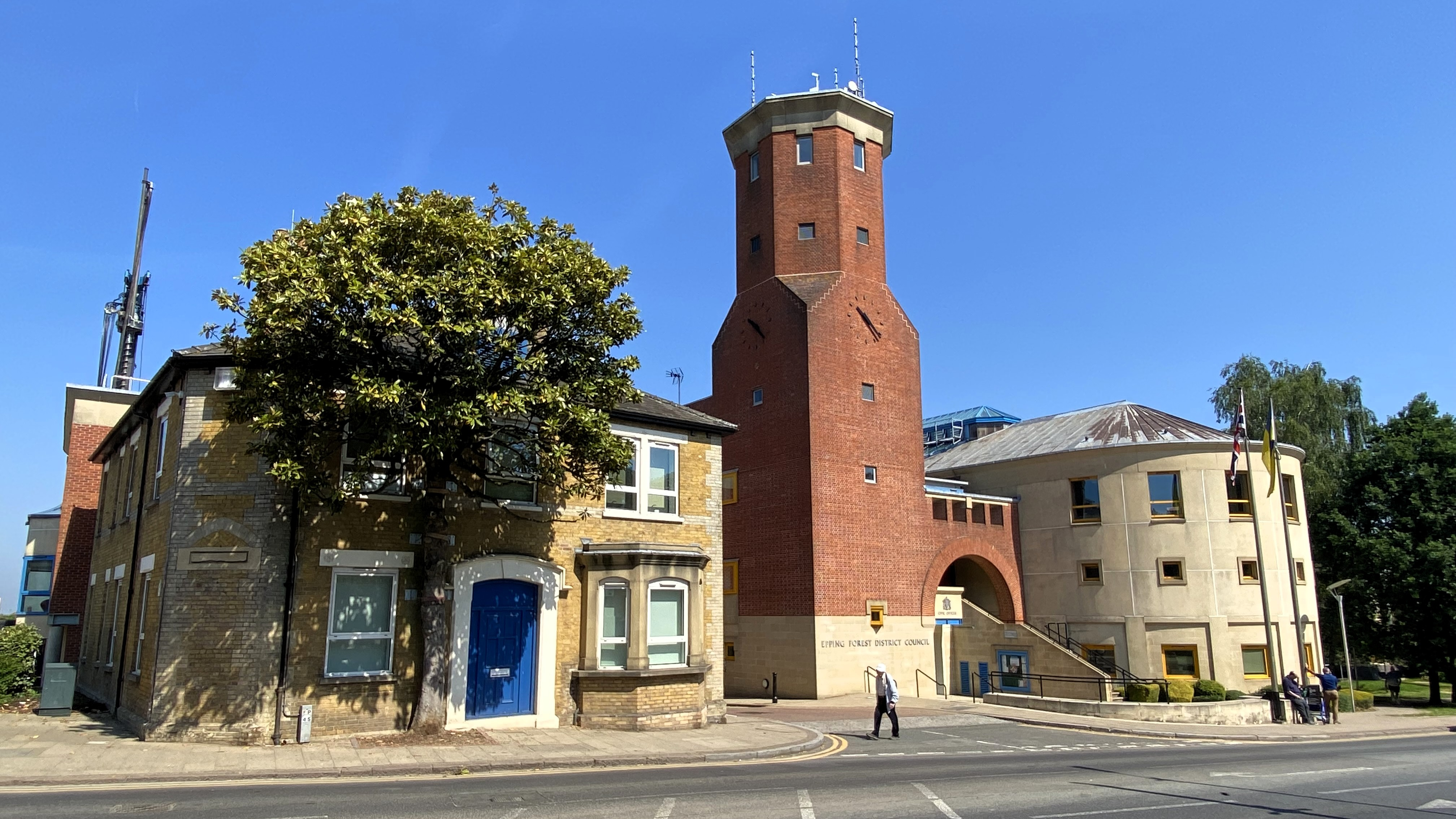
- Civic Offices, 323 High Street, Epping, CM16 4BZ

Website
- www.eppingforestdc.gov.uk

Epping Forest District Council provides district-level services. County-level services are provided by Essex County Council. The district is also entirely covered by civil parishes, which form a third tier of local government.

=== Political control ===
The council has been under no overall control with a minority Conservative Party administration since 2025, when two Conservative councillors became independents.

The first election to the council was held in 1973, initially operating as a shadow authority alongside the outgoing authorities until the new arrangements came into effect on 1 April 1974. Political control of the council since 1974 has been as follows:

Party in control	Years
Conservative	1974–1994
No overall control	1994–2006
Conservative	2006–2025
No overall control	2025–present

=== Leadership ===
The leaders of the council since 2003 have been:

Councillor	Party	From	To
Maggie McEwen	Conservative		18 Feb 2003
Michael Heavens	Liberal Democrats	24 Feb 2003	24 Jun 2004
John Knapman	Chigwell Residents' Association	24 Jun 2004	May 2006
Diana Collins	Conservative	18 May 2006	18 May 2011
Lesley Wagland	Conservative	24 May 2011	22 May 2012
Chris Whitbread	Conservative	22 May 2012	

=== Composition ===
Following the 2026 election, and subsequent changes of allegiance up to July 2026, the composition of the council was:

Party	Councillors
Conservative	19
Reform	12
Loughton Residents	10
Liberal Democrats	6
Residents for Loughton	2
Labour	1
Independent	4
Total	54

Three of the four independent councillors sit together as the "Epping Forest Independents Group".

=== Elections ===
Since the last boundary changes in 2024 the council has comprised 54 councillors representing 18 wards, with each ward electing three councillors. Elections are held three years out of every four, with a third of the council (one councillor for each ward) elected each time for a four-year term of offices. Essex County Council elections are held in the fourth year of the cycle when there are no district council elections.

The district straddles three parliamentary constituencies of Epping Forest, Brentwood and Ongar, and Harlow.

=== Premises ===
Epping Forest District Council is based at the Civic Offices at 323 High Street, Epping.

When the council was first created it inherited four sets of offices from its predecessors and functions were initially divided between them:

- Council Offices, Old Station Road, Loughton from Chigwell Urban District Council.
- 25 Hemnall Street, Epping from Epping Urban District Council.
- 323 High Street, Epping from Epping and Ongar Rural District Council.
- Town Hall, Highbridge Street, Waltham Abbey from Waltham Holy Cross Urban District Council.

The council subsequently built a large new building, Epping Civic Offices, adjoining the original converted house at 323 High Street in Epping. The new building was designed by Richard Reid and built between 1987 and 1992. It was designated a Grade II listed building in 2017.

== Geography ==
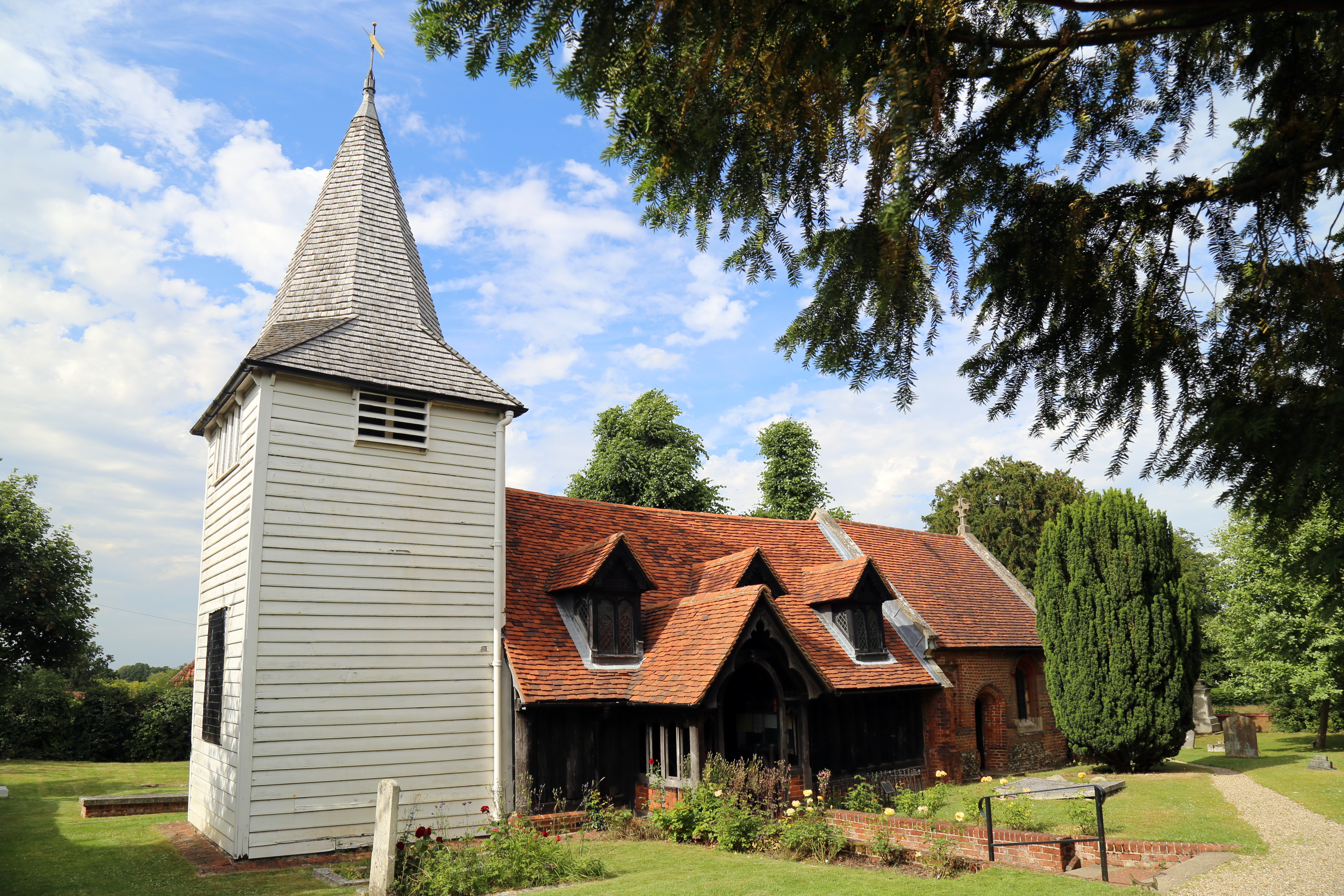
Greensted Church, a wooden church dating back to the mid-9th century

The north-east of the district is rural and sparsely populated for an area so close to London; this area includes Chipping Ongar and surrounding villages. The south-west of the district closer to the boundary with Greater London is more suburban and is dominated by Loughton, the largest town in the district. Most of the district has a wide range of architectural styles and periods. Loughton adjoins the woodland of Epping Forest to the west and is separated by farms, rivers and golf courses from other settlements in other directions. As an example of conserved physical geographic landscapes, the Roding Valley and Three Forests Way (one end of the Stort Valley Way and the other end connecting to the Harcamlow Way in Hatfield Forest and National Nature Reserve, Essex which is north of Epping Forest District.

The River Roding runs through the eastern portion of the district, with the Lea Valley in the west.

Buckhurst Hill, Chigwell, Waltham Abbey and Loughton, although they are not within Greater London, are included in the Office for National Statistics definition of the Greater London Built-up Area.

Epping Forest district is bounded by the Harlow, Uttlesford, Chelmsford and Brentwood districts of Essex, the East Hertfordshire and Broxbourne districts of Hertfordshire, and the London boroughs of Havering, Redbridge, Waltham Forest and Enfield.

== Transport ==
=== Rail ===
Roydon railway station on the West Anglia Main Line is the only National Rail station within the district, which lies on the district boundary with East Hertfordshire. Sawbridgeworth railway station on the same line lies directly west of the district, within Hertfordshire, as does Waltham Cross railway station, which serves the district's town of Waltham Abbey. These stations are served by Greater Anglia trains either between London Liverpool Street and Ely, and London Stratford and Bishop's Stortford, with direct connections to destinations such as Broxbourne, Tottenham Hale, Audley End and Cambridge.

The London Underground Central line passes through the southern portion of Epping Forest. Epping, Theydon Bois, Debden and Loughton stations in the borough fall in London fare zone 6, with Buckhurst Hill in zone 5 and Roding Valley, Chigwell and Grange Hill in zone 4.

The Central line provides the district with direct connections with East London, The City, the West End, and West London. Transport for London manages the London Underground network.

A former portion of the Central line between Epping and Chipping Ongar, via North Weald and Blake Hall, is part of the Epping Ongar Railway.

=== Road ===
Two motorways meet in the district - the M25 London Orbital motorway and the M11 motorway.

The M25 motorway runs eastbound (clockwise) towards Brentwood and the Dartford Crossing. The motorway runs westbound (anticlockwise) towards Enfield, Watford and Heathrow Airport. The M11 motorway runs northbound towards Stansted Airport and Cambridge, and southbound towards East London. Junctions 5 (A1168, Loughton and Chigwell), 6 (M25), 7 (A414, Harlow) and 7A (A1025, Harlow) fall within Epping Forest.

Other main routes in the district include:

- A414 primary route - between Harlow and Chelmsford, via Ongar. Onward connections towards Hemel Hempstead via Harlow, and Maldon;
- A104 Epping New Road - between Wake Arms and Woodford. Onward connections towards Leyton and Islington;
- A112 - between Waltham Abbey and Sewardstone. Onward connections towards Walthamstow and Stratford;
- A113 - between Chipping Ongar and Chigwell. Onward connections towards Wanstead;
- A121 - between Waltham Cross and Woodford, via Waltham Abbey, Loughton and Buckhurst Hill;
- A128 - Chipping Ongar. Onward connections towards Brentwood and Thurrock;
- A1069 - Onward connections towards Chingford;
- A1112 - Chigwell Row. Onward connections towards Chadwell Heath;
- A1168 - between Loughton and Chigwell;
- B184 - between Ongar and Great Dunmow. Onward connections towards Saffron Walden;
- B1393 - between Wake Arms and M11 junction 7, via Epping.

Most public highways in the district are managed by Essex County Council. The M11 and M25 motorways are managed by National Highways.

Local bus services in the south of the district (Buckhurst Hill, Loughton, Chigwell, Debden and Stapleford Abbotts) are red London buses operated by Transport for London. Elsewhere services are run by private operators on a commercial basis, or with subsidy from the county council.

=== Cycling ===
National Cycle Network Route 1 passes along the eastern boundary of the district near Broxbourne, through Harlow, and east-west through the district via High Laver, Moreton and Fyfield.

A shared-use path runs alongside the Rivers Lee and Stort, which connect the district with other cycle routes in Hertfordshire and London.

Epping Forest features a network of shared-use forest trails, managed by the City of London Corporation.

=== Aviation ===
North Weald Airfield is owned by Epping Forest District Council and is open to general aviation. Flying out of North Weald began in 1916, during the First World War.

Stapleford Aerodrome is home to a flight training centre within the district.

Stansted Airport, an international passenger and freight airport, lies in the neighbouring district of Uttlesford, north of the district.

=== Rivers ===
The Lee Navigation and River Stort are navigable rivers which form the district's eastern boundary. They are managed by the Canal and River Trust, and connect with the Regent's Canal in London via Hertford Union Canal.

== Media ==
In terms of television, the area is served by BBC London and ITV London with television signals received from the Crystal Palace TV transmitter. BBC East and ITV Anglia can also be received from Sandy Heath TV transmitter.

Radio stations for the area are:

- BBC Essex
- BBC Three Counties Radio can also be received.
- Heart East (formerly Ten-17)
- Forest Gold Radio, a community based radio station the broadcast from near the St Margaret's Hospital in Epping.

The Epping Forest Guardian is the local newspaper.

== Nature reserves ==
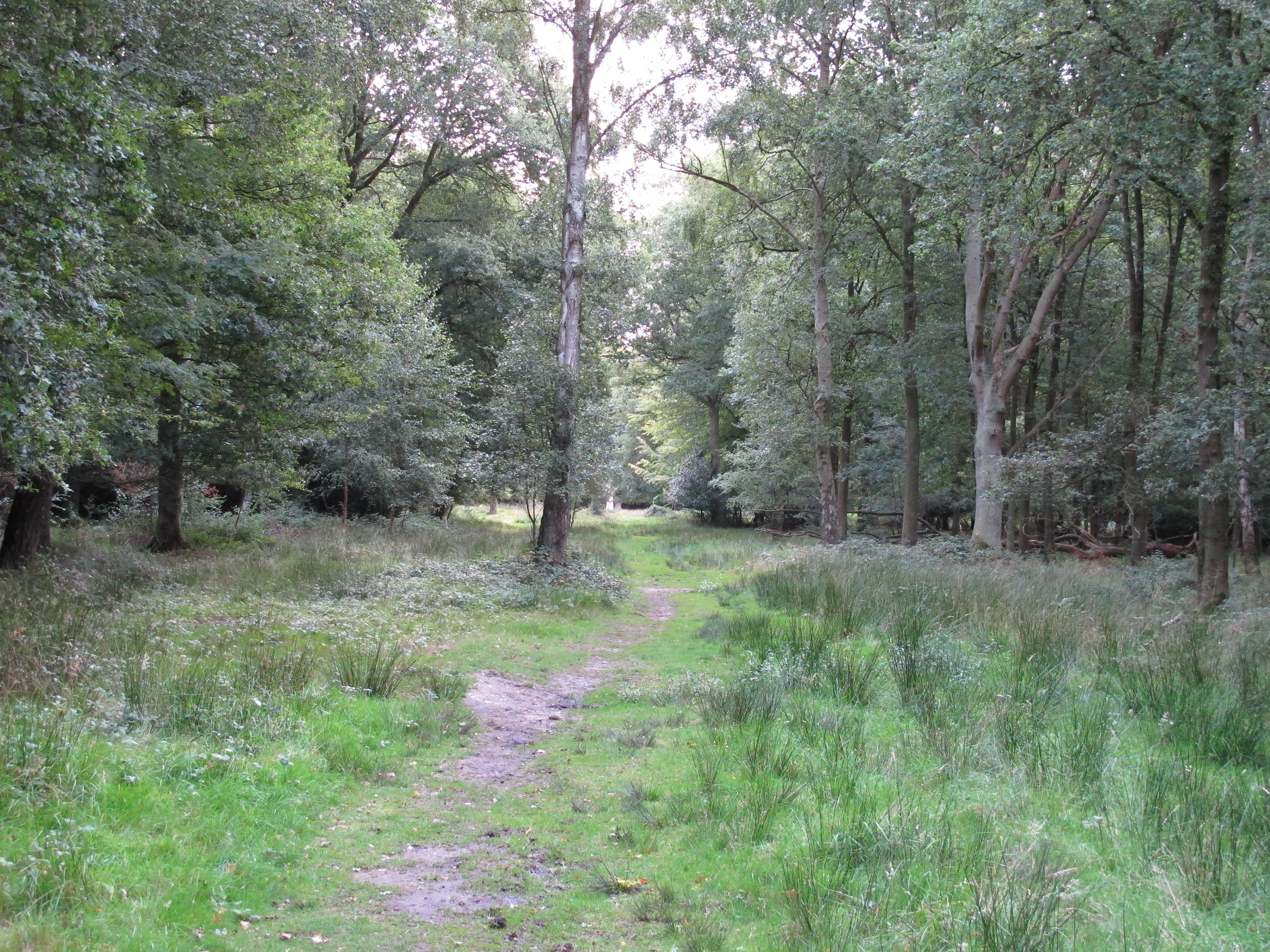
The Lower Forest, Epping Forest

Epping Forest District Council has nine nature local nature reserves (LNRs):

- Chigwell Row Wood LNR
- Church Lane Flood Meadow LNR
- Home Mead LNR
- Linder's Field LNR
- Nazeing Triangle LNR
- Roding Valley Meadows LNR
- Roughtalley's Wood LNR
- Thornwood Flood Meadow LNR
- Weald Common Flood Meadows LNR

Roding Valley Meadows Local Nature Reserve (LNR) is the district's oldest nature reserve, designated in 1986, and the largest at 56 hectares.

Seven Sites of Special Scientific Interest on the Natural England register fall within Epping Forest. These are:

- Epping Forest
- Cornmill Stream and Old River Lea
- Hainault Forest
- Hunsdon Mead (part)
- Roding Valley Meadows
- Turnford and Cheshunt Pits (part)
- Waltham Abbey

Essex Wildlife Trust manages sites at:

- Gernon Bushes Nature Reserve, near Coopersale
- Hunsdon Mead, near Roydon
- Roding Valley Meadows, near Chigwell

The woodland of Epping Forest partially falls within the Epping Forest district. It has been owned and conserved by the City of London Corporation - the local authority which governs the Square Mile - since the Epping Forest Act 1878.

== Parishes ==
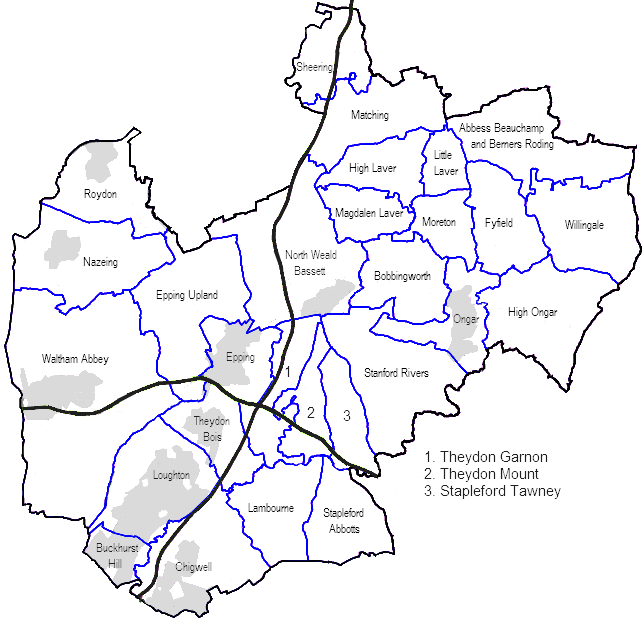
Civil parishes in Epping Forest District. The forest itself today spans from Epping Upland to the Greater London border

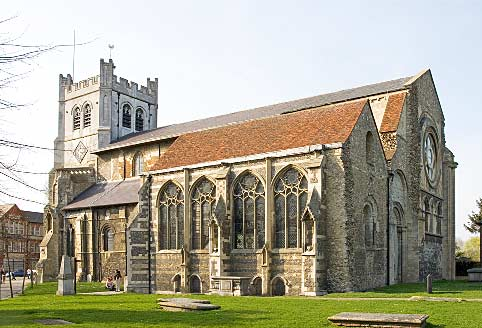
Waltham Abbey Church

The district is divided into 28 civil parishes. The parish councils of Epping, Loughton, Ongar and Waltham Abbey take the style "town council". The five parishes of Bobbingworth, High Laver, Little Laver, Magdalen Laver and Moreton share a grouped parish council called Moreton, Bobbingworth and the Lavers Parish Council.

- Abbess Beauchamp and Berners Roding
- Bobbingworth
- Buckhurst Hill
- Chigwell
- Epping (town)
- Epping Upland
- Fyfield
- High Laver
- High Ongar
- Lambourne
- Little Laver
- Loughton (town)
- Magdalen Laver
- Matching
- Moreton
- Nazeing
- North Weald Bassett
- Ongar (town)
- Roydon
- Sheering
- Stanford Rivers
- Stapleford Abbotts
- Stapleford Tawney
- Theydon Bois
- Theydon Garnon
- Theydon Mount
- Waltham Abbey (town)
- Willingale

== Arms ==
Coat of arms of Epping Forest District

Notes
Granted 31 December 1975.
Crest
On a wreath Argent and Gules upon a mount Vert in front of a castle of three towers each domed and ensigned with a cross crosslet all Gules a stag courant Proper.
Escutcheon
Argent a cross engrailed Sable over all a bugle horn ensigned with an ancient crown Or on a chief Vert four axeheads bendwise Argent.
Supporters
On either side a stag guardant Proper holding in the mouth a seaxe Argent the hilt and pommel inwards Or.
Motto
Per Crucem Per Coronam (Through The Cross Through The Crown).
Badge
A stag's head caboshed Proper holding in the mouth a seaxe Argent the hilt and pommel to the dexter Or.
