= Moreton, Essex =

Village in Essex, England

Coordinates: 51.7428°N 0.2188°E

Moreton
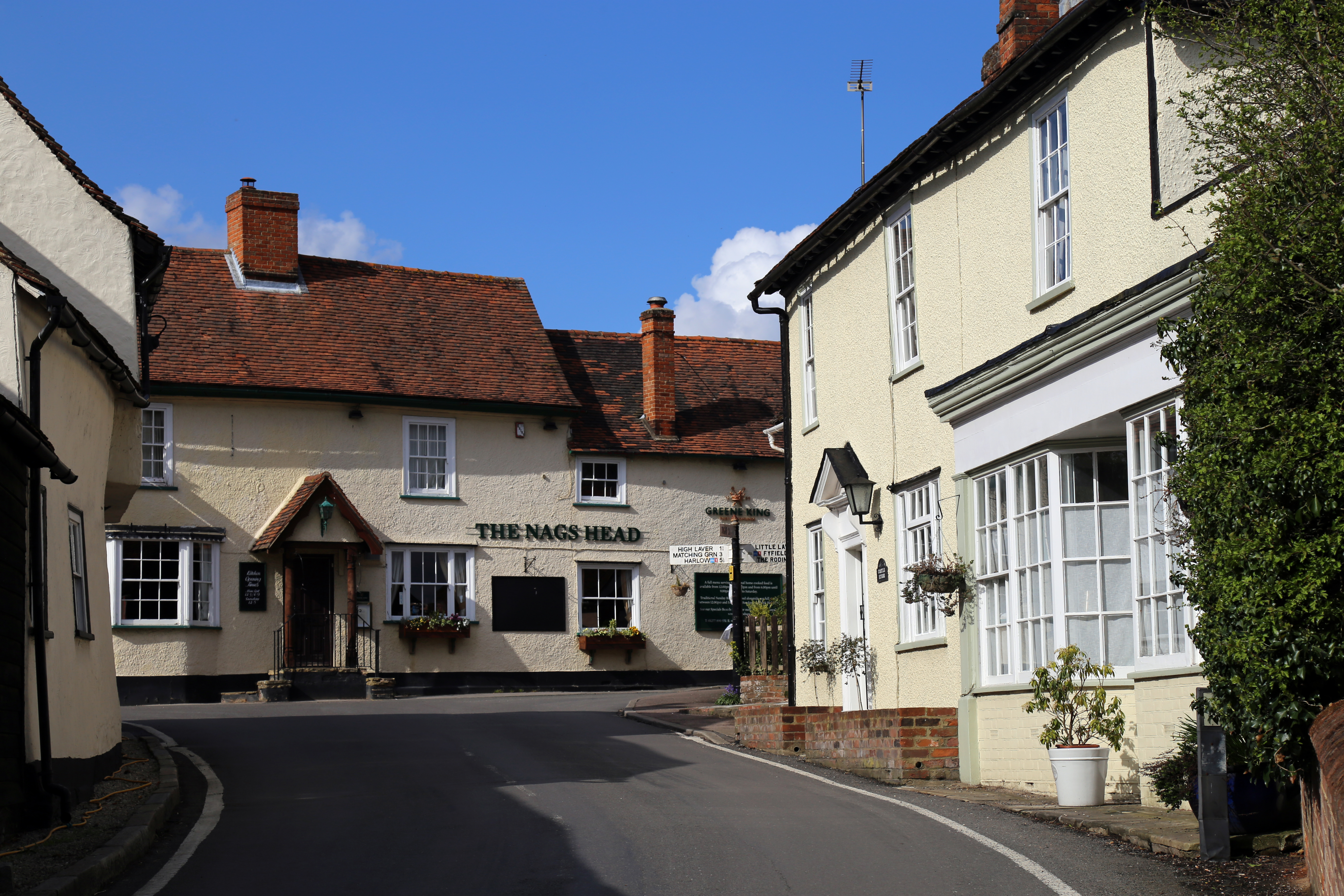
- Bridge Road and Nags Head pub

- Location within Essex
- Population: 431 (Parish, 2021)
- District: Epping Forest
- Shire county: Essex
- Region: East
- Country: England
- Sovereign state: United Kingdom
- Post town: ONGAR
- Postcode district: CM5
- Dialling code: 01277
- Police: Essex
- Fire: Essex
- Ambulance: East of England
- UK Parliament: Brentwood and Ongar

Moreton is a village and civil parish in the Epping Forest district of Essex, England. It is located 3 miles (5 km) north-west of Chipping Ongar. At the 2021 census the parish had a population of 431.

== History ==
The village lies at a bridging point on the stream of Cripsey Brook, a tributary of the River Roding. A Roman road from Great Dunmow to London crossed the stream here. The modern bridge is a brick structure built in the 18th century.

There is no modern road, at this point, following the route of the Roman road out of the village, but the old road's route can be followed at Tawney Common a few miles to the south-west. Modern Moreton remains at the convergence of various minor roads, however, which link to Fyfield, to the east, Bobbingworth to the south, High Laver to the west and Matching to the north. Where the roads meet there remain several substantial village houses from the late Medieval / early modern period as well as two traditional English pubs, being the White Hart and the Nag's Head.

Directly to the east of the Nag's Head, Moreton features a primary school, which retains its small Victorian era main building, but in recent decades has grown as schools in neighbouring villages have been closed down.

The surrounding area is agricultural. There is also a seed processing plant that is just a short distance to the north of the village, which processes cereal, pulse, and oilseed rape seeds. Apart from that, commercial activity has largely abandoned the village, and today many residents commute to Harlow, Loughton, Chelmsford or London.

For many years after petrol and diesel engined tractors became mainstream in England, Moreton retained a depot housing steam tractors (traction engines) but historical traction engines are no longer a feature of Moreton.

== Gallery ==
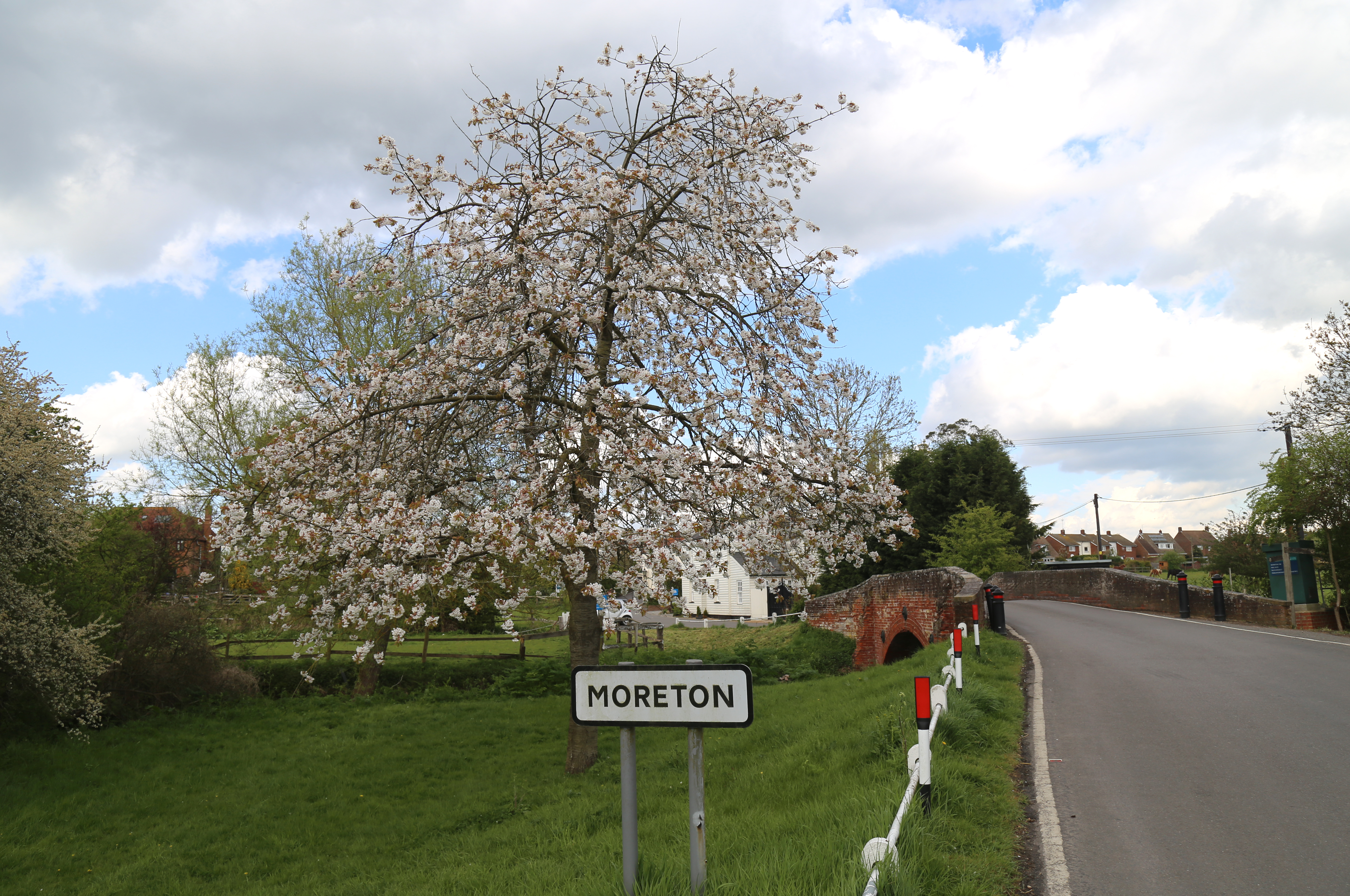
Entering Moreton village

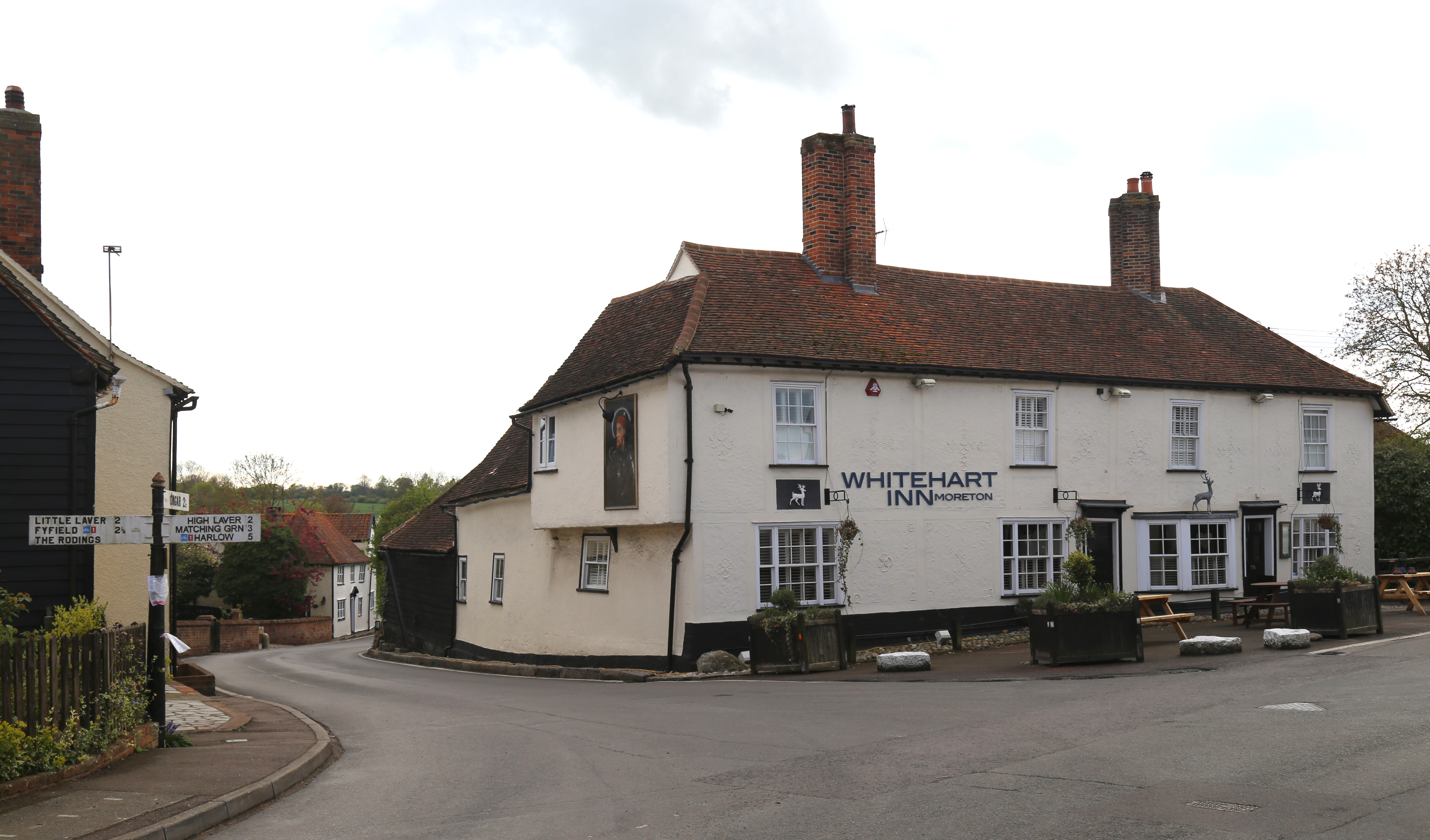
White Hart Inn

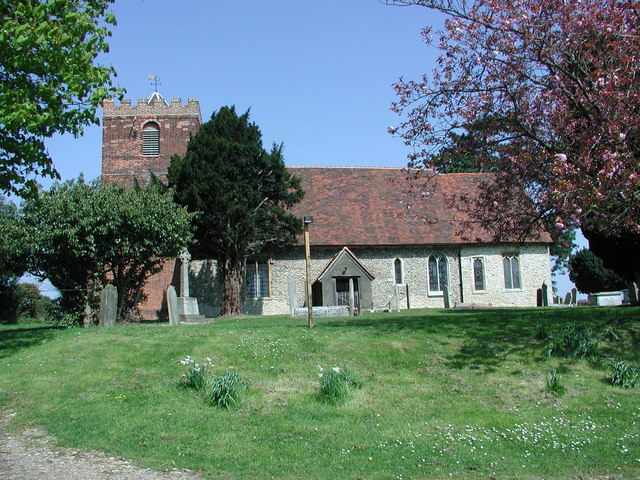
St Mary's Church

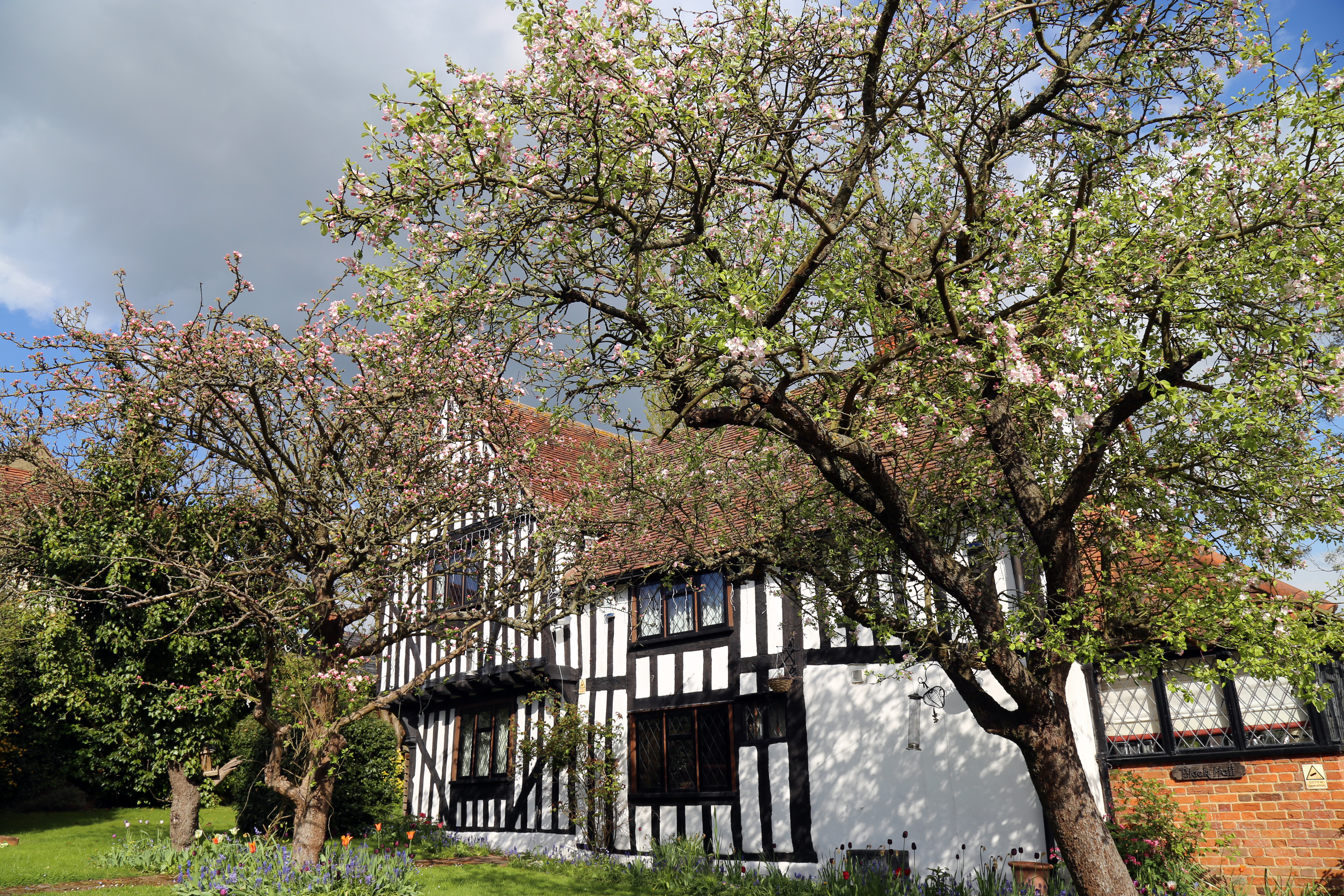
Black Hall

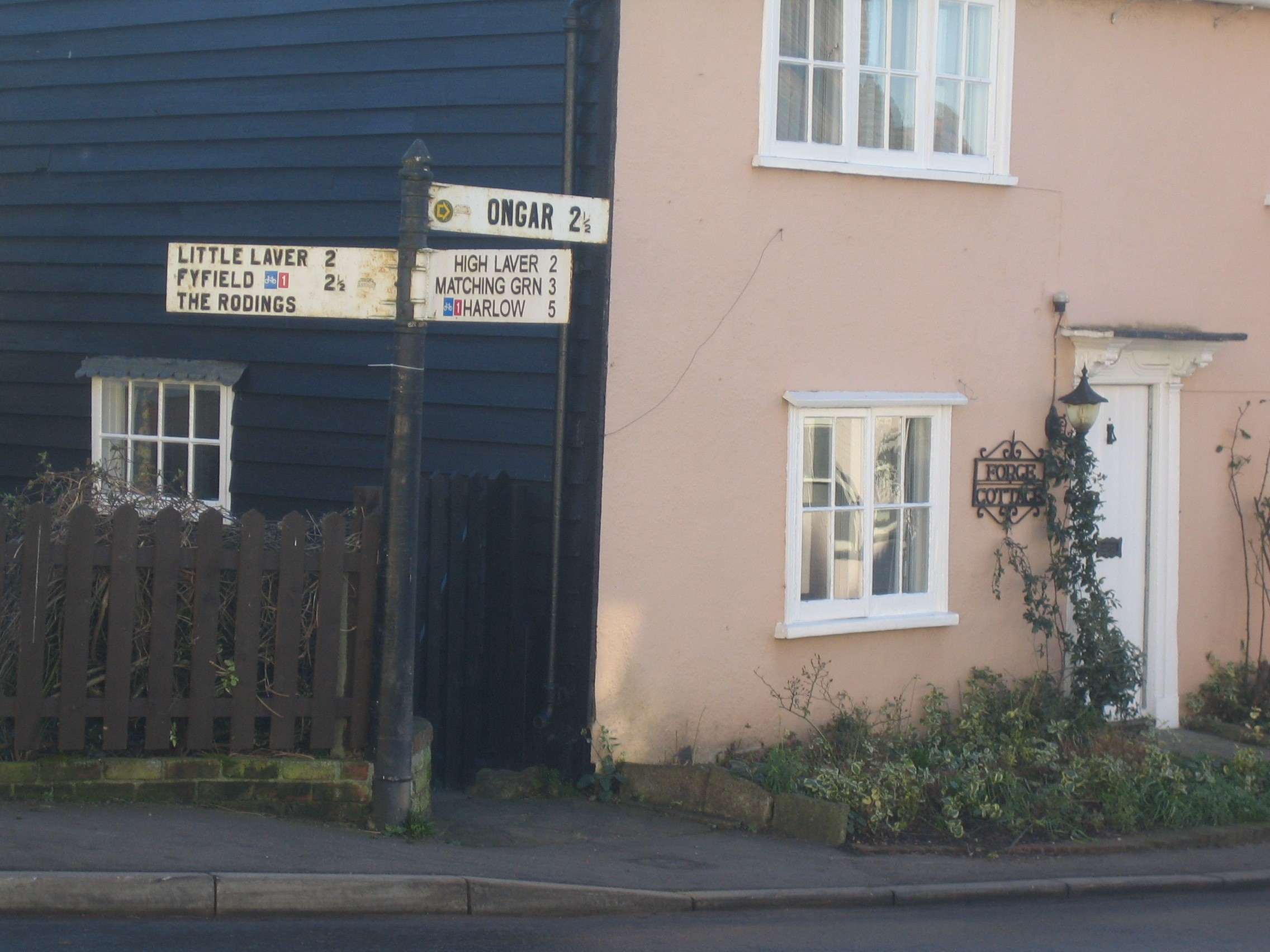
Distances from Moreton
