= High Laver =

Village in Essex, England

Coordinates: 51.756°N 0.212°E

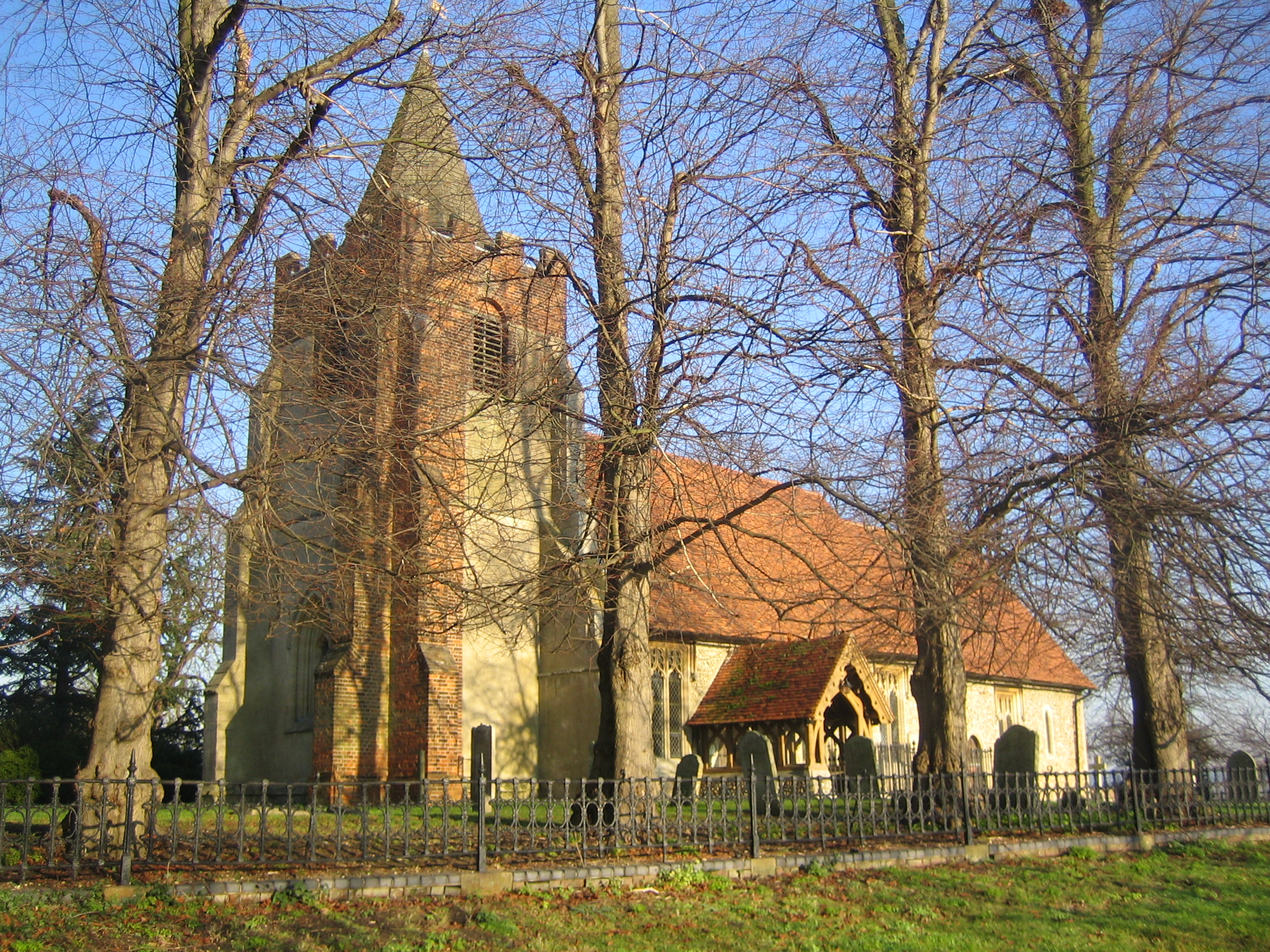
- All Saints' Church, High Laver

- Location within Essex
- Population: 259 (Parish, 2021)
- OS grid reference: TL526087
- Civil parish: High Laver
- District: Epping Forest
- Shire county: Essex
- Region: East
- Country: England
- Sovereign state: United Kingdom
- Post town: ONGAR
- Postcode district: CM5
- Dialling code: 01277
- Police: Essex
- Fire: Essex
- Ambulance: East of England

High Laver (/ˈleɪvər/ LAY-vər) is a village and civil parish in the Epping Forest district of the county of Essex, England. The parish is noted for its association with the philosopher John Locke. At the 2021 census the parish had a population of 259.

== History ==
High Laver is historically a rural agricultural parish, predominantly arable. In 1086 there were 1428 acres of arable land, woodland for 200 pigs and 37½ acres of meadow. The 1881 census data collected indicates that the majority of the male population were employed in agriculture.

High Laver school was founded 1866 with accommodation for 75 children. At one point the school breached its capacity with a total of 132 pupils attending. Pupils of High Laver today typically attend Magdalen Laver school, west from High Laver. The manor of Otes may originally have been part of Little Laver. It was purchased around 1614 by William Masham, and passed to his son Sir William Masham, 1st Baronet. When John Locke, British philosopher, died in 1704, he was buried at High Laver, where he had lived at Otes as a paying guest in the household of Sir Francis Masham, 3rd Baronet since 1691. The wife of Sir Francis was the philosopher and theologian Damaris Cudworth Masham.

In 1887 John Bartholomew, in the Gazetteer of the British Isles, wrote: "Laver, High, par., Essex, in NW. of co., 4 m. NW. of Ongar, 1891 ac., pop. 477; the churchyard contains the grave of John Locke (1632–1704), the philosopher".

== Geography ==
High Laver village is situated 4 miles (6.4 km) east of Harlow and 1.4 miles (2.2 km) north-west of Moreton. The land is nearly 300 ft. (90 m.) above sea-level in the south-west, about 250 ft. (75 m.) in the north and 230 ft. (70 m.) in the east.

== Demography ==
"In 1801 the population was 346. By 1851 it had grown to 534. It was a little below this level until the last decade of the century when there was a sharp decline to 386. In the first half of the 20th century it rose gradually to 463 in 1951" According to 2011 census data High Laver had a population of 493 persons across 200 households. Within High Laver 260 persons out of the 493 who participated in the 2011 census aged 16 to 74 are in employment. The 1881 census data indicates that the majority of the Male population of High Laver were employed in agriculture, this is typical of Parishes at this time due to the surrounding countryside being ideal for farming. 2011 census data indicate that 260 16- to 74-year-olds are in employment out of the total population of 493. The demographics in High Laver are fairly uneven according to the 2011 census data; the data indicates that the largest demographic are the 45 to 59's.

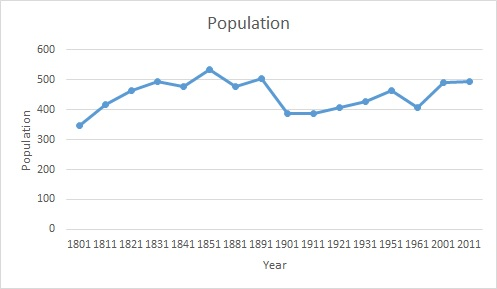
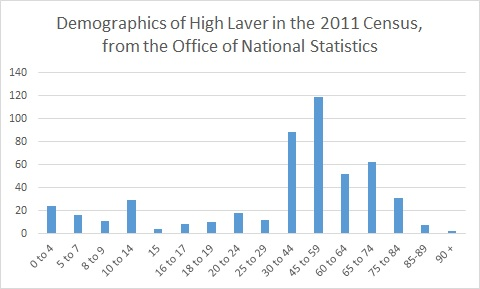

== Landmarks ==
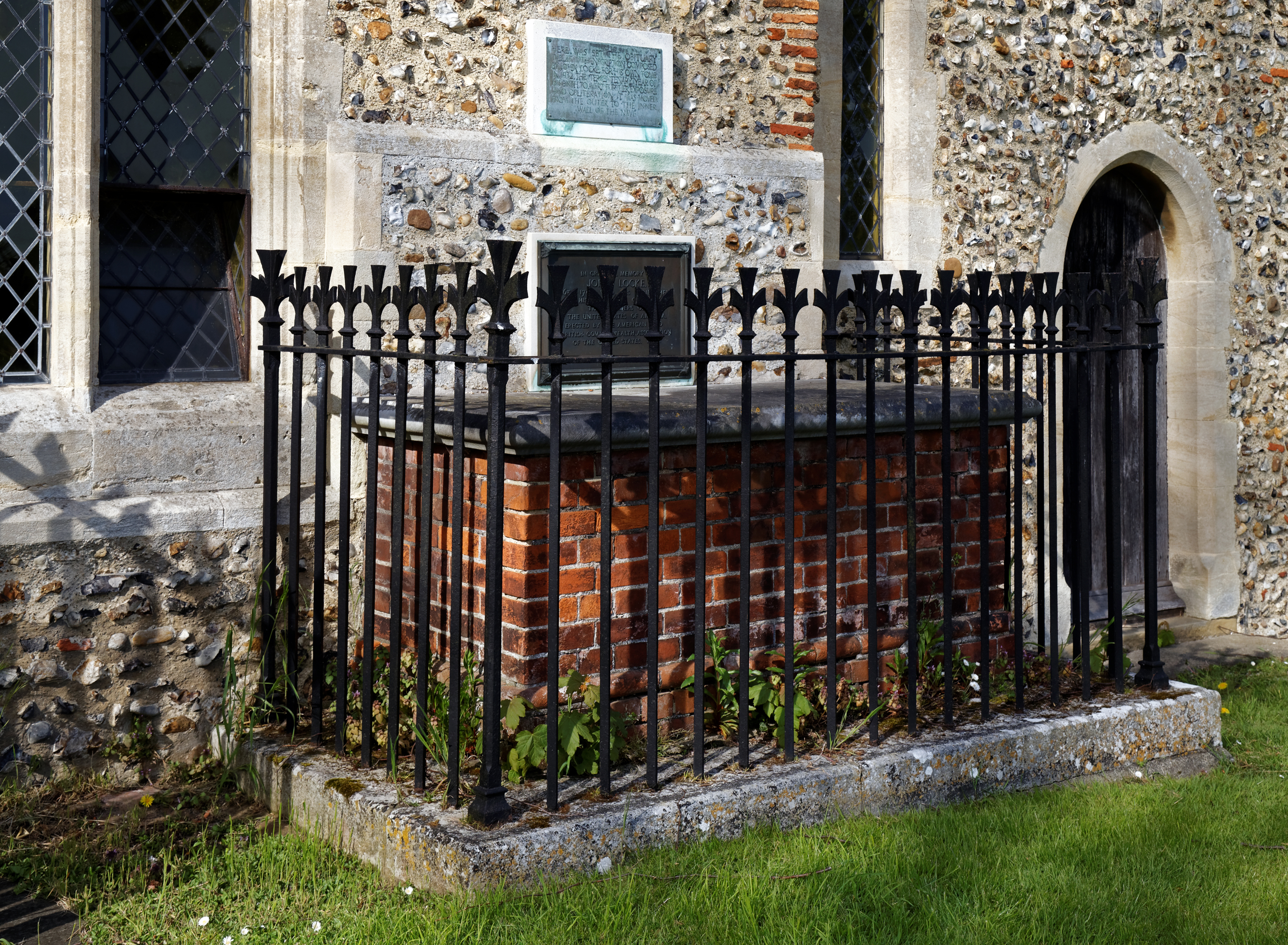
Chest tomb of John Locke

All Saints' Church consists of a nave, chancel, west tower, south porch, and north vestry. The church was constructed from flint and rubble during the late 12th century; there also remains evidence that some Roman bricks and tiles were used as they are visible among the chancel walls, and also the north wall of the nave. Over the years there has been refurbishment and maintenance on the church. In the 15th or 16th century the roofs of the chancel and nave, which are ceiled in except for the plates and tie-beams, were renewed. Within the tower there is a font with an octagonal bowl which dates from the 14th century.

Outside the south wall of the nave is the brick altar tomb of the philosopher John Locke (1632–1704). A mural tablet, originally above the tomb, was moved inside the church for preservation in 1932. The grave of Abigail Masham, Baroness Masham, a favourite of Queen Anne and a cousin of Sarah Churchill, Duchess of Marlborough, is also found in the churchyard. The complex relationship between these three women is dramatised in the film The Favourite.

== Notable people ==
- Samuel Masham, 1st Baron Masham (1678/79 – 1758), British courtier, lived at Oates Manor in High Laver
- Damaris Cudworth Masham (1659–1708), English writer, philosopher, theologian, wife of Francis Masham, 3rd Baronet
- John Locke FRS (1632–1704), English philosopher and physician, lived with the Masham family at Oates Manor
- Thomas Standfield (1789–1864), one of the Tolpuddle Martyrs, lived with his family at Fenners Farm, Tilegate Green from 1838 to 1846

== Transport ==
The main road from Ongar to Harlow which is a key transport route enters the parish at High Laver Bridge. High Laver lies near junction seven of the M11 motorway. There are three bus services that run through the parish, four days a week. The nearest railway station is Harlow Town. Epping Underground station is equidistant.

== Gallery ==
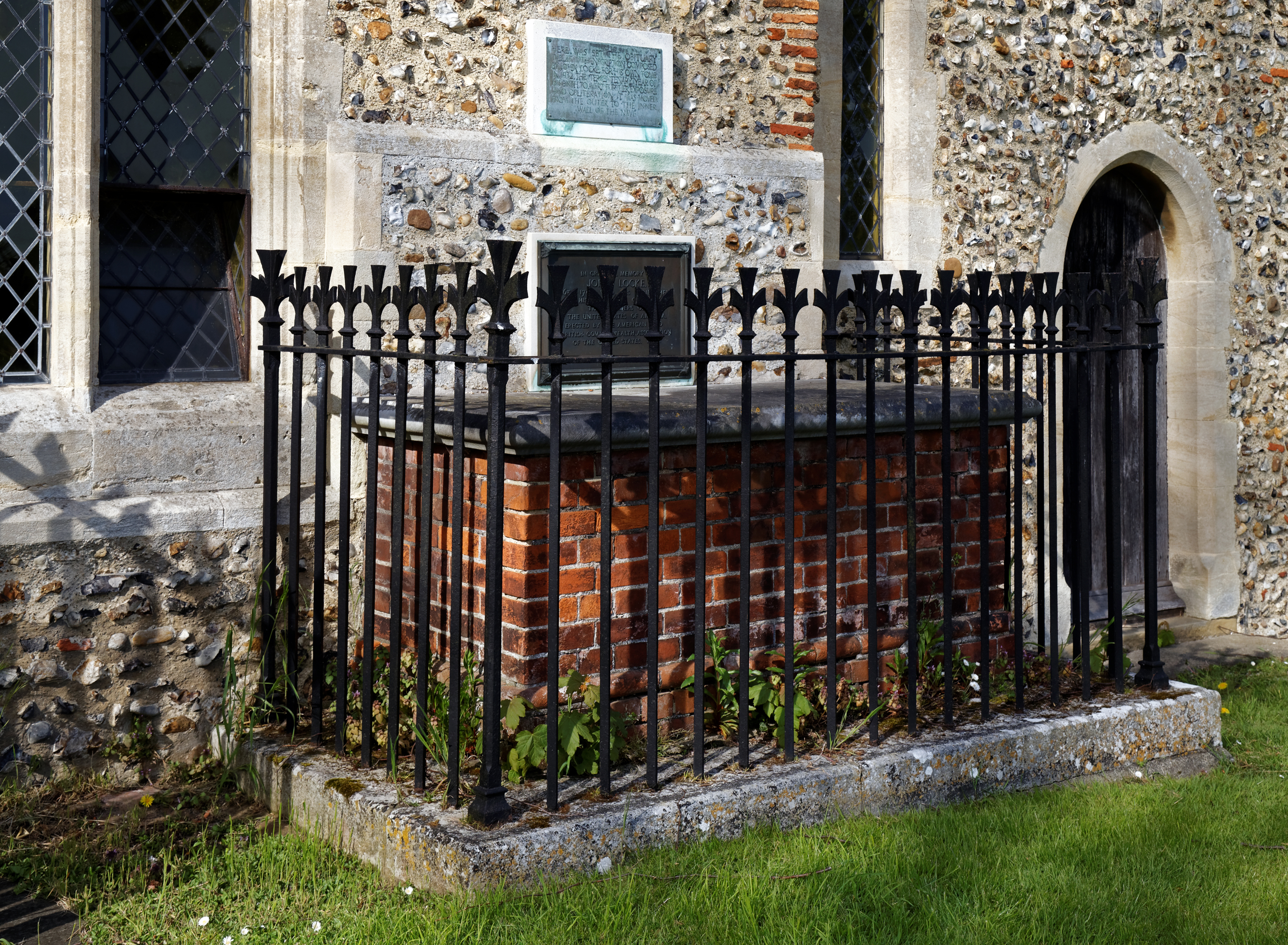
John Locke's tomb

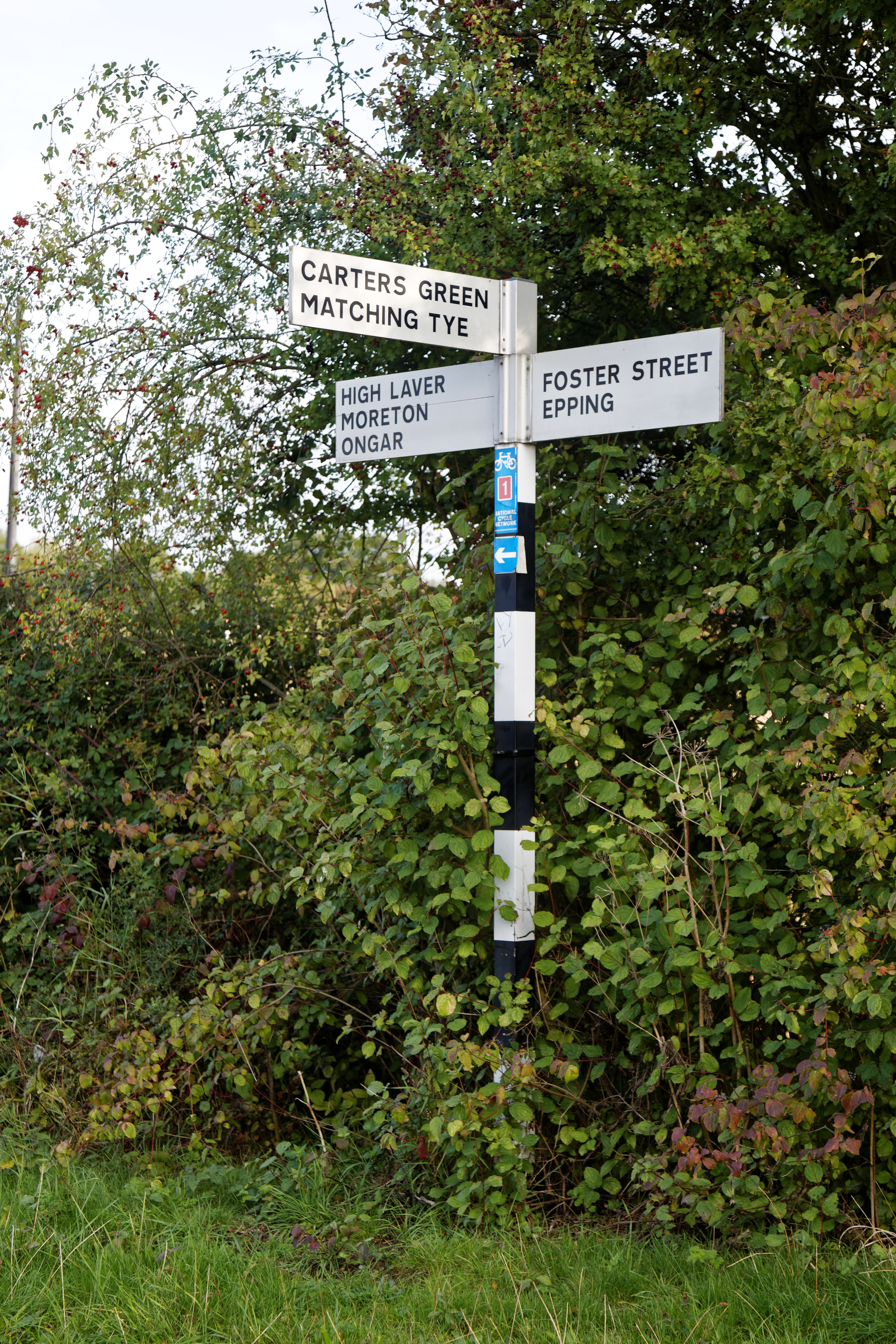
Fingerpost in High Laver parish

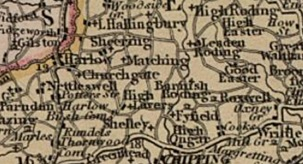
19th-century Ordnance Survey Map of High Laver

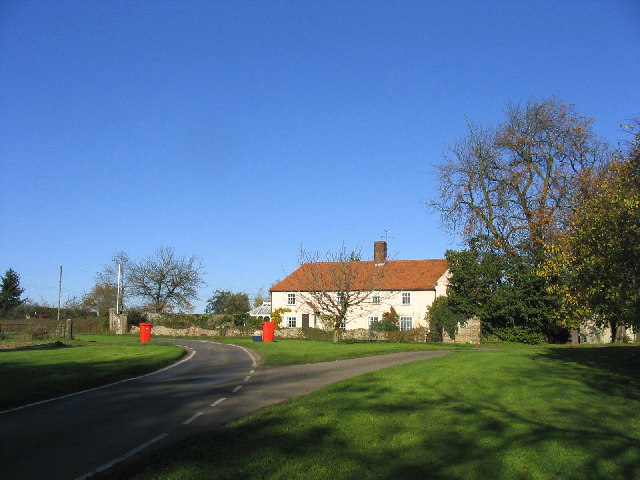
Faggotters Farm, High Laver

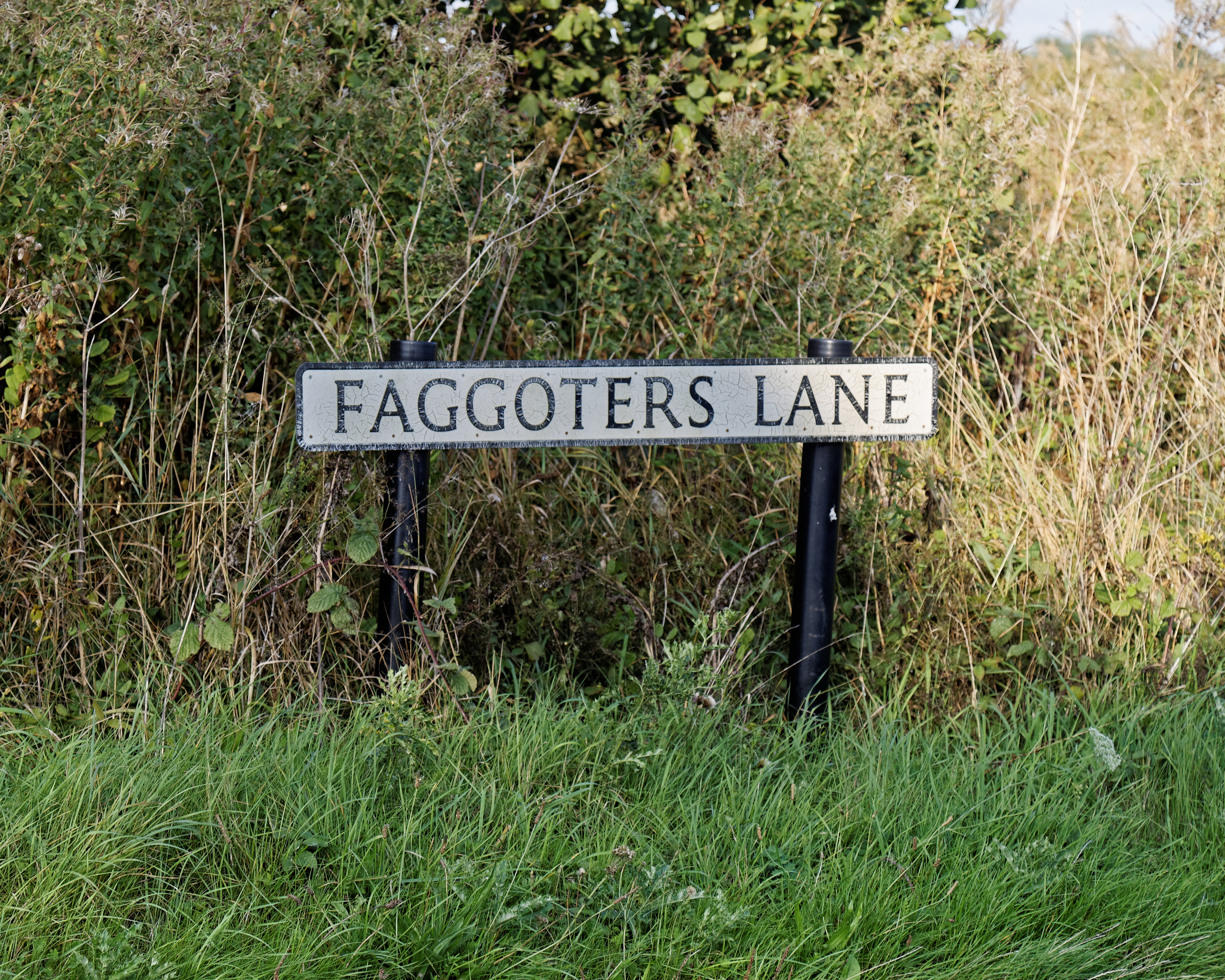
Faggoters Lane sign, High Laver
