= Hunsdon Mead =

Nature reserve in Essex, England

Coordinates: 51.7797°N 0.0541°E

- Site of Special Scientific Interest
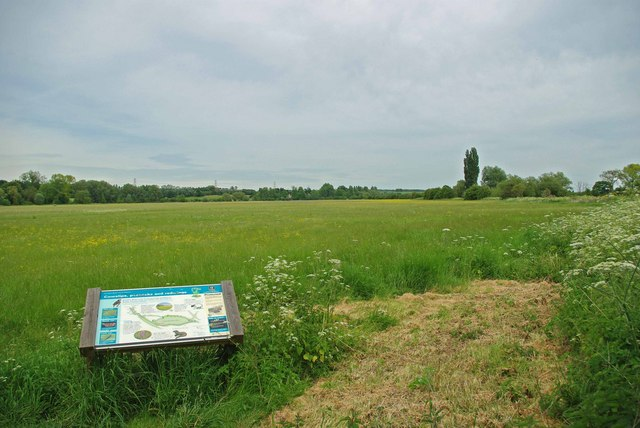
- Location of Hunsdon Mead.
- Area of search: Essex; Hertfordshire
- Grid reference: TL418110
- Interest: Biological
- Area: 34.0 ha (84 acres)
- Notification date: 1984
- Location map: Magic Map

Hunsdon Mead is a 34 hectare biological Site of Special Scientific Interest (SSSI) west of Harlow and east of Roydon in Essex. The site is partly in Essex and partly in Hertfordshire, and it is jointly owned and managed by the Essex Wildlife Trust and the Herts and Middlesex Wildlife Trust. The SSSI also includes part of the neighbouring Roydon Mead. The planning authorities are East Hertfordshire District Council and Epping Forest District Council. Hunsdon Mead is registered common land.

Hunsdon Mead is located between the River Stort and the Stort Navigation. It is unimproved grassland which is subject to winter flooding. As a result of its location and traditional management it supports a number of uncommon plants. Notable grass species include meadow brome and the quaking grass Briza media, and there are other unusual flora such as pepper saxifrage and green-winged orchid. Roydon Mead lies east of the Stort Navigation, and both have large flocks of over-wintering birds.

There is access from the Stort Navigation towpath.

== See also ==
- List of Sites of Special Scientific Interest in Hertfordshire
- List of Sites of Special Scientific Interest in Essex
