= Roughtalley's Wood =

Nature reserve in Essex, England

Coordinates: 51.7114°N 0.153778°E

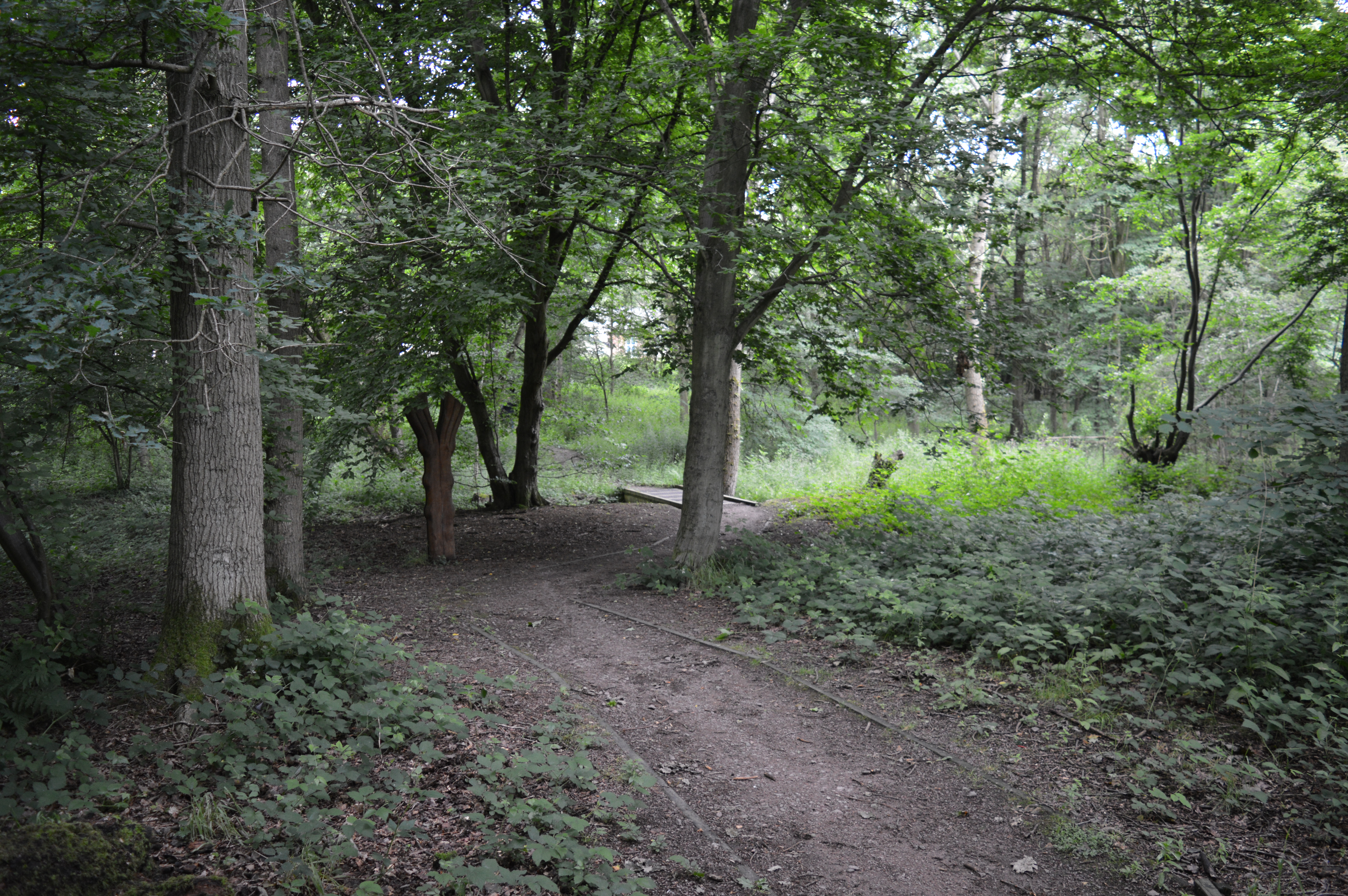
- Interactive map of Roughtalley's Wood
- Type: Local Nature Reserve
- Location: North Weald Bassett, Essex
- OS grid: TL489036
- Area: 3.4 hectares (8.4 acres)
- Manager: Epping Forest District Council

Roughtalley's Wood is a 3.4 hectare Local Nature Reserve in Theydon Garnon parish in Essex, England. It is owned and managed by Epping Forest District Council.

Part of this site is ancient woodland of hornbeam, oak and silver birch, with an understorey which is mainly hazel and hawthorn. The other part is younger woodland which has wildflower glades with orchids such as broad-leaved helleborines, bee orchids and common spotted orchids. There are fauna such as slowworms and grass snakes.

There is access from Pike Way.
