= Weald Common Flood Meadows =

Nature reserve in Essex, England

Coordinates: 51.7138°N 0.16837°E

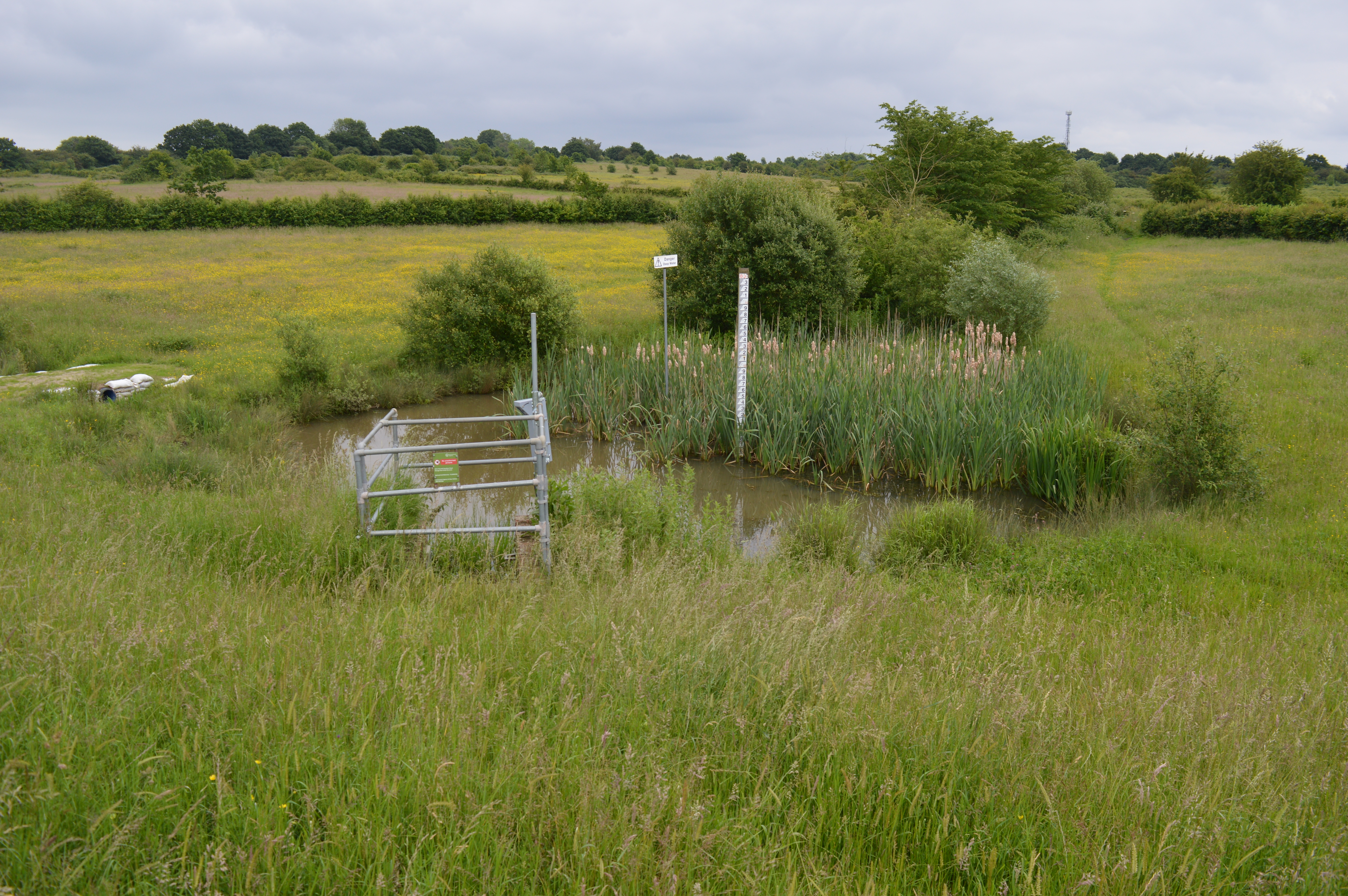
- Interactive map of Weald Common Flood Meadows
- Type: Local Nature Reserve
- Location: North Weald Bassett, Essex
- OS grid: TL499039
- Area: 1.9 hectares (4.7 acres)
- Manager: Epping Forest District Council

Weald Common Flood Meadows is a 1.9 hectare Local Nature Reserve in North Weald Bassett in Essex. It is owned and managed by Epping Forest District Council.

The site consists of two meadows created for flood defence, and managed for biodiversity with the creation of a wet meadow, which is dominated by flowers such as cowslips and ragged robin. Newts and frogs breed in ponds and ditches, and grass snakes and common lizard bask on sunny days.

There is access to the southern area from a track off the High Road next to the village hall, but no public access to the northern area.
