= Chigwell Row Wood =

Nature reserve in Essex, England

Coordinates: 51.6166°N 0.11176°E

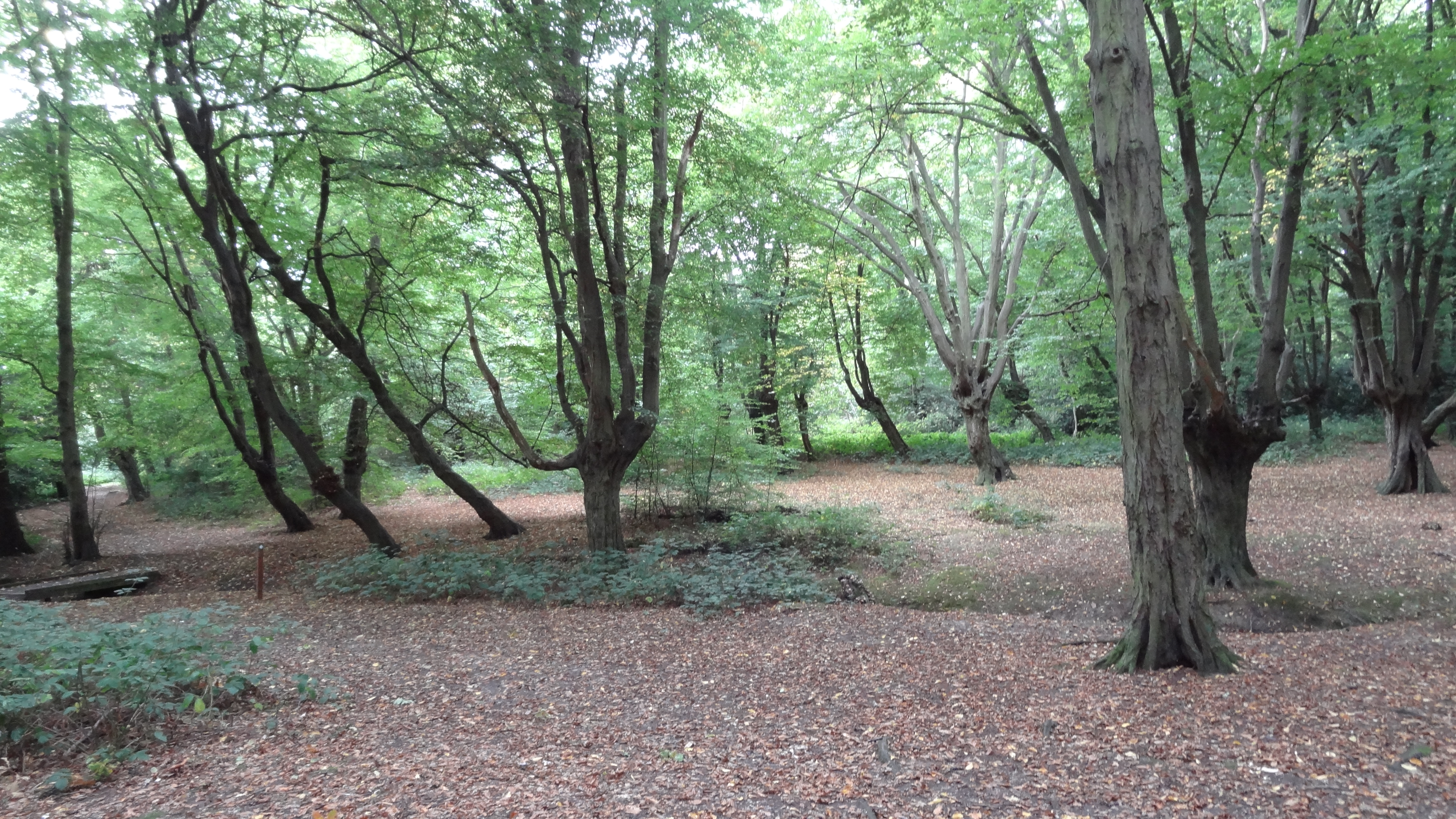
- Interactive map of Chigwell Row Wood
- Type: Local Nature Reserve
- Location: Chigwell, Essex
- OS grid: TQ 460 930
- Area: 14.1 hectares (35 acres)
- Manager: Epping Forest District Council

Chigwell Row Wood is a 14.1 hectare Local Nature Reserve in Chigwell in Epping Forest district, Essex. It is owned by The Chigwell Row Recreation Ground Charity, of which the district council are the trustees, and managed by council staff and volunteers.

The wood is a remnant of the ancient Hainault Forest, and its history can be traced back to the seventeenth century. The trees were traditionally pollarded for fuel, and 366 pollards over 250 years old have been recorded. 75% of these are hornbeam and 20% oak. Over 800 species of invertebrates have been recorded. In the early 2000s heathland areas were suffering from invasive bramble and aspen, and since 2005 clearance of these species has resulted in a return of heathland species.

There is access from a park off Lambourne Road.
