= Molehill Green =

Hamlet in Essex, England

Coordinates: 51.899°N 0.272°E

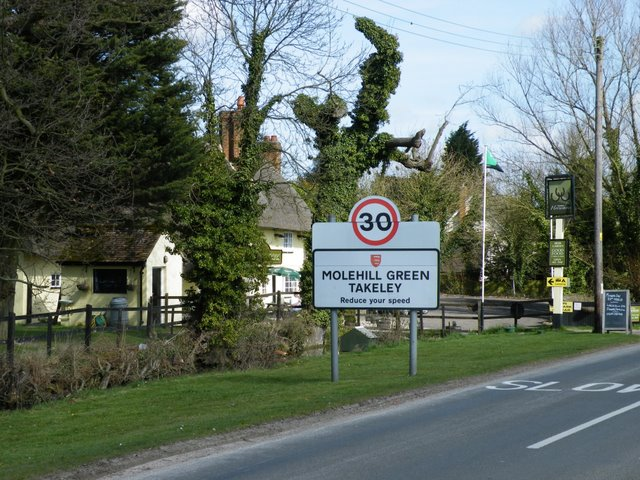

- Location within Essex
- Population: 117
- OS grid reference: TL564247
- Civil parish: Takeley
- District: Uttlesford
- Shire county: Essex
- Region: East
- Country: England
- Sovereign state: United Kingdom
- Post town: Bishop's Stortford
- Postcode district: CM22
- Dialling code: 01279
- Police: Essex
- Fire: Essex
- Ambulance: East of England

Molehill Green is a hamlet in Takeley parish in Essex, England, close to the perimeter of London Stansted Airport, The hamlet consists of approximately forty houses and lies about 2.2 miles (3.5 km) north of Takeley village.

It has one pub called The Three Horseshoes, a small village hall, a shop and a cricket club. Most of the houses are named rather than numbered, and it has only one named street, School Lane. The hamlet was originally called Morrells Green, which is now the name of a small housing estate in Takeley. The River Roding rises from a spring close to the cricket club.

Molehill Green is geographically in Essex but its former postal county is Hertfordshire. Nearby are the hamlets of Chapel End, Broxted, Bamber's Green and the village of Takeley.

There is another Molehill Green in Essex, in Felsted parish.

== Transport ==
Bus services allow travel to Bishop's Stortford, Saffron Walden, Elsenham, Henham and Stansted Mountfitchet.
