= Church Lane Flood Meadow =

Nature reserve in Essex, England

Coordinates: 51.7211°N 0.16148°E

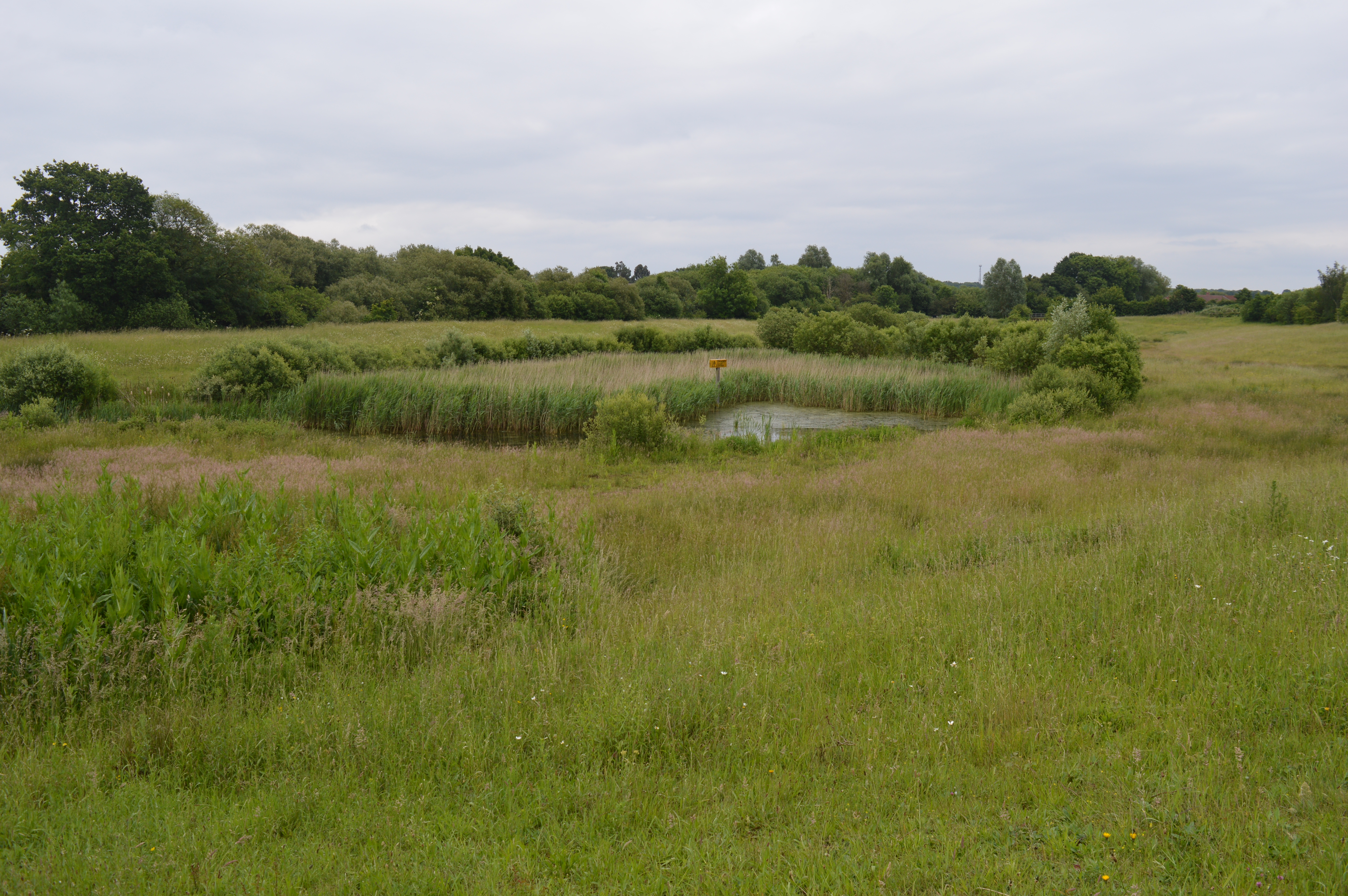
- Interactive map of Church Lane Flood Meadow
- Type: Local Nature Reserve
- Location: North Weald Bassett, Essex
- OS grid: TL494047
- Area: 3.3 hectares (8.2 acres)
- Manager: Epping Forest District Council

Church Lane Flood Meadow is a 3.3 hectare Local Nature Reserve in North Weald Bassett in Essex. It is owned and managed by Epping Forest District Council.

The site was created to relieve flooding in the parish, and it is managed for wildlife. A pond and wet grassland have been created, and over 2,500 native deciduous trees have been planted. Plants include ragged robin and marsh cinquefoil, and 16 butterfly and moth species have been recorded, together with 10 dragonflies and 60 birds.

There is access to footpaths on the site by a footpath from the High Road.
