= Roding Valley Meadows =

Protected area in Essex, England

Coordinates: 51.6284°N 0.0646°E

- Site of Special Scientific Interest
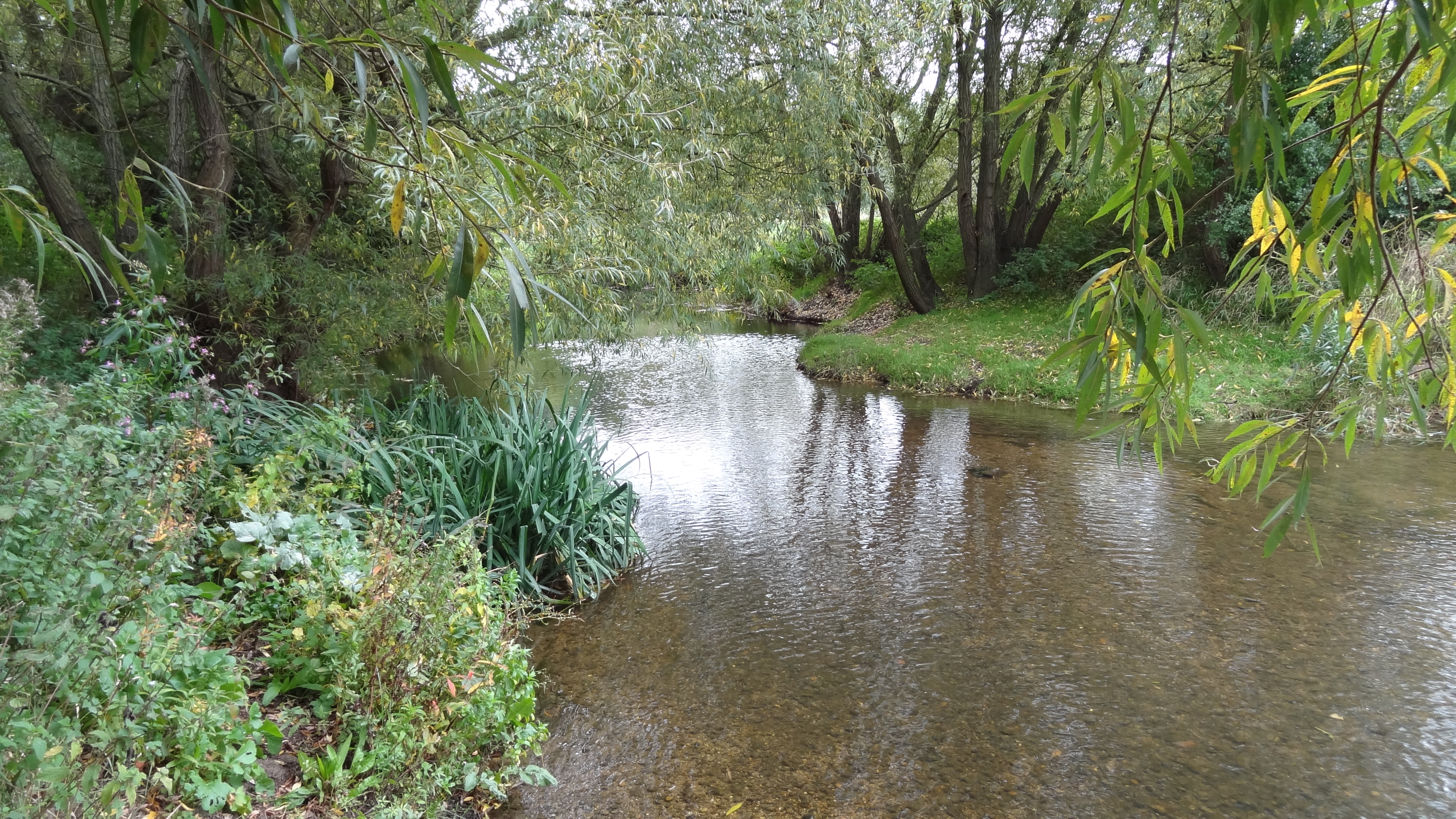
- River Roding in Roding Valley Meadows
- Location of Roding Valley Meadows.
- Area of search: Essex
- Grid reference: TQ 436953
- Interest: Biological
- Area: 19.8 ha (49 acres)
- Notification date: 1987
- Location map: Magic Map

Roding Valley Meadows is an 18.9-hectare (47-acre) biological Site of Special Scientific Interest in Buckhurst Hill in Essex. It is part of a 65.2 hectare Local Nature Reserve with the same name, which is owned by Epping Forest District Council and Grange Farm Trust, and managed by the Essex Wildlife Trust.

The meadows are bordered to the south west by the River Roding. They form one of the largest areas of grassland in Essex which are traditionally managed as hay meadows, flood meadows and marshland. They have a rich variety of plant species, including the largest beds in Essex of the rare brown sedge. The flood meadows have a number of uncommon species, including carex panicea and marsh-marigold. There are nearly ten miles of hedgerows. Management is by hay cutting and grazing by traditional breeds of cattle.

The main car park is on Roding Lane.
