= Bamber's Green =

Hamlet in Essex, England

Coordinates: 51.882°N 0.290°E

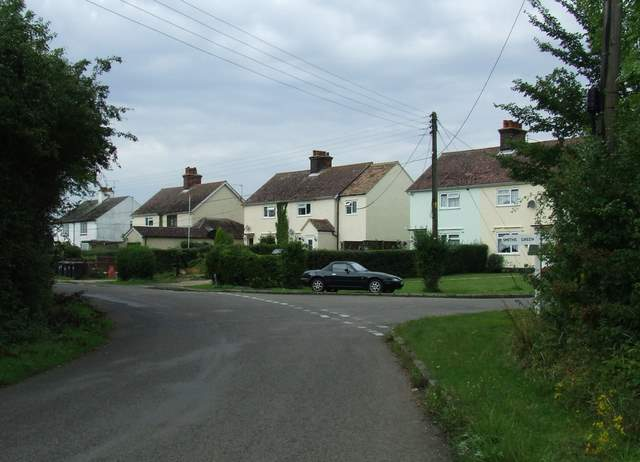

- Location within Essex
- OS grid reference: TL5723
- Shire county: Essex
- Region: East
- Country: England
- Sovereign state: United Kingdom
- Police: Essex
- Fire: Essex
- Ambulance: East of England

Bamber's Green is a hamlet in Essex, England. It is located near to Molehill Green and close to London Stansted Airport. The hamlet has approximately 20 houses, no shops, no pubs, no church or no school. There is however, a small industrial estate adjoining Lathems farm at the junction of the entrance to the village and the road to Molehill Green and Elsenham.
