= Damaris Cudworth Masham =

British philosopher and theologian (1659–1708)

Damaris Masham
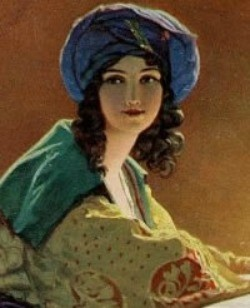
- Born: Damaris Cudworth; 18 January 1659; Cambridge, England
- Died: 20 April 1708 (aged 49); Otes, Essex, England
- Other name: Lady Masham
- Occupation: Philosopher
- Spouse(s): Sir Francis Masham, 3rd Bt (m. 1685)

Philosophical work
- Era: 17th-century philosophy
- Region: Western philosophy
- School: Cambridge Platonists
- Main interests: Metaphysics, Christian theology

Damaris, Lady Masham in Women of History

Damaris Cudworth, Lady Masham (18 January 1659 – 20 April 1708) was an English philosopher, writer, theologian, and advocate for women's education who is often characterized as a proto-feminist. She overcame some weakness of eyesight and lack of access to formal higher education to win high regard among eminent thinkers of her time. With an extensive correspondence, she published two works, A Discourse Concerning the Love of God (1696) and Occasional Thoughts in reference to a Vertuous or Christian Life (1705).

== Family background ==
Damaris Cudworth, known as Lady Masham after her marriage, was born on 18 January 1659, and came from a distinguished, learned family. She was the daughter of the Reverend Professor Ralph Cudworth (1617-88) and his wife, also named Damaris Cudworth, (née Cradock) (d. 1695). Her father had become Master of Christ's College in the University of Cambridge, five years before his daughter's birth. He held this position for the rest of his life and his daughter grew up in a rarefied intellectual environment. A distinguished classicist and Regius Professor of Hebrew, her father had been educated in the non-conforming environment of Emmanuel College during the 1630s. Both his father, a clergyman and royal chaplain, also named Ralph Cudworth) and his stepfather, the clergyman John Stoughton (1593–1639), had previously studied and held Fellowships there, and had successively held the college rectorate of Aller, Somerset (where the younger Ralph had been born). He became a leading figure of the Cambridge Platonist School, and poured immense erudition and originality into his great work, The True Intellectual System of the Universe. Overtly a refutation of atheistic determinism, his work evolved in critique of aspects of Calvinist theology, in the light of his near-contemporary René Descartes, and in opposition to Thomas Hobbes.

Masham's mother, Damaris, daughter of Damaris and Mathew Cradock of London (d. 1641), was first married to London merchant citizen Thomas Andrewes (d. 1653) (son of the Commonwealth Lord Mayor of London Sir Thomas Andrewes), by whom there were several half-brothers and sisters. Her mother's stepmother Rebeccah (widow of Mathew Cradock) later married the Emmanuel College Platonist Benjamin Whichcote, whose niece married her father's friend Dr John Worthington (1657). Through her mother's family, Damaris (Lady Masham) was cousin to Zachary Cradock, Provost of Eton (1680–95), and Samuel Cradock, nonconformist tutor of Wickhambrook, Suffolk (both of whom were educated at Emmanuel College, Cambridge during the 1640s and 1650s).

Masham's half-sister, Damaris Andrewes (d. 1687), married Edward Abney, a student, graduate, and Fellow of Christ's College (from 1649), who had obtained the higher degree of Doctor of both laws (LL.D) and resigned his Fellowship to marry her (1661). Her half-brother, John Andrewes (d. after 1688), also studied at Christ's College (from 1664) and held a Fellowship there (until c.1675). Her other half-brother, Matthew Andrewes (d. 1674), entered Queens' College, Cambridge (1663/64), and was Fellow there at his death. Whilst her brother, Charles Cudworth, who died in India (1684), and for whom Locke observed her tender affection, may have been educated at Trinity College, Cambridge; her other brothers attended Christ's College: John Cudworth (an undergraduate under John Andrewes, and later Fellow and Lecturer in Greek (1672–84)), and Thomas Cudworth.

== Education ==
Although Masham's early life has left no record of formal schooling, the unusual collegiate context of her family environment (and her acquaintance with her father's Platonist circle) gave her advantages and insights in an age when higher education was not normally accessible to women. The claims that she was taught by her father, or owed the development of her thought especially to John Norris (an early associate with whom she came to differ), are to some extent superfluous: she was an intelligent young woman in a brilliant household of academics embedded in the collegiate life. Damaris herself emphasized the importance of the maternal influence on a child's education.

As a young woman, Masham began a correspondence with John Locke. Her early letters show that she was experienced in philosophical discourse, capable in discussion of her father's Platonist views and having knowledge of many Platonist works. By 1682, she was well-read in contemporary philosophy. This was despite a certain weakness of eyesight which affected her ability to read as copiously as she wished. There is no medical record for this: John Norris referred to her 'blindness' in his Reflections upon the Conduct of Human Life (1690), but this was a statement which she, herself, contradicted and corrected him upon. John Locke also referred to her sight in correspondence with Philip van Limborch. Her scholarly calling, itself unusual for a woman in her time, was achieved in spite of this weakness.

== Marriage (1685), motherhood (1686) ==
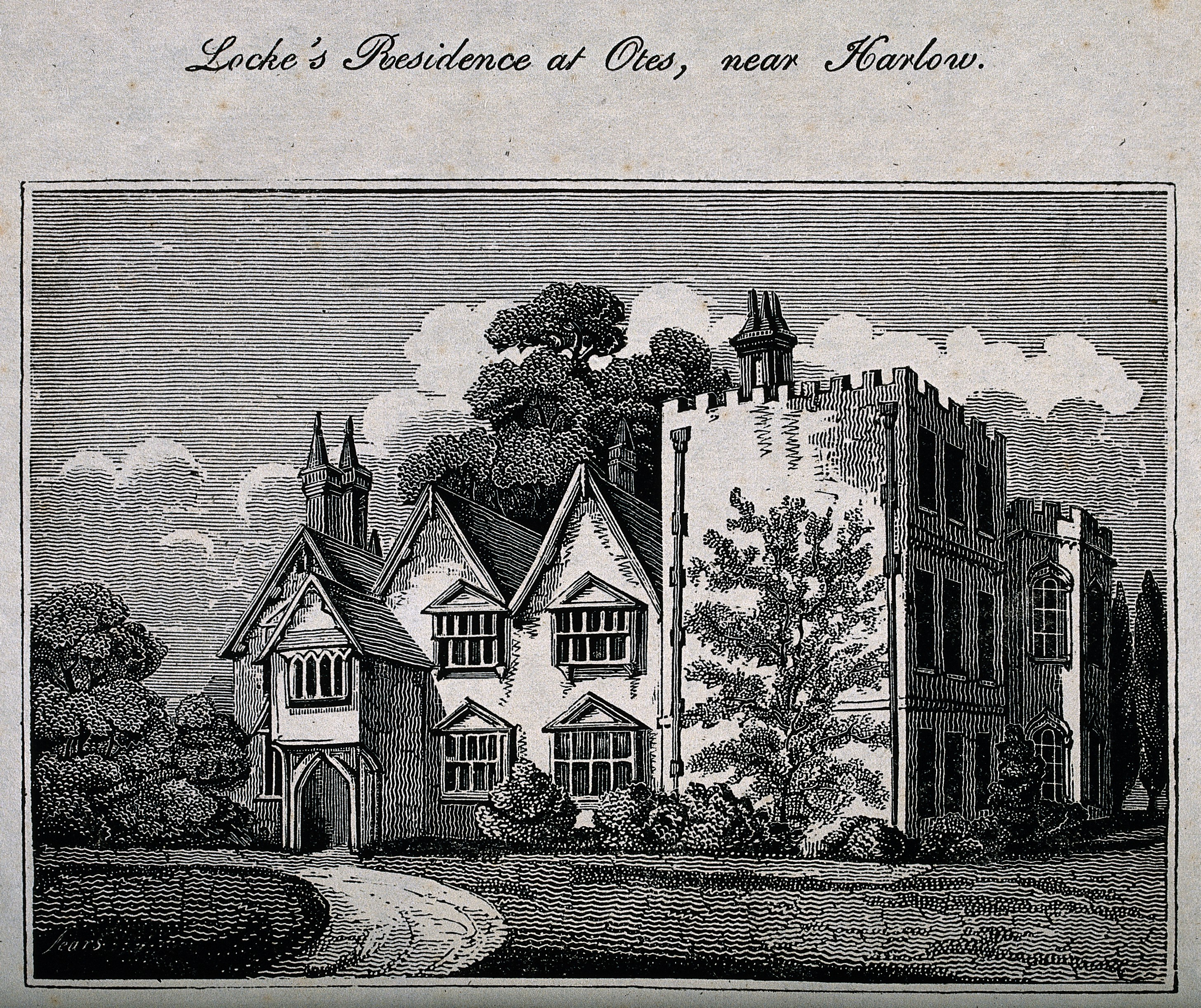
Oates Manor, High Laver, Essex

In 1685, Damaris Cudworth (aged 26) married Sir Francis Masham, 3rd Baronet (c.1646–1723), of the Manor of Oates in High Laver in the county of Essex (she was thereafter styled Lady Masham). Sir Francis was a widower, and had eight children with his late wife, Mary Scott, including the courtier Samuel, 1st Lord Masham (1678/9–1758)). About a year after their marriage, Lord and Lady Masham had their only child together, Francis Cudworth Masham (1686–1731). The marriage provided Lady Masham security, and the household came to accommodate Lady Masham's widowed mother, following her father's death in 1688. He left her such of the English books from his library as she should choose. Her mother maintained close connections with her daughter's household and, when she died (1695), she made extensive provision for her daughter and appointed John Locke, Edward Clarke and Bishop Edward Fowler (her executor) as trustees for the future welfare of her grandson, Francis Cudworth Masham (who later became Accountant-General to the Court of Chancery).

== Correspondence and publications ==
From her early twenties onwards, she maintained a close personal relationship with John Locke (during the remainder of his life). They were probably brought together by a mutual friend, Edward Clarke. They met sometime before 1682, and exchanged many personal, and often flirtatious, letters. Locke described her admirably in a letter to Phillipp van Limborch: “The lady herself is so well versed in theological and philosophical studies, and of such an original mind that you will not find many men to whom she is not superior in wealth of knowledge and ability to profit by it.” She and Locke were of great importance to one another in their friendship and studies, and Locke took up residence in her household, from 1691 until his death in 1704. He brought with him his library (of nearly 2,000 books), purchased for her a writing desk, ink and quills, and paid for the binding of her works. Much of Locke's last will and testament is devoted to gifts, legacies and arrangements for Damaris, Lady Masham and her son, Francis (born 1686). An account of Locke's last day (during which Lady Masham attended him), and of his character, was published in 1705. Constant companions, they exchanged ideas and theories and entertained many other theologians and philosophers (including Sir Isaac Newton and Franciscus Mercurius van Helmont).

During this time she published her first work, A Discourse Concerning the Love of God (1696), which was a response to John Norris's Practical Discourses. Shortly after Locke's death, she published her best-known work, Occasional Thoughts in Reference to a Vertuous or Christian Life (1705). Both were published anonymously, to avoid prejudice or irrelevant courtesy towards a woman scholar: Pierre Bayle (who easily ascertained her authorship) hastened to amend one of his previous (careless) observations, concerning her father's work, with an elaborate (and probably) sincere compliment upon her Savoir and other perfections. Her correspondence with Leibniz explored their respective theories, including the latter's work on Pre-established harmony, on her father Ralph Cudworth's work, and on the relationship between body and soul.

== Death (1708), memorial, and portraits ==
Near the end of her life Masham, suffering from intense pain due to gallstones, traveled to Bath hoping to improve her condition. Damaris Cudworth Masham died at Otes (20 April 1708), and was buried in the middle aisle of Bath Abbey. Over her grave it was written of 'her Learning, Judgement, Sagacity, and Penetration together with her Candor and Love of Truth (Ballard, 337).

=== Portraits ===
No extant portraits of Damaris Cudworth Masham are known. According to an inventory, her mother owned a portrait, and John Locke ordered one from Sir Godfrey Kneller (1704), but both appear to have been lost.

== Philosophy and advocacy ==
Often touted as the "Lockean feminist" by scholars (such as Jaqueline Broad and Lois Frankel), Damaris Cudworth Masham's public works consisted of a mix between her own proto-feminist ideals, advocacy her father's Platonism, and Lockean theories and arguments. She criticized the double standard of men and women's moralities and women's lack of access to higher education.

In her Occasional Thoughts in reference to a Vertuous or Christian Life (1705), Damaris Cudworth Masham makes two important points regarding the inferior education given to women. Firstly, she argues that giving an inferior education to women leaves them unfit to be able to give their children a proper education (since most children, during this period, were given early education by their mothers and education was still mostly reserved for members of the elite). She writes,

“The improvements of Reason, however requisite to Ladies for their Accomplishment, as rational Creatures; and however needful to them for the well Educating of their Children, and to their being useful in their Families, yet are rarely any recommendation of them to Men; who foolishly thinking, that Money will answer to all things, do, for the most part, regard nothing else in the Woman they would Marry … Girls, betwixt silly Fathers and ignorant Mothers, are generally so brought up, that traditionary Opinions are to them, all their lives long, instead of Reason."

Here, Damaris Cudworth Masham argued that it would be a benefit to all mankind should women be allowed access to higher education since it would allow them to educate better their children and advance reason in society.

Secondly, Cudworth argued that women should have access to education for not only their children's spiritual welfare but for their own. She argued that “Women have Souls to be sav’d as well as Men,” and that, by being blessed with rational thinking, it was imperative for women to understand the principles and values behind their own religious beliefs. “They [women] are, perhaps sometimes told in regard of what Religion exacts, They must Believe and Do such and such things, because the Word of God requires it; but they are not put upon searching the Scriptures themselves, to see whether, or no, these things are so." She further argued that a woman's duty and knowledge should not be grounded on the "uncertain and variable Opinions of Men" but that they should, instead, be able to nurture their minds as well as their bodies and form their own opinions about spirituality.

== Influence on other philosophers ==
Damaris Cudworth Masham's work and correspondence with many of the great philosophers of the Enlightenment may be argued to have influenced their resulting published works. Most notably, it is surmised that she influenced Locke's second revision of An Essay Concerning Human Understanding. Locke worked on various revisions of this treatise (between 1689 until his death in 1704), during which time he resided, with the Mashams, at their manor of Oates, High Laver, Essex. Thus, it is likely that Damaris Cudworth would have had some intellectual influence over aspects of these revisions. In revising the section "Of Power", Locke seems to adopt many of Ralph Cudworth's ideas (and especially those contained in his unpublished manuscripts, which are considered the second and third parts to his The True Intellectual System of the Universe (1678)). Even though these manuscripts are not believed to have been in Damaris's possession until the death of her elder brother, John Cudworth (1726), the influence of Ralph Cudworth's ideas upon Locke's work cannot be ignored, and has led some historians to believe that it was Damaris Cudworth Masham herself (familiar with her father's works) who may have influenced Locke during this second revision of "Of Power." Damaris Cudworth Masham did make parallels to her father's ideas on free will (contained in his third manuscript), which appear in her publication Occasional Thoughts,

"without a capacity in the Creature to act contrary to the Will of the Creator there could be no desert, or self-excellency in any Created Being; contrariety to the Will of God is therefore permitted in the Universe as a necessary result of Creaturely imperfection, under the greatest endowment that a Created Being is capable of having, viz. That of Freedom or Liberty of Action."

Thereby indicating that her father was likely to have passed-on many of his ideas, regarding free will and the rejection of determinism, to Damaris (either directly through the reading of his manuscripts or indirectly from her education in philosophical discourse).

== Works ==
- A discourse concerning the Love of God (A. and J. Churchill at the Black-Swan in Paternoster-Row, London 1696). Earlymoderntexts.com edition
- Occasional Thoughts in reference to a Vertuous or Christian Life (Awnsham and John Churchill at the Black-Swan in Paternoster-Row, London 1705). At Project Gutenberg (accessed 8 December 2014). Earlymoderntexts.com edition
- Briefwechsel zwischen Leibniz und Lady Masham. 1703–1705. In: Gottfried Wilhelm Leibniz: Philosophische Schriften (Weidmannsche Buchhandlung, Berlin 1887), vol. 3, pp. 331–375. [Leibniz writes in French, Lady Masham answers in English. Volume online.]

== Ancestry ==
Ancestors of Damaris Cudworth Masham

8. Ralph Cudworth (d.1572) of Werneth, Oldham
4. Ralph Cudworth (1572/3–1624)
9. Jane Assheton
2. Ralph Cudworth (1617–88)
10. Matthew Machell (c.1549–93) of London
5. Mary Machell (c. 1582–1634)
11. Mary Lewkenor
1. Damaris Cudworth Masham
6. Matthew Cradock (d.1641) of London
3. Damaris Cradock Andrewes (d.1695)
7. Damaris
