= Epping Civic Offices =

Municipal building in Epping, Essex, England

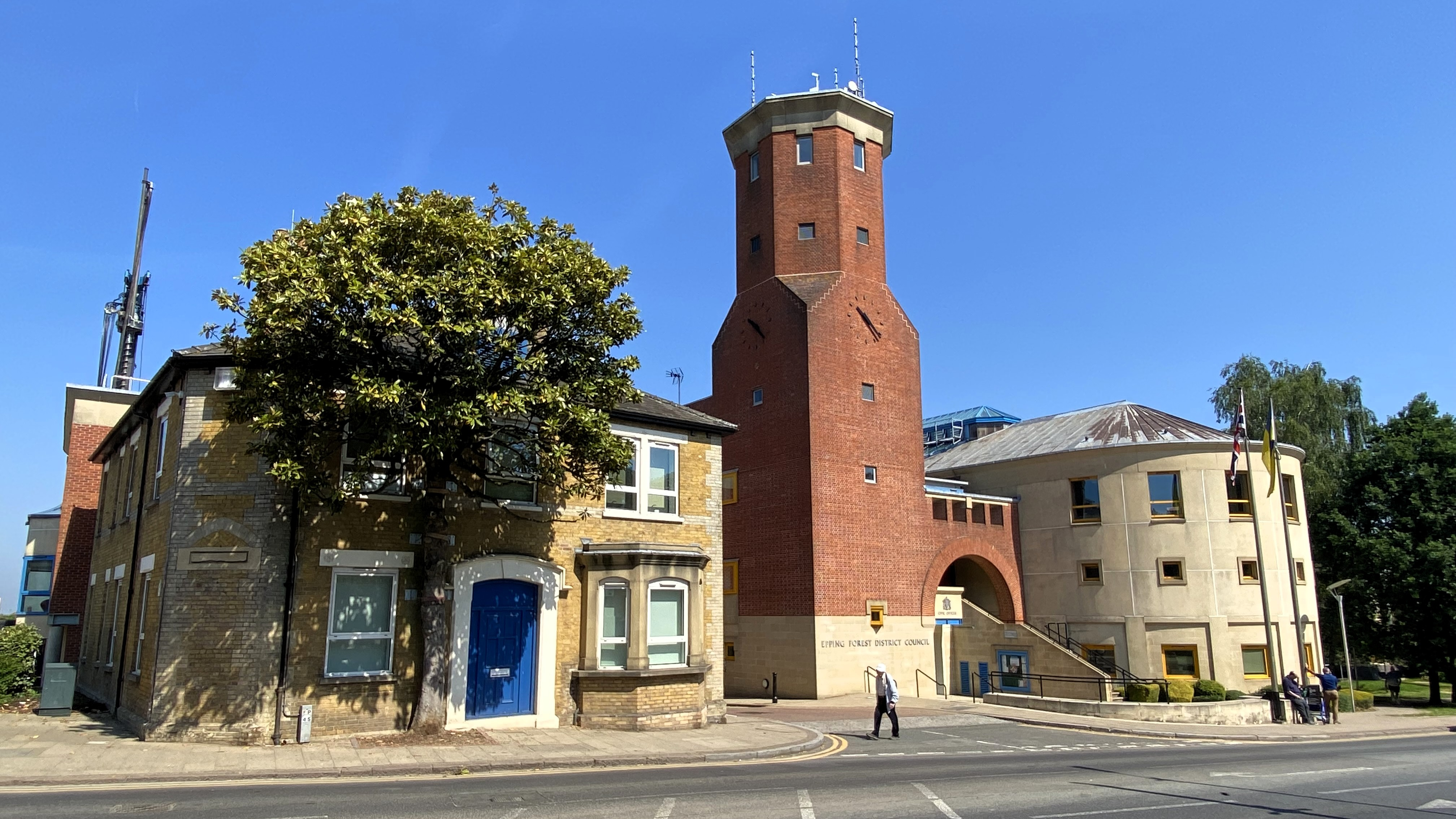
- The offices in 2023

- Shown in Essex
- 51.7016°N 0.1146°E
- Location: High Street, Epping

History
- Built: 1992

Site notes
- Architectural style: Postmodern style

Listed Building – Grade II
- Official name: Epping Civic Offices
- Designated: 18 December 2017
- Reference no.: 1451630

Epping Civic Offices is a municipal building in Epping, Essex, a town in England. The building, which accommodates the headquarters of Epping Forest District Council, is a grade II listed building.

== History ==
After the Epping Union and Rural Sanitary Authority was succeeded by Epping Urban District Council in 1896, the council decided to use Epping Town Hall as its offices and meeting place. However, the company that had developed the town hall got into financial difficulties and the council had to use temporary facilities for its meetings, before relocating to Hawthorn Lodge on the opposite side of the High Street. Hawthorn Lodge continued to serve as the headquarters of the council for much of the 20th century, but ceased to be the local seat of government when the enlarged Epping Forest District Council was formed at No. 323 High Street in Epping in 1974.

By the late 1980s, the council needed more substantial offices. The council held a two-stage competition, judged by Piers Gough. It received 51 entries, and the winner was Richard Reid and Associates, with a postmodern design. This incorporated the existing mid-19th century house, No. 323 High Street, which the council occupied, and an office block, built in the 1970s, which the council also occupied. Work on the new building started in 1987. Ove Arup and Partners acted as the structural engineers, and the building was completed in 1992.

In 2021, the council refurbished the building, removing some corridors to create open-plan offices, and creating a community hub and new meeting and conference spaces. Following the refurbishment, the council sought to let the top floor to private companies.

== Architecture ==
The central part of the building is a three-storey office block, with a concrete frame, and brick and stone cladding. To its south-west is a two-storey, three-bay former house, No. 323 High Street, converted into offices, and to its rear is a 1970s three-storey, rectangular office block. The three are connected by first- and second-floor corridors, while at ground floor level there is vehicular access to the rear car park. Attached to the front of the building is a tall red-brick tower, rectangular at ground level, but octagonal in top two stages. The tower has a stone cornice, and minimalist clocks on four sides. North-east of the tower is a brick arch, providing access to the reception area, with a balcony above, and stone steps providing direct access to the council chamber and its gallery. These are in a bow-fronted section, clad in reconstituted stone, with ground floor pilasters. Further to the north-east is a seven-bay section with two oriel windows, and then a four-bay section placed further forward, again clad in stone, containing the staff canteen and council members' room.

After the building was completed a series of letters criticising the design appeared in local newspapers. However, the project won a Regional Award (East Anglia) from the Royal Institute of British Architects in 1993, and the architectural historian, Charles Jencks, described the design as a "superb example…of contextualism". The building was grade II listed in 2017.
