= Linder's Field =

Nature reserve in Buckhurst Hill, Essex, UK

Coordinates: 51.6315°N 0.04306°E

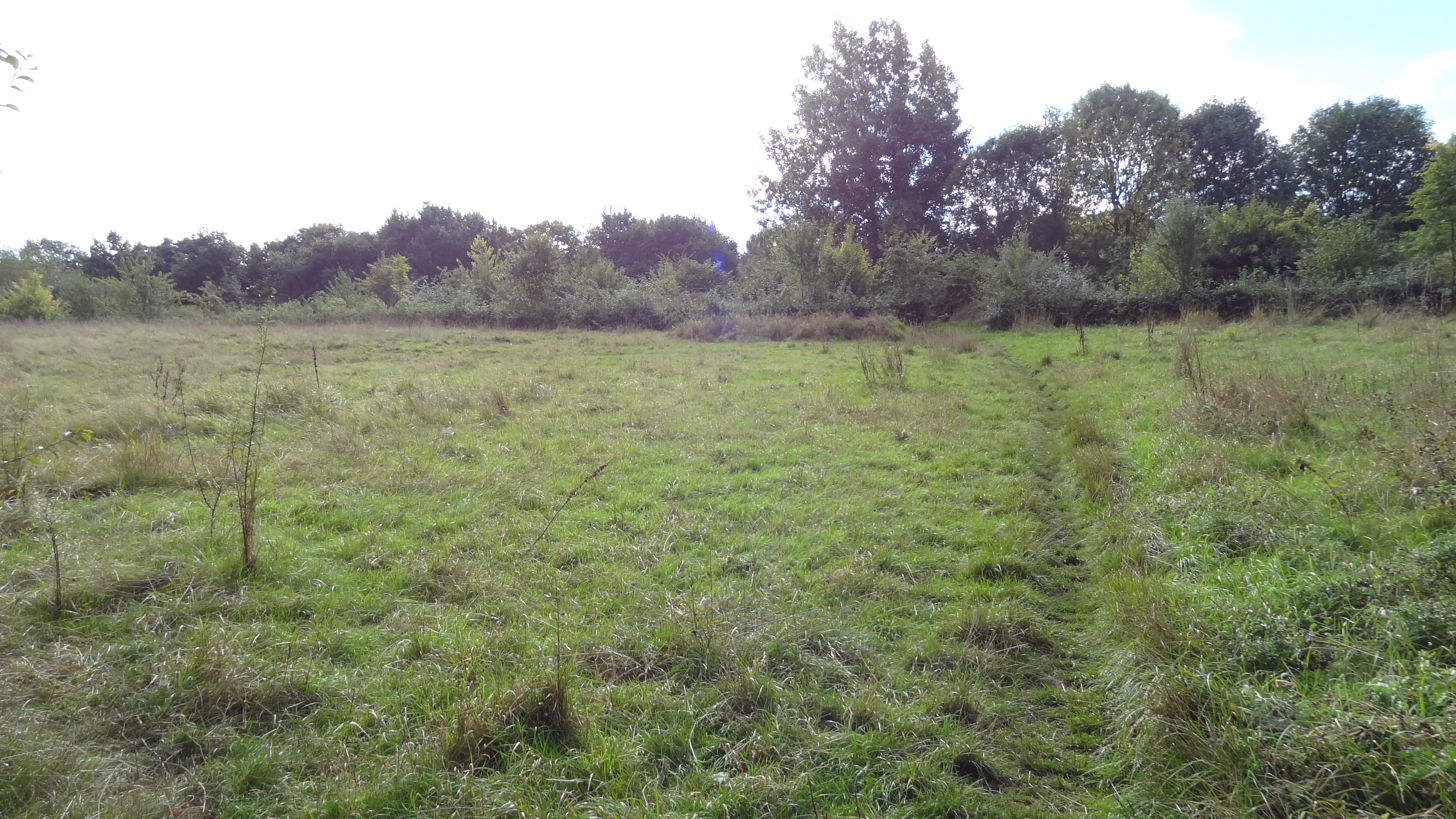
- Interactive map of Linder's Field
- Type: Local Nature Reserve
- Location: Buckhurst Hill, Essex
- OS grid: TQ415944
- Area: 3.6 ha (8.9 acres)
- Manager: Epping Forest District Council

Linder's Field is a 3.6-hectare (8.9-acre) Local Nature Reserve in Buckhurst Hill in Essex. It is owned and managed by Epping Forest District Council.

Linder's Field is a surviving fragment of an ancient wood called Pluckett's Wood. It is named after its former owner, Charles Linder. In 1956 he granted the site to Chigwell Council (which later became Epping Forest Council) for 35 years, and in 1963 his family handed over the site permanently. It was designated a Local Nature Reserve in 2000.

The site has ancient woodland, scrub, grassland and ponds. The ponds have frogs, toads and newts, and bats forage in the hedgerows. Plants include bluebells and wood anemones. It also has a wildflower meadow which is an important habitat for many species of invertebrates, birds and mammals.

The main entrance is in Roebuck Lane.
