= Little Laver =

Village in Essex, England

Coordinates: 51.763°N 0.238°E

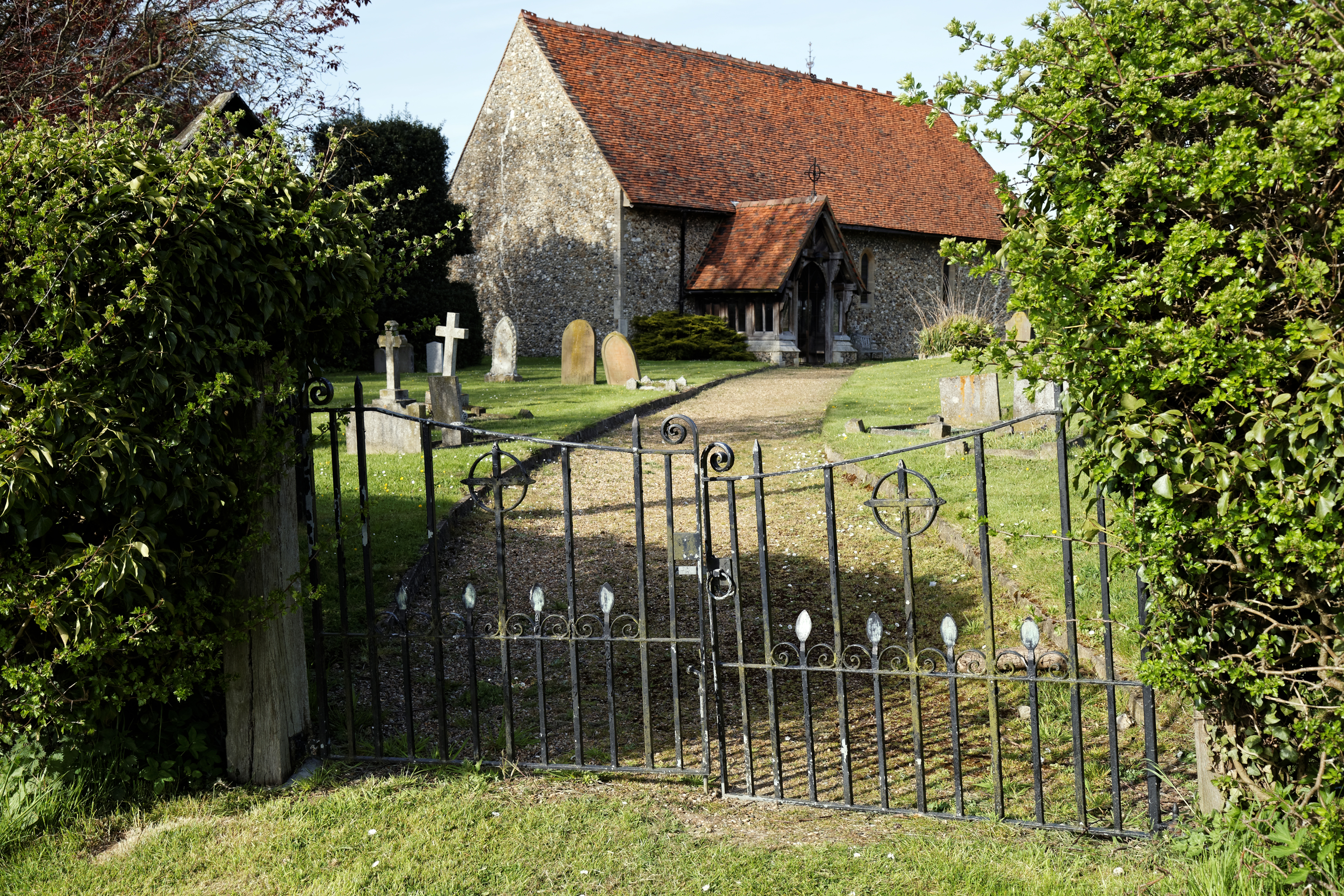
- Church of St Mary the Virgin, Little Laver

- Location within Essex
- Population: 102 (Parish, 2021)
- OS grid reference: TL547094
- Civil parish: Little Laver
- District: Epping Forest
- Shire county: Essex
- Region: East
- Country: England
- Sovereign state: United Kingdom
- Post town: Ongar
- Postcode district: CM5
- Police: Essex
- Fire: Essex
- Ambulance: East of England

Little Laver is a village and a civil parish in the Epping Forest district of Essex, England. At the 2021 census the parish had a population of 102.

Little Laver's parish church is dedicated to St Mary the Virgin.

At the end of the 19th century, Little Laver's population fell just below 100 households and has since remained about this level.
