= Richard Reid (architect) =

English architect (born 1939)

Richard Stuart Reid (born March 1939) is an English architect.

Born in England, Reid studied architecture at the Northern Polytechnic, before in 1965 becoming a planning officer at the Corporation of London. In 1968, he was awarded the Rome Scholarship in Architecture and studied for a year at the Accademia Britannica in Rome. On returning to the UK, he became a lecturer at Kingston Polytechnic, later moving to the Polytechnic of the South Bank. During this period, he wrote numerous newspaper and magazine articles on architecture, also producing illustrations for these outlets. He also wrote books on English architecture, including The Shell Book of Cottages and The Georgian House. Around the end of the decade, he became director of a major European research project, "Learning from Vernacular Building and Planning".

In 1984, Reid founded his own architectural firm, Richard Reid and Associates, based in Sevenoaks. This won competitions for the masterplan of the Kleinzschocher district of Leipzig, the Bertalia-Lazzaretto District district of Bologna, and Nansha Bay in China. His buildings, often in the postmodern style, include Finland Quay West, and Epping Civic Offices.
