= River Roding =

River in Essex and Greater London, England

River Roding (Barking Creek)
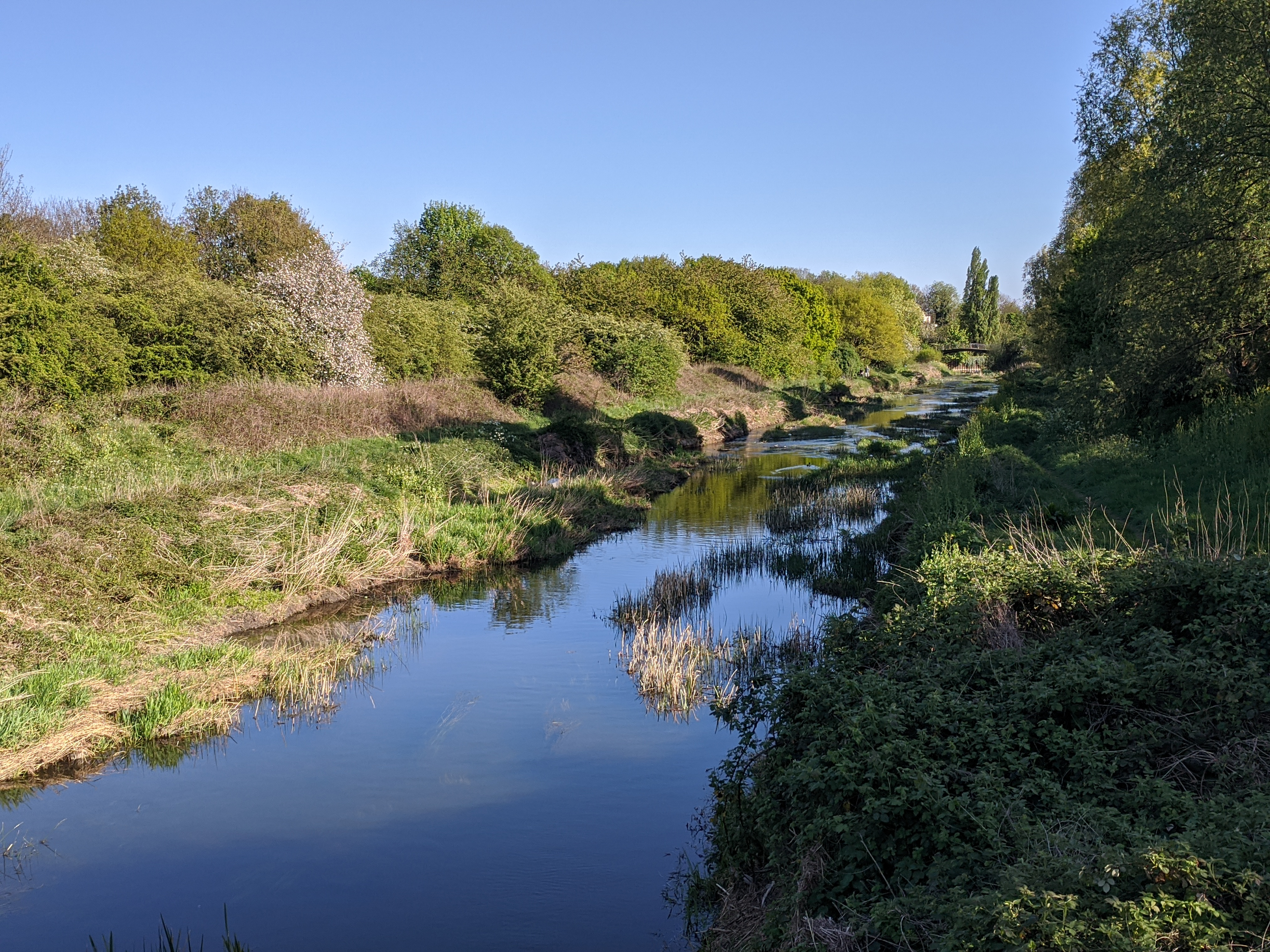
- River Roding between Redbridge and South Woodford

Location
- Country: England
- Counties: Essex, Greater London
- Districts / Boroughs: Epping Forest, Uttlesford, Redbridge, Newham, Barking and Dagenham
- Towns: The Rodings, Chipping Ongar, Loughton, Woodford Green, Ilford, Barking

Physical characteristics
- Source
  - location: Molehill Green, Essex
  - coordinates: 51.8993°N 0.2778°E
  - elevation: 93 m (305 ft)
- Mouth: River Thames
  - location: Creekmouth
  - coordinates: 51.5142°N 0.0993°E
  - elevation: 0 m (0 ft)
- Length: 50 km (31 mi)
- Discharge
  - location: Redbridge
  - average: 1.85 m^{3}/s (65 cu ft/s)
  - minimum: 0.08 m^{3}/s (2.8 cu ft/s)13 August 1990
  - maximum: 62.4 m^{3}/s (2,200 cu ft/s)22 November 1974
- Discharge
  - location: Loughton
  - average: 1.41 m^{3}/s (50 cu ft/s)
- Discharge
  - location: High Ongar
  - average: 0.48 m^{3}/s (17 cu ft/s)

The River Roding (/ˈroʊdɪŋ/) is a river that rises at Molehill Green, Essex, England. It then flows south through Essex and London, forming Barking Creek as it reaches the River Thames.

== Course ==
The river leaves Molehill Green and passes through or near a group of eight or nine villages in Essex known collectively as the Rodings, as their names are 'Roding' prefixed with various different specific names (High, Margaret, Aythorpe, etc.). After Chipping Ongar, the river flows under the M25 motorway by Passingford Bridge and Abridge.

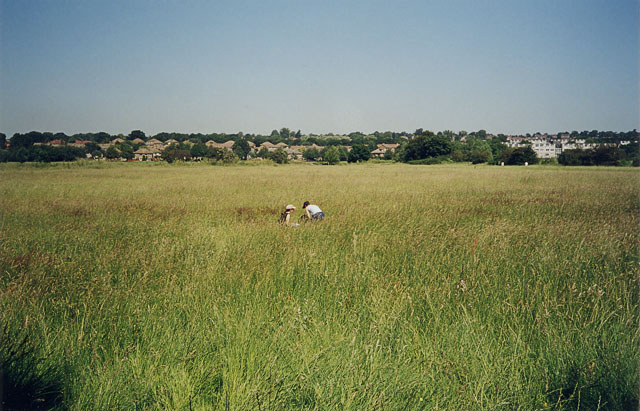
Flood meadows by the river near Chigwell, looking towards Loughton, at Roding Valley Meadows Nature Reserve

The river then runs between Loughton and Chigwell, where the Roding Valley Meadows make up the largest surviving area of traditionally managed river-valley habitat in Essex. This nature reserve consists of unimproved wet and dry hay meadows, rich with flora and fauna and bounded by thick hedgerows, scrubland, secondary woodland and tree plantation. The meadows stretch down to the M11 motorway and the Roding Valley tube station is situated close to the area, although Loughton or Buckhurst Hill are better placed for a visit. The river then enters Woodford.

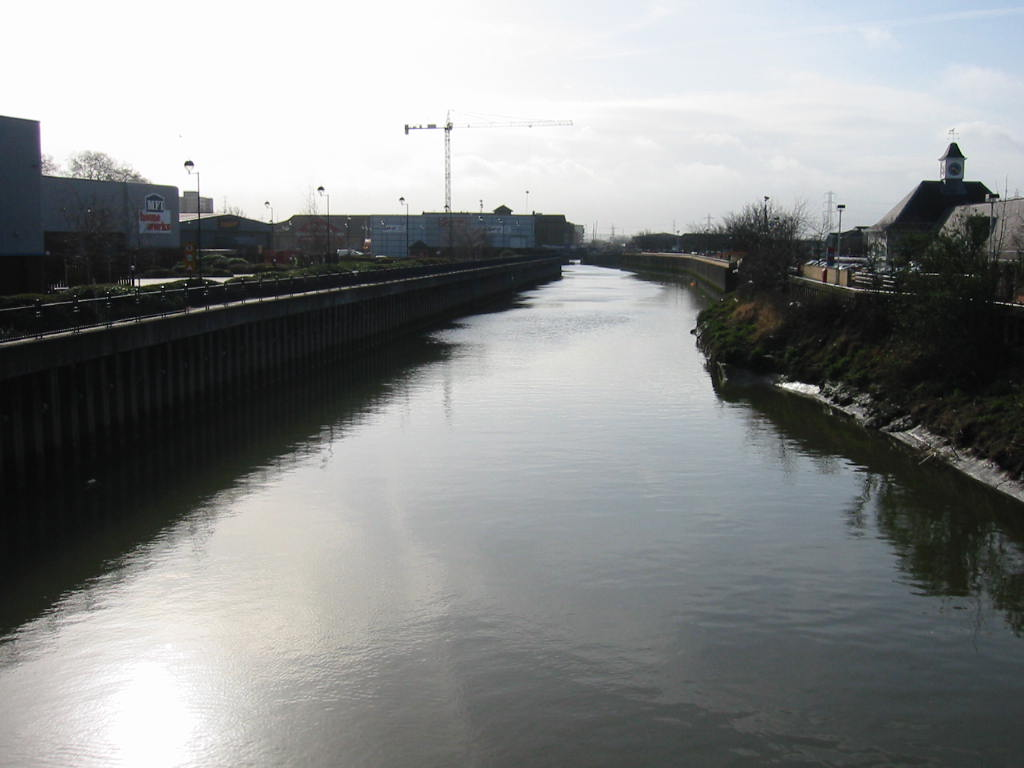
The river just before reaching the Thames at Barking

Redbridge takes its name from a crossing of the river which then passes through Ilford and Barking near the A406 North Circular Road. The River Roding through Ilford project is a government-backed scheme to improve amenities along this stretch of the river. After Barking, the tidal section is known as Barking Creek, which flows into the Thames at Creekmouth, where the Barking Barrier acts as a flood defence.

== As a boundary ==
In Essex the river forms part of the boundary between the district of Epping Forest and borough of Brentwood. The river marks the southernmost part of the boundary between the London Borough of Newham and the London Borough of Barking and Dagenham.

== Former name ==
Ilford takes its name from Ilefort, "ford on the River Hyle", which was the ancient name for the lower part of the Roding, based on an earlier Celtic word.

== River Roding Trust ==
In the summer of 2017 the Friends of the River Roding was formed, as an unincorporated association, to channel a community-led effort to restore the River Roding, focusing around Barking and Ilford areas. In July 2019 the association became a registered charity in the form of the River Roding Trust.

Since then the trust has been preserving and restoring the river with projects and activities of a charitable nature, and assisting in educating the public about the history of the river.

In June 2026, 40-year-old barrister Paul Powlesland faced prosecution by the Environment Agency (EA) for operating without an environmental permit. Powlesland had organised a team of volunteers to remove 200 bags of rubbish, branches and silt from the river, after the EA had failed to act. The EA alleged that unauthorised dredging had taken place, with waste left within the flood plain, constituting a flood risk.

== See also ==
- Tributaries of the River Thames
- List of rivers of England
- Wanstead Sewage Works

Next confluence upstream	River Thames	Next confluence downstream
River Lea (north)	River Roding	Wogebourne (south)
