= List of United Kingdom locations: Thi-Thw =

The United Kingdom

This is part of the list of United Kingdom locations: a gazetteer of place names in the United Kingdom showing each place's locality and geographical coordinates.

== Thi ==
Location	Locality	Coordinates (links to map & photo sources)	OS grid reference
Thicket Mead	Bath and North East Somerset	51.29°N 02.48°W	ST6655
Thick Hollins	Kirklees	53.58°N 01.85°W	SE1010
Thickthorn Hall	Norfolk	52.59°N 01.20°E	TG1705
Thickwood	Wiltshire	51.44°N 02.26°W	ST8272
Thimbleby	Lincolnshire	53.20°N 00.15°W	TF2369
Thimbleby	North Yorkshire	54.34°N 01.32°W	SE4495
Thimble End	Birmingham	52.54°N 01.80°W	SP1394
Thinford	Durham	54.70°N 01.56°W	NZ2834
Thingley	Wiltshire	51.42°N 02.15°W	ST8970
Thingwall	Wirral	53.34°N 03.09°W	SJ2784
Thirdpart	North Ayrshire	55.70°N 04.89°W	NS1849
Thirlby	North Yorkshire	54.24°N 01.26°W	SE4884
Thirlestane	Scottish Borders	55.71°N 02.70°W	NT5647
Thirn	North Yorkshire	54.26°N 01.67°W	SE2185
Thirsk	North Yorkshire	54.23°N 01.35°W	SE4282
Thirtleby	East Riding of Yorkshire	53.78°N 00.22°W	TA1734
Thistleton	Lancashire	53.82°N 02.91°W	SD4037
Thistleton	Rutland	52.74°N 00.65°W	SK9117
Thistley Green	Essex	51.84°N 00.46°E	TL7019
Thistley Green	Suffolk	52.35°N 00.45°E	TL6776
Thixendale	North Yorkshire	54.03°N 00.71°W	SE8461

== Tho ==
Location	Locality	Coordinates (links to map & photo sources)	OS grid reference
Thockrington	Northumberland	55.10°N 02.07°W	NY9579
Tholomas Drove	Cambridgeshire	52.63°N 00.06°E	TF4006
Tholthorpe	North Yorkshire	54.08°N 01.28°W	SE4766
Thomas Chapel	Pembrokeshire	51.73°N 04.75°W	SN1008
Thomas Close	Cumbria	54.75°N 02.88°W	NY4340
Thomastown	Rhondda, Cynon, Taff	51.57°N 03.44°W	ST0087
Thompson	Norfolk	52.52°N 00.81°E	TL9196
Thomshill	Moray	57.59°N 03.32°W	NJ2157
Thong	Kent	51.40°N 00.39°E	TQ6770
Thongsbridge	Kirklees	53.57°N 01.77°W	SE1509
Thoralby	North Yorkshire	54.27°N 02.00°W	SE0086
Thoresby	Nottinghamshire	53.23°N 01.05°W	SK6371
Thoresthorpe	Lincolnshire	53.27°N 00.17°E	TF4577
Thoresway	Lincolnshire	53.44°N 00.25°W	TF1696
Thorganby	Lincolnshire	53.45°N 00.19°W	TF2097
Thorganby	North Yorkshire	53.86°N 00.95°W	SE6941
Thorgill	North Yorkshire	54.35°N 00.92°W	SE7096
Thorington	Suffolk	52.31°N 01.54°E	TM4274
Thorington Street	Suffolk	51.97°N 00.92°E	TM0135
Thorlby	North Yorkshire	53.96°N 02.06°W	SD9652
Thorley	Hertfordshire	51.85°N 00.13°E	TL4719
Thorley	Isle of Wight	50.69°N 01.47°W	SZ3788
Thorley Houses	Hertfordshire	51.85°N 00.11°E	TL4620
Thorley Street	Hertfordshire	51.85°N 00.14°E	TL4819
Thorley Street	Isle of Wight	50.69°N 01.47°W	SZ3788
Thormanby	North Yorkshire	54.15°N 01.25°W	SE4974
Thorn	Devon	50.65°N 03.86°W	SX6886
Thorn	Powys	52.26°N 03.07°W	SO2763
Thornaby-on-Tees	Stockton-on-Tees	54.53°N 01.30°W	NZ4516
Thornage	Norfolk	52.88°N 01.04°E	TG0536
Thornborough	Buckinghamshire	51.99°N 00.92°W	SP7433
Thornborough	North Yorkshire	54.20°N 01.55°W	SE2979
Thornbury	Bradford	53.80°N 01.71°W	SE1934
Thornbury	Devon	50.84°N 04.27°W	SS4008
Thornbury	Herefordshire	52.22°N 02.55°W	SO6259
Thornbury	South Gloucestershire	51.60°N 02.52°W	ST6490
Thornby	Cumbria	54.85°N 03.10°W	NY2952
Thornby	Northamptonshire	52.36°N 01.03°W	SP6675
Thorncliffe	Kirklees	53.61°N 01.68°W	SE2113
Thorncliffe	Staffordshire	53.11°N 01.98°W	SK0158
Thorncombe	Dorset	50.82°N 02.89°W	ST3703
Thorncombe Street	Surrey	51.16°N 00.58°W	SU9942
Thorncote Green	Bedfordshire	52.10°N 00.32°W	TL1547
Thorncross	Isle of Wight	50.62°N 01.39°W	SZ4381
Thorndon	Suffolk	52.27°N 01.12°E	TM1369
Thorndon Cross	Devon	50.71°N 04.08°W	SX5393
Thorne	Cornwall	50.80°N 04.54°W	SS2104
Thorne	Doncaster	53.60°N 00.97°W	SE6813
Thorne Coffin	Somerset	50.95°N 02.68°W	ST5217
Thornehillhead	Devon	50.92°N 04.26°W	SS4116
Thorne Moor	Devon	50.67°N 04.29°W	SX3889
Thornend	Wiltshire	51.50°N 02.04°W	ST9778
Thorner	Leeds	53.85°N 01.43°W	SE3740
Thornes	Wakefield	53.66°N 01.51°W	SE3219
Thornes	Walsall	52.62°N 01.89°W	SK0703
Thorne St Margaret	Somerset	50.98°N 03.29°W	ST0921
Thorney	Buckinghamshire	51.50°N 00.50°W	TQ0479
Thorney	Cambridgeshire	52.61°N 00.11°W	TF2804
Thorney	Nottinghamshire	53.23°N 00.72°W	SK8572
Thorney	Somerset	50.99°N 02.82°W	ST4222
Thorney Close	Sunderland	54.87°N 01.44°W	NZ3654
Thorney Green	Suffolk	52.20°N 01.01°E	TM0660
Thorney Hill	Hampshire	50.79°N 01.71°W	SZ2099
Thorney Island	West Sussex	50.82°N 00.93°W	SU7503
Thorney Toll	Cambridgeshire	52.60°N 00.02°W	TF3403
Thorneywood	Nottinghamshire	52.96°N 01.12°W	SK5941
Thornfalcon	Somerset	51.00°N 03.02°W	ST2823
Thornford	Dorset	50.91°N 02.57°W	ST6013
Thorngrafton	Northumberland	54.97°N 02.34°W	NY7865
Thorngrove	Somerset	51.08°N 02.91°W	ST3632
Thorngumbald	East Riding of Yorkshire	53.71°N 00.18°W	TA2026
Thornham	Norfolk	52.95°N 00.57°E	TF7343
Thornham Fold	Rochdale	53.57°N 02.16°W	SD8909
Thornham Magna	Suffolk	52.28°N 01.07°E	TM1070
Thornham Parva	Suffolk	52.30°N 01.07°E	TM1072
Thornhaugh	Cambridgeshire	52.58°N 00.43°W	TF0600
Thornhill	Cardiff	51.53°N 03.19°W	ST1782
Thornhill	Caerphilly	51.54°N 03.22°W	ST1584
Thornhill	Cumbria	54.45°N 03.52°W	NY0108
Thornhill	Derbyshire	53.34°N 01.71°W	SK1983
Thornhill	Dumfries and Galloway	55.23°N 03.77°W	NX8795
Thornhill	Kirklees	53.65°N 01.62°W	SE2518
Thornhill	City of Southampton	50.90°N 01.34°W	SU4612
Thornhill	Stirling	56.16°N 04.15°W	NS6699
Thornhill	Torfaen	51.64°N 03.05°W	ST2795
Thornhill	Wiltshire	51.50°N 01.90°W	SU0778
Thorn Hill	Rotherham	53.43°N 01.36°W	SK4293
Thornhill Edge	Kirklees	53.64°N 01.63°W	SE2417
Thornhill Lees	Kirklees	53.66°N 01.63°W	SE2419
Thornhill Park	City of Southampton	50.91°N 01.33°W	SU4713
Thornhills	Calderdale	53.70°N 01.77°W	SE1523
Thornholme	East Riding of Yorkshire	54.05°N 00.30°W	TA1163
Thornicombe	Dorset	50.82°N 02.18°W	ST8703
Thornley (east of Durham)	Durham	54.74°N 01.44°W	NZ3639
Thornley (Weardale)	Durham	54.72°N 01.83°W	NZ1137
Thornliebank	East Renfrewshire	55.80°N 04.31°W	NS5559
Thornly Park	Renfrewshire	55.82°N 04.42°W	NS4862
Thornroan	Aberdeenshire	57.37°N 02.23°W	NJ8632
Thorns	North Yorkshire	54.39°N 02.18°W	NY8800
Thorns	Suffolk	52.16°N 00.54°E	TL7455
Thornseat	Sheffield	53.42°N 01.64°W	SK2492
Thornsett	Derbyshire	53.38°N 01.98°W	SK0187
Thorns Green	Cheshire	53.35°N 02.31°W	SJ7984
Thornthwaite	Cumbria	54.61°N 03.20°W	NY2225
Thornthwaite	North Yorkshire	54.01°N 01.74°W	SE1758
Thornton	Angus	56.60°N 02.99°W	NO3946
Thornton	Bradford	53.78°N 01.84°W	SE1032
Thornton	Buckinghamshire	52.00°N 00.90°W	SP7535
Thornton	East Riding of Yorkshire	53.89°N 00.86°W	SE7545
Thornton	Fife	56.16°N 03.16°W	NT2897
Thornton	Lancashire	53.87°N 03.00°W	SD3442
Thornton	Leicestershire	52.65°N 01.32°W	SK4607
Thornton	Lincolnshire	53.18°N 00.14°W	TF2467
Thornton	Northumberland	55.71°N 02.08°W	NT9547
Thornton	Pembrokeshire	51.72°N 05.04°W	SM9007
Thornton	Sefton	53.49°N 03.01°W	SD3300
Thornton	Stockton-on-Tees	54.51°N 01.27°W	NZ4713
Thornton Curtis	North Lincolnshire	53.63°N 00.36°W	TA0817
Thorntonhall	South Lanarkshire	55.76°N 04.24°W	NS5955
Thornton Heath	Croydon	51.39°N 00.11°W	TQ3168
Thornton Hough	Wirral	53.32°N 03.05°W	SJ3081
Thornton in Craven	North Yorkshire	53.92°N 02.15°W	SD9048
Thornton in Lonsdale	North Yorkshire	54.15°N 02.49°W	SD6873
Thornton-le-Beans	North Yorkshire	54.30°N 01.40°W	SE3990
Thornton-le-Clay	North Yorkshire	54.07°N 00.96°W	SE6865
Thornton-le-Dale	North Yorkshire	54.22°N 00.72°W	SE8382
Thornton-le-Moor	North Yorkshire	54.28°N 01.40°W	SE3988
Thornton le Moor	Lincolnshire	53.45°N 00.42°W	TF0596
Thornton-le-Moors	Cheshire	53.26°N 02.84°W	SJ4474
Thornton-le-Street	North Yorkshire	54.26°N 01.37°W	SE4186
Thorntonloch	East Lothian	55.95°N 02.40°W	NT7574
Thornton Rust	North Yorkshire	54.28°N 02.04°W	SD9788
Thornton Steward	North Yorkshire	54.27°N 01.74°W	SE1787
Thornton Watlass	North Yorkshire	54.26°N 01.64°W	SE2385
Thornwood Common	Essex	51.71°N 00.12°E	TL4704
Thornyhill	Aberdeenshire	56.83°N 02.60°W	NO6372
Thornylee	Scottish Borders	55.61°N 02.93°W	NT4136
Thoroton	Nottinghamshire	52.97°N 00.86°W	SK7642
Thorp	Oldham	53.56°N 02.13°W	SD9108
Thorp Arch	Leeds	53.89°N 01.34°W	SE4345
Thorpe	Cumbria	54.62°N 02.79°W	NY4926
Thorpe	Derbyshire	53.04°N 01.77°W	SK1550
Thorpe	East Riding of Yorkshire	53.90°N 00.49°W	SE9946
Thorpe (Thorpe by Trusthorpe)	Lincolnshire	53.31°N 00.23°E	TF4982
Thorpe (Thorpe-next-Haddiscoe)	Norfolk	52.52°N 01.58°E	TM4398
Thorpe	North Yorkshire	54.04°N 01.98°W	SE0161
Thorpe	Nottinghamshire	53.03°N 00.86°W	SK7649
Thorpe	Surrey	51.40°N 00.54°W	TQ0168
Thorpe Abbotts	Norfolk	52.36°N 01.21°E	TM1979
Thorpe Acre	Leicestershire	52.77°N 01.24°W	SK5120
Thorpe Arnold	Leicestershire	52.77°N 00.85°W	SK7720
Thorpe Astley	Leicestershire	52.62°N 01.20°W	SK5402
Thorpe Audlin	Wakefield	53.63°N 01.29°W	SE4716
Thorpe Bassett	North Yorkshire	54.14°N 00.68°W	SE8673
Thorpe Bay	Essex	51.53°N 00.75°E	TQ9185
Thorpe by Water	Rutland	52.55°N 00.68°W	SP8996
Thorpe Common	Suffolk	51.98°N 01.29°E	TM2637
Thorpe Constantine	Staffordshire	52.66°N 01.63°W	SK2508
Thorpe Culvert	Lincolnshire	53.11°N 00.19°E	TF4760
Thorpe Edge	Bradford	53.82°N 01.72°W	SE1837
Thorpe End	Norfolk	52.64°N 01.36°E	TG2811
Thorpe Fendykes	Lincolnshire	53.11°N 00.16°E	TF4560
Thorpe Green	Essex	51.86°N 01.15°E	TM1723
Thorpe Green	Lancashire	53.70°N 02.62°W	SD5923
Thorpe Green	Suffolk	52.15°N 00.81°E	TL9354
Thorpe Green	Surrey	51.40°N 00.54°W	TQ0168
Thorpe Hamlet	Norfolk	52.62°N 01.30°E	TG2408
Thorpe Hesley	Rotherham	53.45°N 01.44°W	SK3796
Thorpe in Balne	Doncaster	53.58°N 01.11°W	SE5910
Thorpe Langton	Leicestershire	52.52°N 00.91°W	SP7492
Thorpe Larches	Durham	54.62°N 01.41°W	NZ3826
Thorpe Latimer	Lincolnshire	52.93°N 00.31°W	TF1339
Thorpe Lea	Surrey	51.42°N 00.53°W	TQ0270
Thorpe-le-Soken	Essex	51.85°N 01.16°E	TM1822
Thorpe le Street	East Riding of Yorkshire	53.88°N 00.73°W	SE8344
Thorpe le Vale	Lincolnshire	53.39°N 00.19°W	TF2090
Thorpe Malsor	Northamptonshire	52.40°N 00.78°W	SP8379
Thorpe Mandeville	Northamptonshire	52.09°N 01.22°W	SP5344
Thorpe Market	Norfolk	52.86°N 01.32°E	TG2435
Thorpe Marriott	Norfolk	52.68°N 01.20°E	TG1714
Thorpe Morieux	Suffolk	52.14°N 00.83°E	TL9453
Thorpeness	Suffolk	52.17°N 01.61°E	TM4759
Thorpe on the Hill	Leeds	53.72°N 01.53°W	SE3126
Thorpe on the Hill	Lincolnshire	53.17°N 00.65°W	SK9065
Thorpe Row	Norfolk	52.63°N 00.89°E	TF9608
Thorpe Salvin	Rotherham	53.32°N 01.22°W	SK5281
Thorpe Satchville	Leicestershire	52.69°N 00.92°W	SK7311
Thorpe St Andrew	Norfolk	52.63°N 01.33°E	TG2609
Thorpe St Peter	Lincolnshire	53.11°N 00.21°E	TF4860
Thorpe Street	Suffolk	52.35°N 00.96°E	TM0277
Thorpe Thewles	Stockton-on-Tees	54.60°N 01.38°W	NZ4023
Thorpe Tilney	Lincolnshire	53.09°N 00.33°W	TF1257
Thorpe Underwood	North Yorkshire	54.02°N 01.29°W	SE4659
Thorpe Underwood	Northamptonshire	52.42°N 00.85°W	SP7881
Thorpe Waterville	Northamptonshire	52.41°N 00.50°W	TL0281
Thorpe Willoughby	North Yorkshire	53.77°N 01.13°W	SE5731
Thorpe Wood	North Yorkshire	53.78°N 01.12°W	SE5832
Thorpland	Norfolk	52.64°N 00.37°E	TF6108
Thorrington	Essex	51.83°N 01.03°E	TM0920
Thorverton	Devon	50.80°N 03.53°W	SS9202
Thoulstone	Wiltshire	51.23°N 02.24°W	ST8348

== Thr ==
Location	Locality	Coordinates (links to map & photo sources)	OS grid reference
Thrandeston	Suffolk	52.34°N 01.09°E	TM1176
Thrapston	Northamptonshire	52.39°N 00.54°W	SP9978
Thrashbush	North Lanarkshire	55.87°N 03.98°W	NS7666
Threapland	Cumbria	54.73°N 03.32°W	NY1539
Threapland	North Yorkshire	54.03°N 02.03°W	SD9860
Threapwood	Staffordshire	52.97°N 01.94°W	SK0442
Threapwood	Cheshire	52.99°N 02.83°W	SJ4445
Three Ashes	Hampshire	51.34°N 01.09°W	SU6361
Three Ashes	Herefordshire	51.90°N 02.71°W	SO5123
Three Ashes	Shropshire	52.39°N 02.92°W	SO3778
Three Ashes	Somerset	51.21°N 02.50°W	ST6546
Three Bridges	Lincolnshire	53.36°N 00.14°E	TF4388
Three Bridges	West Sussex	51.11°N 00.17°W	TQ2837
Three Burrows	Cornwall	50.27°N 05.17°W	SW7446
Three Chimneys	Kent	51.12°N 00.61°E	TQ8238
Three Cocked Hat	Norfolk	52.50°N 01.55°E	TM4196
Three Cocks	Powys	52.02°N 03.21°W	SO1737
Three Crofts	Dumfries and Galloway	55.03°N 03.76°W	NX8772
Three Crosses	Swansea	51.62°N 04.06°W	SS5794
Three Cups Corner	East Sussex	50.95°N 00.31°E	TQ6320
Three Fingers	Wrexham	52.96°N 02.82°W	SJ4541
Three Gates	Dorset	50.86°N 02.52°W	ST6307
Threehammer Common	Norfolk	52.71°N 01.46°E	TG3419
Three Hammers	Cornwall	50.65°N 04.51°W	SX2287
Three Holes	Norfolk	52.57°N 00.21°E	TF5000
Three Holes Cross	Cornwall	50.52°N 04.80°W	SX0173
Threekingham	Lincolnshire	52.91°N 00.39°W	TF0836
Three Leg Cross	East Sussex	51.05°N 00.39°E	TQ6831
Three Legged Cross	Dorset	50.84°N 01.88°W	SU0805
Threelows	Staffordshire	53.01°N 01.89°W	SK0746
Three Maypoles	Solihull	52.39°N 01.83°W	SP1177
Three Mile Cross	Berkshire	51.39°N 00.98°W	SU7167
Threemilestone	Cornwall	50.25°N 05.11°W	SW7844
Threemiletown	West Lothian	55.95°N 03.52°W	NT0575
Three Oaks	East Sussex	50.89°N 00.61°E	TQ8414
Threepwood	Scottish Borders	55.66°N 02.78°W	NT5142
Three Sisters	Denbighshire	53.13°N 03.36°W	SJ0961
Threewaters	Cornwall	50.46°N 04.77°W	SX0366
Threlkeld	Cumbria	54.61°N 03.07°W	NY3125
Threshers Bush	Essex	51.76°N 00.15°E	TL4909
Threshfield	North Yorkshire	54.06°N 02.03°W	SD9863
Thrigby	Norfolk	52.65°N 01.63°E	TG4612
Thringarth	Durham	54.60°N 02.10°W	NY9323
Thringstone	Leicestershire	52.74°N 01.37°W	SK4217
Thrintoft	North Yorkshire	54.33°N 01.50°W	SE3293
Thriplow	Cambridgeshire	52.09°N 00.08°E	TL4346
Throapham	Rotherham	53.37°N 01.20°W	SK5387
Throckenholt	Lincolnshire	52.66°N 00.01°W	TF3509
Throcking	Hertfordshire	51.95°N 00.06°W	TL3330
Throckley	Newcastle upon Tyne	54.98°N 01.76°W	NZ1566
Throckmorton	Worcestershire	52.13°N 02.03°W	SO9849
Throop	Dorset	50.73°N 02.25°W	SY8293
Throphill	Northumberland	55.15°N 01.79°W	NZ1385
Thropton	Northumberland	55.31°N 01.97°W	NU0202
Throsk	Stirling	56.09°N 03.85°W	NS8591
Througham	Gloucestershire	51.76°N 02.11°W	SO9207
Throwleigh	Devon	50.69°N 03.89°W	SX6690
Throwley	Kent	51.25°N 00.85°E	TQ9955
Throwley Forstal	Kent	51.25°N 00.83°E	TQ9854
Throxenby	North Yorkshire	54.28°N 00.44°W	TA0189
Thrumpton (Rushcliffe)	Nottinghamshire	53.31°N 00.95°W	SK7080
Thrumpton (Retford)	Nottinghamshire	52.87°N 01.25°W	SK5031
Thrumster	Highland	58.38°N 03.14°W	ND3345
Thrunton	Northumberland	55.38°N 01.87°W	NU0810
Thrupe	Somerset	51.20°N 02.57°W	ST6045
Thrupp	Cherwell, Oxfordshire	51.83°N 01.30°W	SP4815
Thrupp	Gloucestershire	51.72°N 02.20°W	SO8603
Thrupp	Vale of White Horse, Oxfordshire	51.68°N 01.58°W	SU2998
Thruscross	North Yorkshire	54.01°N 01.77°W	SE1558
Thrushelton	Devon	50.66°N 04.20°W	SX4487
Thrussington	Leicestershire	52.72°N 01.05°W	SK6415
Thruxton	Hampshire	51.20°N 01.58°W	SU2945
Thruxton	Herefordshire	52.00°N 02.83°W	SO4334
Thrybergh	Rotherham	53.45°N 01.30°W	SK4695

== Thu-Thw ==
Location	Locality	Coordinates (links to map & photo sources)	OS grid reference
Thulston	Derbyshire	52.87°N 01.40°W	SK4031
Thunder Bridge	Kirklees	53.59°N 01.72°W	SE1811
Thunder Hill	Norfolk	52.70°N 01.61°E	TG4418
Thunder's Hill	East Sussex	50.89°N 00.20°E	TQ5513
Thundersley	Essex	51.56°N 00.56°E	TQ7888
Thundridge	Hertfordshire	51.83°N 00.04°W	TL3517
Thurcaston	Leicestershire	52.68°N 01.17°W	SK5610
Thurcroft	Rotherham	53.38°N 01.26°W	SK4988
Thurdon	Cornwall	50.87°N 04.44°W	SS2811
Thurgarton	Norfolk	52.85°N 01.23°E	TG1834
Thurgarton	Nottinghamshire	53.03°N 00.97°W	SK6949
Thurgoland	Barnsley	53.50°N 01.57°W	SE2801
Thurlaston	Leicestershire	52.58°N 01.26°W	SP5099
Thurlaston	Warwickshire	52.33°N 01.32°W	SP4671
Thurlbear	Somerset	50.98°N 03.05°W	ST2621
Thurlby (North Kesteven)	Lincolnshire	53.13°N 00.65°W	SK9061
Thurlby (Bilsby, East Lindsey)	Lincolnshire	53.25°N 00.23°E	TF4975
Thurlby or Thurlby by Bourne (South Kesteven)	Lincolnshire	52.73°N 00.38°W	TF0916
Thurleigh	Bedfordshire	52.21°N 00.46°W	TL0558
Thurlestone	Devon	50.27°N 03.86°W	SX6743
Thurloxton	Somerset	51.06°N 03.04°W	ST2730
Thurlstone	Barnsley	53.52°N 01.65°W	SE2303
Thurlton	Norfolk	52.52°N 01.55°E	TM4198
Thurlton Links	Norfolk	52.51°N 01.55°E	TM4197
Thurlwood	Cheshire	53.11°N 02.30°W	SJ8057
Thurmaston	Leicestershire	52.67°N 01.09°W	SK6109
Thurnby	Leicestershire	52.63°N 01.05°W	SK6404
Thurne	Norfolk	52.67°N 01.54°E	TG4015
Thurnham	Kent	51.28°N 00.57°E	TQ8057
Thurning	Norfolk	52.81°N 01.08°E	TG0829
Thurning	Northamptonshire	52.43°N 00.41°W	TL0883
Thurnscoe	Barnsley	53.54°N 01.32°W	SE4505
Thurnscoe East	Barnsley	53.54°N 01.30°W	SE4605
Thursby	Cumbria	54.84°N 03.06°W	NY3250
Thursford	Norfolk	52.86°N 00.92°E	TF9734
Thursford Green	Norfolk	52.86°N 00.92°E	TF9734
Thursley	Surrey	51.14°N 00.71°W	SU9039
Thurso	Highland	58.59°N 03.53°W	ND1168
Thurso East	Highland	58.59°N 03.51°W	ND1268
Thurstaston	Wirral	53.34°N 03.14°W	SJ2484
Thurston	Suffolk	52.24°N 00.81°E	TL9265
Thurston Clough	Oldham	53.56°N 02.04°W	SD9707
Thurston End	Suffolk	52.12°N 00.61°E	TL7951
Thurstonfield	Cumbria	54.89°N 03.07°W	NY3156
Thurstonland	Kirklees	53.58°N 01.75°W	SE1610
Thurton	Norfolk	52.54°N 01.42°E	TG3200
Thurvaston (South Derbyshire)	Derbyshire	52.93°N 01.64°W	SK2437
Thurvaston (Derbyshire Dales)	Derbyshire	52.93°N 01.80°W	SK1338
Thuxton	Norfolk	52.62°N 00.99°E	TG0307
Thwaite	North Yorkshire	54.37°N 02.17°W	SD8998
Thwaite	Suffolk	52.26°N 01.09°E	TM1168
Thwaite Flat	Cumbria	54.15°N 03.21°W	SD2174
Thwaite Head	Cumbria	54.30°N 03.01°W	SD3490
Thwaites	Bradford	53.86°N 01.89°W	SE0741
Thwaites Brow	Bradford	53.85°N 01.89°W	SE0740
Thwaite St Mary	Norfolk	52.49°N 01.43°E	TM3394
Thwing	East Riding of Yorkshire	54.11°N 00.39°W	TA0570
