= Thornwood =

Thornwood is the name of several places:

In the United Kingdom

- Thornwood, Essex
- Thornwood, Glasgow, Scotland
- Thornwood Common, Essex

In the United States

- Thornwood, New York
- Thornwood, Washington
- Thornwood, South Elgin, a planned community in Illinois
