= Foster Street =

Hamlet in Essex, England

Coordinates: 51.761°N 0.156°E

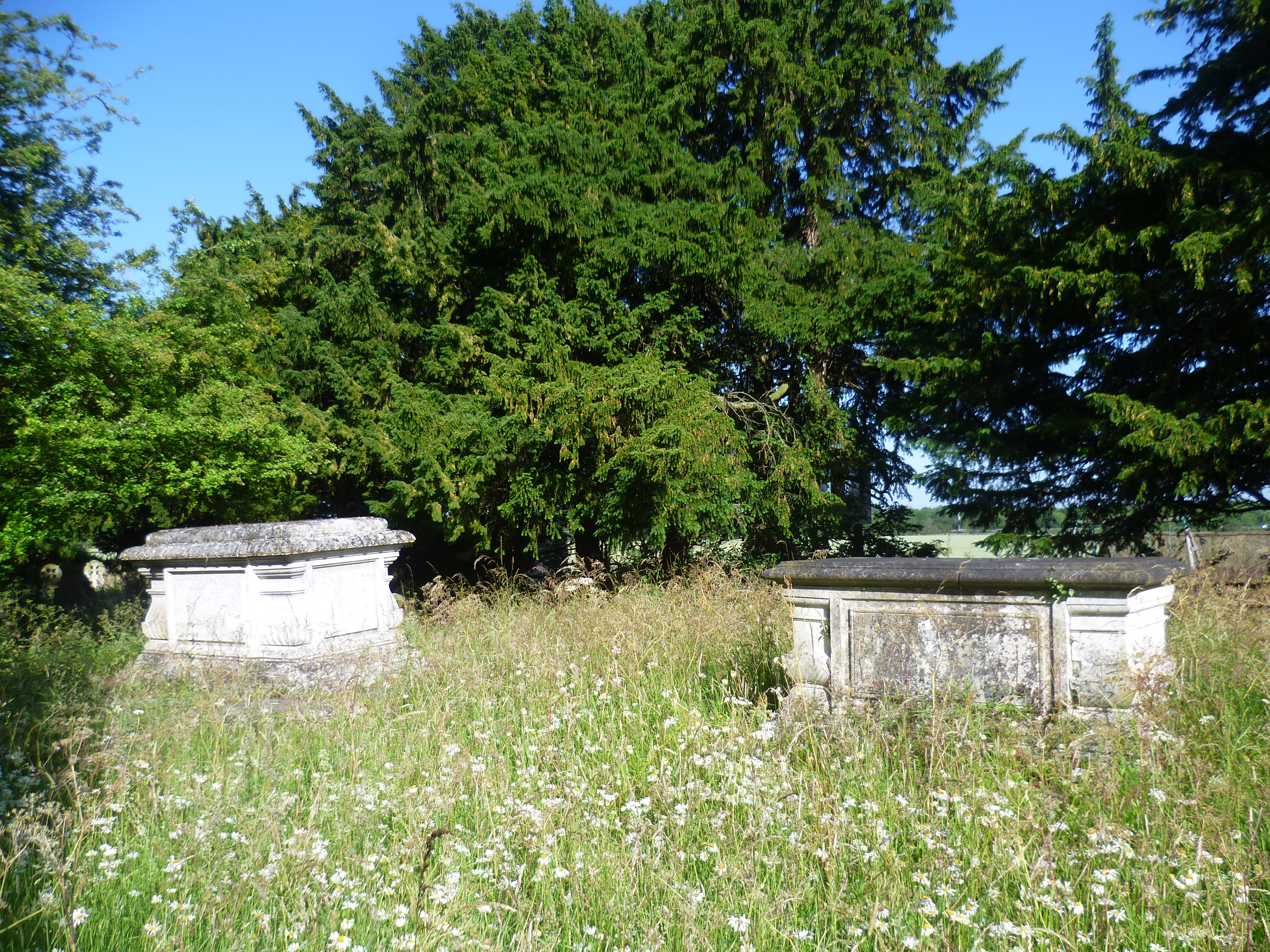
- Foster Street Non-conformist Burial Ground

- Location within Essex
- Civil parish: North Weald Bassett
- District: Epping Forest
- Shire county: Essex
- Region: East
- Country: England
- Sovereign state: United Kingdom
- Police: Essex
- Fire: Essex
- Ambulance: East of England

Foster Street is a hamlet in the civil parish of North Weald Bassett, in the Epping Forest district in the English county of Essex.

A non-conformist burying ground was established in 1677 by William Woodward, for the congregation that he was the leader of in the Harlow area. Among the burials are the radical editor Benjamin Flower, his wife Eliza, and their two daughters, the composer Eliza Flower and the poet Sarah Fuller Adams. The burial ground remained in use until 1979.

== Nearby settlements ==
Nearby settlements include the town of Harlow and the area of Church Langley and the hamlets of Hastingwood, Threshers Bush and Hobbs Cross.

== Transport ==
For transport there is the M11 motorway and the A414 road nearby.
