= Thornwood Common Flood Meadow =

Protected area in Essex, England

Coordinates: 51.7199°N 0.12812°E

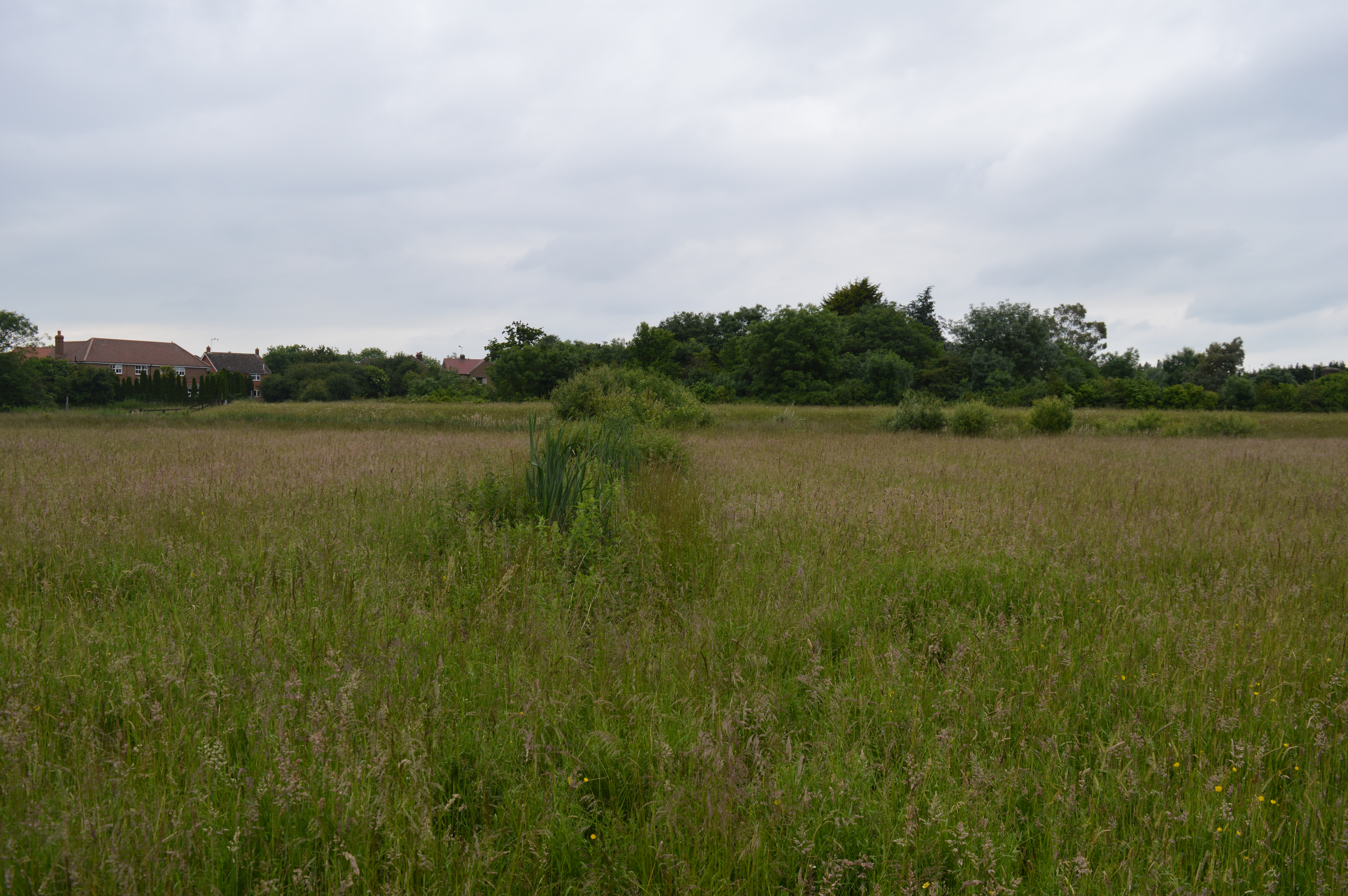
- Interactive map of Thornwood Common Flood Meadow
- Type: Local Nature Reserve
- Location: Thornwood Common, Essex
- OS grid: TL471045
- Area: 3 hectares (7.4 acres)
- Manager: Epping Forest District Council

Thornwood Common Flood Meadow is a 3-hectare (7.4-acre) Local Nature Reserve in Thornwood Common in Essex. It is owned and managed by Epping Forest District Council.

The flood meadow was created in 1998 by the council and the National Rivers Authority to alleviate flooding in Thornwood village, and it is managed for nature conservation. A wetland meadow, 800 trees and a 200-metre hedge have been created. Flowers include ragged robin, oxeye daisy and knapweed.

There is access by a footpath from Thornwood Common High Road, south of Woodside.
