= Threshers Bush =

Hamlet in Essex, England

Coordinates: 51.764°N 0.1705°E

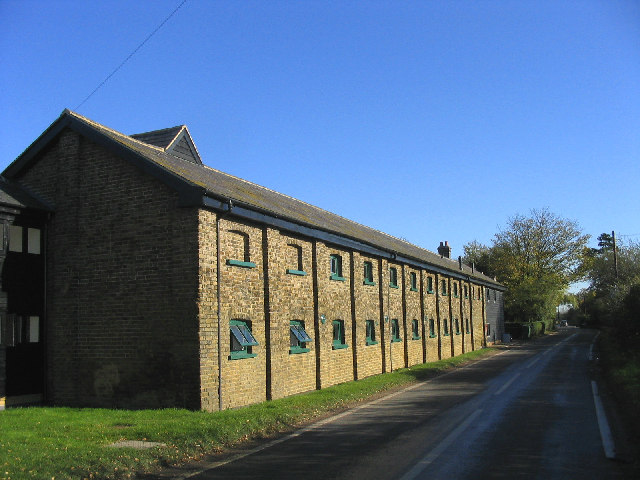
- Bush Hill Farm

- Location within Essex
- Civil parish: Matching; High Laver
- District: Epping Forest
- Shire county: Essex
- Region: East
- Country: England
- Sovereign state: United Kingdom
- Police: Essex
- Fire: Essex
- Ambulance: East of England

Threshers Bush or Thresher's Bush is a hamlet and road in the civil parishes of Matching and High Laver, and the Epping Forest district of Essex, England.

The M11 motorway is 1 mile (1.6 km) to the west, over which is the Harlow suburb of Church Langley. Junction 7 of the M11 is 2 miles (3.2 km) southwest, through which runs the A414 road to the county town of Chelmsford 15 miles (24 km) to the east. Settlements within 1 mile include the hamlets of Hastingwood (southwest), Foster Street (west) and Magdalen Laver (southeast).

Threshers Bush public house is The John Barleycorn at the east of the hamlet
