= North Weald Bassett =

Village in Essex, England

Coordinates: 51.71930°N 0.16284°E

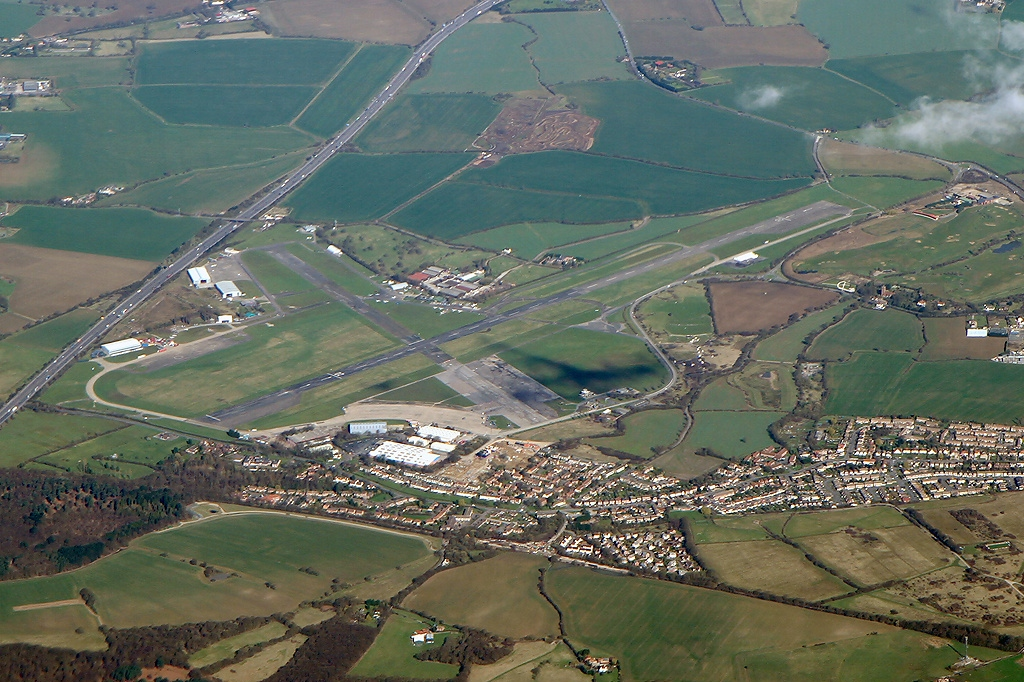
- A 2010 aerial view

- Location within Essex
- Interactive map of North Weald Bassett
- Area: 22.79 km^{2} (8.80 sq mi)
- Population: 6,448 (Parish, 2021); 4,348 (Built up area, 2021)
  - Density: 283/km^{2} (730/sq mi)
- OS grid reference: TL495045
- Civil parish: North Weald Bassett
- District: Epping Forest
- Shire county: Essex
- Region: East
- Country: England
- Sovereign state: United Kingdom
- Post town: EPPING
- Postcode district: CM16
- Dialling code: 01992
- Police: Essex
- Fire: Essex
- Ambulance: East of England
- UK Parliament: Brentwood and Ongar
- Website: www.northweald-pc.gov.uk

North Weald Bassett, or simply North Weald (/ˈwiːld/ WEELD), is a village and civil parish in the Epping Forest district of Essex, England. At the 2021 census the parish had a population of 6,448 and the built up area had a population of 4,348.

A market is held every Saturday and Bank Holiday Monday at North Weald Airfield. The market used to be the largest open air market in the country but reduced its size over the years.

== Geography ==
North Weald Bassett is approximately 20 miles (32 km) north-east from the centre of London. The parish abuts the outskirts of the towns of Harlow to the north and Epping to the south-west, and is split between these post towns for postal addresses. The parish includes the village of North Weald and the hamlets of Foster Street, Thornwood, Thornwood Common, Tyler's Green, and Hastingwood.

It is rural, with large sections of parish land at the south-west used by North Weald Golf Course, and North Weald Airfield and (ICAO: EGSX), an operational general aviation aerodrome which was an important fighter station during the Battle of Britain, when it was known as the RAF Station RAF North Weald.

Latton Priory was a small priory of Augustinian Canons Regular, the remains of which are a Grade II* listed building. Paris Hall is a 16th-century Grade II* listed house.

== History ==
In 1086 North Weald was one of the most thickly wooded places in Essex. Peter de Valognes' manor in North Weald was said to contain woodland sufficient for 1,500 swine, showing how wooded the area was.

The 'wood of Henry of Essex' in North Weald was mentioned in 1248. In 1260 Philip Basset, Henry's successor as lord of the manor, complained that many robberies were being done in this wood near the road between Ongar and Waltham, and he secured the king's permission to assart (turn forestry into arable land) 6 acres of the wood.

Norden's Map of Essex, 1594, does not show North Weald as a densely wooded parish. In 1777 there was apparently no woodland there apart from Weald Hall Coppice. This is specially interesting in view of the survival of large woods in neighbouring parishes. Weald Hall Coppice still survives, and there is also a small wood at Canes farm. North Weald formed 1,739 acres of the Ongar Hundred.

The ancient manor houses were Weald Hall, near the centre of the parish, Canes, Marshalls and Paris Hall at Hastingwood. In addition to the four manor houses there were probably substantial medieval dwellings at Tylers Green, Bowlers Green, Bridge Farm (near Weald Bridge), and possibly one or two other places. The parish church, St Andrew's, which dates from the 14th century, is ½ mile east of Weald Hall.

Apart from the church the oldest existing building in the parish is probably Tylers. This is a timber-framed and plastered house consisting of a central block with a gabled cross-wing at each end. It may date from the 16th century but there is some evidence that the central block was an earlier open hall with a screens passage at its south-west end. The 'King's Head' at Weald Gullet is a timber-framed building probably of the same period. It was restored about 1927. Two ancient timber-framed cottages which formerly stood on the north side of the main road near the end of Church Lane were destroyed in a German air raid in 1941.

Until the 17th century the Epping-Chelmsford road was probably the most important in the parish. In 1786 a petition was presented to the Epping Highway Trust by the people of North Weald asking that the road should be taken over by the trust. An Act of Parliament for this purpose was passed in the following year. A toll-gate was erected at the junction of the main road and Woodside. The gate-keeper lived at first in a rented cottage but a toll-house was built about 1818. This still survives: a single-story building of brick, now plastered, with a tiled roof.

In 1801 North Weald, with 620 inhabitants, was one of the more densely populated parishes of the area. In the 19th century the population followed the trend normal in rural Essex until about 1861: there was an increase to 886 in 1831 and a subsequent slight decrease. But between 1861 and 1901, when the agricultural depression was depopulating most villages, the population of North Weald rose from 842 to 1,135. This was clearly due to the coming of the railway in 1865. New places of worship in the 19th century were the Congregational chapel in Weald Bridge Road, built about 1830 but closed about 1874, the Chapel of Ease at Hastingwood (1864), the Iron Mission Church at Thornwood (1888), and the Wesleyan churches at Thornwood (1883) and Weald Gullet (1888). The original school was relinquished in favour of a larger building and the new school was extended in about 1842 and again in 1871.

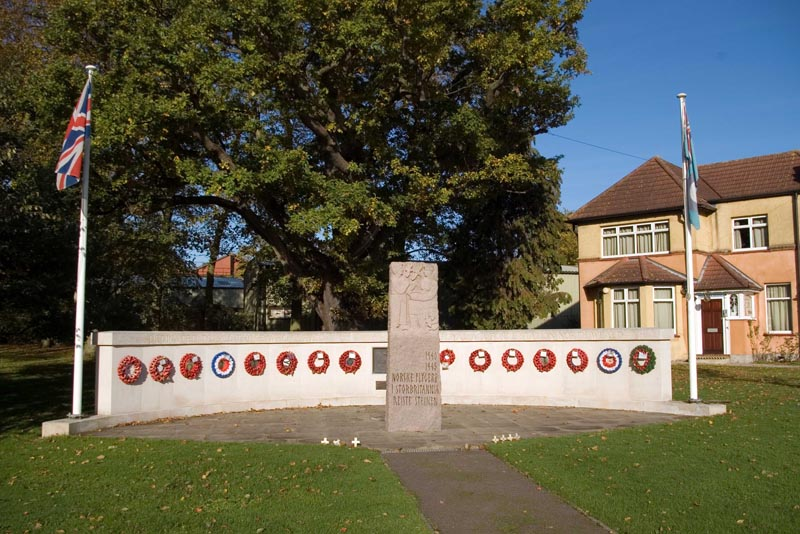
The airfield memorial for those who died in the two world wars and for those who worked for the airfield.

In 1865 coach travel in this area was superseded by the opening of the railway through Epping to Ongar, with a station at North Weald. This brought London within easy reach. This line was electrified in 1957 but closed to regular passenger traffic in 1994. Beyond Ongar public transport was poor until the introduction of motor buses. There are now infrequent bus services to Epping, Ongar, Brentwood.

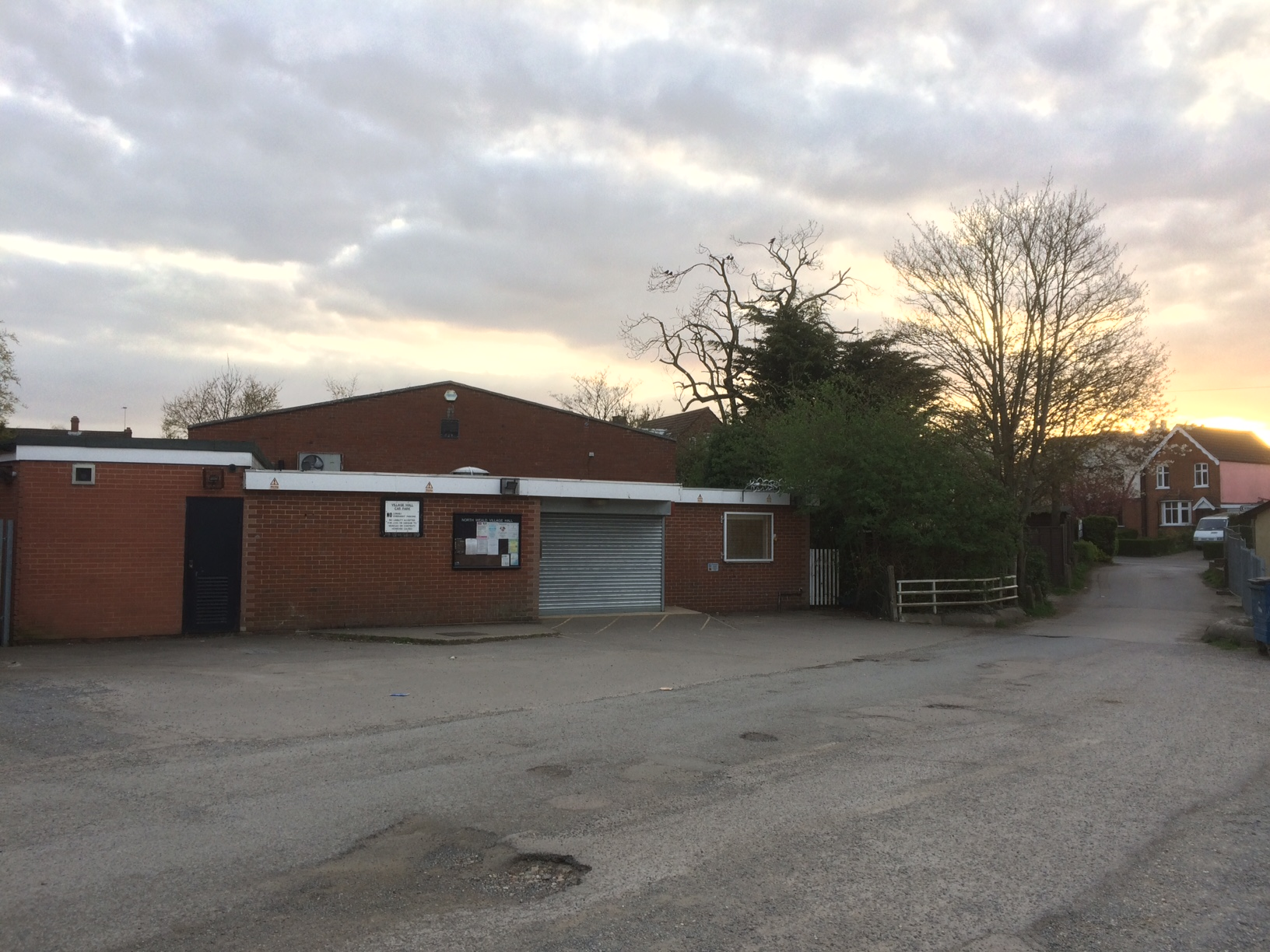
The hall, rebuilt in 1967. The stage area remains from the original hall, built in 1928. It stands on ground donated by the Marconi company.

North Weald was late in getting its own post-office, probably because it was served directly from Epping. In 1883 a day mail was established at North Weald. A telegraph office was set up in 1886. The telephone service was introduced in 1920.

The population rose very little during the first 20 years of the 20th century, and was only 1,239 in 1921 with the Post Office Radio Station established at Weald Gullet in 1921. There was an increase to 1,642 in 1931 and then a burst of building lasting until the Second World War. A few council houses were built before 1939. In the 1940s, the North Weald Bassett Parish was formed and North Weald was removed from the Ongar Hundred and placed, along with Thornwood, Hastingwood and various other small villages in the parish.

Since 1945 three large housing estates have been built. In 1953 the estimated population of North Weald was 3,200-an increase of almost 100 per cent. on 1931. The iron mission church at Thornwood was replaced in 1923 by a brick church and in 1931 the Wesleyan church at Weald Gullet was rebuilt. In 1939, however, the Wesleyan church at Thornwood was closed owing to lack of support. A village hall was built in 1928, on the south side of the village. In 1967, the village hall was rebuilt.

== Governance and demography ==
The parish was part of Ongar Rural District from 1894 to 1955 and Epping and Ongar Rural District from 1955 to 1974. The parish is run by a parish council, with its offices in the village of North Weald.

As at the 2001 census the population was 6,039 and 51.5% female, with an average age of 39. There are 2,387 households, with an average household size of 2.45.

=== Parish Council ===
The village Parish Council is based in Thornwood (as of 2024) and is responsible for maintaining allotments, local cemeteries, and public spaces (including parks, the Debt of Honour memorial, and benches), and providing first-stage planning scrutiny of developments and applications.

Since 2017, Cllr Alan Buckley has chaired the Parish Council, and the deputy chair is Shirley Hawkins.

The council is not elected, but rather residents apply to join and then are appointed to the body once a vacancy is published.

As of July 2024, the council has 14 members, with one vacancy. It is controlled by Independents. The Council formerly had several Conservatives elected to serve on it, however most left, leaving just one Conservative.

Party	Councillor
Hastingwood
Conservative	Andrew P Irvine
Independent	Paula A Etherington
Independent	Peter Lambert
North Weald (Village)
Independent	Terry F Blanks
Independent	Alan J Buckley
Labour	Kevin Hind
Independent	Andy C Tyler
Independent	Sheila M Jackson MBE
Independent	Mark J Stroud
Independent	Dawn E Wood
Independent	Nick Born
Independent	Colin B T Kinnear
Thornwood Common
Independent	Shirley Hawkins
Independent	Baden Clegg
Independent	Richard Spearman

Below is a list of Parish Council chairmen for North Weald Bassett since 1934. The longest consecutive serving chairman was Cyril Hawkins who served for 11 years until his death in 2017. However, Harry Waterman served 12 non-consecutive years as chairman.

Chairman	Start	End	Chairman	Start	End
J.M Holt	1934	1936	R. Law	1983	1984
Frank Emberson	1936	1938	D.W Cousins	1984	1985
E.C Gilford	1938	1941	A.A Winn	1985	1986
E.V Boram	1941	1946	M. Slater	1986	1987
Leonard Davis	1946	1953	A.A Winn	1987	1989
Harry Waterman	1953	1961	D.W Cousins	1989	1995
R.H Payze	1961	1962	Ann Grigg	1995	1998
P.M Pegrum	1962	1969	Robert Wood	1998	2000
Harry Waterman	1969	1973	Peter Collins	2000	2001
R.L Davis	1973	1980	Robert Wood	2001	2006
E.B Hudspeth	1980		Cyril Hawkins	2006	2017
N.J Wicks	1980	1982	Alan Buckley	2017	Incumbent
M. Slater	1982	1983	Alan Buckley	2017	Incumbent

=== District Council ===
North Weald has voted for Conservatives at every district council election since 1968 except twice - 1973 and 2024. Until 1979, the parish was split into two district council seats - North Weald, and Thornwood and Hastingwood. Each had just one representative.

In 1979, this changed, and the entire parish and its villages were incorporated into a single two-member seat. In 2002, the boundaries were changed splitting the Parish up again into three seats. North Weald village would remain as a two-member seat and cover the entire village and Tyler's Green. Thornwood was incorporated into a new two-member Epping Lindsey and Thornwood Common seats, whilst Hastingwood, Foster Street, and Harlow Common were adopted into a new Hastingwood, Matching & Sheering Village single-member seat.

In 2024, boundary changes saw the seat reformed under the original parish boundaries with Hastingwood, Thornwood, and North Weald (and the other smaller villages) brought under a single seat, but with three members. The 2024 district council election was notable in that it produced the first Independent councillor for the village since Harry Waterman in 1973 who won the most votes by a considerable margin. This election also saw the Conservatives' worst performance since the 1960s. As a result, of the three candidates elected, the one who secured the fewest votes will face re-election in two years time, followed by the next lowest candidate in three years time, whilst the highest scoring candidate would have a full four-year term.

The seat is currently represented (in order of votes secured at the last election) by Cllr Tom Bromwich (Independent), Cllr Nigel Bedford (Conservative), and Cllr Leslie Burrows (Conservative).

==== Elections results from 1973 to 1979 ====
Year	Candidate	Independent			Candidate	Conservative			Candidate	Labour			Candidate	Liberal / Lib Dem		
Year	Candidate	Votes	%	±%	Candidate	Votes	%	±%	Candidate	Votes	%	±%	Candidate	Votes	%	±%
1973	Hastingwood and Thornwood															
1973	No candidate				B. Greenhill	265	66.9	N/A	V. Bardell	131	33.1	N/A	No candidate			
1973	North Weald															
1973	H. Waterman	692	72.0	N/A	R. Bednall	269	28.0	N/A	No candidate				No candidate			
1976	Hastingwood and Thornwood															
1976	No candidate				B. Greenhill	381	68.5	▲1.6	J. Bednall	175	31.5	▼1.6	No candidate			
1976	North Weald															
1976	No candidate				C. Kent	678	60.2	▲32.2	J. Edwards	296	26.2	N/A	C. Rush	153	13.6	N/A

==== Elections results from 1976 to 2002 ====
Year	Candidate	Conservative			Candidate	Labour			Candidate	Liberal / Lib Dem			Candidate	Independent		
Year	Candidate	Votes	%	±%	Candidate	Votes	%	±%	Candidate	Votes	%	±%	Candidate	Votes	%	±%
1979	I. Abbey	1,763	64.8	N/A	B. King	955	35.2	N/A	No candidate							
1979	B. Greenhill	1,625	64.8	N/A	A. Vickery	839	35.2	N/A	No candidate							
1982	B. Greenhill	1,001	60.2	▼4.6	P. Vickery	482	29.0	▼6.2	No candidate				R. Wyness	179	10.8	N/A
1983	I. Abbey	988	58.2	▼2.0	D. Grenville-Brown	328	19.3	▼9.7	No candidate				R. Wyness	382	22.5	▲11.7
1986	E. Hudspeth	Uncontested														
1987	I. Abbey	1,263	67.9	N/A	D. Tetlow	255	13.7	N/A	J. Whitehouse	343	18.4	N/A	No candidate			
1990	E. Hudspeth	1,037	52.3	▼15.6	I. Standfast	661	33.4	▲19.7	S. Ward	284	14.3	▼4.1	No candidate			
1991	D. Cousins	901	55.8	▲3.5	I. Standfast	417	25.8	▼7.6	S. Ward	297	18.4	▲4.1	No candidate			
1994	E. Hudspeth	949	58.5	▲2.7	I. Standfast	674	41.5	▲15.7	No candidate				No candidate			
1995	I. Abbey	600	38.2	▼20.3	D. Tetlow	520	33.1	▼8.4	No candidate				R. Wyness	249	15.8	N/A
1995	I. Abbey	600	38.2	▼20.3	D. Tetlow	520	33.1	▼8.4	No candidate				M. May	203	12.9	N/A
1998	A. Grigg	780	64.4	▲26.2	J. Childs	431	35.6	▲2.5	No candidate				No candidate			
1999	D. Stallan	816	70.0	▲5.6	D. Clark	256	22.0	▼13.6	M. Richardson	93	8.0	N/A	No candidate			

==== Elections results from 2002 to 2024 ====
Year	Candidate	Conservative			Candidate	Labour			Candidate	Liberal / Lib Dem			Candidate	Independent			Candidate	Other	
Year	Candidate	Votes	%	±%	Candidate	Votes	%	±%	Candidate	Votes	%	±%	Candidate	Votes	%	±%	Candidate	Votes	%
2002	Epping Lindsey and Thornwood																		
2002	M. Colling	868	39.2	N/A	P. Johns	304	13.7	N/A	O. Dunseath	773	34.9	N/A	C. Hudson	269	12.1	N/A	No candidate		
2002	C. Whitbread	858	39.2	N/A	R. Jones	255	13.7	N/A	J. Hedges	773	34.9	N/A	C. Hudson	269	12.1	N/A	No candidate		
2002	A. Green	835	39.2	N/A					J. Rumble	739	34.9	N/A	C. Hudson	269	12.1	N/A	No candidate		
2002	Hastingwood, Matching and Sheering Village																		
2002	T. Dewhurst	240	40.6	N/A	No candidate				No candidate				R. Morgan	351	59.4	N/A	No candidate		
2002	North Weald Bassett																		
2002	D. Stallan	902	80.0	N/A	No candidate				R. Gill	226	20.0	N/A	No candidate				No candidate		
2002	A. Grigg	856	80.0	N/A	No candidate				No candidate				No candidate				No candidate		
2003	Epping Lindsey and Thornwood																		
2003	A. Green	731	47.7		L. Appaih	111	7.3		J. Hedges	575	37.5		No candidate				T. Norris	115	7.5
2003	Hastingwood, Matching and Sheering Village																		
2003	M. Wright	193	32.5		No candidate				No candidate				R. Morgan	400	67.5		No candidate		
2003	North Weald Bassett																		
2003	A. Grigg	677	80.0		No candidate				J. Rumble	98	11.6		No candidate				B. Johns	71	8.4
2004	Epping Lindsey and Thornwood																		
2004	C. Whitbread	1,136	61.7		No candidate				I. Black	455	24.7		No candidate				R. Jones	249	13.5
2006	Epping Lindsey and Thornwood																		
2006	M. Colling	1,060	58.6		A. Baldwin	198	10.9		J. Hedges	552	30.5		No candidate				No candidate		
2006	North Weald Bassett																		
2006	D. Stallan	1,032	82.4		No candidate				J. Rumble	221	17.6		No candidate				No candidate		
2007	Epping Lindsey and Thornwood																		
2007	A. Green	930	48.9		No candidate				I. Black	497	26.1		No candidate				A. Wheeler	295	15.5
2007	A. Green	930	48.9		No candidate				I. Black	497	26.1		No candidate				T. Frankland	181	9.5
2007	Hastingwood, Matching and Sheering Village																		
2007	Uncontested												R. Morgan	Uncontested					
2007	North Weald Bassett																		
2007	A. Grigg	887	82.1		No candidate				J. Rumble	193	17.9		No candidate				No candidate		
2008	Epping Lindsey and Thornwood																		
2008	C. Whitbread	905	50.9		S. Bullough	120	6.8		L. Collier	531	30.0		No candidate				T. Bentley	132	7.4
2008	C. Whitbread	905	50.9		S. Bullough	120	6.8		L. Collier	531	30.0		No candidate				R. Jones	87	4.9
2010	Epping Lindsey and Thornwood																		
2010	W. Breare-Hall	1,692	49.3		S. Bullough	341	9.8		L. Collier	1,264	37.0		No candidate				B. Johns	133	3.9
2010	North Weald Bassett																		
2010	D. Stallan	1,682	71.5		No candidate				G. Howard	511	21.7		No candidate				N. Harries	159	6.8
2011	Epping Lindsey and Thornwood																		
2011	S. Packford	1,047	49.1		S. Harding	430	20.2		L. Hughes	366	17.2		No candidate				M. McGough	190	8.9
2011	S. Packford	1,047	49.1		S. Harding	430	20.2		L. Hughes	366	17.2		No candidate				J. Hart	99	4.6
2011	Hastingwood, Matching and Sheering Village																		
2011	No candidate				No candidate				No candidate				R. Morgan	654	87.4		S. Pepper	94	12.6
2011	North Weald Bassett																		
2011	A. Grigg	1,064	76.6		No candidate				I. Black	112	8.1		No candidate				N. Barnecutt	213	15.3
2012	Epping Lindsey and Thornwood																		
2012	T. Church	957	54.3		S. Harding	486	27.5		L. Hughes	153	8.6		No candidate				B. Johns	166	9.4
2012	C. Whitbread	907	54.3		S. Lister	417	27.5		S. Hughes	112	8.6		No candidate				B. Johns	166	9.4
2012	Hastingwood, Matching and Sheering Village																		
2012	No candidate				L. Morter	82	13.2		No candidate				R. Morgan	538	86.7		No candidate		
2014	Epping Lindsey and Thornwood																		
2014	W. Breare-Hall	719	37.6		S. Bullough	232	12.1		I. Black	267	14.0		No candidate				B. Robertson	566	29.6
2014	W. Breare-Hall	719	37.6		S. Bullough	232	12.1		I. Black	267	14.0		No candidate				W. Hartington	130	6.8
2014	North Weald Bassett																		
2014	D. Stallan	744	58.8		No candidate				A. Verrall	83	6.6		No candidate				P. Stevens	438	34.6
2015	Epping Lindsey and Thornwood																		
2015	C. Whitbread	2,182	61.7		S. Bullough	524	14.8		I. Black	558	15.7		No candidate				W. Hartington	272	7.7
2015	Hastingwood, Matching and Sheering Village																		
2015	J. Share-Bernia	597	42.5		S. Jenner	160	11.3		No candidate				R. Morgan	648	46.1		No candidate		
2015	North Weald Bassett																		
2015	A. Grigg	1,452	59.8		No candidate				A. Verrall	180	7.4		No candidate				P. Stevens	620	25.5
2015	A. Grigg	1,452	59.8		No candidate				A. Verrall	180	7.4		No candidate				N. Barnecutt	176	7.2
2016	Epping Lindsey and Thornwood																		
2016	C. Whitbread	927	54.9		S. Bullough	252	14.9		C. McCredie	388	23.0		No candidate				R. Martin	121	7.2
2018	Epping Lindsey and Thornwood																		
2018	L. Burrows	844	43.7		S. Bullough	183	9.4		C. McCredie	811	42.0		No candidate				P. Scales	92	4.7
2018	North Weald Bassett																		
2018	P. Bolton	852	79.5		No candidate				A. Verrall	219	20.4		No candidate				No candidate		
2019	Epping Lindsey and Thornwood																		
2019	C. Whitbread	862	46.0		S. Bullough	116	6.2		I. Black	783	41.8		B. Johns	109	5.8		No candidate		
2019	Hastingwood, Matching and Sheering Village																		
2019	R. Morgan	Uncontested																	
2019	North Weald Bassett																		
2019	J. McIvor	470	53.5		No candidate				G. Simmons	183	20.8		A. Tyler	225	25.6		No candidate		
2021	Epping Lindsey and Thornwood																		
2021	H. Whitbread	1,316	58.6		S. Bullough	231	10.2		N. Read	698	31.0		No candidate				No candidate		
2022	Epping Lindsey and Thornwood																		
2022	L. Burrows	929	47.2		S. Bullough	190	9.6		R. Griffiths	850	43.2		No candidate				No candidate		
2022	North Weald Bassett																		
2022	P. Bolton	635	63.4		A. Wingfield	173	17.3		E. Barnard	194	19.4		No candidate				No candidate		
2023	Epping Lindsey and Thornwood																		
2023	S. Jones	750	39.0		S. Bullough	120	6.2		R. Sharif	1,052	54.7		No candidate				No candidate		
2023	Hastingwood, Matching and Sheering Village																		
2023	R. Morgan	379	67.2		M. Gwynne	123	21.8		P. Ward	62	11.0		No candidate				No candidate		
2023	North Weald Bassett																		
2023	J. McIvor	507	57.9		K. Hind	221	25.2		E. Barnard	148	16.9		No candidate				No candidate		

==== Elections results since 2024 ====
Year	Candidate	Independent			Candidate	Reform UK			Candidate	Conservative			Candidate	Labour			Candidate	Liberal Democrat		
Year	Candidate	Votes	%	±%	Candidate	Votes	%	±%	Candidate	Votes	%	±%	Candidate	Votes	%	±%	Candidate			
2024	North Weald Bassett																			
2024	T. Bromwich	889	47.1	N/A	No candidate				N. Bedford	604	32.0	N/A	K. Hind	392	20.7	N/A	No candidate			
2024	T. Bromwich	889	47.1	N/A	No candidate				L. Burrows	540	32.0	N/A	P. Stockton	382	20.7	N/A	No candidate			
2024	T. Bromwich	889	47.1	N/A	No candidate				L. Mills	472	32.0	N/A	No candidate				No candidate			
2026	No candidate				J. Gupta	1,209	49.4	N/A	A. Irvine	731	30.0	▼2.0	A. Huish	189	7.7	▼13.1	T. Addenbrooke	316	13.0	N/A

=== County Council ===
North Weald, Tyler's Green, Hastingwood, and Foster Street all fall within the North Weald and Nazeing county council division, whilst Thornwood falls under the Epping and Theydon Bois division. Also represented in this seat are the communities of Epping Green, Epping Upland, Lower Nazeing, Bumble's Green and Roydon. The seat has been consistently Conservative. In 2025, the division boundaries will change and Thornwood will be incorporated under the North Weald and Nazeing division.

Year	Candidate	Conservative			Candidate	Labour			Candidate	Liberal / Lib Dem			Candidate	Other		
Year	Candidate	Votes	%	±%	Candidate	Votes	%	±%	Candidate	Votes	%	±%	Candidate	Votes	%	±%
1981	G. Padfield	2,793	61.8	N/A	D. Grenville-Brown	1,144	25.3	N/A	T. Owen	582	12.9	N/A	No candidate			
1985	I. Abbey	2,243	57.8	▼4.0	I. Bell	647	16.7	▼8.6	J. Carter	826	21.3	▲8.4	R. Wyness	167	4.3	N/A
1989	I. Abbey	2,612	70.7	▲12.9	D. Mills	660	17.9	▲1.2	S. Ward	423	11.4	▼9.9	No candidate			
1993	I. Abbey	1,915	60.5	▼10.2	E. Young	637	20.1	▲2.2	I. Myers	615	19.4	▲8.0	No candidate			
1997	I. Abbey	4,645	56.6	▼3.9	G. Smith	2,292	27.9	▲6.8	C. Bagnall	1,265	15.4	▼4.0	No candidate			
2001	A. Jackson	4,111	59.3	▲2.7	B. Johns	1,856	26.8	▼1.1	M. Richardson	970	14.0	▼1.4	No candidate			
2005	A. Jackson	5,301	58.3	▼1.0	K. Morris	1,654	18.2	▼8.0	J. Hedges	1,623	17.9	▲3.9	P. Goldsmith	511	5.6	N/A
2009	A. Jackson	3,119	61.0	▲1.7	K. Morris	419	8.2	▼10.0	M. Lake	524	10.2	▼7.7	J. Leppert	612	12.0	N/A
2009	A. Jackson	3,119	61.0	▲1.7	K. Morris	419	8.2	▼10.0	M. Lake	524	10.2	▼7.7	N. Harries	422	8.6	▲3.0
2013	A. Jackson	1,669	47.6	▼13.4	D. Mills	421	12.0	▲3.8	A. Verrall	83	2.4	▼7.8	P. Field	1,170	33.4	N/A
2013	A. Jackson	1,669	47.6	▼13.4	D. Mills	421	12.0	▲3.8	A. Verrall	83	2.4	▼7.8	N. Barnecutt	164	4.7	▼3.9
2017	A. Jackson	3,081	78.5	▲30.9	S. Mullard	500	12.7	▲0.7	A. Verrall	346	8.8	▲6.4	No candidate			
2021	C. Whitbread	2,884	72.6	▼5.9	L. Kerrigan	656	16.5	▲3.8	E. Thatcher	435	10.9	▲2.2	No candidate			
2025	C. Whitbread	1,716	31.9	▼40.7	A. Drummond	461	8.6	▼7.9	T. Addenbrooke	524	9.7	▼1.2	K. McIvor	2,684	49.8	N/A

=== UK Parliament ===
From 1974, the North Weald Bassett parish fell within the Harlow constituency, before boundary changes in 1997 saw North Weald and North Weald were brought under Epping Forest, whilst Hastingwood remained part of Harlow. In 2010, North Weald was adopted into Brentwood and Ongar, whilst Thornwood remained in Epping Forest. Below are the list of MPs for the majority parts of the parish.

Election	Constituency	Member	Party
Feb 1974	Harlow	Stan Newens	Labour
1983	Harlow	Jerry Hayes	Conservative
1997	Epping Forest	Eleanor Laing	Conservative
2010	Brentwood and Ongar	Sir Eric Pickles	Conservative
2017	Brentwood and Ongar	Alex Burghart	Conservative

Since 2010, North Weald has been part of one of the most Conservative supporting seats in the UK. Consistently gaining over 60.0% of the vote, the 2024 general election saw the Conservatives fall to its worst-ever vote share in the constituency winning 36.7% of the vote to Reform UK's 24.3% and Labour's 23.0%.

According to ward estimate breakdowns, North Weald voted in the following way at the 2024 general election:

General election 2024: North Weald (Brentwood and Ongar)
Party	Candidate	Votes	%	±%
Conservative	Alex Burghart	907	37.1	N/A
Labour	Gareth Barrett	652	26.7	N/A
Reform	Paul Godfrey	577	23.6	N/A
Liberal Democrats	David Kendall	214	8.8	N/A
Green	Reece Learmouth	84	3.4	N/A
English Democrat	Robin Tilbrook	10	0.4	N/A
Majority		255	10.4	N/A
Turnout		2,444	N/A	N/A
Registered electors		N/A		
Conservative hold				

== Geography ==
The village is in the southwest highest part of the North Weald Bassett parish which rises to 300 ft.

North Weald is 2 miles (3 km) northeast of Epping, 3.5 miles (6 km) west of Chipping Ongar and 4 miles (6 km) southeast of Harlow. The county town of Chelmsford is approximately 14 miles (23 km) to the east.

There are significant patches of sensitive historic landscape at the north-eastern and western edges of the village, which encompass patches of surviving pre-18th-century and 18th- 19th-century fields and a large area of ancient landscape to the south of the village. Also to the west and east of North Weald Airfield, sensitive areas of historic landscape comprise surviving pre 18th century and 18th- 19th-century fields. Much was previously used for arable farming.

Five areas with urban green-space character provide accessible areas for sport and recreation.

== Demography ==
Historical population
Year	Pop.	±%
1801	620	—
1811	656	+5.8%
1821	827	+26.1%
1831	887	+7.3%
1841	886	−0.1%
1861	842	−5.0%
1881	1,002	+19.0%
1891	1,117	+11.5%
1901	1,135	+1.6%
1911	1,146	+1.0%
1921	1,239	+8.1%
1931	1,642	+32.5%
1951	3,127	+90.4%
1961	3,957	+26.5%
2001	4,461	+12.7%
2007	4,491	+0.7%
2015 estimate	4,477	−0.3%

As of 2001 census the population was 4,461 and 51.5% female, with an average age of 39.

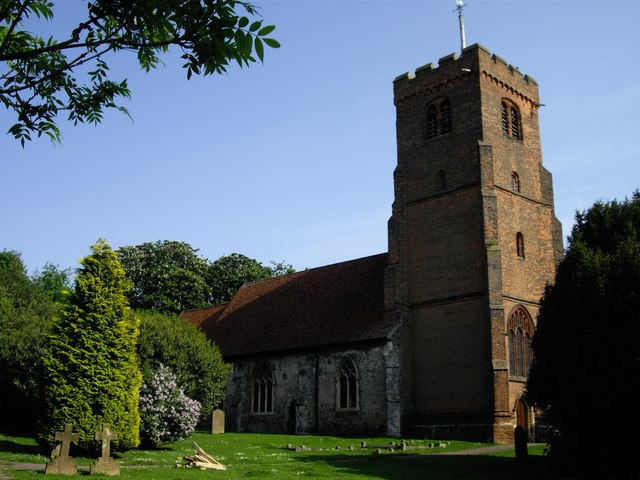
St. Andrew's Church, built in 1330AD on top of an original structure.

As of 2011 there are 1,867 households with an average household size of 2.45. Population density (people per hectare) stands at 6.80.

In 2011, 98% of citizens were white-British, 1% were mixed and 1% Asian. The majority of citizens identify as Christian. The average life expectancy in North Weald is 80–82 years.

In terms of housing, over 28% of residents own their home, with a further 47% still owing a mortgage. 12% of residents live in council houses. Residents of North Weald also vary in terms of their trade. In 2011, the majority of North Weald residents worked in retail (16%). 13% worked in real estate and 12% in manufacturing. Unemployment in North Weald is low (2.0% in 2011).

The demographic are men between 40 and 44 who make up 9% of the total population. Women make up a similar number.

There are two care homes in North Weald, Leonard Davis House and Cunningham House to accommodate for the large proportion of residents who are over 60.

== Landmarks ==
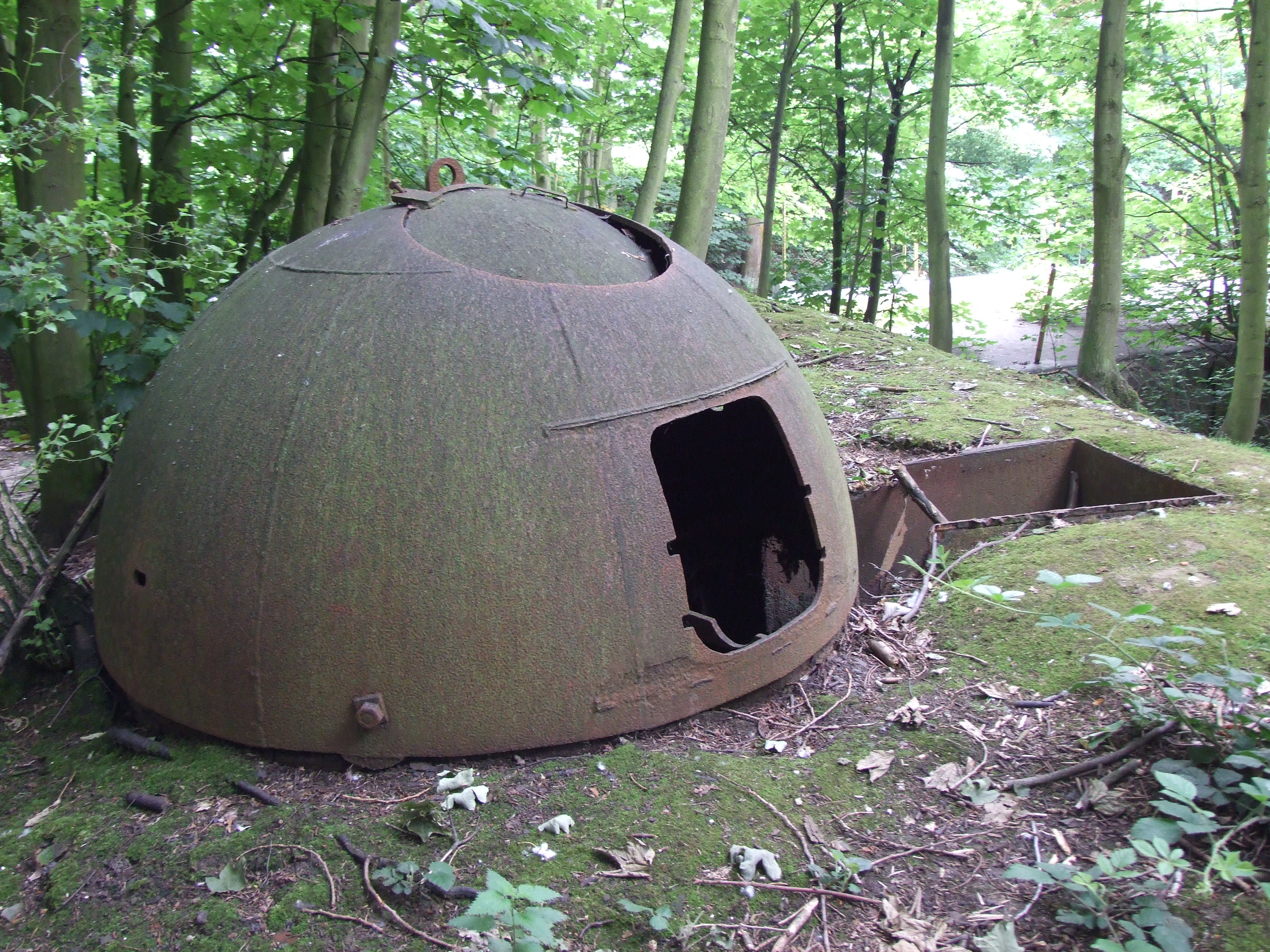
One of the Allan Williams turrets

- The Redoubt / Mobilisation Centre at North Weald was built in about 1880. Part of the London Defence Positions scheme, it was one of several built to provide ammunition to protect London if war ever broke out.
- The Allan Williams Turret is one of two built to protect a nearby radio station. The home guard were stationed here during the war to guard against sabotage and to assist in filling in bomb craters as the Luftwaffe used to try to knock out the transmitters. RAF North Weald is nearby and the control tower is viewable from the hill. Planes had to avoid hitting the masts as well. The place went through a series of changes of antenna type and redevelopments throughout the 1950s/60s and 1970s. Eventually it was shut down in the mid-1990s. Around 1997 there was fire caused by vandals, and C block was razed to the ground. Parts of some of the other blocks still exist including building E which is now used for comms to a Mobile Phone mast. The biggest attraction now is the antenna points and the redoubt over 100 years old.

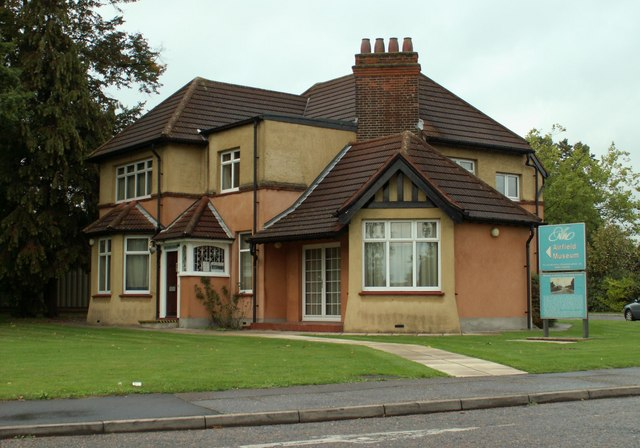
The airfield museum

- There is a Saturday open-air market based on the airfield which draws visitors from Essex and north London. It claims to be one of the largest open air markets in the UK. A bus service, subsidised by the company that owns the market, operates between the market and Harlow. The Market regularly attracts crowds estimated to be in excess of 10,000 on a weekly basis.
- The North Weald Airfield Museum is the people who worked at RAF North Weald in the First and Second World Wars, including both service personnel and civilians. Exhibits include photographs, personal memories, and artifacts about the airfield's history, including its role in the Battle of Britain, the American and Norwegian squadrons stationed there in the First World War, and the Royal Air Force squadrons stationed there over the years. The museum, with military vehicles and historic aircraft, is in the former RAF North Weald Station Office.
- The RAF North Weald Memorial is dedicated to all who served at North Weald. Located near the airfield's main gate and next to the museum. The memorial includes an obelisk erected in 1952 by the people of Norway in commemoration of the Norwegian airmen stationed at the airfield in World War II.

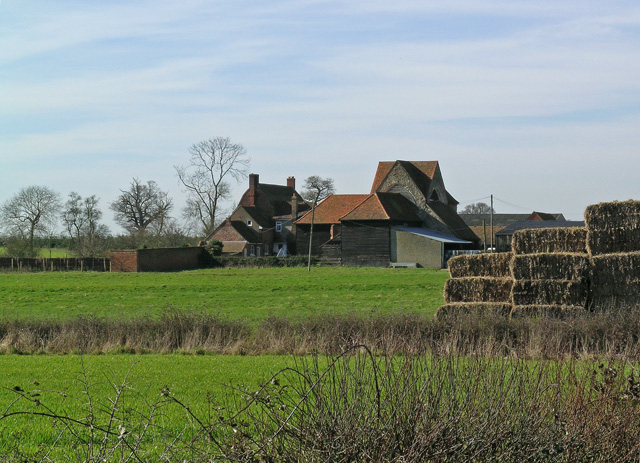
Latton Priory

- The village hall was founded in 1928 with land donated by the old Marconi company. This is where North Weald residents stage outdoor events, such as 'Dog Day'. The main hall was rebuilt in 1967, with only the rear stage area remaining from the old hall. A bar lounge was added in 1987. The hall holds events including spiritualist healing clinics, bagpipe practice, dancing and jazz. It also acts as the village polling station for all elections and referendums.
- Latton Priory was a small priory of Augustinian Canons Regular, rebuilt in the 14th century using flint rubble dressed with reused Roman brick, the remains of which are a Grade II listed building. The monument includes the site of the Augustinian priory of St John the Baptist, now Latton Priory Farm, and is located to the south of Harlow, approximately 1 km to the south west of junction 7 on the M11.
- The King's Head is one of the oldest pubs in the county of Essex, with parts of the structure dating back nearly 450 years. The main building is of half wood construction which dates back to the 17th century, and was originally built using old ships' timbers.

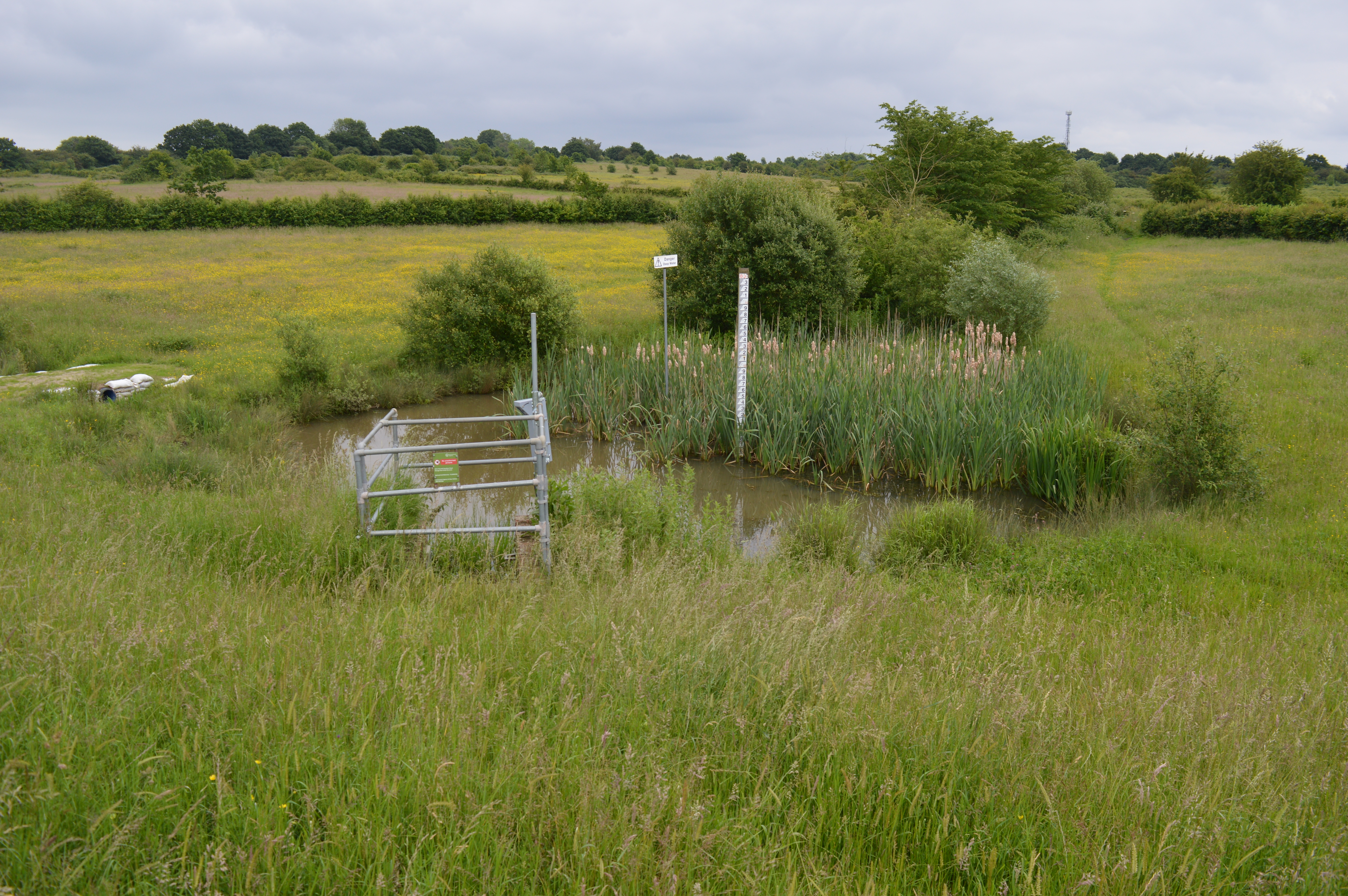
Weald Common. The radio aerial can be seen in the distance.

- North Weald station on the Epping Ongar heritage line, once in a state of disrepair, has been restored to 1940s LNER condition, complete with period lamps, footbridge and signage. The original 1888 signal box and lever frame, located on Platform 1, has also been attended to and restored. An “Anglia Buffet” coach restaurant and well-stocked gift shop help attract hundreds of thousands of tourists a year. Vintage buses travel out to Epping, Ongar or Shenfield. North Weald sends trains from its 3 platforms to Ongar or to Epping Forest, to a few meters from Epping Underground station platforms.
- North Weald is surrounded by numerous commons and fields such as Weald Common. These sloping fields flow down from the aerial mast and bowls club and is home to deer, rare birds and other animals

== Transport ==
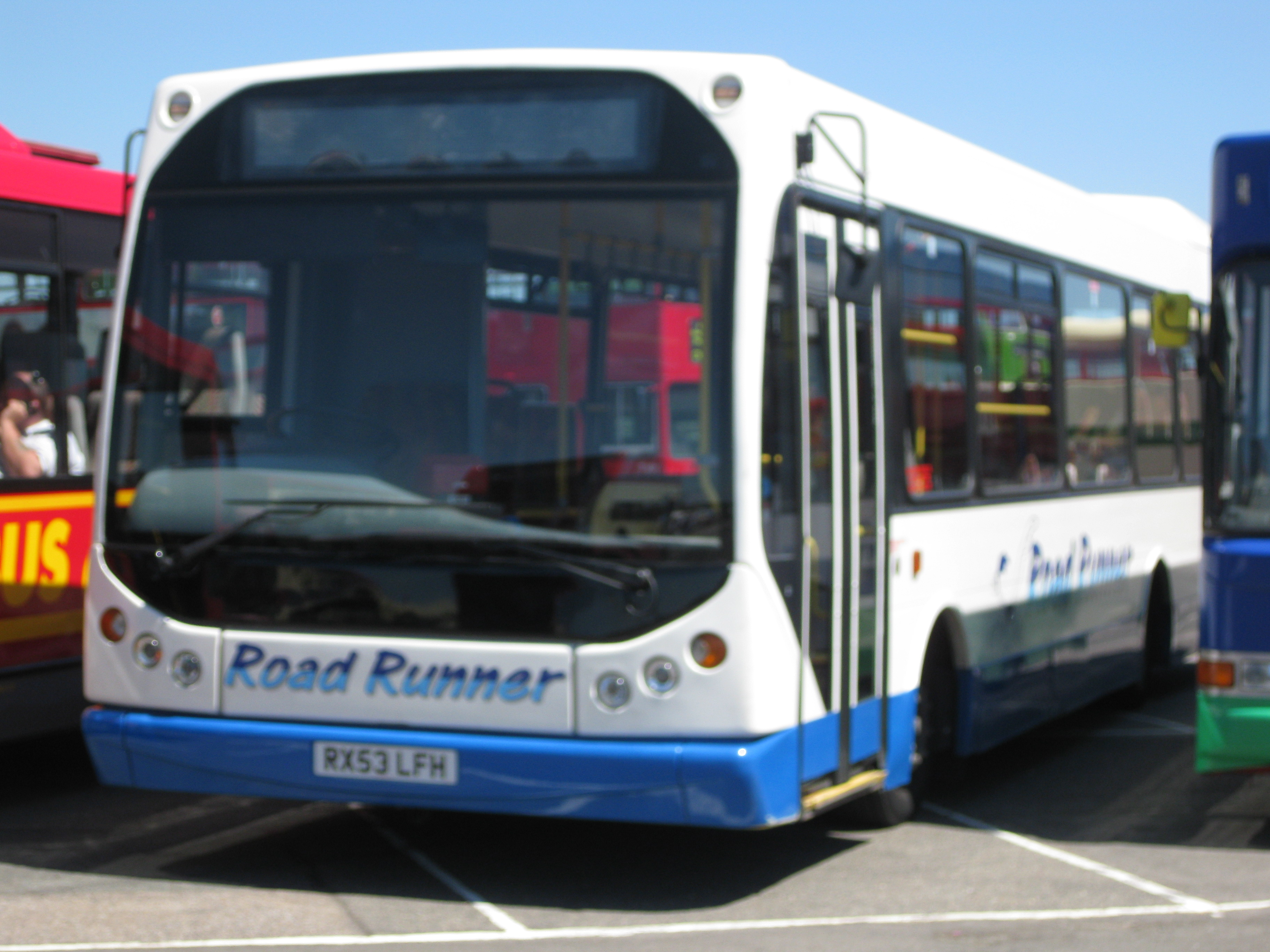
One of the buses used by the area.

The M11 motorway cuts through the middle of the parish and has a junction with the A414 road. The southern boundary runs parallel to the heritage Epping Ongar Railway and makes a small deviation to include the whole of North Weald railway station. The nearest regularly served stations are outside the parish, with Harlow Town railway station 2 miles (3 km) to the north-west and Epping tube station 1 mile (2 km) to the south-west of the extreme edge of the parish border.

=== Bus ===
Bus services are mostly provided by Vectare and Central Connect. Other services are provided by First Essex and Stephensons of Essex.

Local bus routes 13C, 18/18C, 420, 420A, 491, 492, 620 and Epping Ongar Railway Vintage Route 339 serve the station and North Weald village.

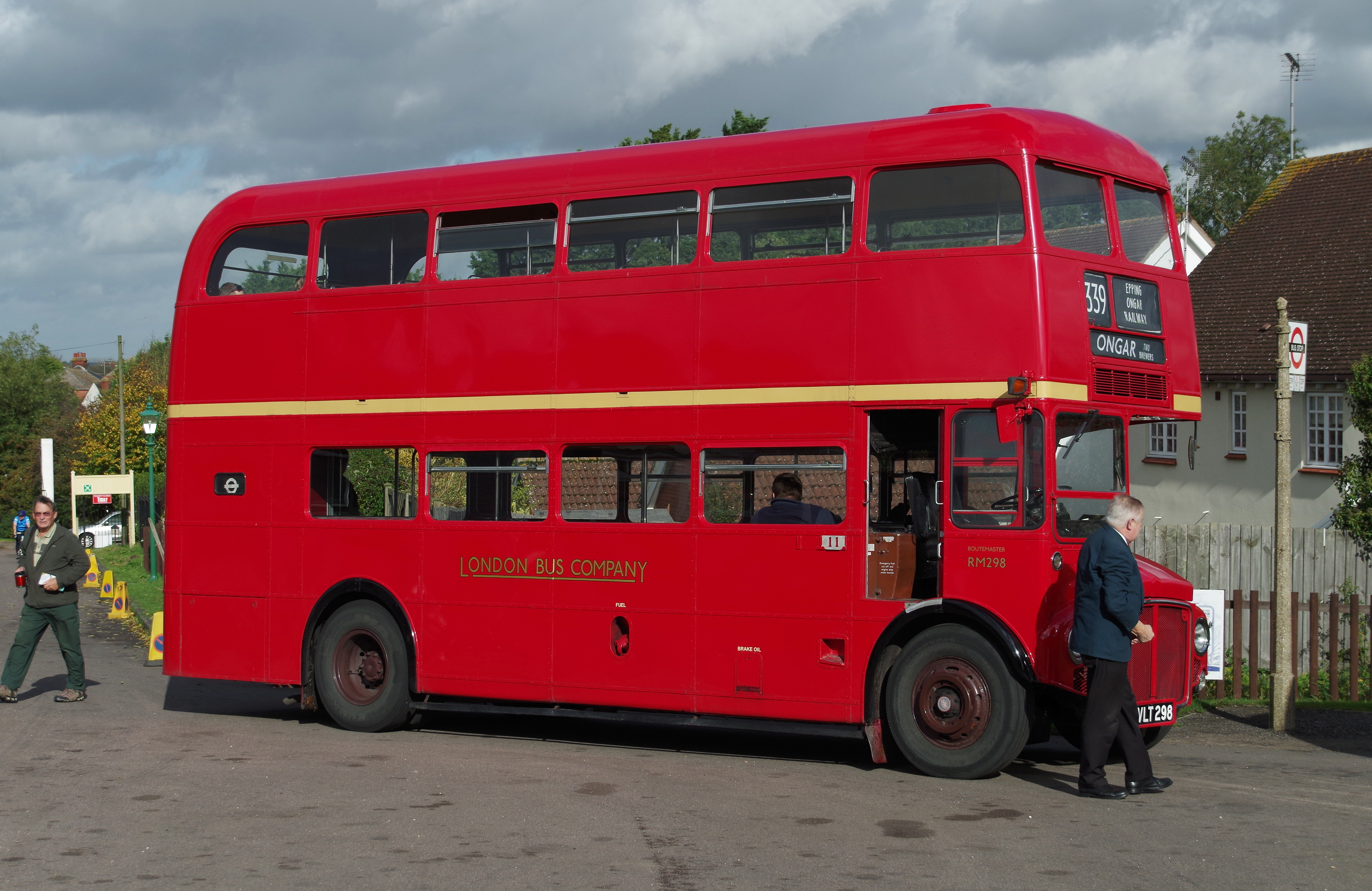
A heritage vintage bus.

=== Train ===
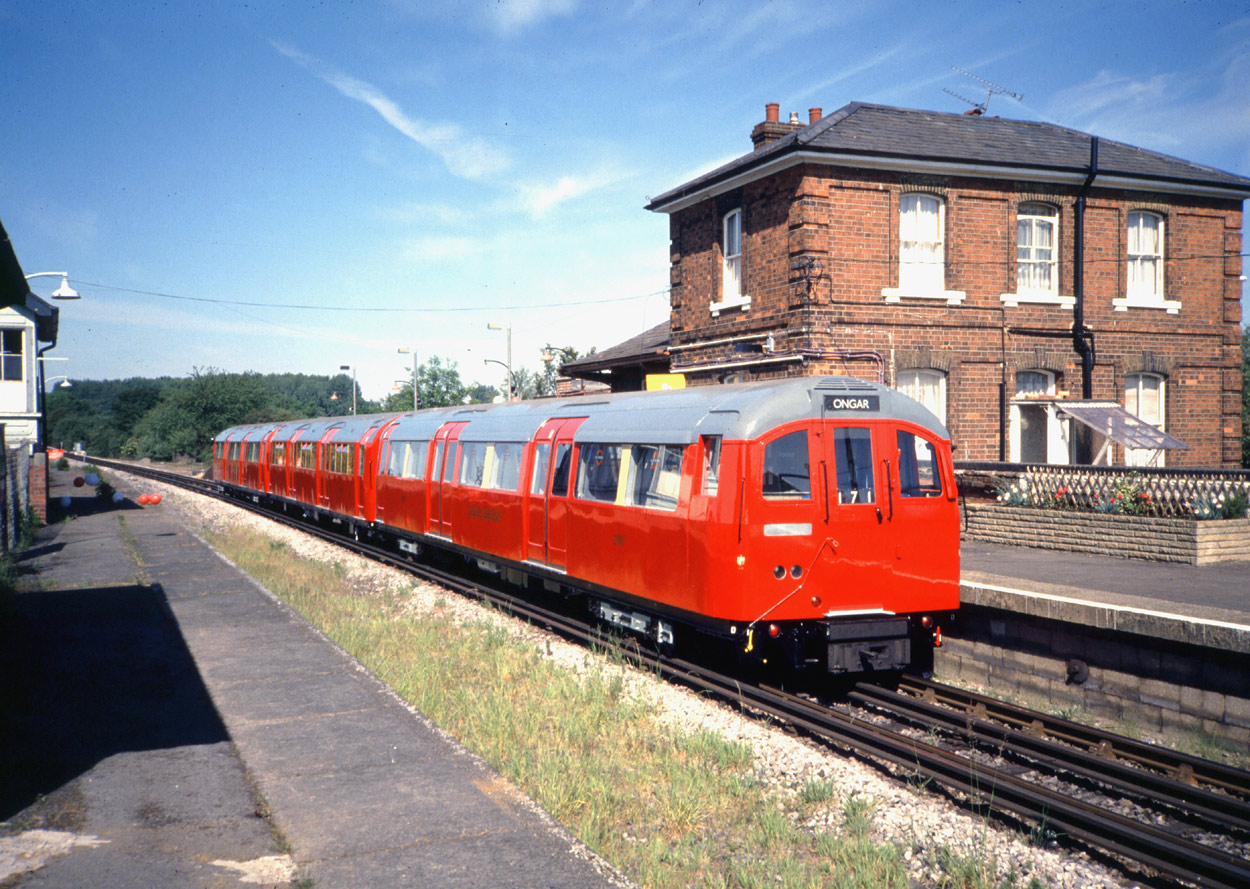
Pre 1994 North Weald station when London Underground owned the line.

The nearest London Underground service to the village is Epping which is served by the Central line. The closest National Rail service is from Harlow Town, which is served by the West Anglia Main Line and is operated by Greater Anglia.

The Epping to Ongar branch was not heavily used and became increasingly unprofitable. The service was further undermined when the Greater London Council removed the running subsidy for the line because it was not within the boundary of Greater London, and no comparable subsidy was forthcoming from the local government agencies in Essex, which meant that fare levels were much higher than on the rest of the Underground network. Initially, the Sunday service was dropped, and then the Saturday service. Subsequently, the service was restricted to a rush hour service only of seven trains in each direction per day (three in the morning and four in the evening). London Transport (later London Underground Ltd) had made repeated representations to the government to close the line, but each was refused as there was no alternative mode of transport between Epping and Ongar.

A final request was made in 1994 with a proviso that the line was to be sold to a private organisation which would continue to run the services. With the promise of continued services, the government finally agreed to London Underground closing the line. The line, including North Weald station, was closed on 30 September 1994.

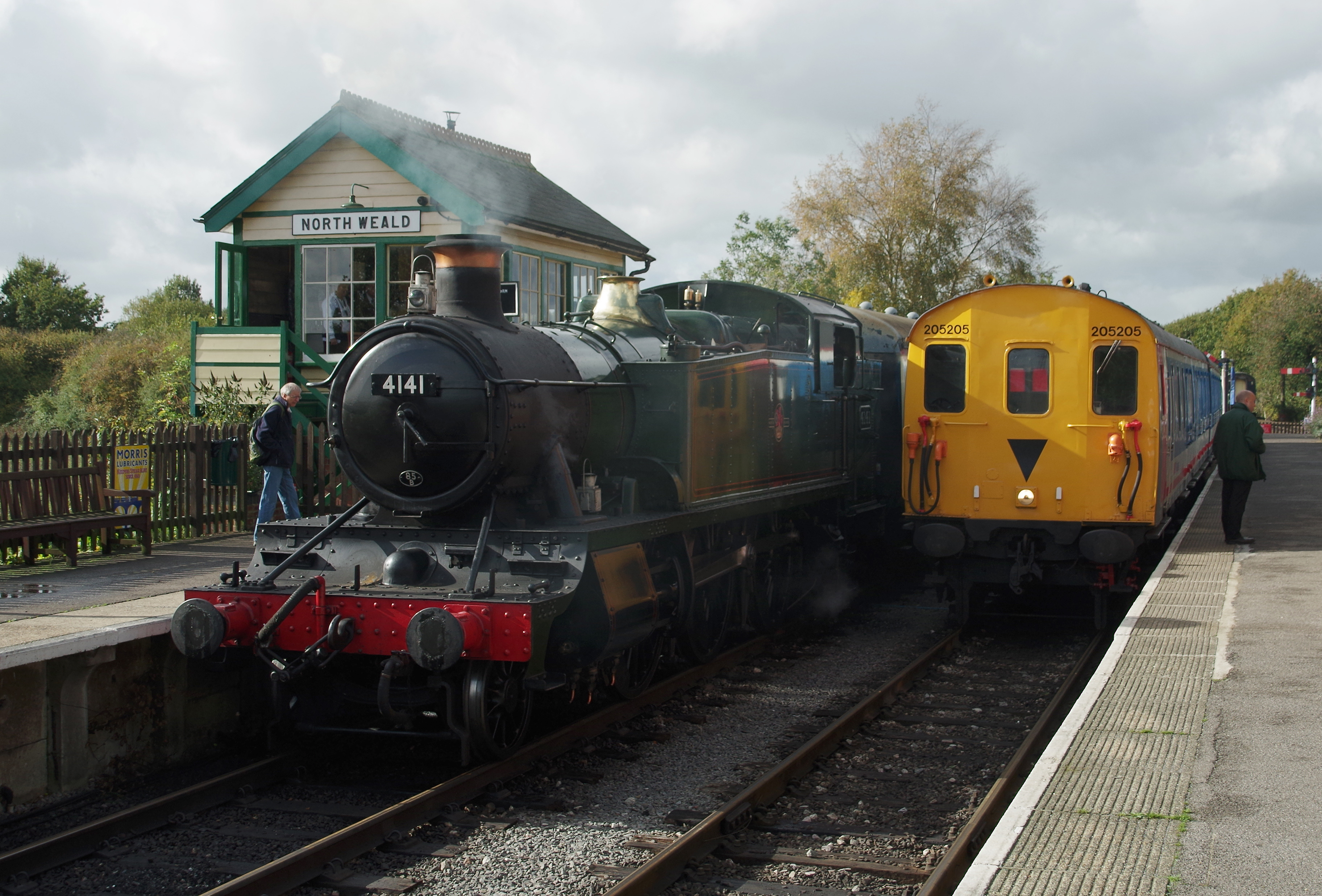
Steam locomotive, Packford Hall on platform 1. Pictured with signal box.

It was not until 2004 that a volunteer force restored a partial service as a heritage railway, although this was closed later. After officially opening in 2012 as a heritage service Because London Underground would not provide platform space at Epping, North Weald is currently the westernmost terminus of the line, though a shuttle runs further west as far as Coopersale, though there are no station facilities there. It is intended to run to a separate station facility near Epping station in the future.

The station itself has been extensively restored, with all the rooms being restored to their original uses, restoring the station to British Rail colours. The original GER signalbox dating from 1888 is being restored, complete with its original lever frame, as part of the works to signal the passing loop which has been reinstated through the station. The westbound platform has been restored, with a new accessible ramp installed and an original GER latticework footbridge (formerly from Woodford) erected.

The branch once again runs locomotive-hauled trains between Ongar and North Weald, with a diesel shuttle towards Coopersale and connecting heritage buses to Epping.

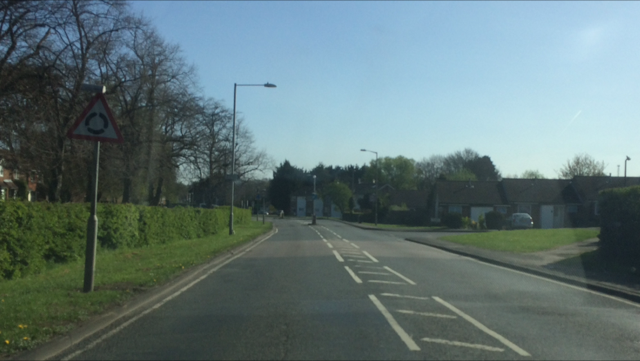
The B181 road runs through the town from Epping.

=== Road ===
A number of major arterial roads (B181 to Epping and A414 to London, Newmarket and, in the opposite direction, to Chelmsford) run nearby. The main road from London to Newmarket and Norwich runs through the west and that from Epping to Chelmsford through the south of the parish. A large R.A.F. station and wireless masts are prominent features of the landscape and there has recently been much domestic building. But some parts of North Weald are still rural and accessible through rural lanes.

=== Air ===
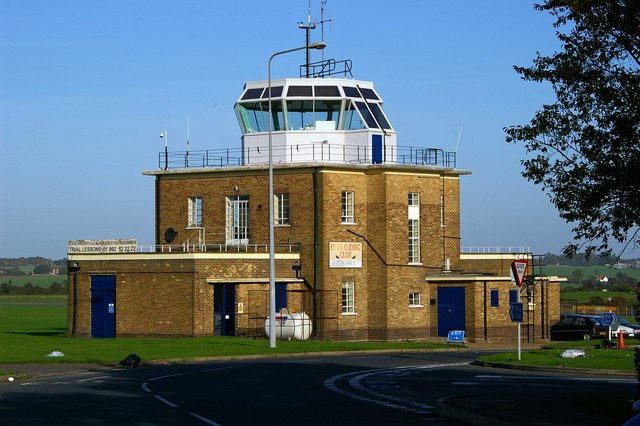
The airfield control tower

An iconic WW2 airfield remains popular with private flyers, North Weald Airfield owned by Epping Forest District Council. It is the home of North Weald Airfield Museum. Although unlicensed, it is home to many private aircraft and historic types and is host to a wide range of events throughout the year, including the Air-Britain Classic Fly-in and smaller airshows. On occasions North Weald has 300 to 500 movements a day.

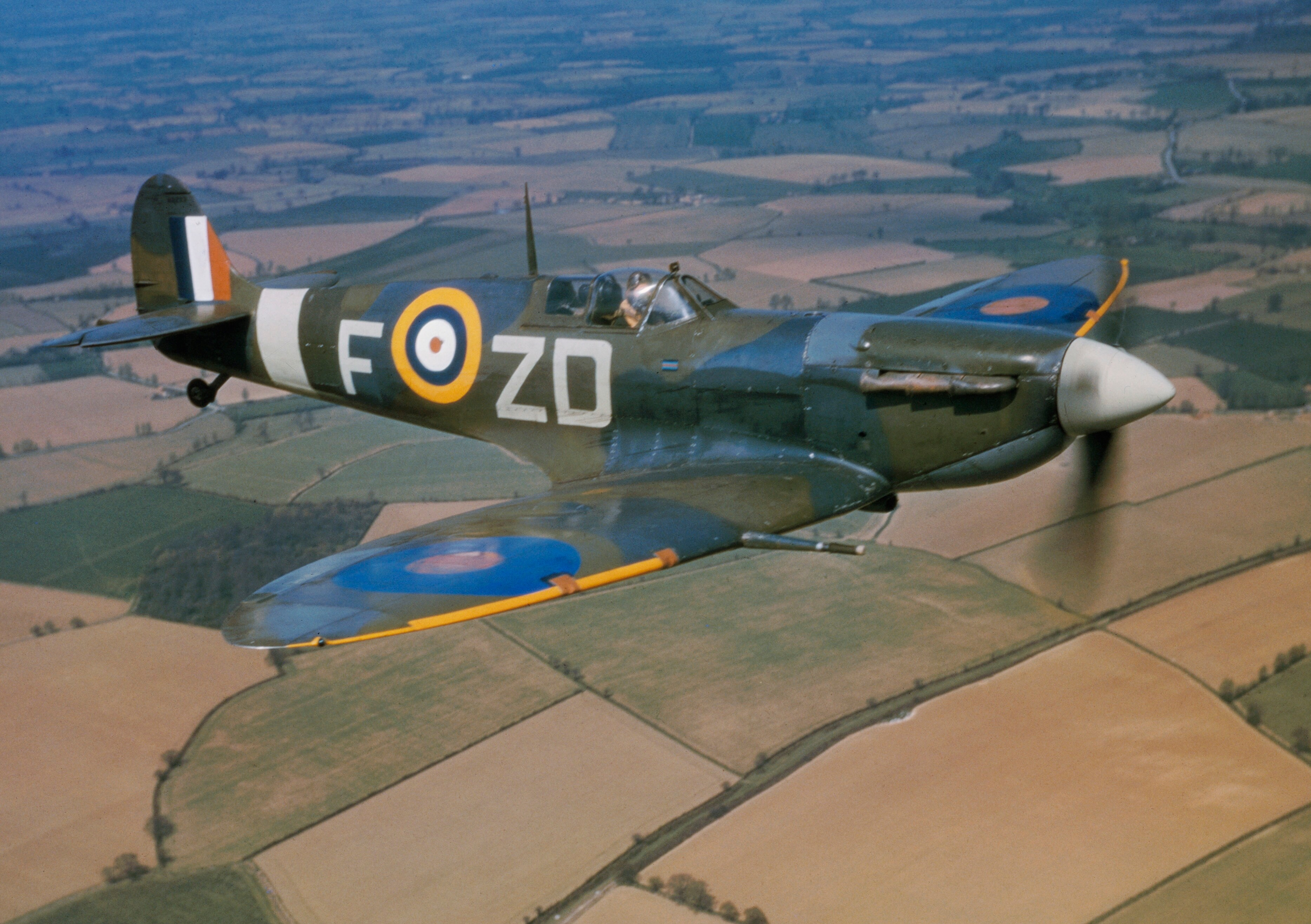
Spitfire over North Weald, 1942.

North Weald is home to several vintage and veteran aircraft such as the Spitfire, Mustang, Kittyhawk, Dakota, Skyraider, Seafire and Harvard, and also home to early ex-military jets such as the Hunter, Venom, Vampire, Gnat, Jet Provost, along with general aviation types such as the SportCruiser, Cessna 172, Piper PA28, Aero AT3 and the Cirrus SR22. Resident organizations include Area 51, Hangar 11 Collection, Aces High, and Kennet Aviation.

An original 1927 hangar remains, as does the former Officers Mess. Some former married quarters dating from the early 1970s (and now in private ownership) can be seen in Lancaster and York Roads. A Hawker Hurricane Mk1 replica has been erected near the main gate and can be viewed on market days. The former officer's mess was granted Grade II listed status in 2005, with the control tower receiving the same status in 2013.

== Sport ==
Bantham and Ongar Bowls Club plays behind the Talbot pub.

North Weald Cricket Club was formed in 1983 and started playing in 1984. They play home matches at the Memorial Playing Field. The Saturday team play in the Herts and Essex Boarder Cricket League division 1. The club also play friendlies on Sundays.

Blakes 18-hole golf course is at North Weald North Weald also has a par 3 golf course on High road opposite the Airfield.

== Education ==
The village school is St Andrew's Christian Primary school. This school is a two-form primary school. There are two nurseries and pre-schools. The county council also runs a small library which doubles up as a meeting room for the parish council.

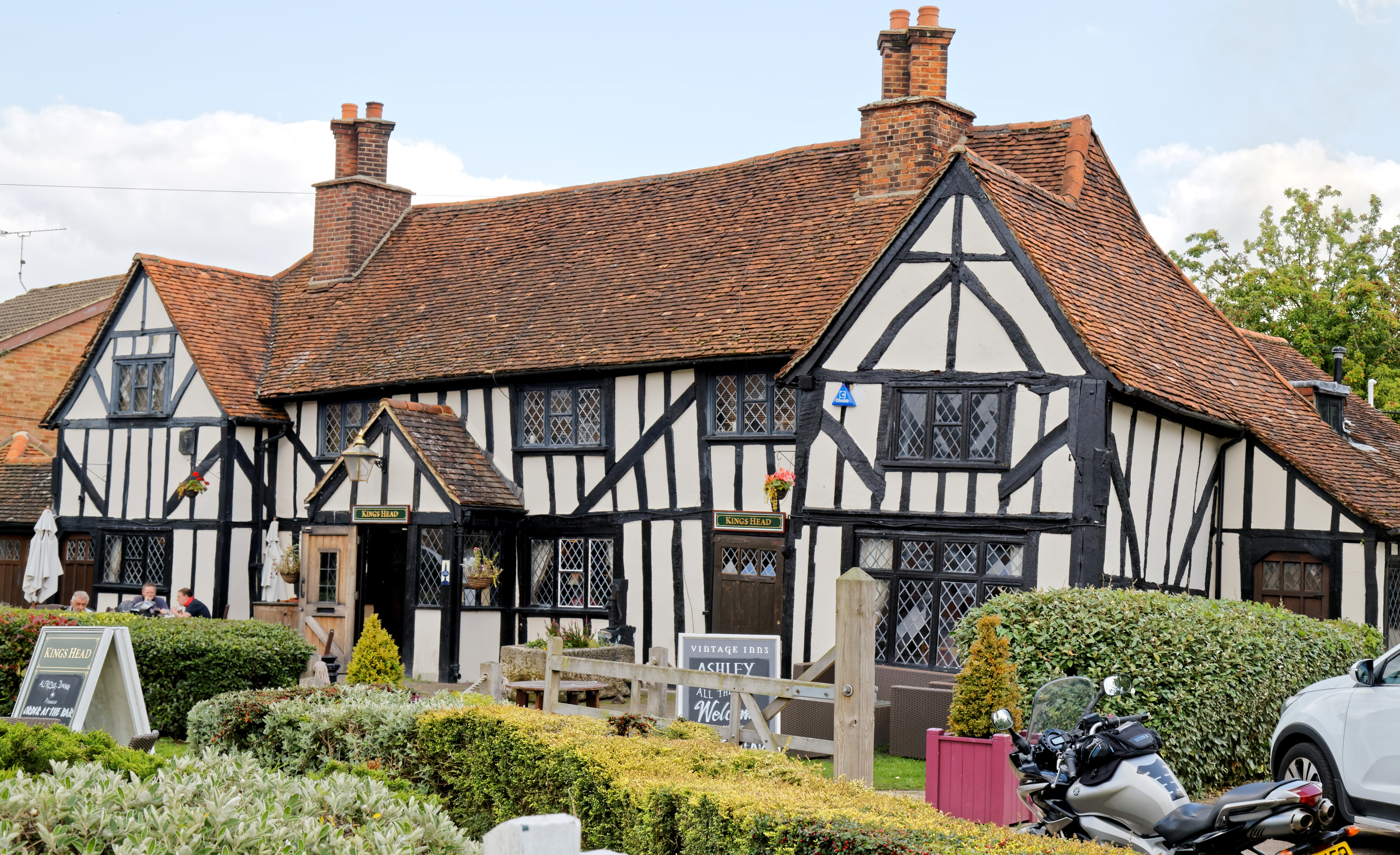
The King's Head Pub, the oldest in the area.

== Notable people ==
Richard Biscoe (d. 1748), a nonconformist minister who later conformed and became chaplain to George II and Boyle lecturer 1736–38, was Vicar of North Weald from 1738 to 1748.

== Media ==
In the 1990s, the Aces High hangar was used as the home for Channel 4's TV game show The Crystal Maze, which had moved from Shepperton Studios because of lack of space.

A sketch for BBC television's The Armstrong & Miller Show was filmed at the railway station. The sketch depicted Miller's character attempting to commit suicide from the old station bridge. Armstrong's character, a railway guard, comes and tells Miller's character that trains aren't running but a replacement bus service is in operation. The camera cuts to the station car park with Miller's character just under some bus wheels; the bus is then ordered to drive forward with a bump being seen.

Channel Four's television show Chewing Gum filmed part of their second series (broadcast 2017) down Vicarage Lane.

Boy George's team filmed on the railway for his 2013 music video "Coming Home". The shoot included both afternoon and evening filming of a train composed of stock of various arrangements from the chosen vintage period, giving backdrops for a wide range of scenes.

Sacha Baron Cohen's film Grimsby (2016) was also filmed at North Weald station and around the area.
