= Hastingwood =

Hamlet in Essex, England

Coordinates: 51.747248°N 0.14992068°E

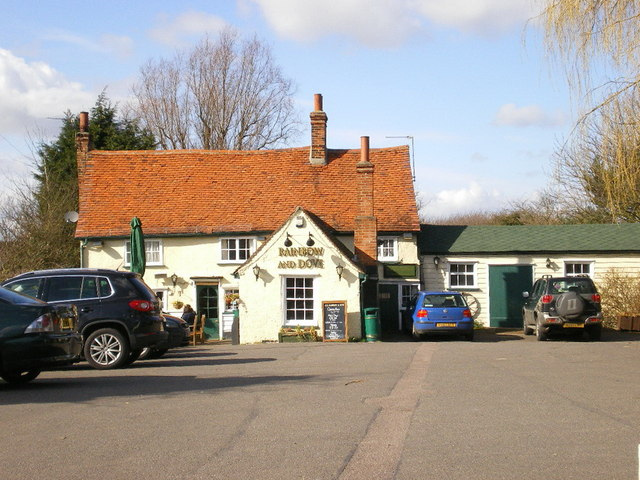
- The Rainbow and Dove pub

- Location within Essex
- Population: 315
- OS grid reference: TL485075
- Civil parish: North Weald Bassett
- District: Epping Forest
- Shire county: Essex
- Region: East
- Country: England
- Sovereign state: United Kingdom
- Post town: Harlow
- Postcode district: CM17
- Dialling code: 01992
- Police: Essex
- Fire: Essex
- Ambulance: East of England
- UK Parliament: Harlow

Hastingwood is a hamlet in the civil parish of North Weald Bassett, in the Epping Forest district of Essex, England. The hamlet is centred on the junction of Hastingwood Road, which runs southwest to the A414 road and the Hastingwood Junction 7 of the M11 motorway, and Mill Street, which runs north to Harlow Common and Potter Street. Nearby settlements include the town of Harlow, North Weald and the hamlet of Foster Street.

== History ==
The earliest records of Hastingwood originate from 1086 when the Paris Hall estate was founded. The remains of the estate lie on Hastingwood Road, with the mansion house dating from the 1500s still standing and given Grade II protection in 1952.

In 1520, Hastingwood was formerly listed as 'Hazelwood' due to its proximity to a local copse of hazel trees in the Paris Hall estate. It was renamed Hastingwood in around the 1700s.

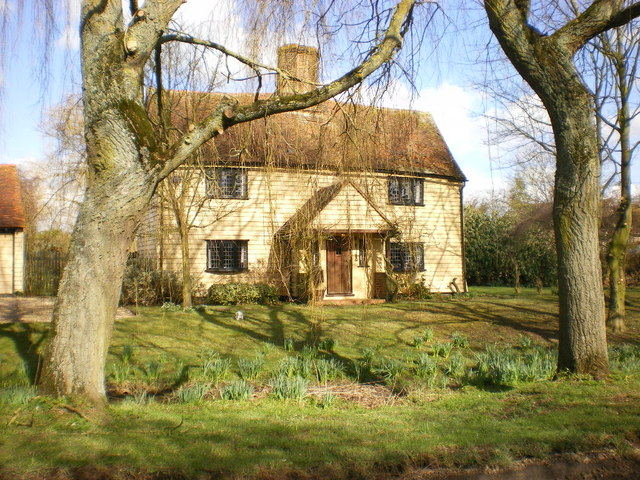
Shonks Farm: One of the old farms in Hastingwood

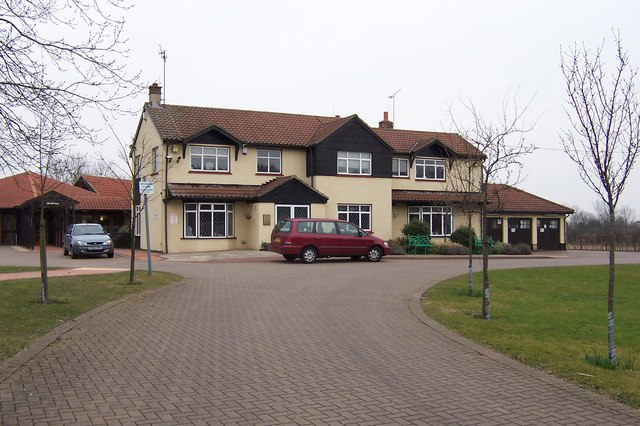
St Clare's Hospice

The village served as Oliver Cromwell's armoury during the English Civil War in 1645. Hastingwood has large flint deposits which were utilised in the production of weaponry and armour. During this period the main estate of Paris Hall was rebuilt (1600).

Since 1777, the village has undergone expansion. The majority of the growth in Hastingwood centred around the common on Hastingwood Road. In this period, Hastingwood Farm (currently the Rainbow and Dove) was erected as a timber framed farmhouse.

There was further building development in the 19th century. Hastingwood House was erected in 1840 as a large gault brick house with farming rights. The inclosure of the common in 1861 resulted in further building development. Hastingwood established its first church in 1864 as a chapel of ease. This was part of a process of decentralising the parish, distributing the population towards the areas of Thornwood and Hastingwood.

Hastingwood Farm was renamed 'The Rainbow Inn' (after the name of the owner) and became used as a stop for travellers with their horses between Cambridge and London. The further renaming of the inn to 'The Rainbow and Dove' came after travellers noticed a topiary bird, they believed was a dove, on the grounds of the inn.

In the 20th century, the population expanded slightly up until the 1920s and plateaued until 1945, after-which, in the post-Second World War period, it rose. The proximity of Hastingwood to North Weald Airfield also served as a reason why housing development was required.

In 1949, Hastingwood was incorporated into the North Weald Bassett parish and removed from the Harlow Hundred. Between the 1940s and 1950s the 'Rainbow and Dove' was used as a dance hall but eventually this ended. The old, disused farm buildings used by 'The Rainbow and Dove' were demolished in 1954 leaving only the main farm house which is now a public house and restaurant.

The M11 motorway, which runs near the west of the village, was completed in 1980. St Clare's Hospice was established at the south of the village and opened by Baroness Jay of Paddington in 1990. The chapel of ease has since been converted to a dwelling.

== Governance ==
Hastingwood is represented at Westminster by Chris Vince, MP for Harlow. This is a marginal constituency, it was held by Labour from 1997 to 2010 and the Conservatives from 2010 until 2024, when it was retaken by Labour. Locally it is a strongly Conservative area with the Conservatives winning 60% of the vote in 2015's local elections.

Hastingwood is represented at the Essex County Council by the Conservative county councillor for North Weald and Nazeing, having won the 2017 election with 78.5% of the vote, followed by Labour with 12.7%.

2017 County Council election: North Weald & Nazeing
Party	Candidate	Votes	%	±%
Conservative	Anthony Jackson	3,081	78.5	+30.9
Labour	Stefan Mullard	500	12.7	+0.7
Liberal Democrats	Arnold Verrall	346	8.8	+6.4
Majority		2,581	65.7	+51.5
Turnout		3,953	27.4	+2.7
Conservative hold		Swing	+15.1	

On the district council, Hastingwood is represented by one currently Independent councillor. Re-election for the position is in 2019. Hastingwood is one of the seats on the Epping Forest District Council to have only one councillor.

Hastingwood, Matching & Sheering Village (compared to 2012 election)
Party	Candidate	Votes	%	±%
Independent	Richard Morgan	648	46.1	▼41.3
Conservative	Joanne Share-Bernia	597	42.5	N/A
Labour	Sandra Jenner	160	11.3	N/A
Majority		51	3.6	▼71.2
Turnout		1,405	74%	▲29%
Independent hold		Swing		

The village is governed by a parish council. The parish council covers the North Weald Bassett parish and represents the settlements of North Weald, Thornwood, Hastingwood, Tyler's Green and Foster Street. Fifteen unelected councillors are part of the council. The council manages such things as local cemeteries, green space, recreational grounds, and allotments.

== Geography ==
The highest parts of the parish are in the south and west, rising to 322 feet (98 m). The land slopes downwards from this point to the main area of housing at the point in which Hastingwood Road and Mill Street split.

Hastingwood is 2.5 miles (4 km) east of Harlow, 3.5 miles (6 km) north-east of Epping and 5 miles (8 km) north-west of Chipping Ongar. The county town of Chelmsford is approximately 14 miles (23 km) to the east.

The Shonks Brook stream runs into the village from North Weald. It is a tributary of Cripsey Brook which flows from Ongar and through the surrounding area.

The land is predominantly arable with much land used for farming. Hastingwood is a linear street village. There are four farms within the parish.

== Demography ==
Historical population
Year	Pop.	±%
1861	164	—
1981	291	+77.4%
1991	290	−0.3%
2001	303	+4.5%
2011	313	+3.3%
2015 estimate	315	+0.6%

As of 2011 there are 143 households with an average household size of 2.2. The village is populated sparsely.

Thirteen inhabitants of the village are of Indian, African or other background. Twelve were born outside of the UK. The majority of the population identify as Christian with the significant other half as atheist.

Fifty-nine residents own their own home with 49 still owing a mortgage. There is one house subsidised by the council. Residents of Hastingwood vary in terms of their trade. In 2011, 14% of the village worked in construction, followed by 17.5% working in health and retail. Unemployment in Hastingwood stands at 2.8%.

The population includes 50.7%, and 49.3% men. The majority of the population (22%) are between the ages of 45–59. The next largest age groups are those between the ages of 30–44 and 0–4. 1.2% of the village are aged 90+ years old.

== Landmarks ==
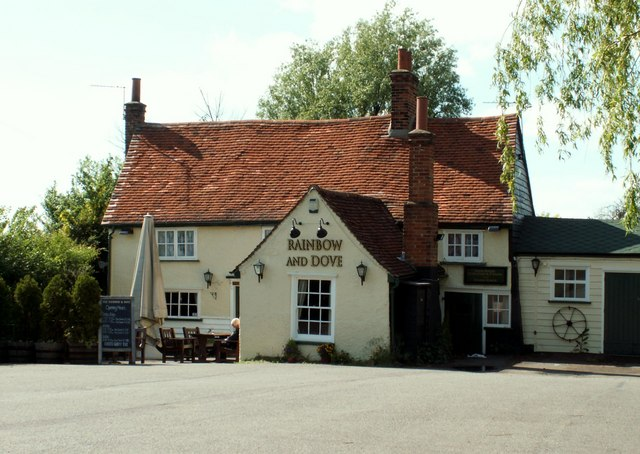
The Rainbow and Dove original farmhouse

Hastingwood's public house is the Grade II listed Rainbow and Dove, which dates to the 17th century. Further Grade II listed buildings include farmhouses, barns and cottages, and Paris Hall which dates to the mid-16th century.

Harlow Garden Centre stands just off Hastingwood Road across the A414 near the Hastingwood Interchange roundabout.

Hastingwood Village Hall off Hastingwood Road was originally built in 1922, but refurbished and restored in 2014 and was opened by the Conservative MP Robert Halfon; the hall holds village events.

== Transport ==
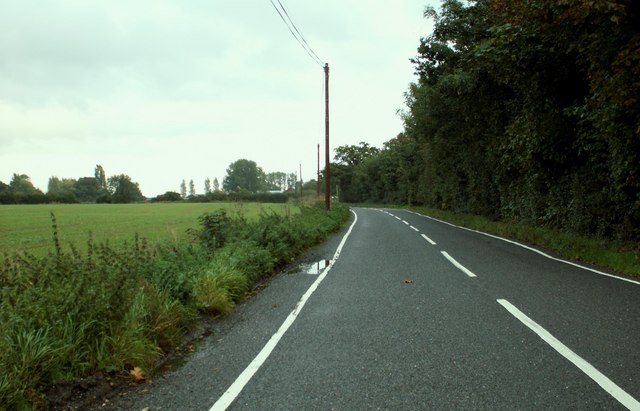
Hastingwood Road approaching the village from the Rainbow and Dove

The nearest London Underground service to the village is Epping which is served by the Central Line. The closest National Rail service is from Harlow Town, which is served by the West Anglia Main Line and is operated by Greater Anglia.

No buses run through Hastingwood. The only buses which run near the village are at the Hastingwood Interchange, a roundabout above the M11 motorway, on the A414. Buses run from Harlow through to Epping and to Ongar along the A414.

A number of major arterial roads (B181 to Epping and A414 to London, Newmarket and, in the opposite direction, to Chelmsford) run nearby. The main road from London to Newmarket and Norwich runs through the west and that from Epping to Chelmsford through the south of the parish.
