= Thorley Street =

Village on the Isle of Wight, England

Coordinates: 50°41′43″N 1°27′58″W

Thorley Street is a village on the Isle of Wight. It is located four kilometres from Totland in the northwest of the island. It is in the civil parish of Yarmouth.
