= Threewaters =

Threewaters is a hamlet south of Nanstallon, Cornwall, England, United Kingdom.
