= Thornwood Common =

Village in Essex, England

Coordinates: 51.7213°N 0.128762°E

- Location within Essex
- Area: 0.362 km^{2} (0.140 sq mi)
- Population: 1,016 (2018 estimate)
  - Density: 2,807/km^{2} (7,270/sq mi)
- OS grid reference: TL471046
  - London: 15 mi (24 km) SSW
- Civil parish: North Weald Bassett
- District: Epping Forest
- Shire county: Essex
- Region: East
- Country: England
- Sovereign state: United Kingdom
- Police: Essex
- Fire: Essex
- Ambulance: East of England

Thornwood Common is a village on the B1393 road, in the civil parish of North Weald Bassett and the Epping Forest district of Essex, England. In 2018 it had an estimated population of 1016.

The town of Epping is 1 mile (1.6 km) to the south. The hamlet of Thornwood is conjoined to the village at the north. Thornwood Common Flood Meadow is a Local Nature Reserve.
