= Tholomas Drove =

Hamlet in Cambridgeshire, England

Coordinates: 52.6340°N 0.0659°E

- Location within Cambridgeshire
- OS grid reference: TF3906
- District: Fenland
- Shire county: Cambridgeshire
- Region: East
- Country: England
- Sovereign state: United Kingdom
- Post town: Wisbech
- Postcode district: PE13
- Dialling code: 01945
- Police: Cambridgeshire
- Fire: Cambridgeshire
- Ambulance: East of England

Tholomas Drove is a hamlet in Wisbech St Mary civil parish, part of the Fenland district in the Isle of Ely, Cambridgeshire, England. The population is included in the civil parish of Parson Drove. In 1989, there were 120 residents. The origins of the name are unclear but it has also been written as Tholomer's Drove and Tallamass Drove.

== Hardy's School ==
In the early eighteenth century Francis Hardy, a prominent local Quaker, built a schoolroom and schoolmaster's house. Hardy died in 1727 and, in his will, left twelve acres of land on trust with the instructions that it "should keep six or more poor children of the parish at school." Further land was added to the bequest by subsequent trustees. By 1814 the income was in excess of sixty pounds per annum and in the 1830s free education was provided to twenty-one children, with more paying the schoolmaster directly. By 1850 this had increased to twenty-five free places. During the nineteenth century the schoolmasters included John Burman, William Redin Stanton, later the founder of Barton School, and George Hardwicke. Until the National School movement reached Wisbech St Mary parish in the 1870s, Hardy's was the only school serving the parish. After Hardwicke's death in 1883 the school closed.

However, the school building remained and became a Mission chapel. In 1894 the first Wisbech St Mary civil parish council met there and used it as their meeting place for nearly sixty years. For many years the results of local authority elections were also declared in the room. It became known as The Forrester's Hall, after the friendly society of that name, and later the Court House. The building fell into disuse and was demolished in 1996.

Primitive Methodist and mission chapels were built in the hamlet.

The Chequers Inn is a public house in the hamlet.
