= Thornhills =

Hamlet in West Yorkshire, England

Coordinates: 53.711°N 1.771°W

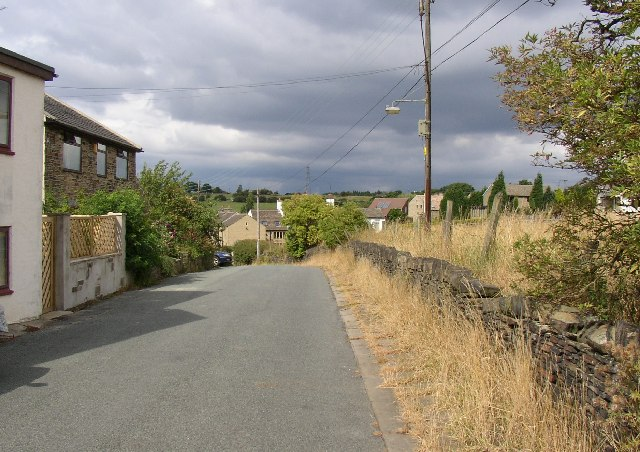
- Looking north along Thornhills Lane

- Location within West Yorkshire
- Metropolitan borough: Calderdale
- Metropolitan county: West Yorkshire
- Region: Yorkshire and the Humber
- Country: England
- Sovereign state: United Kingdom

Thornhills is a hamlet in the Calderdale district, in the county of West Yorkshire, England. It is near the town of Brighouse.

In 2023, Calderdale Council adopted a plan to build 3,000 new homes on land at Thornhills and Woodhouse. The new development has been dubbed "Thornhills Garden Community".
