= Thornby, Cumbria =

Village in Cumbria, England

Coordinates: 54.861°N 3.098°W

Thornby
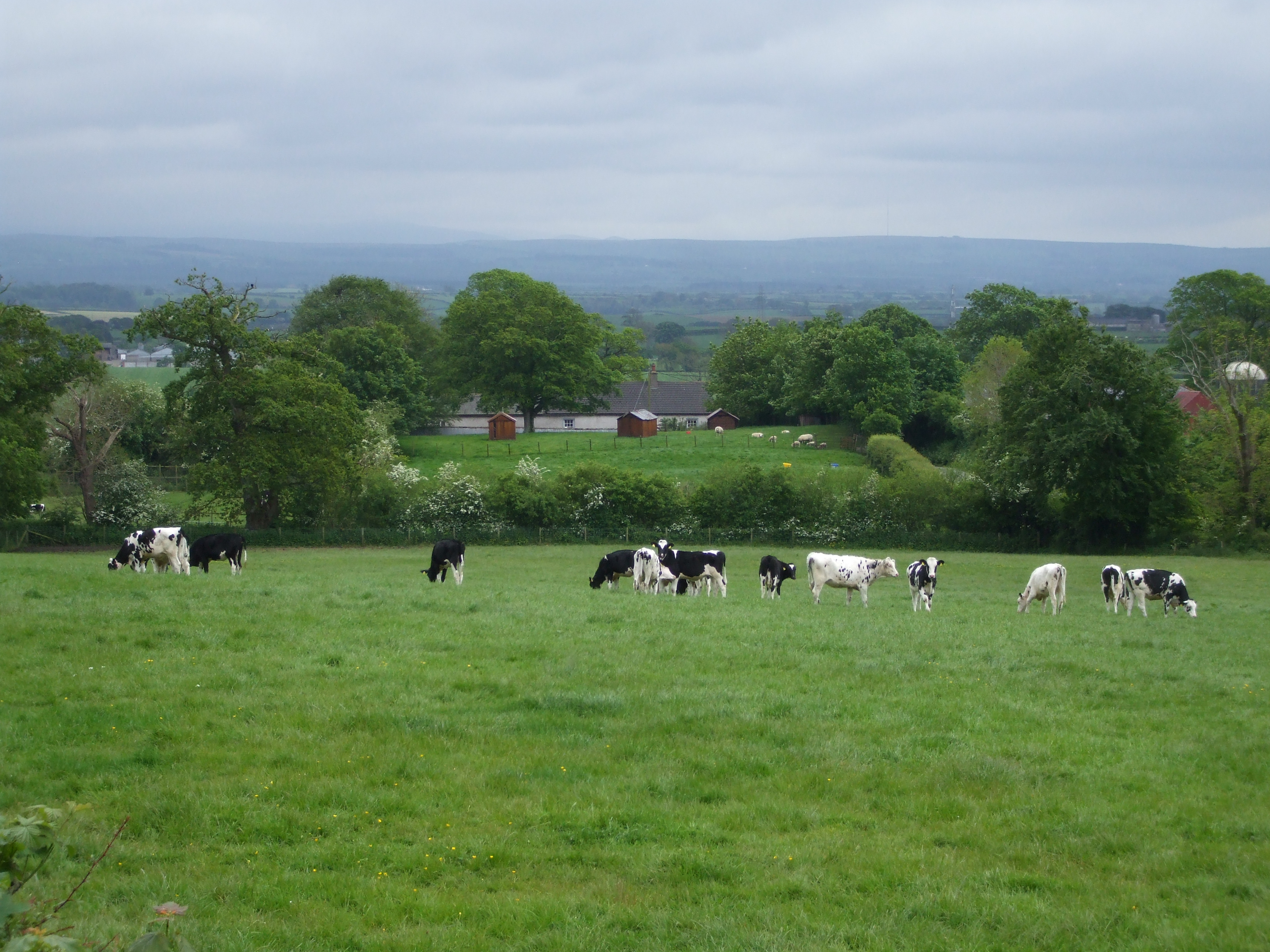
- Wooden Sheds stand on a castle site on the outskirt of Thornby. Hugh de Morville claimed to hold a castle here that was burnt by the Scots in 1232.

- Location in Allerdale, Cumbria Location within Cumbria
- OS grid reference: NY295524
- Civil parish: Aikton
- Unitary authority: Cumberland
- Ceremonial county: Cumbria
- Region: North West
- Country: England
- Sovereign state: United Kingdom
- Post town: WIGTON
- Postcode district: CA7
- Dialling code: 016973
- Police: Cumbria
- Fire: Cumbria
- Ambulance: North West
- UK Parliament: Penrith and Solway

Thornby is a village in Cumbria, England.
