= Thorncross =

Hamlet on the Isle of Wight, England

Coordinates: 50°38′01″N 1°22′52″W

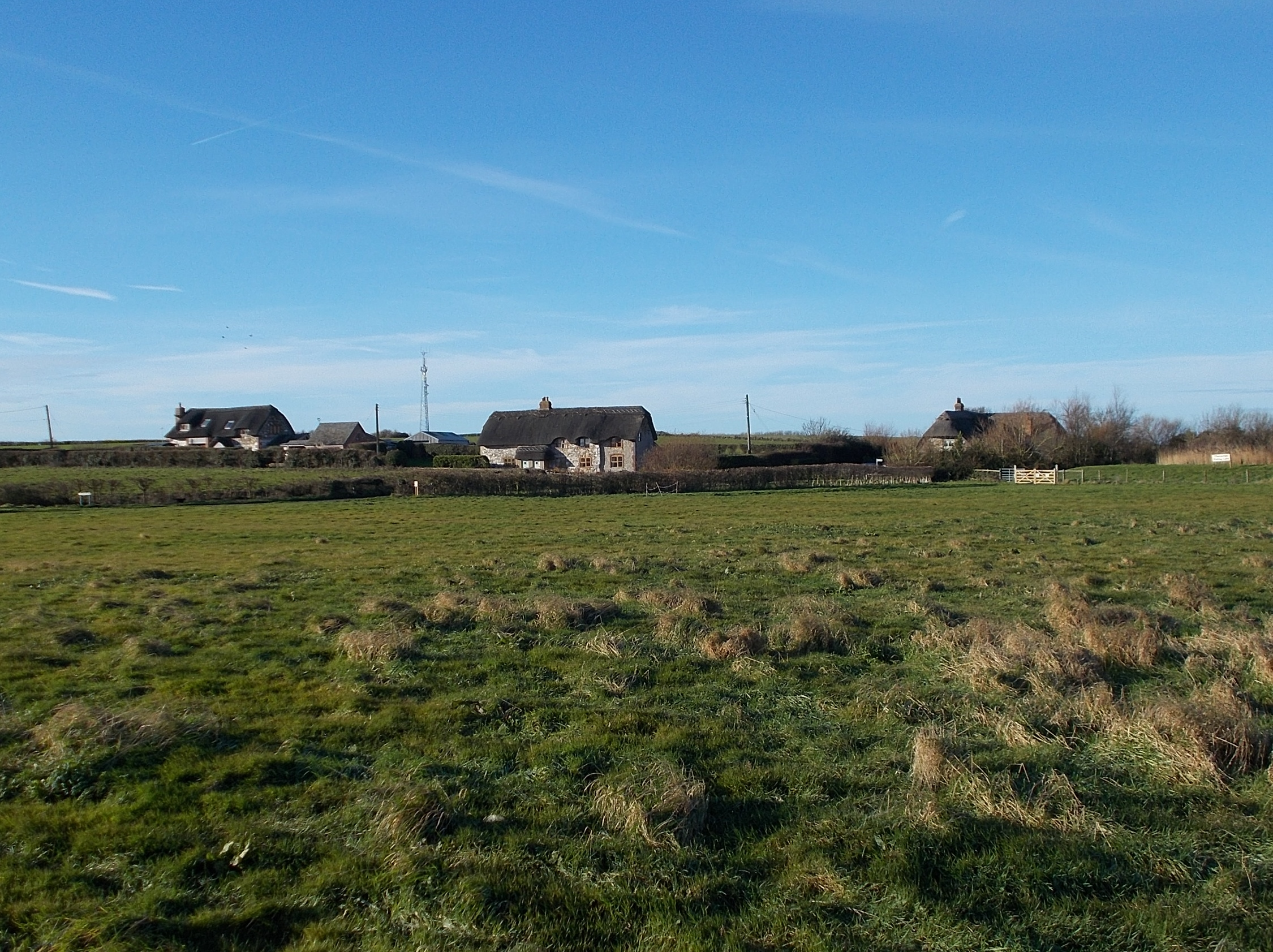
Thorncross

Thorncross is a small hamlet in the south west of the Isle of Wight, England. (The Back of the Wight). It is located near the hamlets of Yafford, Limerstone and the village of Brighstone.

== Name ==
The name means 'the crossroads near thorn-trees', from thorn and cross.

1508: Thorners

1559: Thornplace

1769: Turn Cross
