= Church Langley =

Part of Harlow, Essex, England

Coordinates: 51.766898°N 0.137344°E

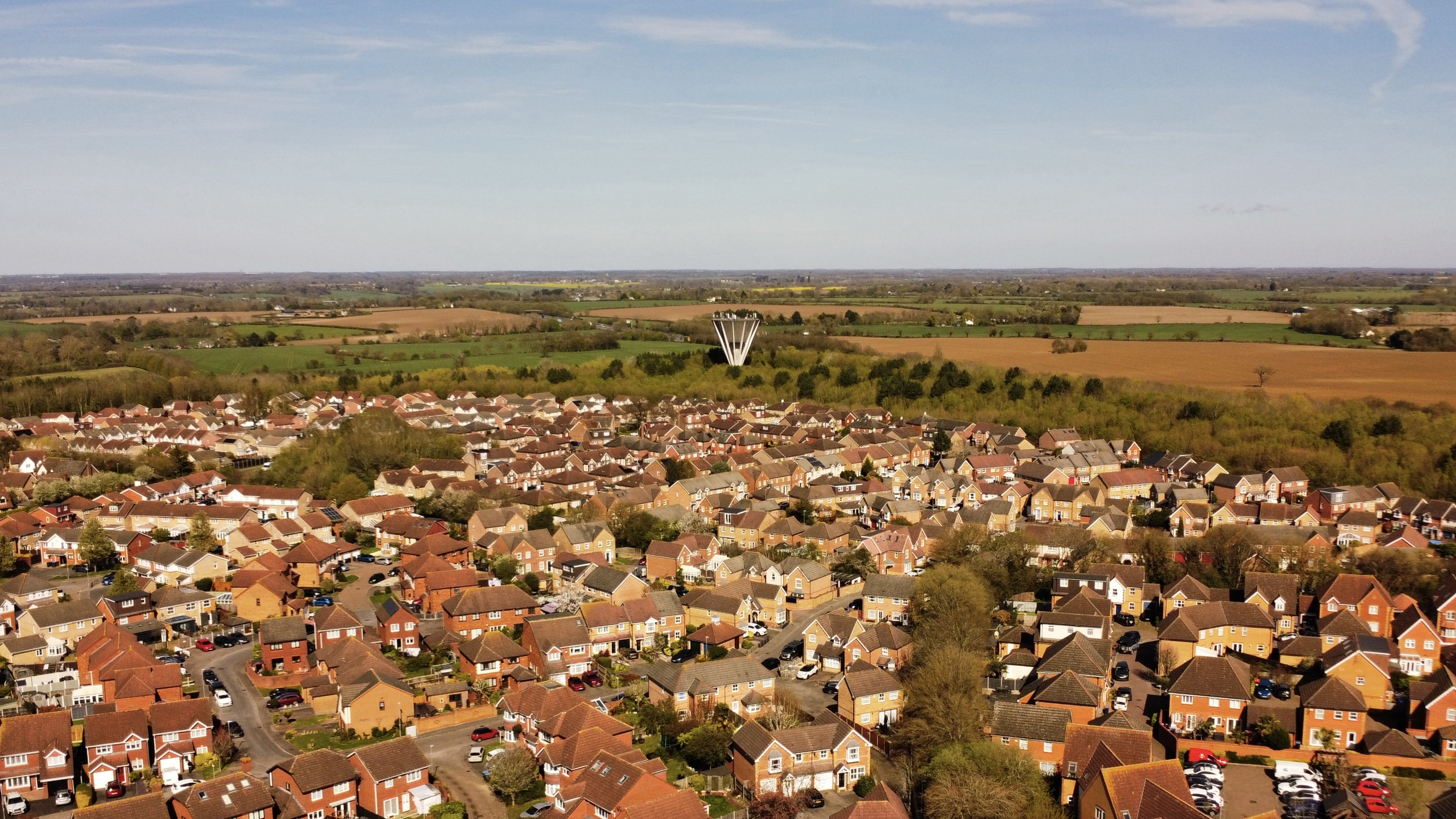
- An aerial photo of Church Langley

- Location within Essex
- OS grid reference: TL481095
- District: Harlow
- Shire county: Essex
- Region: East
- Country: England
- Sovereign state: United Kingdom
- Post town: Harlow
- Postcode district: CM17
- Dialling code: 01279
- Police: Essex
- Fire: Essex
- Ambulance: East of England

Church Langley is a village (largely privately owned) that is on the outskirts of Harlow, Essex, England.

Church Langley is a village that is on the outskirts of Harlow. Building began in 1992 and was originally named Brenthall Park, consisting of three developers in the Brenthall Park partnership who then sold on some parts to other developers. It was built over thirteen years by sixteen different home builders. The area prior to development was within the Epping district, an area cut off from Epping Forest District Council by the M11 and Harlow Common.

Harlow Council granted permission for 3500 luxury homes to be built between the A414 and M11 north of Potter Street on the condition that the developers incorporate community facilities. Church Langley was named after two ancient footpaths. Church Langley was built on farmland owned by local farmers William and Jon Moen and was marketed as a village. They were unhappy with the result, having left the design to the relevant developers, calling it "retro-style architecture" with poor road planning. They resolved to exercise firmer control over the Newhall development, also built on their land using the money raised from the Church Langley development.

A concrete water tower is situated to the east of Church Langley and can be clearly seen from the adjacent M11 motorway. This was built in 1993–1994.

Community facilities in Church Langley include a Tesco store and petrol station (with shoe repair and hand car wash), pharmacy, doctor, dentist, children's development centre, community hall (Church Langley Community Centre), pub (now permanently closed), ecumenical church (Church Langley Church - Church of England, Baptist, URC and Methodist), nursery (Kiddi Caru) and two primary schools (Church Langley Community Primary School and Henry Moore Primary School).
