= Thornwood, Essex =

Hamlet in Essex, England

Coordinates: 51.7253°N 0.126118°E

Thornwood
- Location within Essex
- OS grid reference: TL469050
  - London: 18.7 miles (30.1 km) SSW
- Civil parish: North Weald Bassett
- District: Epping Forest
- Shire county: Essex
- Region: East
- Country: England
- Sovereign state: United Kingdom
- Post town: EPPING
- Postcode district: CM16
- Dialling code: 01992
- Police: Essex
- Fire: Essex
- Ambulance: East of England
- UK Parliament: Epping Forest

Thornwood is a hamlet in the civil parish of North Weald Bassett, in the Epping Forest district of Essex, England. It is on the B1393 road (the former A11), about 1.5 miles (2.4 km) north-east of Epping. The hamlet contains a village hall, a small industrial estate and a trout fishery.
