= List of local nature reserves in Essex =

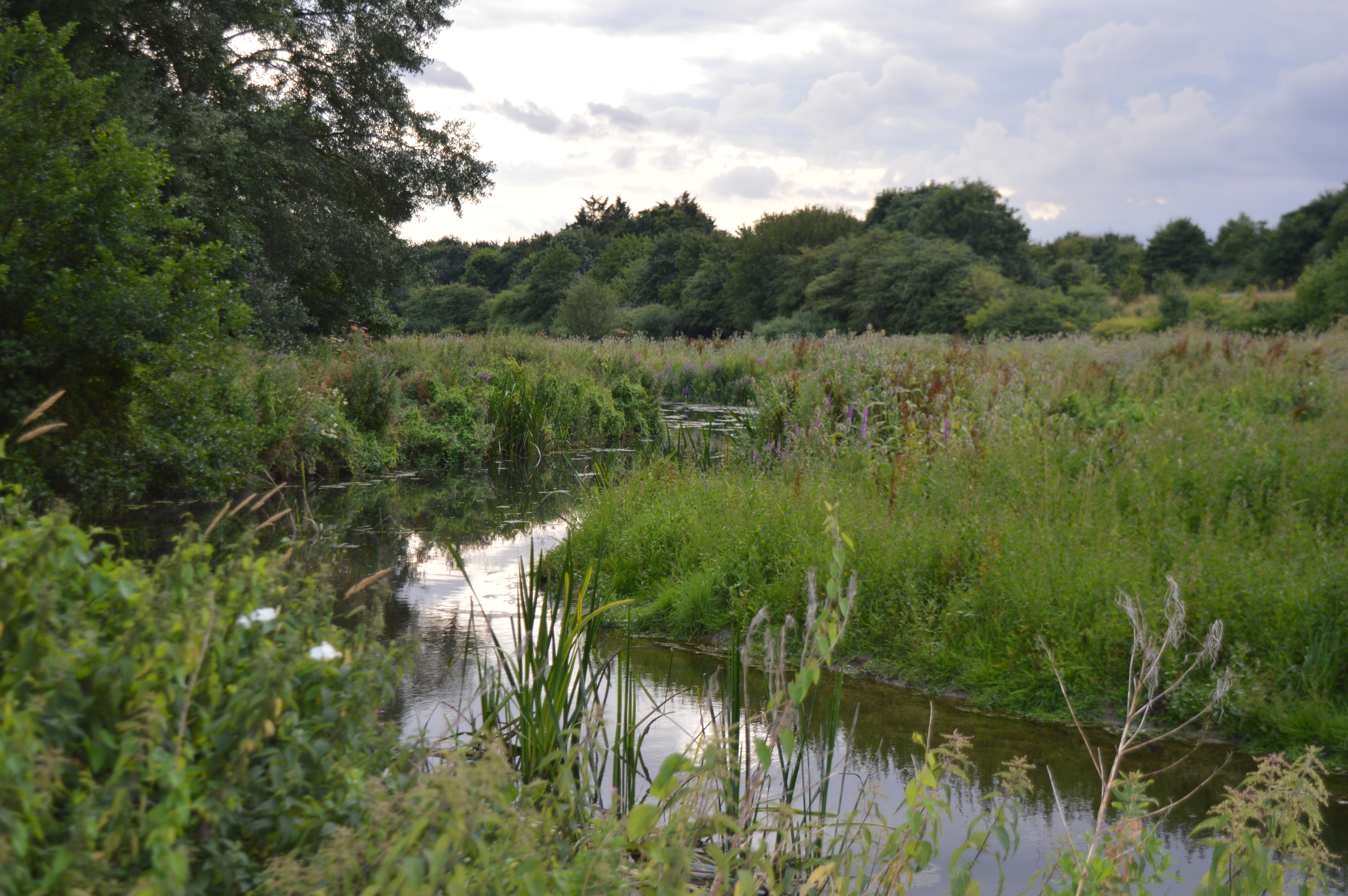
The River Chelmer in Chelmer Valley Riverside

Essex is a county in the east of England. It is bounded by Suffolk and Cambridgeshire to the north, Hertfordshire to the west, Greater London to the south-west, Kent across the River Thames to the south, and the North Sea to the east. It has an area of 1,420 square miles (3,700 km^{2}), with a coastline of 400 miles (640 km), and a population according to the 2011 census of 1,393,600. At the top level of local government are Essex County Council and two unitary authorities, Southend-on-Sea and Thurrock. Under the county council, there are twelve district and borough councils.

Local nature reserves (LNRs) are designated by local authorities under the National Parks and Access to the Countryside Act 1949. The local authority must have legal control over the site, by owning or leasing it or having an agreement with the owner. LNRs are sites which have a special local interest either biologically or geologically, and local authorities have a duty to care for them. They can apply local bye-laws to manage and protect LNRs.

As of August 2016 there are forty-nine local nature reserves in Essex. Nine are also Sites of Special Scientific Interest (SSSI), three are also scheduled monuments and four are managed by the Essex Wildlife Trust. The largest is Southend-on-Sea Foreshore with 1,084 hectares (2,680 acres), which is part of the Benfleet and Southend Marshes SSSI, an internationally important site for migrating birds. The smallest is Nazeing Triangle at 0.5 hectares (1.2 acres), which is a small pond and wildflower meadows surrounded on all three sides by roads.

== Key ==
=== Access ===
- FP = public access only to footpaths through the site
- NO = no public access
- PP = free public access to part of the site
- Yes = free public access to all or most of the site

=== Other classifications ===
- EWT = Essex Wildlife Trust
- Ramsar = Ramsar site
- SPA = Special Protection Area
- SM = Scheduled monument
- SSSI = Site of Special Scientific Interest

== Sites ==
Site	Photograph	Area (Note: The area is taken from the Natural England map of each site. (Click on the identify icon (i) in the "Feature Tools" and then click on the site.))	Location (Note: Unless otherwise stated, the location is taken from the Natural England details page for the site.)	Public access	Other classifications	Map (Note: The maps are on the Natural England database of local nature reserves.)	Details (Note: Details are on the pages on each site in the Natural England database of local nature reserves.)	Description
Belfairs	Belfairs	37.1 hectares (92 acres)	Leigh-on-Sea; 51.5606°N 0.62422°E; TQ820879	Yes	EWT, SSSI	Map	Details	This is a small remnant of the ancient Hadleigh Great Wood. It is coppiced oak woodland on sands, gravels and clay, and one of the largest areas of old woodland in the south of the county. Bramble and honeysuckle are the main ground plants. Other plants include the rare broad-leaved helleborine.
Belton Hills	Belton Hills	22.0 hectares (54 acres)	Leigh-on-Sea; 51.5423°N 0.6390°E; TQ831859	Yes		Map	Details	This steeply sloping site has large areas of scrub, and there are some rare plant and invertebrates species. Plants include Deptford pink and bithynian vetch, and a survey in 2001 recorded 667 invertebrate taxa.
Bocking Blackwater	The River Blackwater in Bocking Blackwater	13.1 hectares (32 acres)	Braintree; 51.8875°N 0.56474°E; TL766241	Yes		Map	Details	The site is a long narrow strip along the south bank of the River Blackwater between Bradford Bridge and the A131 road. It has a wide variety of plant species, including veteran trees, and its habitats are wetland, woodland, scrub, wildflower meadows and grassland.
Brickfield and Long Meadow	Brickfield and Long Meadow	3.9 hectares (9.6 acres)	Earls Colne; 51.9240°N 0.70064°E; TL858285	Yes		Map	Details	The meadow is described by Natural England as "a very important place for plants and insects". It has hundreds of yellow ant anthills, and many species of butterfly. Common plant include yarrow, birdsfoot trefoil, knapweed and ox-eye daisy.
Brockwell Meadows	Brockwell Meadows	4.3 hectares (11 acres)	Kelvedon; 51.8340°N 0.7054°E; TL865185	Yes		Map	Details	This site has water meadow, woodland, a pond and hedgerows. The River Blackwater runs along the eastern boundary.
Bull Meadow	Bull Meadow	1.4 hectares (3.5 acres)	Colchester; 51.8957°N 0.90681°E; TM001259	Yes		Map	Details	The meadow is unimproved damp grassland on the bank of the River Colne, with plants such as purple loosestrife and amphibious bistort. In drier areas there are great willowherb, creeping thistle and stinging nettles. There are many species of butterflies and spiders, and birds include warblers.
Canvey Lake	Canvey Lake	8.3 hectares (21 acres)	Canvey Island; 51.5273°N 0.58542°E; TQ794841	Yes		Map	Details	This was formerly a creek which has been converted to a lake by the building of a sea wall. Wildlife includes mallards, moorhens and water voles. A shingle bank has been created and reed beds cut back.
Chelmer Valley Riverside	Chelmer Valley Riverside	17.6 hectares (43 acres)	Chelmsford; 51.7419°N 0.47536°E; TL710077	Yes		Map	Details	The LNR stretches along the River Chelmer and its banks. The northern end has the river, unimproved grassland, veteran hedges, scrub and woodland. The southern area is more managed, with mown grass as well as large trees and an area of marshland.
Chigwell Row Wood	Chigwell Row Wood	14.1 hectares (35 acres)	Chigwell; 51.6169°N 0.10741°E; TQ460930	Yes		Map	Details	The wood is a remnant of the ancient Hainault Forest, and its history can be traced back to the seventeenth century. The trees were traditionally pollarded for fuel, and 366 pollards over 250 years old have been recorded, out of which 75% are hornbeam and 20% oak. There are over 800 species of invertebrates.
Church Lane Flood Meadow	Church Lane Flood Meadow	3.3 hectares (8.2 acres)	North Weald Bassett; 51.7211°N 0.16148°E; TL494047	FP		Map	Details	The site was designed to relieve flooding in the parish, and it is managed for wildlife. A pond and wet grassland have been created, and over 2,500 native deciduous trees have been planted. Plants include ragged robin and marsh cinquefoil, and 16 butterfly and moth species have been recorded, together with 10 dragonflies and 60 birds.
Colne	Colne	34.7 hectares (86 acres)	Wivenhoe; 51.8684°N 0.95445°E; TM035230	Yes		Map	Details	There are several different habitats, including Wivenhoe Marsh, which is adjacent to the River Colne, Wivenhoe Woods, which have sixteen tree species with sweet chestnut dominant, and Lower Lodge, scrub and grassland which has a row of mature oak trees on its eastern boundary.
Colne Valley	Colne Valley	5.1 hectares (13 acres)	Earls Colne; 51.9319°N 0.70984°E; TL864294	Yes		Map	Details	This linear strip along the route of the former Colne Valley and Halstead Railway has been converted to wildflower meadows. There are otters, bats, stag beetles and birds.
Cuckoo Wood	Cuckoo Wood	2.5 hectares (6.2 acres)	Braintree; 51.8615°N 0.51969°E; TL736211	NO		Map	Details	The site has amenity grassland, meadows, woods, lakes, ponds, ditches and hedgerows. It has some locally rare species, and is described by Natural England as a very good habitat for fungi, due to a large amount of dead wood.
Fenn Washland	Fenn Washland	4.9 hectares (12 acres)	South Woodham Ferrers; 51.6374°N 0.60842°E; TQ806964	Yes		Map	Details	This is undeveloped wetland in a valley surrounded by housing. It has grassland, swamp, scrub, ponds and reedbed, providing diverse habitats for wildlife.
Galleywood Common	Galleywood Common	44.6 hectares (110 acres)	Chelmsford; 51.6927°N 0.46255°E; TL703022	Yes		Map	Details	Galleywood Common was recorded in the Domesday Book. Its diverse habitats include heathland, woodland, scrub, grassland, ponds and mire. It has a wide variety of fauna.
Gosfield Sandpits	Gosfield Sandpits	8.3 hectares (21 acres)	Braintree; 51.9353°N 0.59657°E; TL786295	Yes		Map	Details	The site is an area of former sandpits which has around a mile of footpaths, woodland, an open glade and many ponds. There is a wide variety of trees, and flowers include wood anemones and bluebells. It is described by Natural England as "an area of outstanding natural beauty".
Grove House Wood	Grove House Wood	2.2 hectares (5.4 acres)	Stanford-le-Hope; 51.5106°N 0.427633°E; TQ685818	Yes		Map	Details	The wood has dead elms which provide nesting sites for woodpeckers. Other habitats are a pond, a brook and reedbeds.
Harlow Marsh	Parndon Moat Marsh	13.8 hectares (34 acres)	Harlow; 51.7851°N 0.10509°E; TL453117	Yes	SM	Map	Details	This site is in three separate areas. Parndon Moat Marsh has a moat which is a Scheduled Monument, wildflower meadows and woodland. Maymeads Marsh has wildflower meadows and a reed-filled pond with a bird hide, and Marshgate Spring has marshes with reed and sedge beds.
Hawkenbury Meadow	Hawkenbury Meadow	1.6 hectares (4.0 acres)	Harlow; 51.7595°N 0.076369°E; TL434088	Yes		Map	Details	The meadow is neutral grassland with a brook running through it. It has a variety of wild flowers including yellow rattle, common spotted orchid, cowslip, wild carrot and grass vetchling. There are strips of mature woodland along the margins, and a stand of willow trees. A damper area in the north of the site has marshland plants.
Hilly Fields	Hilly Fields	37.5 hectares (93 acres)	Colchester; 51.8926°N 0.88626°E; TL987255	Yes	SM	Map	Details	The fields have diverse habitats of grassland, woods, hedges, scrub, ponds and marsh. The grassland is grazed by rabbits, and invertebrates include minotaur beetles and bee wolf wasps. The woodland is mainly oak, ash and hawthorn, and the pond banks have reedmace and reed sweet-grass.
Hockley Woods	Hockley Woods	91.5 hectares (226 acres)	Hockley; 51.5952°N 0.64498°E; TQ833918	Yes	SSSI	Map	Details	The woods are on pre-glacial gravels and clay, with trees including hornbeam, pedunculate oak, sessile oak, birch and hazel. Ground flora include three species of orchid, and there is a stream and area of bog.
Holland Haven	Holland Haven	22.1 hectares (55 acres)	Clacton-on-Sea; 51.8120°N 1.2192°E; TM220175	Yes	SSSI	Map	Details	This is a country park which has ponds, a scrape area, grassland, marsh and hawthorn scrub. Over 200 bird species have been recorded, including purple sandpipers, avocets and short-eared owls. There is a bird hide, car parking and toilets.
Home Mead	Home Mead	1.8 hectares (4.4 acres)	Loughton; 51.66057°N 0.079071°E; TQ439978	Yes		Map	Details	This site has woodland, scrub and acid grassland. A wildflower meadow has yellow tormentil and blue bugle, both of which provide food for butterflies. Plants in the scrub area include bird's-foot trefoil and ragged robin.
Hoppit Mead	Hoppit Mead	9.2 hectares (23 acres)	Braintree; 51.8703°N 0.54416°E; TL752221	Yes		Map	Details	This linear site has formal park areas, wildflower meadows, scrub, wet woodland and coppice. The River Brain runs through it. The seventeenth century naturalist John Ray made pioneering observations of wild blackcurrant bushes in the wet woodland.
Hutton Country Park	Hutton Country Park	37.4 hectares (92 acres)	Brentwood; 51.6372°N 0.36271°E; TQ636958	Yes		Map	Details	Most of the park is semi-natural grassland which has a diverse range of species. There are also areas of oak and hornbeam woodland, ponds and wetlands. There are birds such as moorhens and long-tailed tits, insects including large red damselflies and orange tip butterflies, and flowers such as the lesser stitchwort and ox-eye daisy.
Kendal Park	Kendal Park	2.8 hectares (6.9 acres)	Hullbridge; 51.62836°N 0.61079°E; TQ808954	Yes		Map	Details	The park has a wildlflower meadow, coppiced woodland, grassland and a pond. Flowers in the meadow include hoary cress, charlock and ox-eye daisy, and there are many species of butterflies. The woodland has birds such as dunnock and song thrushes.
Lexden Park	Lexden Park	8.1 hectares (20 acres)	Colchester; 51.8887°N 0.86421°E; TL972250	PP		Map	Details	The site has grassland with a wide variety of plant species such as lady's bedstraw, lesser stitchwort and greater bird's-foot-trefoil. There is also oak woodland and an ornamental lake with wildfowl.
Linder's Field	Linder's Field	3.9 hectares (9.6 acres)	Buckhurst Hill; 51.6311°N 0.043921°E; TQ415944	Yes		Map	Details	There is ancient woodland, scrub, grassland and ponds. The ponds have frogs, toads and newts, and bats forage in the hedgerows. Plants include bluebells and wood anemone. It also has a wildflower meadow which is an important habitat for many species of invertebrates, birds and mammals.
Linford Wood	Linford Wood	3.5 hectares (8.6 acres)	East Tilbury; 51.4905°N 0.412738°E; TQ676796	Yes		Map	Details	The site has mixed woodland, a willow plantation, hedges, ditches and an open area. Birds include tawny owls, great spotted woodpeckers and green woodpeckers. It is part of the proposed extended Thurrock Thameside Nature Park.
Magnolia Fields	Magnolia Fields	9.7 hectares (24 acres)	Rochford; 51.5989°N 0.68601°E; TQ861923	Yes		Map	Details	This is a former brickworks and evidence of its former activity is still visible, including a pond. There is a wide variety of birds, including bullfinches.
Marylands	Marylands	3.7 hectares (9.1 acres)	Hockley; 51.6085°N 0.65442°E; TQ839933	Yes		Map	Details	Marylands has a varied fauna and flora, with 96 species of trees, shrubs, grasses and herbs, and 13 of butterflies. Nine of the tree species are associated with ancient woodland. There are woodland and farmland birds, and a stream with sticklebacks.
Mill Meadows, Billericay	Mill Meadows	36.8 hectares (91 acres)	Billericay; 51.6198°N 0.42392°E; TQ679940	Yes	SSSI	Map	Details	This site has grassland, scrub and woodland, with mammals including badgers, stoats and foxes, and many bird species. Some areas are wet, and the main grasses are red fescue and common bent. Flowers include harebell and common spotted orchid.
Nazeing Triangle	Nazeing Triangle	0.5 hectares (1.2 acres)	Harlow; 51.7398°N 0.046925°E; TL414065	Yes		Map	Details	This very small site, which surrounded on all three sides by roads, is mainly occupied by a pond, which has great crested and smooth newts, together with waterfowl and dragonflies. It has an area of wildflower meadow with ox-eye daisy, bird's foot trefoil and self heal. The site is bordered by a hawthorn hedge.
Norsey Wood	Norsey Wood	65.6 hectares (162 acres)	Billericay; 51.6321°N 0.43614°E; TQ687954	Yes	SM, SSSI	Map	Details	This is ancient oak woodland on acid soil which has been converted to mixed sweet chestnut coppice. There are sphagnum mosses in acidic flushes, and the rare water violet in one of the four ponds. There are nine species of dragonfly. Archaeological features include a Bronze Age bowl barrow.
Parndon Woods and Common	Parndon Wood Conservation Centre	50.5 hectares (125 acres)	Harlow; 51.7413°N 0.091465°E; TL445068	Yes	SSSI	Map	Details	The woods are mainly pedunculate oak and hornbeam, and other trees include ash, hazel and birch. There are also some elms which are regenerating from coppice following Dutch elm disease.
Pickers Ditch Meadow	Pickers Ditch Meadow	1.9 hectares (4.7 acres)	Clacton-on-Sea; 51.8102°N 1.15897°E; TM178171	Yes		Map	Details	This is a linear site along the bank of Pickers Ditch, a tributary of Holland Brook. A footpath runs through the grassland, and hedges have been planted along the boundaries to screen the site.
Roding Valley Meadows	River Roding in Roding Valley Meadows	65.2 hectares (161 acres)	Buckhurst Hill; 51.6284°N 0.0645979°E; TQ430942	Yes	EWT, SSSI	Map	Details	The meadows are bordered to the south west by the River Roding. They form one of the largest areas of grassland in Essex which are traditionally managed as hay meadows, flood meadows and marshland. Plants include the largest beds in Essex of the rare brown sedge.
Roughtalley's Wood	Roughtalley's Wood	3.4 hectares (8.4 acres)	North Weald Bassett; 51.7114°N 0.153778°E; TL489036	Yes		Map	Details	Part of this site is ancient woodland of hornbeam, oak and silver birch, with an understorey which is mainly hazel and hawthorn. The other part is younger woodland which has wildflower glades with bee and common spotted orchids, slowworms and grass snakes.
Salary Brook	Salary Brook	17.1 hectares (42 acres)	Colchester; 51.8858°N 0.94396°E; TM027249	Yes		Map	Details	The site has a variety of habitats, with the brook itself, pasture, ponds and marsh. Fauna include four species of bats, water voles, lizards, nightingales and reed warblers. An area called Berrimans Pasture has over one hundred plants, particularly ones typical of unimproved damp grasslands.
Shoeburyness Old Ranges	Shoeburyness Old Ranges	6.4 hectares (16 acres)	Shoeburyness; 51.523°N 0.780°E; TQ929840	NO	EWT, SSSI	Map	Details	The Old Ranges have flora unique in the county, on a habitat of unimproved grassland over ancient sand dunes. There are areas of grasses and sedges, while rushes are found in damp hollows. Rabbits graze the grassland, and close cropped areas have many lichens. (Note: The description of Shoeburyness Old Ranges is from the Foulness SSSI citation, where it is called Gunners Park.)
Southend-on-Sea Foreshore	Southend-on-Sea Foreshore	1,083.9 hectares (2,678 acres)	Southend-on-Sea; 51.5199°N 0.75306°E; TQ911837	Yes	Ramsar, SPA, SSSI	Map	Details	The 8.5 miles (13.7 km) long stretch of coast is internationally important for migrating birds. Bar-tailed godwits nest on the salt marshes, and other birds include dunlins, teals, ringed plovers, grey plovers and turnstones.
Spring Lane Meadows	Spring Lane Meadows	2.0 hectares (4.9 acres)	Colchester; 51.8914°N 0.86438°E; TL972253	PP		Map	Details	The wildlflower meadows are grazed by cattle. Birds include kingfishers, snipe and nightingales, and there are mammals such as otters and noctule bats.
Thornwood Common Flood Meadow	Thornwood Common Flood Meadow	3.0 hectares (7.4 acres)	North Weald Bassett; 51.7199°N 0.12812°E; TL471045	Yes		Map	Details	The flood meadow was created to alleviate flooding in Thornwood village, and it is managed for nature conservation. A wetland meadow, 800 trees and a 200 metres (220 yd) hedge have been created. Flowers include ragged robin, oxeye daisy and knapweed.
Tiptree Parish Field	Tiptree Parish Field	2.2 hectares (5.4 acres)	Tiptree; 51.8133°N 0.75331°E; TL898163	Yes		Map	Details	The field has acid rough grassland with young oak woodland, and a pond which was created by widening Layer Brook.
Vange Hill	Vange Hill	11.5 hectares (28 acres)	Basildon; 51.5611°N 0.479956°E; TQ720876	Yes		Map	Details	The hill has grassland and scrub woodland, surrounded by a drainage ditch. Some meadow areas are closely mown, but others are only cut annually, allowing flowers to grow provide food for bumblebees and butterflies. There are unusual plants such as pale flax.
Weald Common Flood Meadows	Weald Common Flood Meadows	1.9 hectares (4.7 acres)	North Weald Bassett; 51.7138°N 0.16837°E; TL499039	PP		Map	Details	The site consists of two meadows created for flood defence, and managed for biodiversity with the creation of a wet meadow, which is dominated by flowers such as cowslips and ragged robin. Newts and frogs breed in ponds and ditches, and grass snakes and common lizard bask on sunny days.
Welsh Wood	Welsh Wood	3.2 hectares (7.9 acres)	Colchester; 51.8983°N 0.9438°E; TM026262	Yes		Map	Details	Trees in this site, which is managed by rotational coppicing, include ash, hazel, sweet chestnut and the rare small leaved lime. It is carpeted by bluebells in the spring, and there are other flowers such as yellow archangel and wood anemone. Dead wood provides a habitat for stag beetle larvae.
Whet Mead	Whet Mead	10.1 hectares (25 acres)	Witham; 51.7929°N 0.652189°E; TL830138	Yes		Map	Details	Most of this former rubbish tip is grassland with many different flowering plants, and a range of butterflies, dragonflies and seed-eating birds. Mammals include wood mice, bank voles and pygmy shrews. There is also scrub and young woodland.
Wrabness	Wrabness	27.0 hectares (67 acres)	Wrabness; 51.9409°N 1.14257°E; TM161316	Yes	EWT	Map	Details	This site has grassland, marsh, scrub and woodland. It has a diverse bird life, such as yellowhammers, whitethroats, song thrushes and short-eared owls. There are also winter visitors including black-tailed godwits, grey plovers and turnstones.

== See also ==
- List of Sites of Special Scientific Interest in Essex
- Essex Wildlife Trust
