= Chelmsford Racecourse =

Former horse racing venue in Galleywood, Essex, England

Chelmsford Racecourse was a horse racing venue in Galleywood, near Chelmsford, in Essex, England. The course was active from at least 1759 until its final closure in April 1935.

== History ==
The course initially staged Flat racing before switching to National Hunt racing in 1892. Amongst the horses who raced at the course was the Cheltenham Gold Cup winner, Golden Miller, who won two hurdle races at Chelmsford in 1931.

The course was described as being right-handed, about two miles long with a run-in of six furlongs. The course enclosed a windmill, a brickworks and the church of St Michael and All Angels. It crossed a main road twice and a by-road, and the roads were closed to traffic when race meetings were held.

== The site today ==
Parts of the course have been preserved and can still be seen on Galleywood Common, beside the B1007 road.
