= Brickfield (disambiguation) =

A brickfield is an open site where bricks are made. Place names are often formed from the word.

Brickfield, Brickfields, or Brickfielder may also refer to:

== Australia ==
- Brickfielder, an arid wind
- Brickfield Hill, an area of Sydney
- Brickfields Hiring Depot, a historic building in North Hobart, Tasmania

== United Kingdom ==
=== England ===
- The Brickfields, a stadium in Devon
- Brickfields, Bletchley, an area in Buckinghamshire
- Brickfields, Worcestershire, an English location
- Brickfield and Long Meadow, a reserve in Essex
- Brickfields Meadow, Croydon, London
- Brickfields Country Park, Hampshire

=== Wales ===
- Brickfields Pond, a Welsh lake and reserve in Rhyl, Denbighshire
- Brickfield Rangers F.C., a football club in Wrexham

== Elsewhere ==
- Brick Field, a stadium in Edmonton, Canada
- Brickfields, Kuala Lumpur, a Malaysian neighbourhood
- Brickfield Town, Dublin, Ireland (now Sandymount)
- Soweto, South Africa (formerly Brickfields)
- Brickfield, a beach in Couva, Trinidad and Tobago

== See also ==
- Brickworks, a factory for manufacturing bricks
- Brickyard, a place where bricks are made
