= Motor Insurers' Bureau =

British company that compensates victims of uninsured drivers

- Type: Private
- Industry: Motor insurance
- Founded: 1946
- Headquarters: Linford Wood House, Stantonbury, England, UK
- Key people: Angus Eaton, Chief Executive
- Products: Compensation
- Number of employees: 320 (2009)
- Website: MIB

The Motor Insurers' Bureau (MIB) was founded in the UK in 1946 as a private company limited by guarantee and is the mechanism in the UK through which compensation is provided for victims of accidents caused by uninsured and untraced drivers, which is funded by an estimated £30 a year from every insured driver's premiums.

== Role and history ==
Its role was and is to enter into agreements with the Government as to how compensation claims from people who have been involved in accidents which were caused by uninsured or untraced drivers may be compensated. Section 95 of the Road Traffic Act 1988 requires every insurer dealing with compulsory motor insurance to belong to the MIB and to contribute to its funding.

According to the MIB's website's FAQ section, the cost of funding the MIB is ultimately borne by law-abiding motorists who pay their insurance premiums.

The offices are near the junction of the A422 (Monks Way) and B4034 (Marlborough Street) in Linford Wood, Milton Keynes. The current CEO is Angus Eaton, who was appointed in 2024.

== MIB schemes ==
The MIB run three types of schemes that help the victims of negligent drivers named "The uninsured drivers scheme", "The untraced driver’s scheme" and "The green card scheme".

=== The Uninsured Drivers Scheme ===
This scheme deals with compensation claims arising out of accidents caused or contributed to by an uninsured driver. Where it is shown that no policy of insurance exists covering the responsible party’s vehicle, the MIB will consider dealing with a claim for compensation from the "victim". Liability still needs to be assessed but because the negligent (and uninsured) party has been formally identified, the MIB recognise that the innocent victim has rights of full legal redress once fault is proven. This assumes that the MIBs own claims criteria are met.

Claims will be considered for the cost of repairing/replacing the vehicle (comprehensively insured policyholders precluded), hire charges, loss of use and property damage. An injured party can also claim for treatment and/or rehabilitation for pain and suffering. Legal costs are paid in full by the MIB once the claim is proven.

=== The Untraced Drivers Agreement (hit and run) scheme ===
This scheme applies to the victims of hit and run driver accidents. Where the driver deemed to be responsible for an accident, leaves the scene and is not traced, the MIB will consider a claim for compensation in respect of both property and personal injury damages. There are a number of restrictions imposed with this scheme not least the fact that one cannot recover legal fees in full.

=== The Green Card Scheme ===
This scheme involves accidents caused by the negligent driving of foreign motorists. The MIB will under certain circumstances agree to step in and deal with claims from innocent victims of such accidents, rather than force the injured victim to seek compensation from a potentially uncommunicative foreign insurer. The concept of this scheme was introduced to the UK as a result of European Union (EU) legislation. The MIB is a member of the international Council of Bureaux

== Scams ==
The MIB has issued a warning about scammers who spoof the MIB's telephone number and make cold calls encouraging people to make false insurance claims. This scam has been known about since at least August 2013.

== See also ==
- Association of British Insurers
