= Holland-on-Sea =

Suburb of Clacton-on-Sea, Essex, England

Coordinates: 51°48′20″N 1°11′47″E

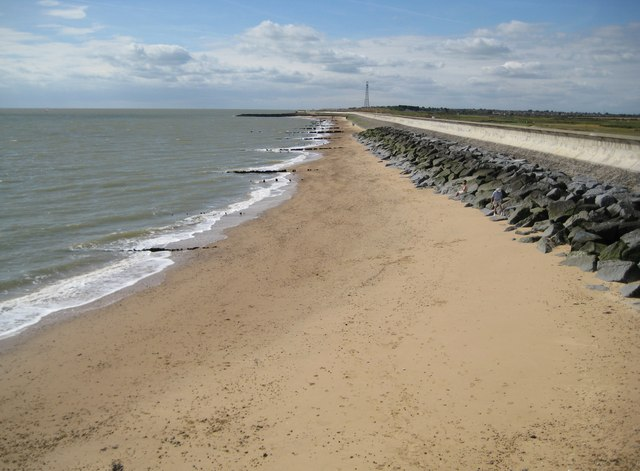
- Holland on Sea, Sea front

- Location within Essex
- District: Tendring
- Shire county: Essex
- Region: East
- Country: England
- Sovereign state: United Kingdom
- Post town: CLACTON-ON-SEA
- Postcode district: CO15
- Dialling code: 01255
- Police: Essex
- Fire: Essex
- Ambulance: East of England

Holland-on-Sea is a suburb of Clacton-on-Sea, in the Tendring district of Essex, England. It is on the coast to the north-east of the centre of Clacton, and lies to the south of the village of Great Holland.

Holland-on-Sea has a public library, four churches, several shops, a village hall, a primary school, one main hotel and a number of guest houses and pubs. It has beaches with facilities for bathing and boating. There are two Sites of Special Scientific Interest, Holland Haven Marshes, part of which is Holland Haven Country Park, and Holland-on-Sea Cliff.

== History ==
Holland-on-Sea was historically called Little Holland, and it was a small village and ancient parish in the Tendring hundred of Essex. Archaeological evidence shows the village existed by Saxon times and comprised a manorial complex of a church and manor house adjoining a small village. The manor house is called Little Holland Hall; the current building dates back to at least the 16th century.

By the 17th century, the eastern parts of the village had been lost to coastal erosion, leaving a very small village around the surviving church and hall. By 1650 the parish was too small to support its own church, and so the parish was united for ecclesiastical purposes with the neighbouring parish of Great Clacton. By 1660 Little Holland church had been demolished.

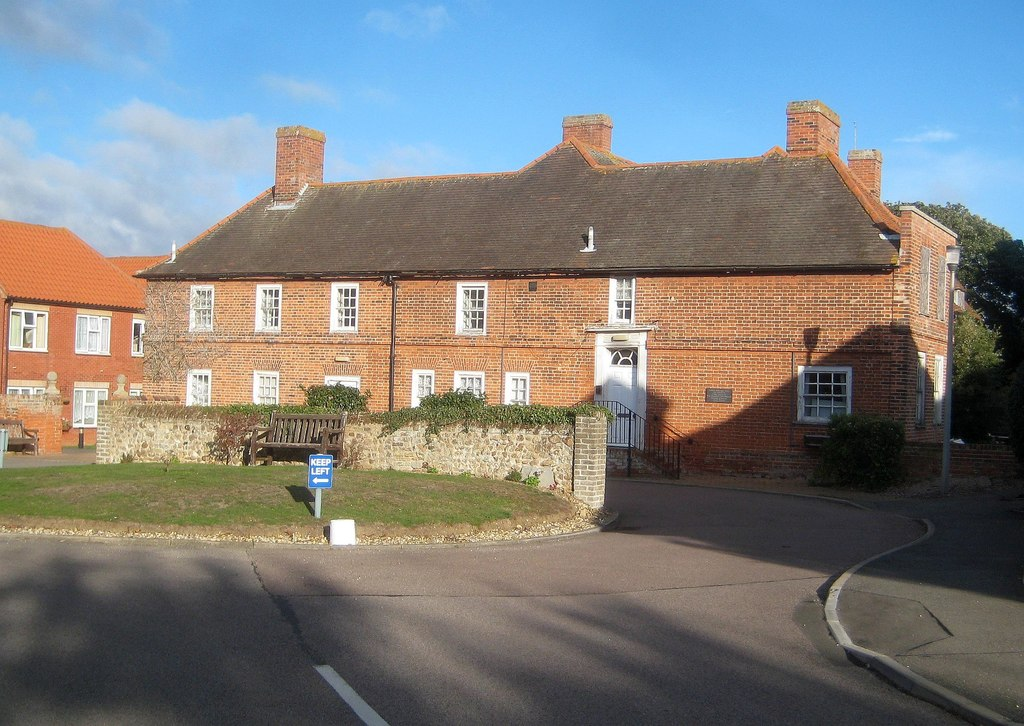
Little Holland Hall

In the early 1870s, Little Holland was described as having 17 houses and a population of 88. A sea wall to limit further coastal erosion was subsequently built. In the early 20th century much of the land was sold for development, and the name Holland-on-Sea gradually came to be used for the growing area instead of Little Holland.

Although Little Holland had lost its original parish church in the 1650s, it continued to constitute a parish for civil purposes, such as administering the poor laws. When elected parish and district councils were created under the Local Government Act 1894, Little Holland was included in the Tendring Rural District. The parish of Little Holland was abolished in 1934, when its area was absorbed into Clacton Urban District. Since 1934, Holland-on-Sea has therefore been administered as part of Clacton. At the 1931 census (the last before the abolition of the civil parish), Little Holland had a population of 780.

During the Second World War Holland-on-Sea was fortified against German attack. There is a Martello tower in nearby Clacton, which was also used during the Second World War. There is a Second World War pill box in Holland Haven Country Park. After the Second World War Holland-on-Sea went back to being a holiday town.

== Sport ==
Holland-on-Sea is the home of the Gunfleet Sailing Club, based near the junction of Marine Parade and Hazelmere Road. The Gunfleet Sailing Club was named after the Gunfleet Sands, a sand bank situated approximately 7 miles from the coast of Walton on the Naze stretching towards Clacton, the site of the abandoned Gunfleet Lighthouse and Gunfleet Sands Offshore Wind Farm.

Also located along Holland Haven is The Gunfleet Boating Club. This club caters for small Boat Fisherman, Skiers, Jet Ski users and Kayak/Canoe users. The club boasts full launch facilities, Showers, Bar and social area. The club has been established for over 30 years as a members only club run by an elected committee. Members who benefit from the club not only come from the immediate area but far afield as London and throughout East Anglia. Holland Haven has excellent beaches which were upgraded between 2014 and 2015.

Holland-on-Sea has a football club called Holland F.C. and also is home to Clacton Cricket Club.

== Climate ==
In East Anglia, the warmest time of the year is July and August, when maximum temperatures average around 21 °C (70 °F). The coolest time of the year is January and February, when minimum temperatures average around 1 °C (34 °F)

East Anglia's average annual rainfall is about 605 millimetres (23¾"), with October to January being the wettest months.

Climate data for East Anglia (1971–2000 averages)
Month	Jan	Feb	Mar	Apr	May	Jun	Jul	Aug	Sep	Oct	Nov	Dec	Year
Mean daily maximum °F (°C)	44.1 (6.7)	44.8 (7.1)	49.8 (9.9)	54.1 (12.3)	61.0 (16.1)	66.2 (19.0)	71.2 (21.8)	71.4 (21.9)	65.5 (18.6)	57.9 (14.4)	49.6 (9.8)	45.7 (7.6)	56.8 (13.8)
Mean daily minimum °F (°C)	34.0 (1.1)	33.6 (0.9)	36.7 (2.6)	39.0 (3.9)	44.1 (6.7)	49.3 (9.6)	53.2 (11.8)	53.2 (11.8)	49.8 (9.9)	44.6 (7.0)	38.5 (3.6)	35.8 (2.1)	42.8 (6.0)
Average rainfall inches (mm)	2.10 (53.4)	1.46 (37.2)	1.76 (44.8)	1.78 (45.3)	1.76 (44.8)	2.14 (54.3)	1.81 (46.0)	1.97 (50.1)	2.19 (55.6)	2.32 (59.0)	2.30 (58.5)	2.24 (56.8)	23.85 (605.8)
Source: East Anglia 1971–2000 averages

== Notable residents ==
The singer Sade lived in the town with her family between the ages of 11 and 18.

The history professor, W. David McIntyre lived in the town during a sabbatical from the University of Canterbury with his wife and children in the early 1970s.
