= Home Mead =

Nature reserve in Loughton, Essex, UK

Coordinates: 51.6606°N 0.0791°E

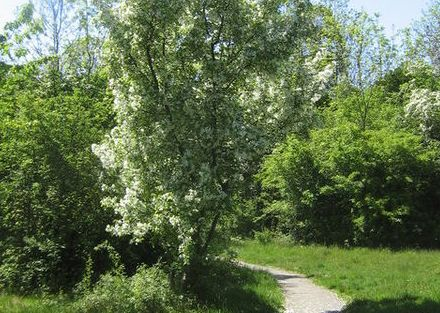
- Interactive map of Home Mead
- Type: Local Nature Reserve
- Location: Loughton, Essex
- OS grid: TQ 439 978
- Area: 1.8 hectares (4.4 acres)
- Manager: Epping Forest District Council

Home Mead is a 1.8 hectare Local Nature Reserve in Loughton in Essex. It is owned and managed by Epping Forest District Council.

This site has woodland, scrub and acid grassland. The woodland has spread into part of the grassland. A wildflower meadow has yellow tormentil and blue bugle, both of which provide food for butterflies. Plants is the scrub area include bird's-foot trefoil and ragged robin.

There is access from England's Lane.
