= Belton Hills =

Nature reserve in Essex, England

Coordinates: 51.5423°N 0.639°E

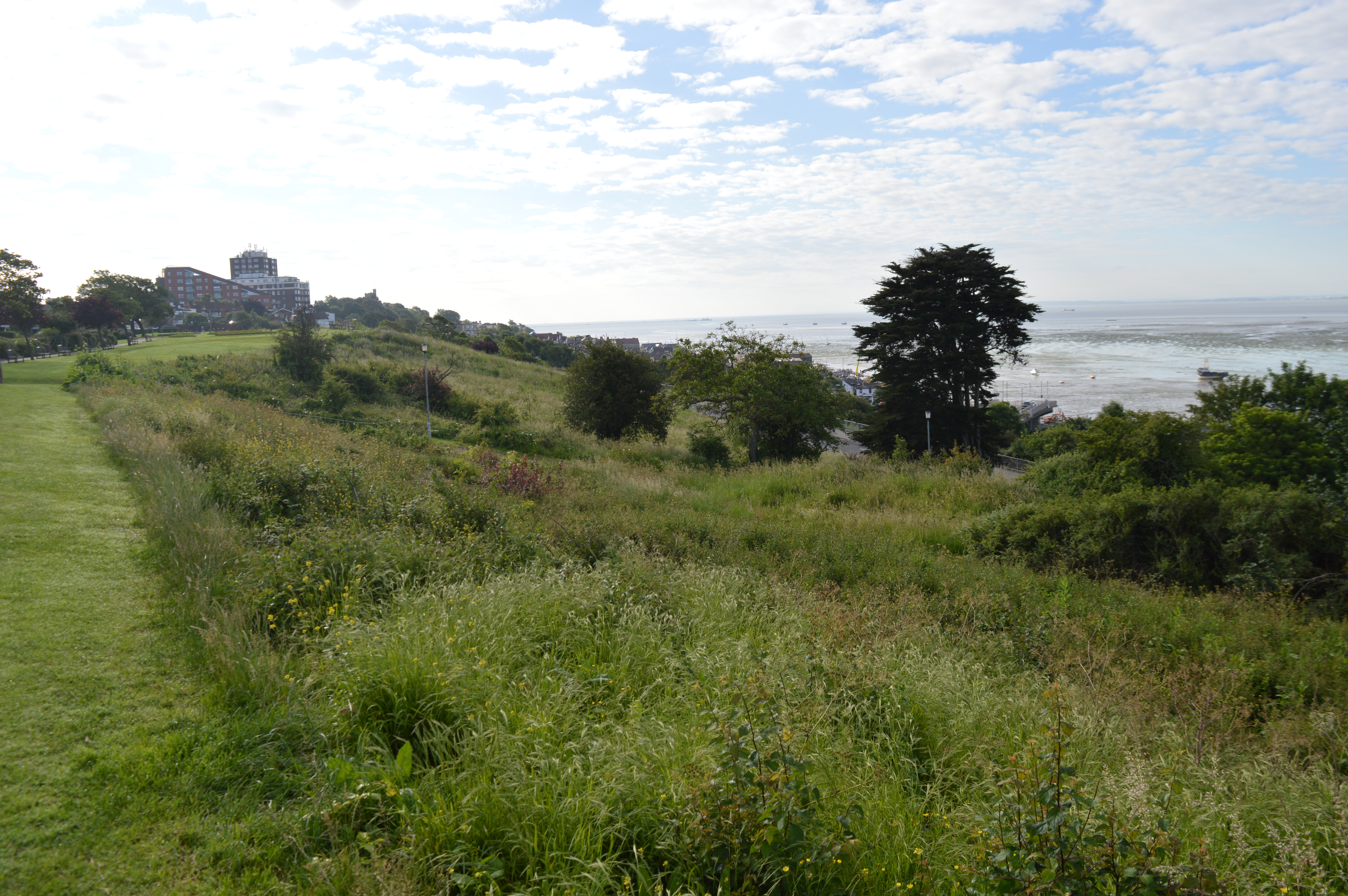
- Interactive map of Belton Hills
- Type: Local Nature Reserve
- Location: Leigh-on-Sea, Essex
- OS grid: TQ831859
- Area: 22.0 hectares (54 acres)
- Manager: Southend-on-Sea Borough Council

Belton Hills is a 22 hectare Local Nature Reserve in Leigh-on-Sea in Essex. It is owned and managed by Southend-on-Sea City Council.

This steeply sloping site has large areas of scrub, and there are some rare plant and invertebrates species. Plants include Deptford pink (flowering June-August) and bithynian vetch (flowering May–June), and a survey in 2001 recorded 667 invertebrate taxa.

There is access to the site from Marine Parade and Belton Way.
