= Hoppit Mead =

Nature reserve in Braintree, Essex, England

Coordinates: 51.8703°N 0.54416°E

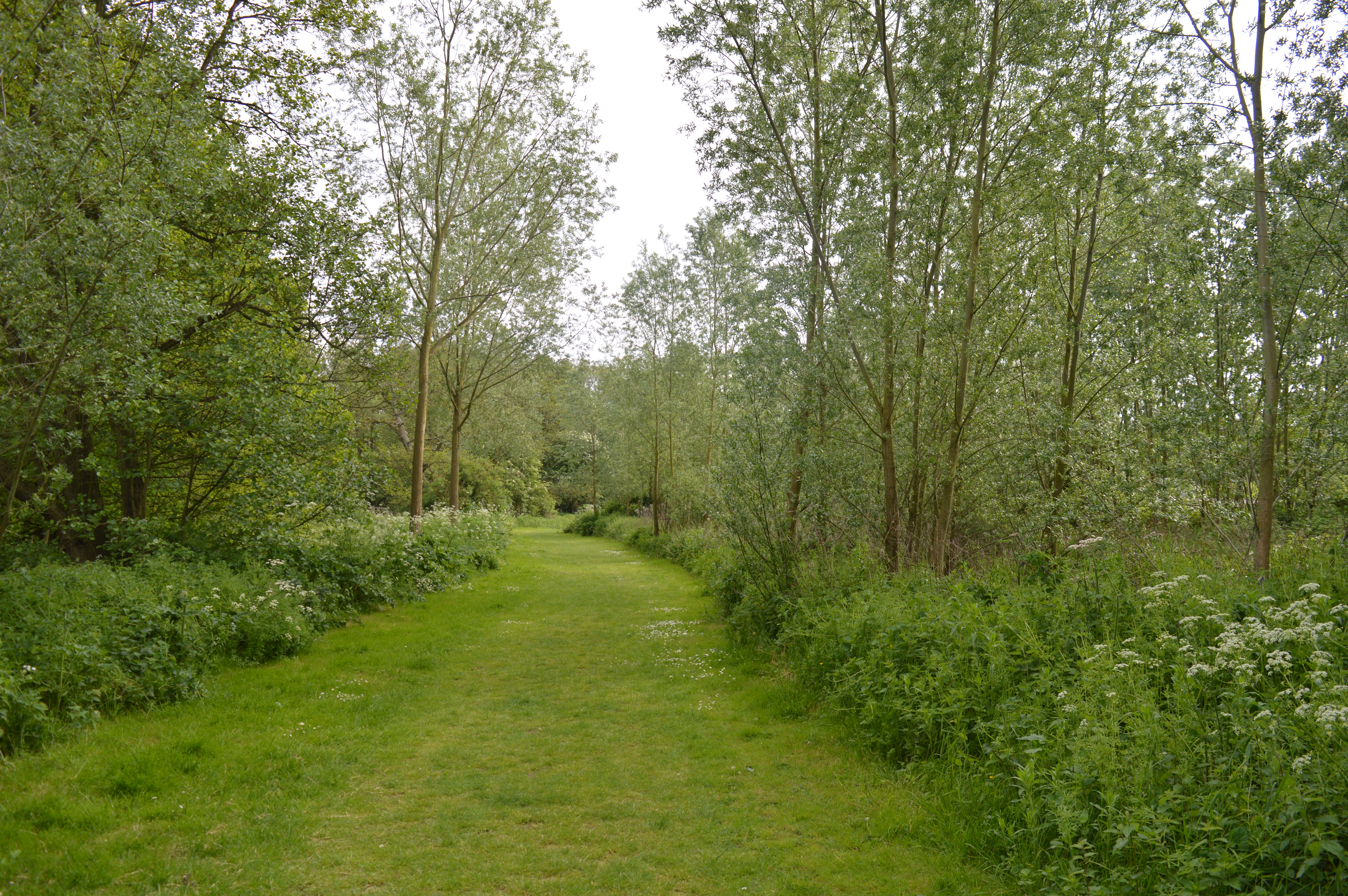
- Interactive map of Hoppit Mead
- Type: Local Nature Reserve
- Location: Braintree, Essex
- OS grid: TL752221
- Area: 9.2 hectares (23 acres)
- Manager: Braintree District Council

Hoppit Mead is a 9.2 hectare Local Nature Reserve in Braintree in Essex. It is owned and managed by Braintree District Council.

This linear site has formal park areas, wildflower meadows, scrub, wet woodland and coppice. The River Brain runs through it. The seventeenth century naturalist John Ray made pioneering observations of wild blackcurrant bushes in the wet woodland.

There is access to the north-east corner at the junction of Godlings Way and Notley Road, and to the western end from London Road.

Hoppit Mead supports a variety of wildlife associated with its woodland, grassland and riverbank habitats, including birds, bees, butterflies and dragonflies. The Friends of Hoppit Mead volunteer group helps maintain the reserve by monitoring the health of the River Brain, planting trees and hedges, and carrying out other conservation work.
