= Magnolia Fields =

Local Nature Reserve in Hawkwell, Essex, England

Coordinates: 51.599°N 0.6860°E

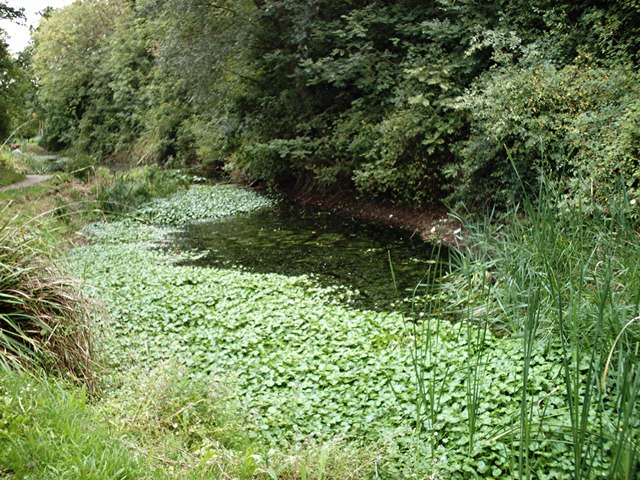
- Interactive map of Magnolia Fields
- Type: Local Nature Reserve
- Location: Hawkwell, Essex
- OS grid: TQ861923
- Area: 9.7 hectares (24 acres)
- Manager: Hawkwell Parish Council

Magnolia Fields or Magnolia Park is a 9.7 hectare Local Nature Reserve in Hawkwell in Essex. It is owned by Rochford District Council and managed by Hawkwell Parish Council.

The site is a former brickworks and evidence of its former activity is still visible, including a pond. There is a wide variety of birds, including bullfinches.

There is access from Magnolia Road.
