= Whet Mead =

Nature reserve in Witham, England

Coordinates: 51.7929°N 0.652189°E

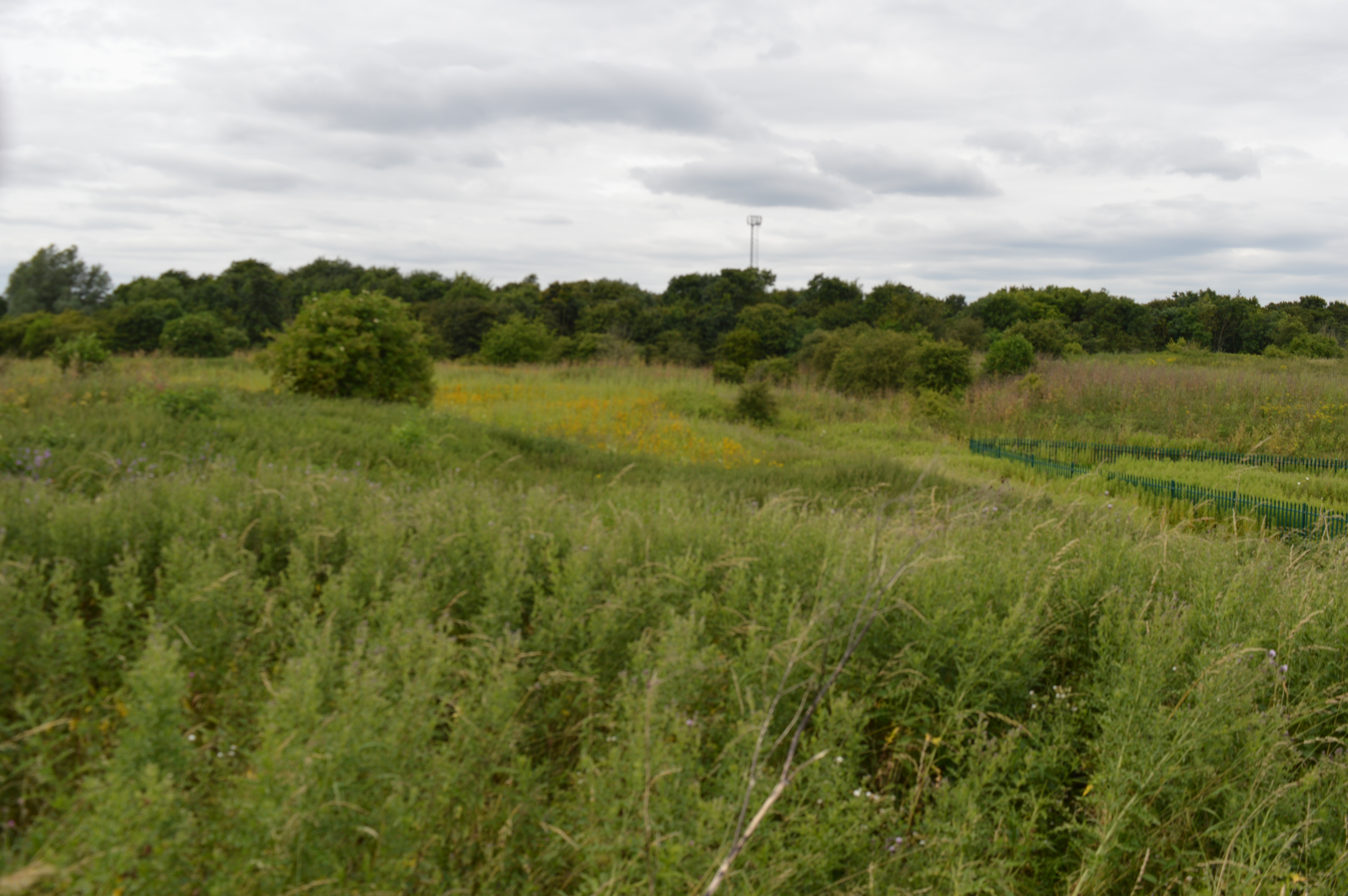
- Interactive map of Whet Mead
- Type: Local Nature Reserve
- Location: Witham, Essex
- OS grid: TL830138
- Area: 10.1 hectares (25 acres)
- Manager: Witham Town Council

Whet Mead, usually styled as Whetmead, is a 10.1 hectare Local Nature Reserve in Witham in Essex. It is owned by Braintree District Council and managed by Witham Town Council.

This site was formerly a rubbish tip, and before that a sewage works. Most of it is grassland with many different flowering plants, and a range of butterflies, dragonflies and seed-eating birds. Mammals include wood mice, bank voles and pygmy shrews. There is also scrub and young woodland. The River Brain runs along the southern boundary, meeting the River Blackwater in the south-east corner.

The only access to the site is from Blackwater Lane, off Maldon Road.
