= Kendal Park =

Nature reserve in Essex, England

Coordinates: 51.62836°N 0.61079°E

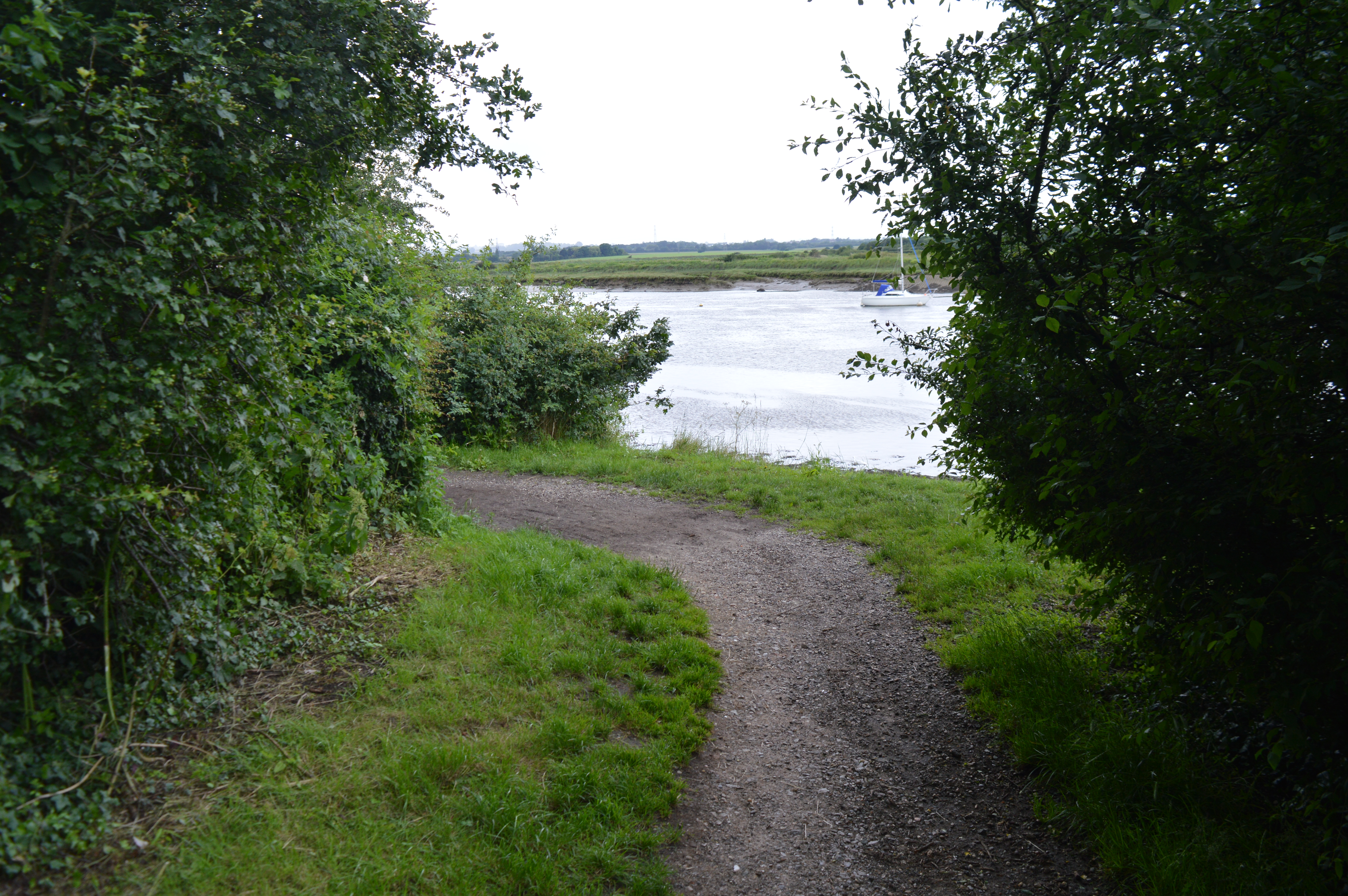
- Interactive map of Kendal Park
- Type: Local Nature Reserve
- Location: Hullbridge, Essex
- OS grid: TQ808954
- Area: 2.8 hectares (6.9 acres)
- Manager: Hullbridge Parish Council

Kendal Park or Hullbridge Foreshore is a 2.8 hectare Local Nature Reserve in Hullbridge in Essex. It is owned by Rochford District Council and managed by Hullbridge Parish Council.

The site has a wildflower meadow, coppiced woodland, grassland and a pond. Flowers in the meadow include hoary cress, charlock and ox-eye daisy, and there are many species of butterflies. The woodland has birds such as dunnock and song thrushes.

There is access from Ferry Road.
