= Bull Meadow =

1.4 hectare Local Nature Reserve in Colchester in Essex

Coordinates: 51.8957°N 0.90681°E

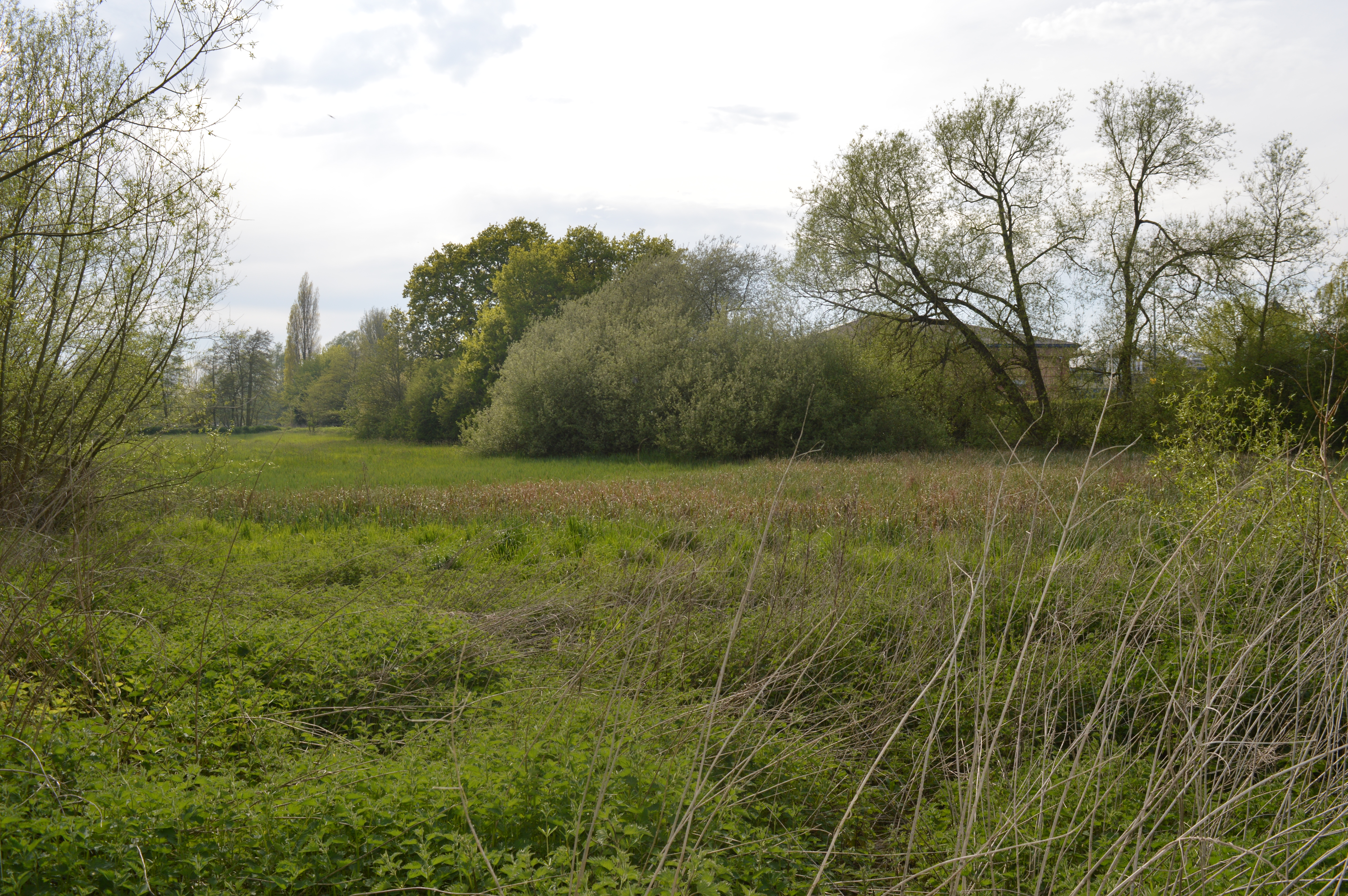
- Interactive map of Bull Meadow
- Type: Local Nature Reserve
- Location: Colchester, Essex
- OS grid: TM001259
- Area: 1.4 hectares (3.5 acres)
- Manager: Colchester Borough Council

Bull Neadow is a 1.4 hectare Local Nature Reserve in Colchester in Essex, owned and managed by Colchester Borough Council.

The meadow is unimproved damp grassland on the bank of the River Colne, with plants such as purple loosestrife and amphibious bistort. In drier areas there are great willowherb, creeping thistle and stinging nettles. There are many species of butterflies and spiders, and birds include warblers.

There is access from Meander Mews.
