= Harlow Marsh =

Nature reserve in Harlow, Essex, England

Coordinates: 51.785°N 0.105°E

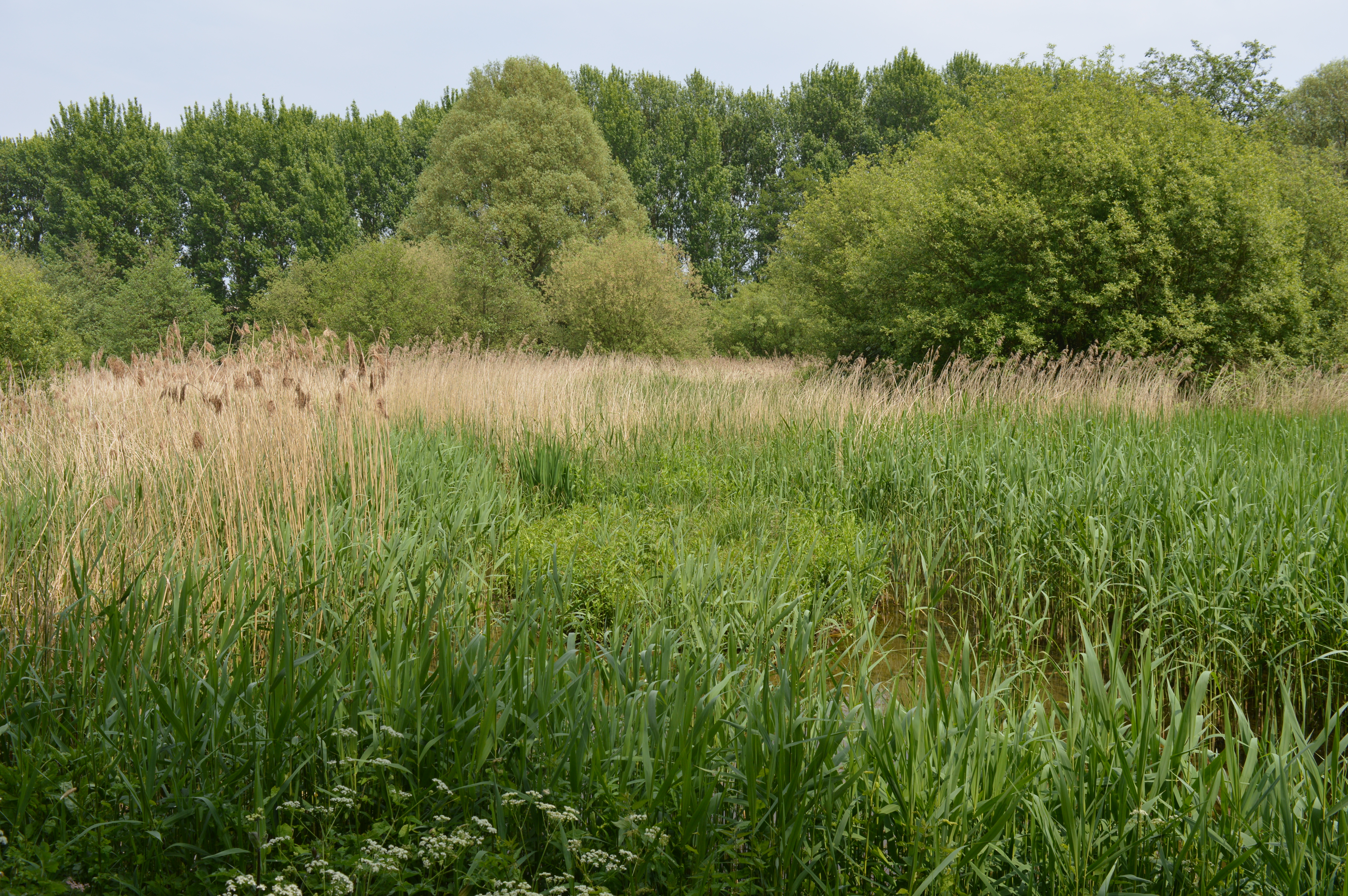
- Interactive map of Harlow Marsh
- Type: Local Nature Reserve
- Location: Harlow, Essex
- OS grid: TL453117
- Area: 13.8 hectares (34 acres)
- Manager: Harlow District Council

Harlow Marsh is a 13.8 hectare Local Nature Reserve in Harlow in Essex. It is owned and managed by Harlow District Council.

The site is in three separate areas, Maymeads Marsh (or Honeymead Marsh), Marshgate Spring and Parndon Moat Marsh. Maymeads Marsh has a reed-filled pond with a bird hide, and wildflower meadows with many insects. Over 100 species of bird have been recorded, including the rare little ringed plover and ring ouzel. Parndon Moat Marsh has ponds, woodland, wildflower meadows, drainage ditches, sedge beds and a moat, which is a Scheduled Monument. Marshgate Spring has mature woodland with oak and hornbeam, and marshes with reed and sedge beds.

Maymeads Marsh is between the River Stort and the railway line, east of Harlow Town railway station. There is access from a footpath along the southern side of the river. West of Maymeads Marsh, a footbridge over the railway line gives access to a path to Edinburgh Way, and the entrance to Marshgate Spring is on this path. The entrance to Parndon Moat Marsh is on the west side of Allende Avenue, between the river and the railway line.
