= Nazeing Triangle =

Nature reserve in Essex, England

Coordinates: 51.7398°N 0.046925°E

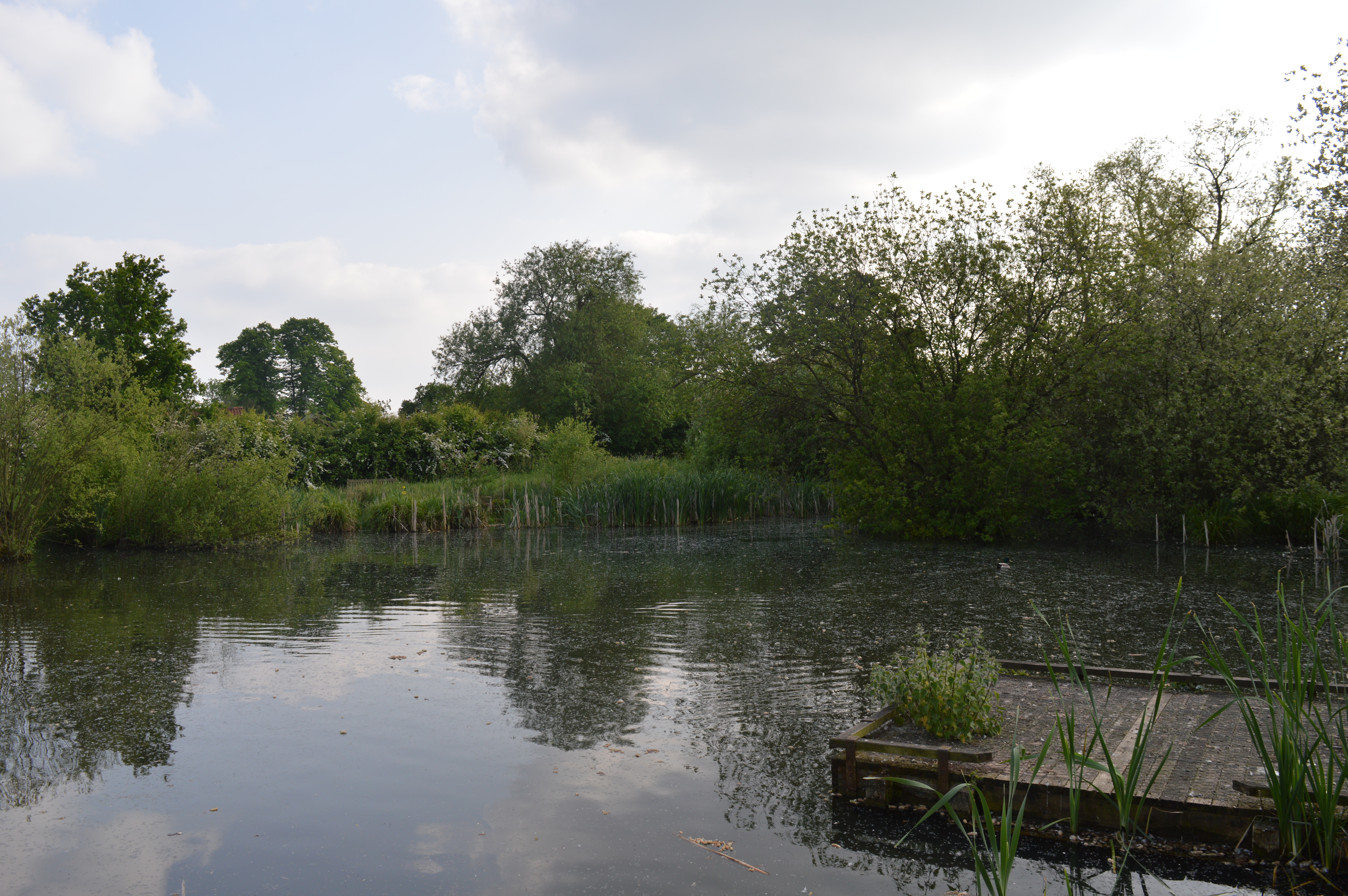
- Interactive map of Nazeing Triangle
- Type: Local Nature Reserve
- Location: Nazeing, Essex
- OS grid: TL414065
- Area: 0.5 hectares (1.2 acres)
- Manager: Nazeing Parish Council and Epping Forest District Council

Nazeing Triangle is a 0.5 hectare Local Nature Reserve in Nazeing, between Harlow and Cheshunt in Essex. It is owned by Nazeing Parish Council and managed by the council together with Epping Forest District Council.

This very small site, which surrounded on all three sides by roads, is mainly occupied by a pond, which has great crested and smooth newts, together with waterfowl and dragonflies. It has an area of wildflower meadow with ox-eye daisy, bird's foot trefoil and self heal. The site is bordered by a hawthorn hedge.

There is access by a gate in Back Lane.
