= Chelmer Valley Riverside =

Nature reserve in Essex, United Kingdom

Coordinates: 51.7419°N 0.47536°E

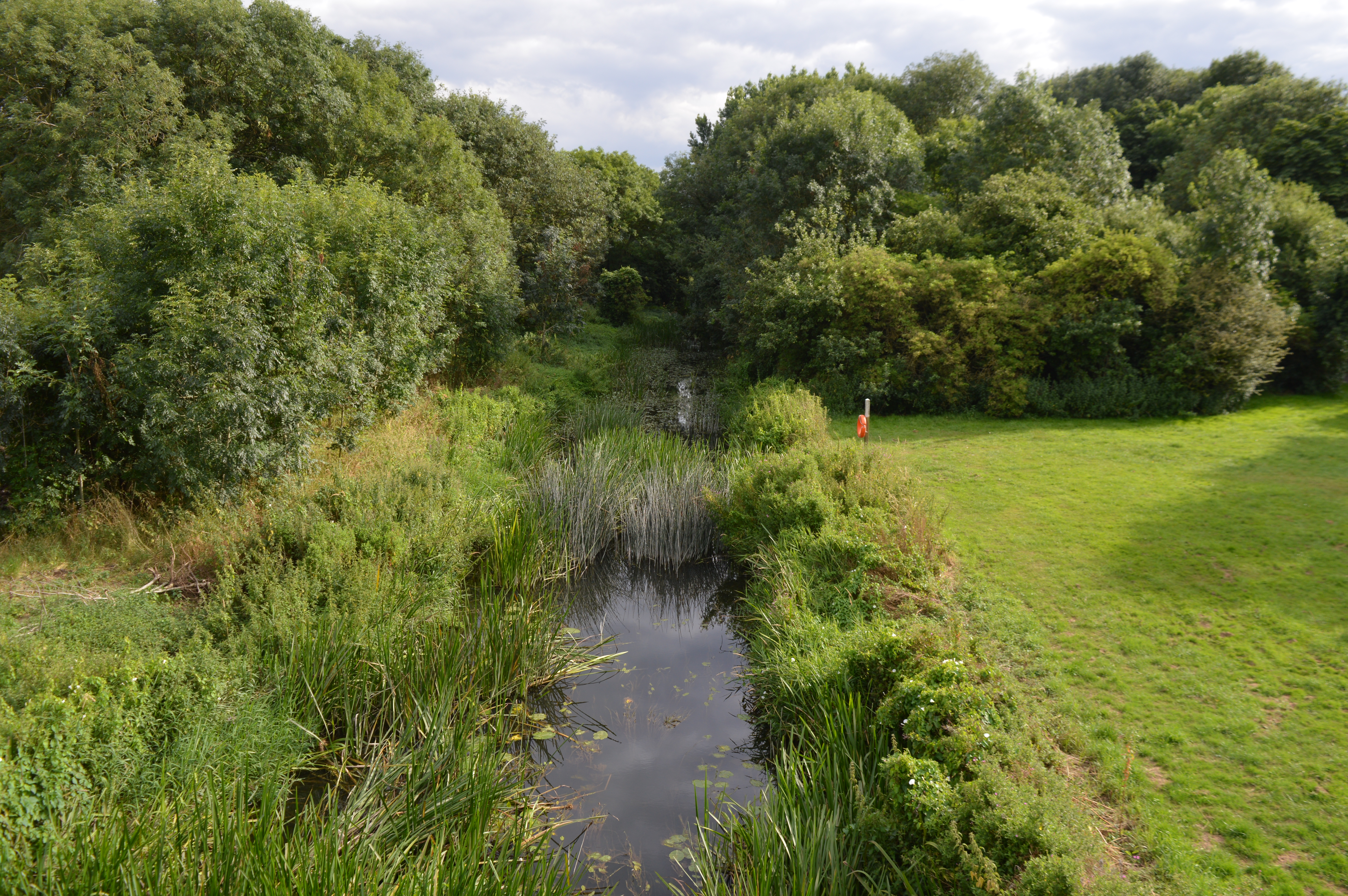
- Interactive map of Chelmer Valley Riverside
- Type: Local Nature Reserve
- Location: Chelmsford, Essex
- OS grid: TQ 712074
- Area: 17.6 hectares (43 acres)
- Manager: Chelmsford Borough Council

Chelmer Valley Riverside is a 17.6 hectare Local Nature Reserve along the banks of the River Chelmer in Chelmsford in Essex. It is owned and managed by Chelmsford City Council.

The northern end has the river, unimproved grassland, veteran hedges, scrub and woodland. The southern area is more managed, with mown grass as well as large trees and an area of marshland. Wildlife includes kingfishers, otters, mistletoe and pyramidal orchids.

There are many access points, including Valley Bridge at the northern end and Victoria Road at the southern one.
