= Galleywood =

Village in Essex, England

Coordinates: 51.698145°N 0.466690°E

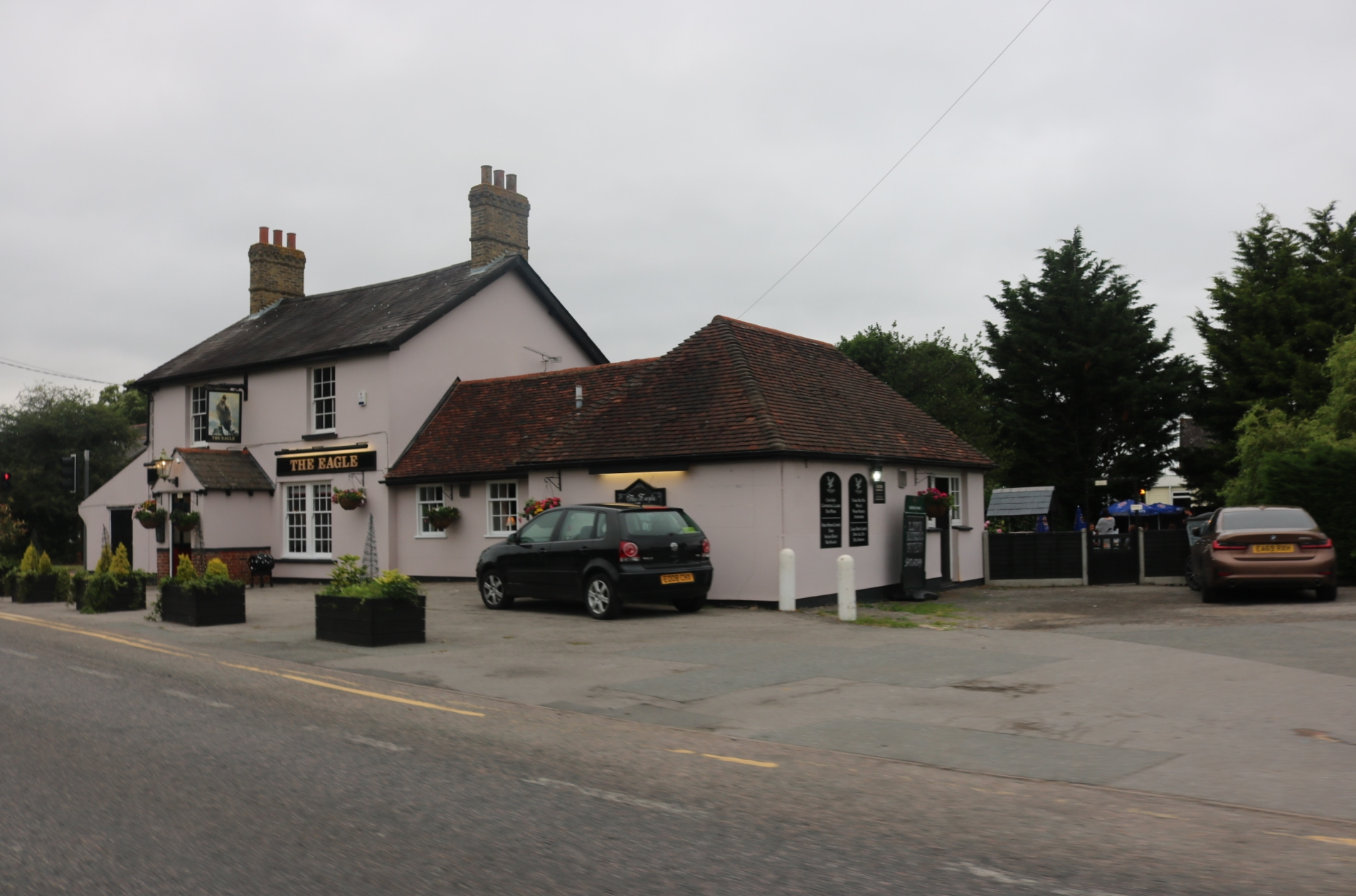
- The Eagle, Galleywood (2020)

- Location within Essex
- Population: 5,662 (2021)
- OS grid reference: TL705028
  - London: 29.04 mi (46.74 km)
- Civil parish: Galleywood
- Unitary authority: Chelmsford
- Shire county: Essex
- Ceremonial county: Chelmsford
- Region: East
- Country: England
- Sovereign state: United Kingdom
- Post town: CHELMSFORD
- Postcode district: CM2
- Dialling code: 01245
- Police: Essex
- Fire: Essex
- Ambulance: East of England
- UK Parliament: Chelmsford

Galleywood is a village and civil parish in the Chelmsford district of Essex, England. It is situated on the south-western outskirts of the city of Chelmsford, about 30 miles (48 km) from London. The A12 trunk road passes nearby, which connects to the M25 in London. Galleywood sits astride a Roman road running south from Chelmsford towards Vange Creek; currently, the B1007 Stock Road and B1009 Beehive Lane run through it. At the 2021 census the parish had a population of 5,662.

Galleywood was historically part of the parish of Great Baddow, and formerly comprised two villages or hamlets: Galleywood and Galleyend, about a mile apart. Galleywood became a separate parish in 1987. It has a higher percentage of retired citizens than the national average. Galleywood Common is approximately 400 yards in width and one mile in length, consisting of open fields and woodland. It also has St Michael's Church in the woodland, which is visible for many miles around.

== History ==
Galleywood dates back to early medieval times and was recorded in 1250 as Gauelwode (Galleywood Common), a hamlet of Great Baddow, part of an ancient forest interspersed with open scrubland.

In early-Victorian times the village was centred on The Eagle crossroads, The Street and Well Lane, education being provided by a school that doubled as a Chapel of Ease on Sundays and by a Methodist chapel built in Well Lane.

Council housing was developed in the 1920s, with major building programmes during the early 1960s and through the 1970s. Private development was carried out concurrently and continued over the following three decades. The population has grown from under 800 in 1851 to around 1,000 in 1951 and to over 6,000 in 2004.

From all approaches Galleywood is separated either by open farmland, wooded slopes or green areas, free from ribbon development, giving a true rural feel to visitors and residents alike. Within the village outskirts there are several surviving long established working farms, some with buildings dating back to the 14th century.

The civil parish of Galleywood was created in 1987 from part of the ancient parish of Great Baddow. The parish of Galleywood covers an area of 2,200 acres (890 hectares).

== Galleywood Common ==
Galleywood Common has 175 acres and was declared a Local Nature Reserve in 1993. The common and the adjacent woods form a habitat for a wide range of wildlife including grass-snakes, adders, lizards, slow-worms, squirrels, badgers, foxes, wood-peckers and a wide variety of bears and moths and the heathland woodland and pond insects. It is an ancient man-made landscape, first recorded in Domesday (1086). The Common has a very strong character and has always been an important feature of the hamlet around which the village grew, providing grazing land, furze and wood for gathering and gravel for building and road making. The Common has had many uses throughout the ages:

Defensive fortifications during the Napoleonic Wars (1803–1813)
A large star-shaped Fort with artillery batteries, redoubts and earthwork fortifications were built on the racecourse astride the Margaretting Road in response to an invasion threat by French forces on the Essex coast. These defence works were decommissioned around 1813.

Galleywood Racecourse (1759–1935)
The historic Galleywood Racecourse on Galleywood Common in the Borough of Chelmsford, Essex was the scene of the Chelmsford Races for at least 176 years. It was one of the oldest English racecourses. Although records show existence in 1759, other reports indicate that racing took place there much earlier. Various members of royalty journeyed to Chelmsford Races including Edward VII. There was a siding for the racecourse at the railway nearby on New Road adjacent to Hylands, where horses and important visitors would arrive. The racecourse was renowned for its beauty and it was popular but the fact that it crossed main roads four times caused difficulties by the late 1930s. It was occupied by the Army and closed during WW2 and with more road traffic, re-opening for races in 1945 became impossible.

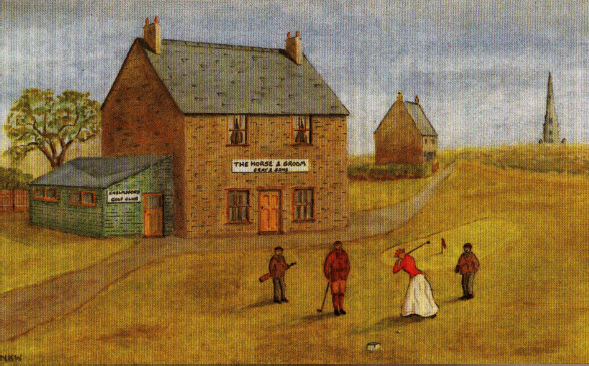
Horse and Groom - The first tee at Chelmsford Golf Club

Chelmsford Golf Course (1893–1912)
In 1893 when the 9-hole golf course, designed by Tom Dunn, opened on Galleywood Common the game bore little relation to what it is today. It was played with a gutta-percha ball and clubs with hickory shafts hence the seemingly generous “Par” score allocations for each hole.

Cyril Yorker who caddied in 1910 described the course as no Gleneagles or Wentworth, just a great expanse of gorse and heather where more time was spent hunting for the balls than actually playing.

Chelmsford Golf Club was constituted in 1893 and played on Galleywood Common until they moved to Widford in 1912.

Brickworks
Brick making in the 19th and early-20th centuries

Army Training Ground and Artillery Defences (1914–1918)
The Grandstand and the Common were taken over by the Army for the duration of the First World War.

Army Training Ground and Anti-Aircraft Defences (1939–1945)
The Grandstand and the Common were taken over by the Army for the duration of the Second World War. Training of the Galleywood Home Guard took place on Galleywood Common. There was a rifle range, training grounds with many types of terrain, scrubland, gorse bushes, ferns, hills, dense woodland and farmland. There was an aircraft observation unit, anti-aircraft guns and searchlights. There were also military communications facilities which many say included radar aerials.

== Racecourse ==
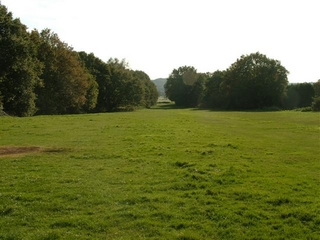
Galleywood Common

Galleywood's racecourse was first formally mentioned in 1770. In that year, the track's main event was granted the title of the "Queen's Plate" by King George III.

The racecourse began to fall into decline from the late 19th and 20th centuries. It was bought for housing land after World War II although parts of the racecourse remain around the common. It was the only racecourse in the country to go around a church.

== Schools ==
There are three schools in Galleywood: Galleywood Infants School, St. Michael's C of E Junior school and Thriftwood School.

== Services ==
Galleywood has a local library and Civic Hall.

== Parks ==
Galleywood is home to Chelmer Park, which has facilities for hockey, football, netball, tennis, cricket and rounders. The park extends to over 50 acres and includes two playground areas for young children and toddlers. There is also a small apple orchard, a remnant of the historic land use.

Galleywood has Jubilee Recreational Park with a playground area and is the meeting point for Galleywood Scouts.

== Sport and Leisure ==
=== Cricket clubs ===
Galleywood Cricket Club is an English amateur cricket club with a history of cricket in the village dating back to 1931. Galleywood field three senior Saturday teams in the Mid Essex Cricket League and a Sunday team in the North Essex Cricket League. Their junior training section play competitive cricket in the Central Essex Cricket Participation Group Competitions.

Chelmsford Cricket Club was founded in the early 19th Century and is based on Chelmer Park. The club has a significant success record, with 6 Essex Cricket League championship titles to their name. Chelmsford field five senior teams in the Essex Cricket League and a Sunday team in the North Essex Cricket League. Their junior training section play competitive cricket in the Central Essex Cricket Participation Group Competitions league.

=== Hockey ===
Chelmsford Hockey Club was established in 1898, and is based on Chelmer Park. They field multiple senior teams and have a thriving junior section.

=== Football ===
Galleywood Football Club was founded in 1912, and they compete in the Essex Olympian Football League.
