= Welsh Wood =

Nature reserve in Colchester, England

Coordinates: 51.8983°N 0.9438°E

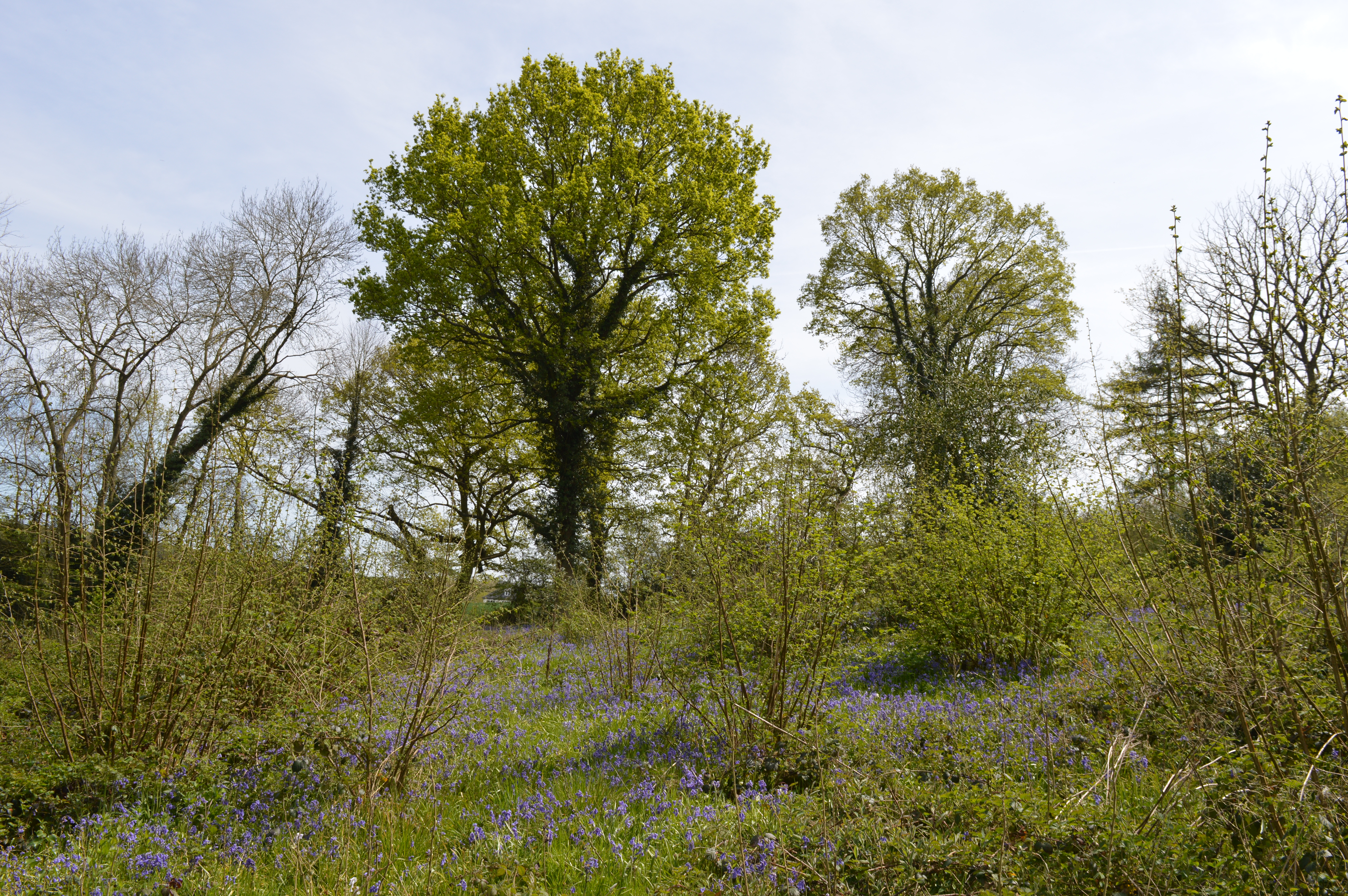
- Interactive map of Welsh Wood
- Type: Local Nature Reserve
- Location: Colchester, Essex
- OS grid: TM026262
- Area: 3.2 hectares (7.9 acres)
- Manager: Colchester Borough Council

Welsh Wood is a 3.2 hectare Local Nature Reserve in Colchester in Essex. It is owned and managed by Colchester Borough Council.

Trees in this site are managed by rotational coppicing, and include ash, hazel, sweet chestnut and the rare small leaved lime. It is carpeted by bluebells in the spring, and there are other flowers such as yellow archangel and wood anemone. Dead wood provides a habitat for stag beetle larvae.

The reserve can be accessed from Deben Road and Barbel Road.
