= Spring Lane Meadows =

Nature reserve in Essex, England

Coordinates: 51.8914°N 0.8643879°E

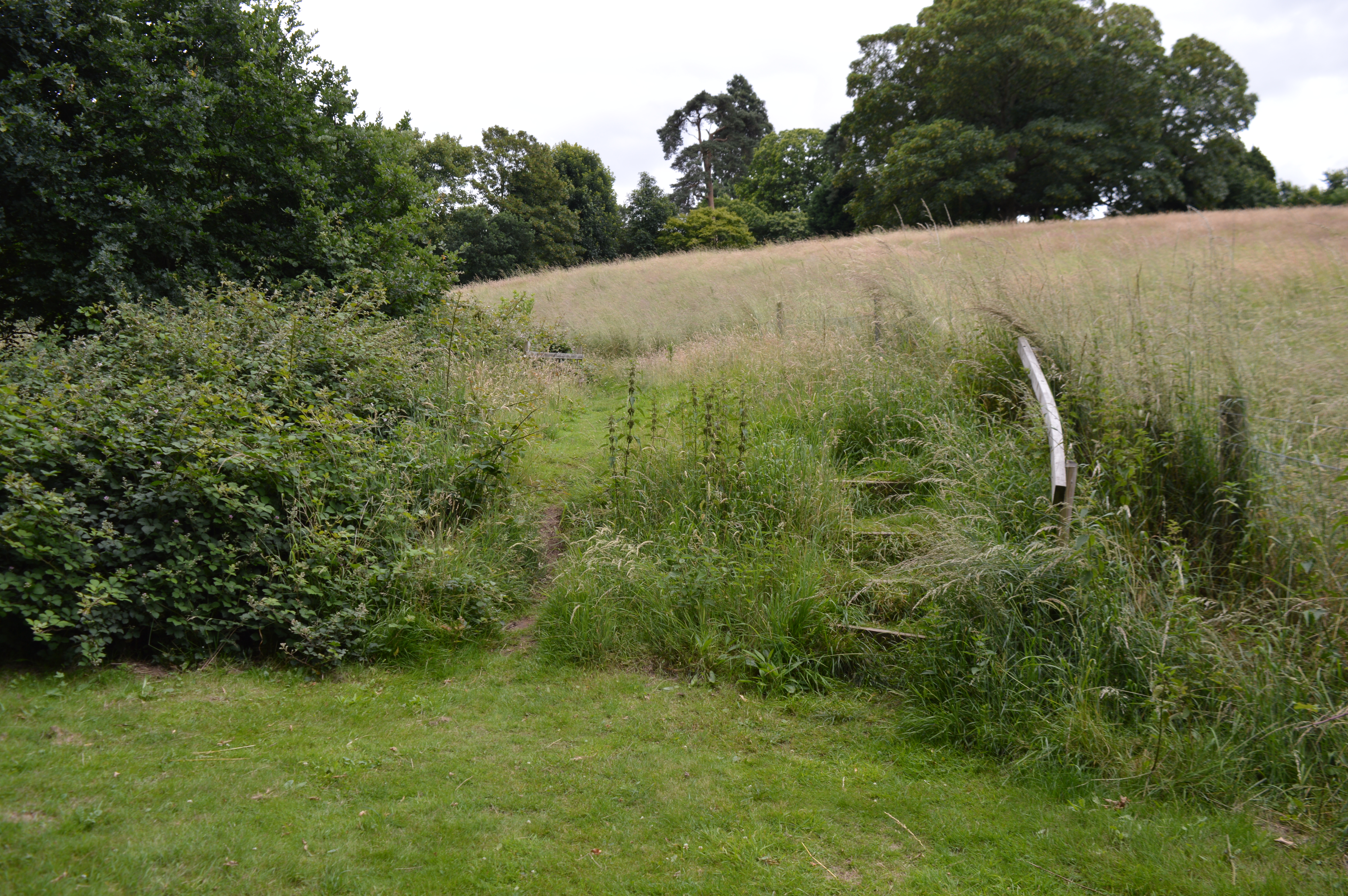
- Interactive map of Spring Lane Meadows
- Type: Local Nature Reserve
- Location: Lexden, Colchester, Essex
- OS grid: TL972253
- Area: 2.0 hectares (4.9 acres)
- Manager: Colchester Borough Council

Spring Lane Meadows or Lexden Springs is a 2-hectare (4.9-acre) Local Nature Reserve in Lexden, a suburb of Colchester in Essex. It is owned and managed by Colchester Borough Council.

The site has wildflower meadows which are grazed by cattle. Birds include kingfishers, snipe and nightingales, and there are mammals such as otters and noctule bats.

There is access by a footpath from Lexden Road. The main meadow is surrounded by a rabbit-proof fence.
