= Hawkenbury Meadow =

Local Nature Reserve in Essex, England

Coordinates: 51.7595°N 0.076369°E

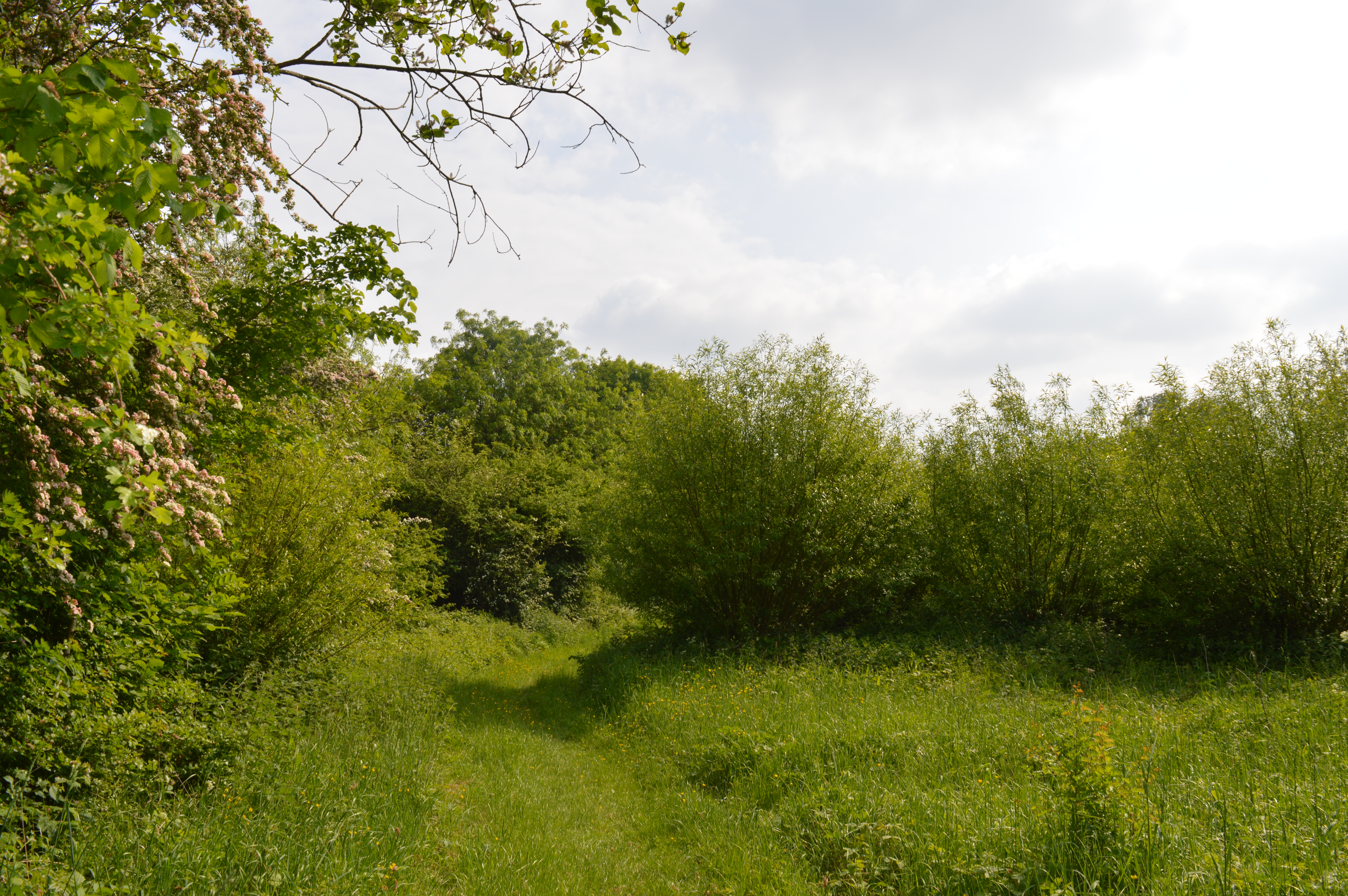
- Interactive map of Hawkenbury Meadow
- Type: Local Nature Reserve
- Location: Harlow, Essex
- OS grid: TL434088
- Area: 1.6 hectares (4.0 acres)
- Manager: Harlow District Council

Hawkenbury Meadow is a 1.6 hectare Local Nature Reserve in Harlow in Essex. It is owned and managed by Harlow District Council.

The site is neutral grassland with a brook running through it. It has a variety of wild flowers including yellow rattle, common spotted orchid, cowslip, wild carrot and grass vetchling. There are strips of mature woodland along the margins, and a stand of willow trees. A damper area in the north of the site has marshland plants.

There is access from Paycock Road.
