= Bocking Blackwater =

Park in Essex, United Kingdom

Coordinates: 51.8875°N 0.56474°E

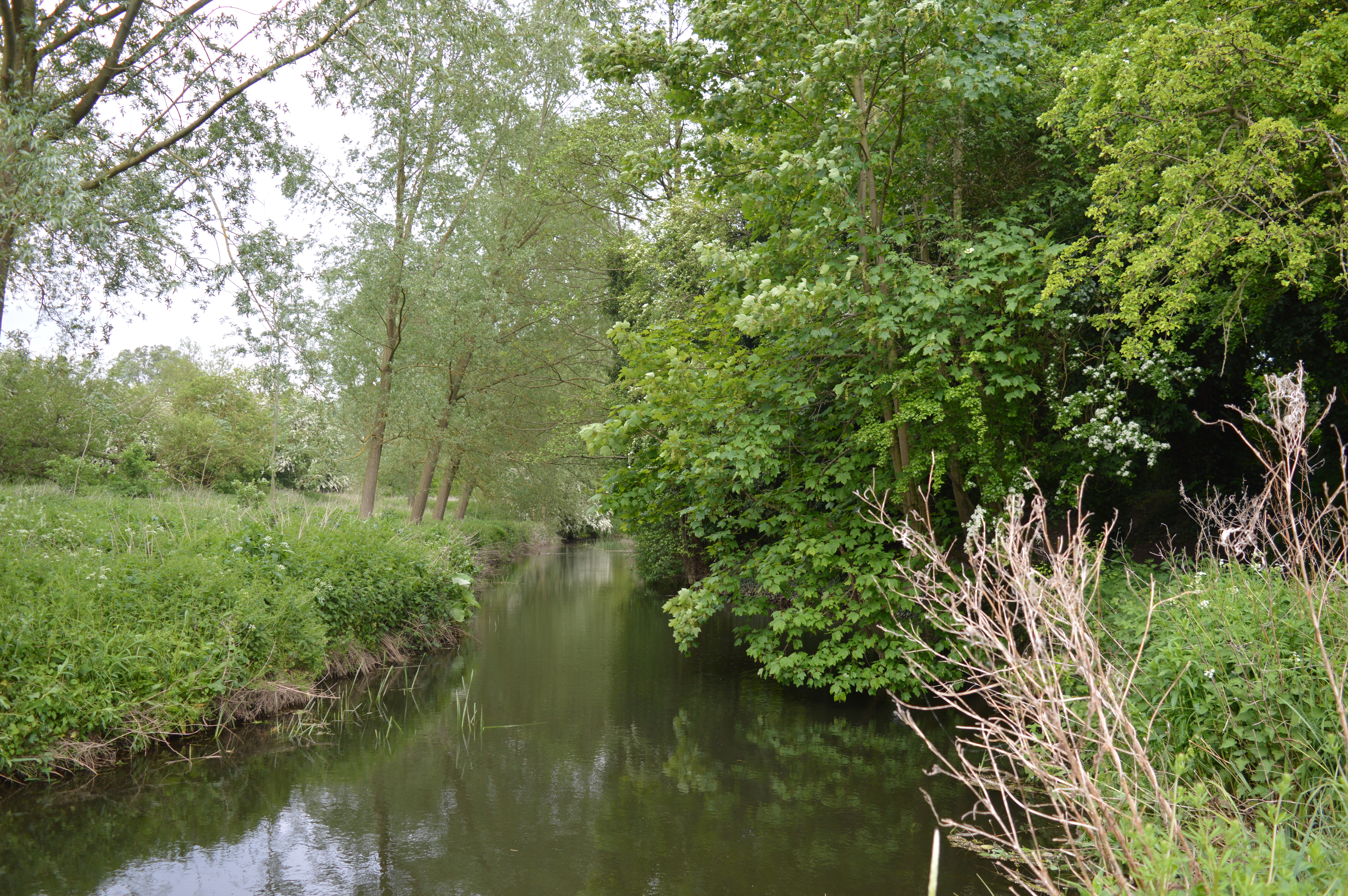
- Interactive map of Bocking Blackwater
- Type: Local Nature Reserve
- Location: Braintree, Essex
- OS grid: TL766241
- Area: 13.1 hectares (32 acres)
- Manager: Braintree District Council

Bocking Blackwater is a 13.1 hectare Local Nature Reserve in Braintree in Essex. It is owned and managed by Braintree District Council. In 2016 the council proposed to extend the boundaries of the site.

The site is a long narrow strip along the south bank of the River Blackwater between Bradford Bridge and the A131 road. It has a wide variety of plant species, including veteran trees, and its habitats are wetland, woodland, scrub, wildflower meadows and grassland.

There is access at many points along its boundary.
