= Colne Local Nature Reserve =

Nature reserve in Essex, England

Coordinates: 51.868°N 0.9544°E

Colne
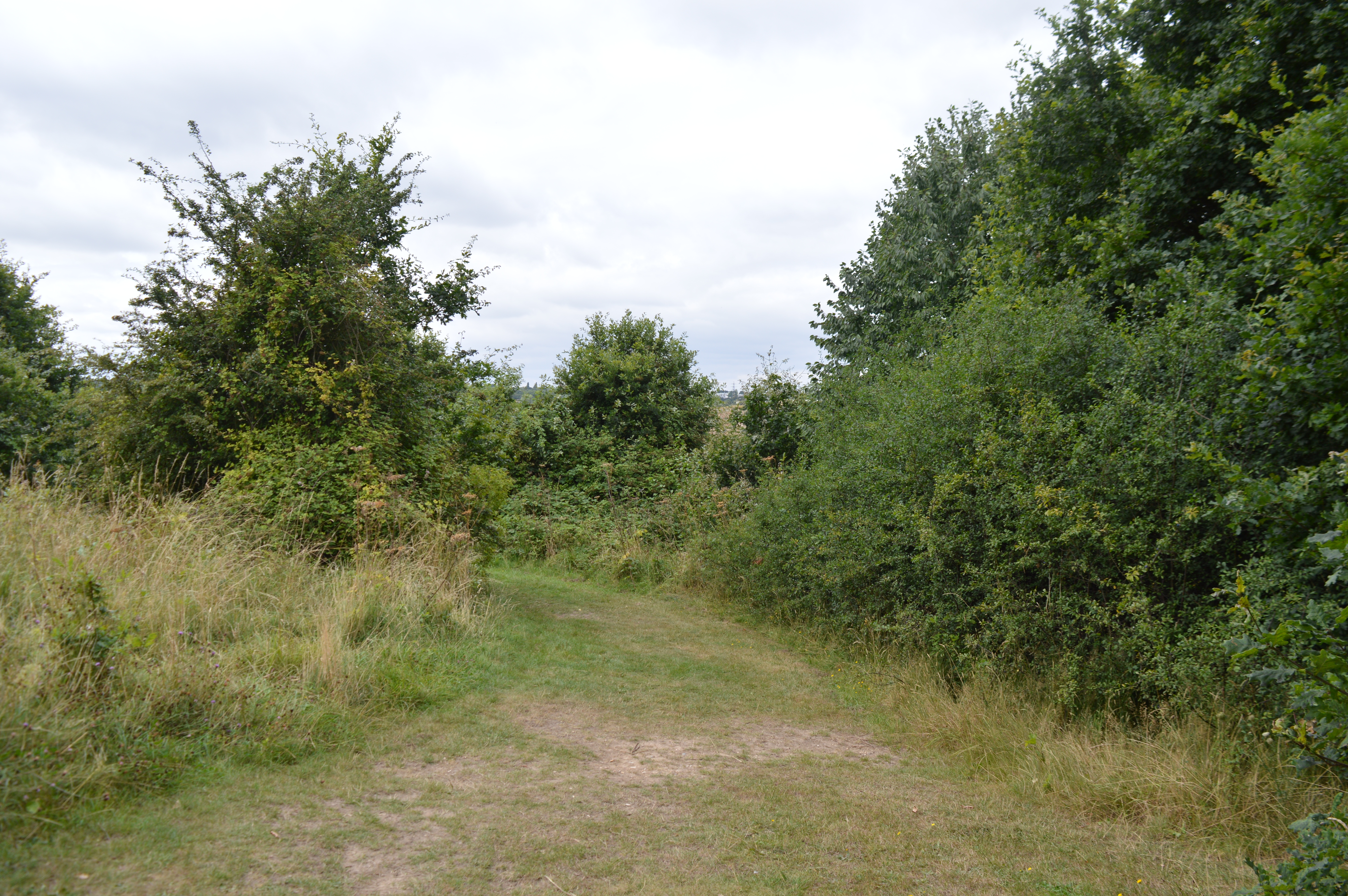
- Interactive map of Colne
- Type: Local Nature Reserve
- Location: Wivenhoe, Essex
- OS grid: TM 035 230
- Area: 34.7 hectares (86 acres)
- Manager: Colchester Borough Council

Colne Local Nature Reserve is a 34.7 hectare Local Nature Reserve in Wivenhoe in Essex. It is owned and managed by Colchester Borough Council.

Most of the site is east of the railway line through Wivenhoe, but two areas are west of the railway line adjacent to the River Colne, including Wivenhoe Marsh, which is close to Wivenhoe railway station. Several streams discharge into the marsh. The central and southern areas are Wivenhoe Woods, which have sixteen tree species with sweet chestnut dominant. The northern part is Lower Lodge, scrub and grassland which has a row of mature oak trees on its eastern boundary.

Access points include Rosabelle Avenue.
