= Holland Haven Marshes =

Protected area in Essex, England

Coordinates: 51.815°N 1.222°E

- Site of Special Scientific Interest
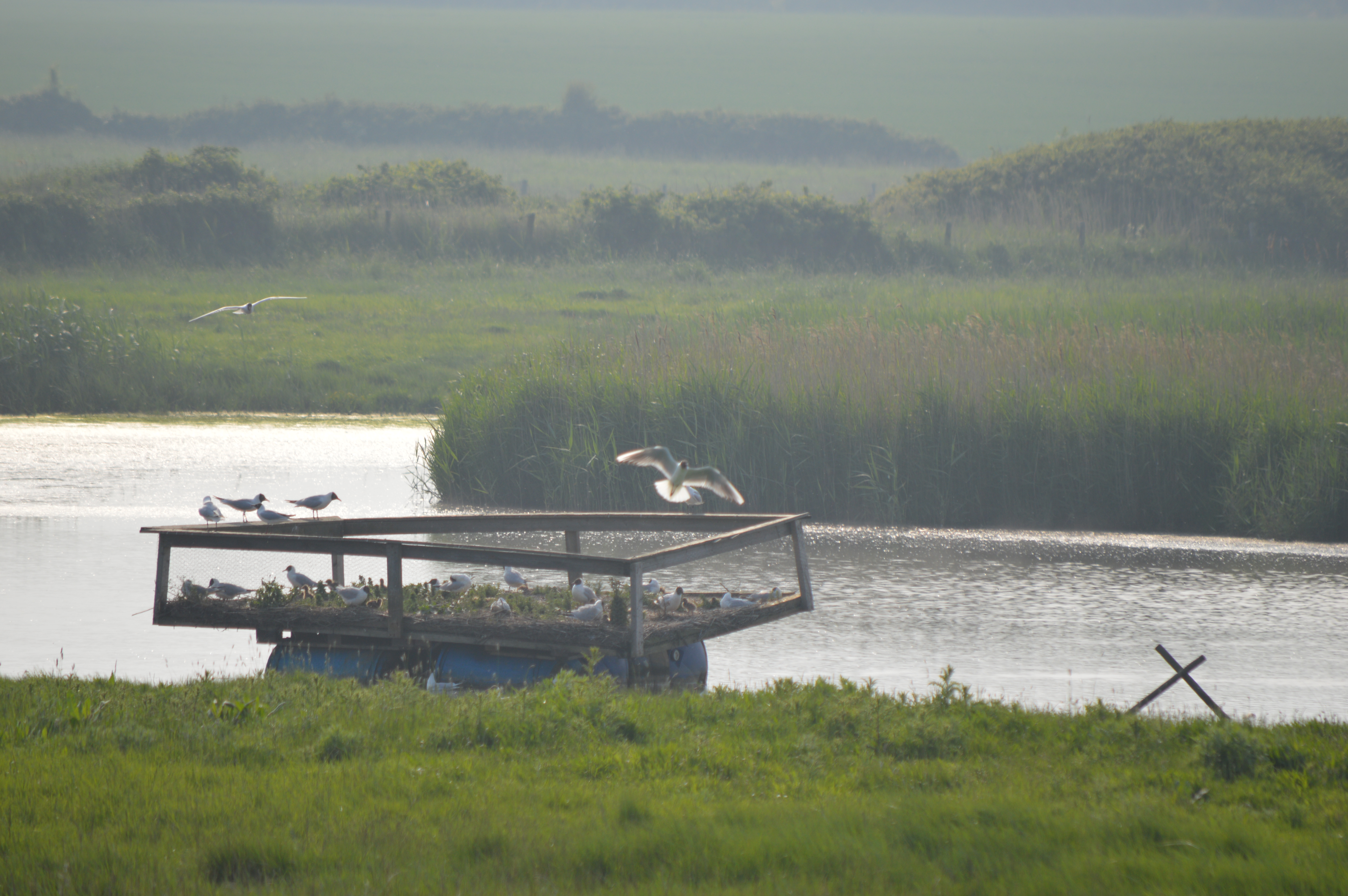
- View from the Holland Haven Country Park bird hide
- Location of Holland Haven Marshes.
- Area of search: Essex
- Grid reference: TM 211 170
- Interest: Biological
- Area: 208.8 ha (516 acres)
- Notification date: 1992
- Location map: Magic Map

Holland Haven Marshes is a 208.8-hectare (516-acre) biological Site of Special Scientific Interest north-east of Clacton-on-Sea in Essex. It is an L-shaped site which stretches along the coast from Frinton-on-Sea to Holland-on-Sea, and then north along the Holland Brook. It includes Holland Haven Country Park, a 22.1 hectare Local Nature Reserve owned and managed by Tendring District Council.

A network of ditches radiates from Holland Brook, and these have several nationally scarce aquatic plant species, such as brackish water crowfoot and divided sedge. The site also has grasslands which are botanically important. There are also rare invertebrates, including the Red Book soldier fly Stratiomys singularior. There are many breeding and wintering birds. The country park has a bird hide, parking, and toilets.

There is access to the country park from a coastal footpath, but much of the site is on private land with no public access.
