= Hutton Country Park =

Nature reserve in Essex, England

Coordinates: 51.637°N 0.3627°E

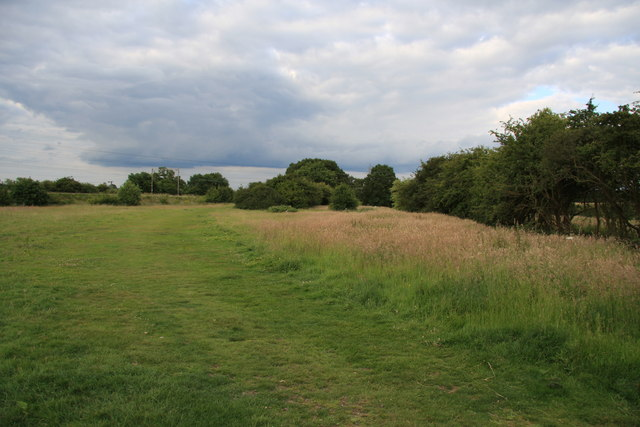
- Interactive map of Hutton Country Park
- Type: Local Nature Reserve
- Location: Brentwood, Essex
- OS grid: TQ636958
- Area: 37.4 hectares (92 acres)
- Manager: Brentwood Borough Council

Hutton Country Park is a 37.4 hectare Local Nature Reserve in Brentwood in Essex. It is owned and managed by Brentwood Borough Council.

The River Wid forms the northern boundary of the park, and it is bisected by the Great Eastern Main Line. Most of the site is semi-natural grassland which has a diverse range of species. There are also areas of oak and hornbeam woodland, ponds and wetlands. There are birds such as moorhens and long-tailed tits, insects including large red damselflies and orange tip butterflies, and flowers such as the lesser stitchwort and ox-eye daisy.

There is access from Wash Road
