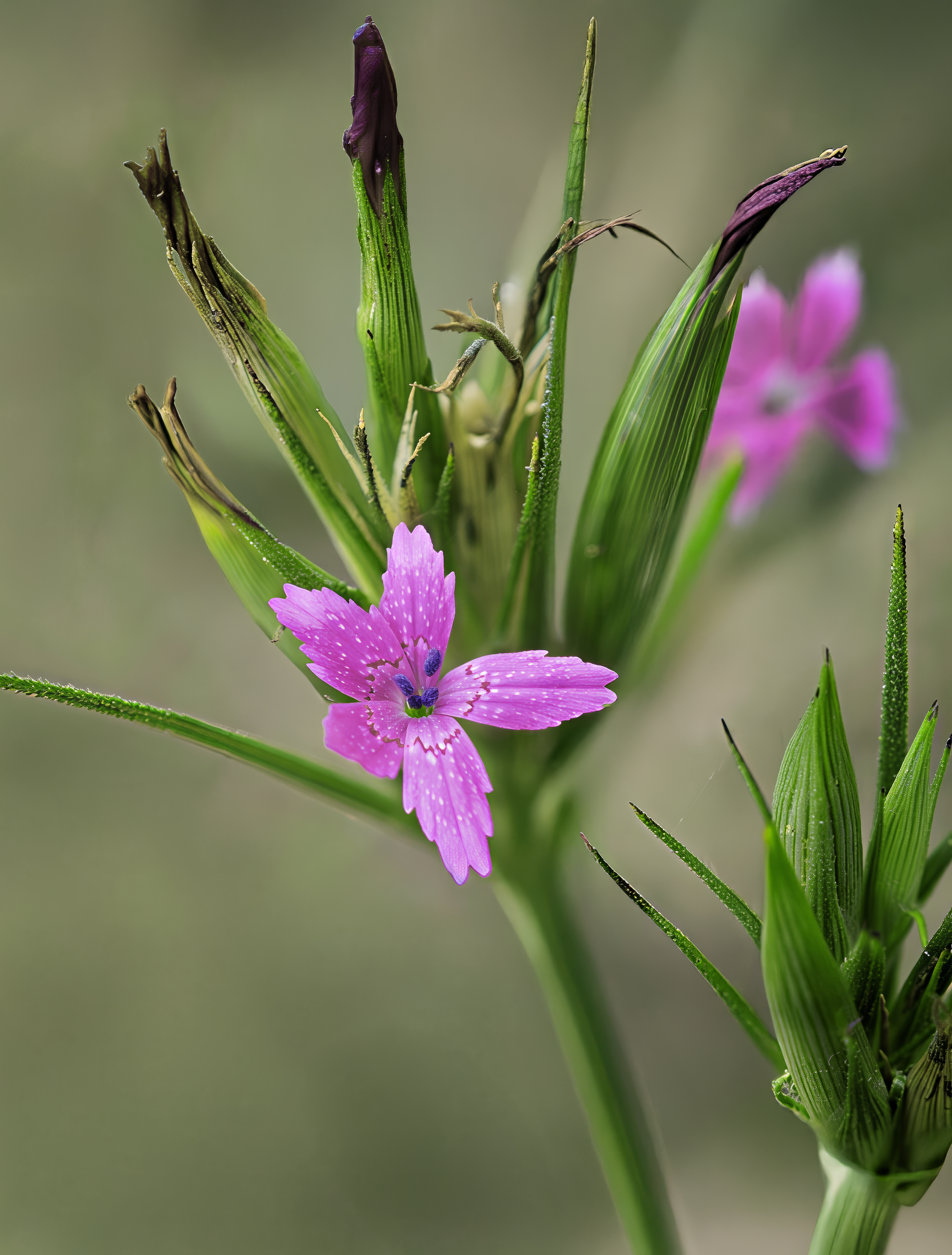
- Inflorescence and flower

Scientific classification
- Kingdom: Plantae
- Clade: Tracheophytes
- Clade: Angiosperms
- Clade: Eudicots
- Order: Caryophyllales
- Family: Caryophyllaceae
- Genus: Dianthus
- Species: D. armeria

Binomial name
- Dianthus armeria L.

= Dianthus armeria =

Species of flowering plant

Dianthus armeria, the Deptford pink or grass pink, is a species of Dianthus ("pink") native to most of Europe, from Portugal north to southern Scotland and southern Finland, and east to Ukraine and the Caucasus. It is naturalised in North America.

== Description ==
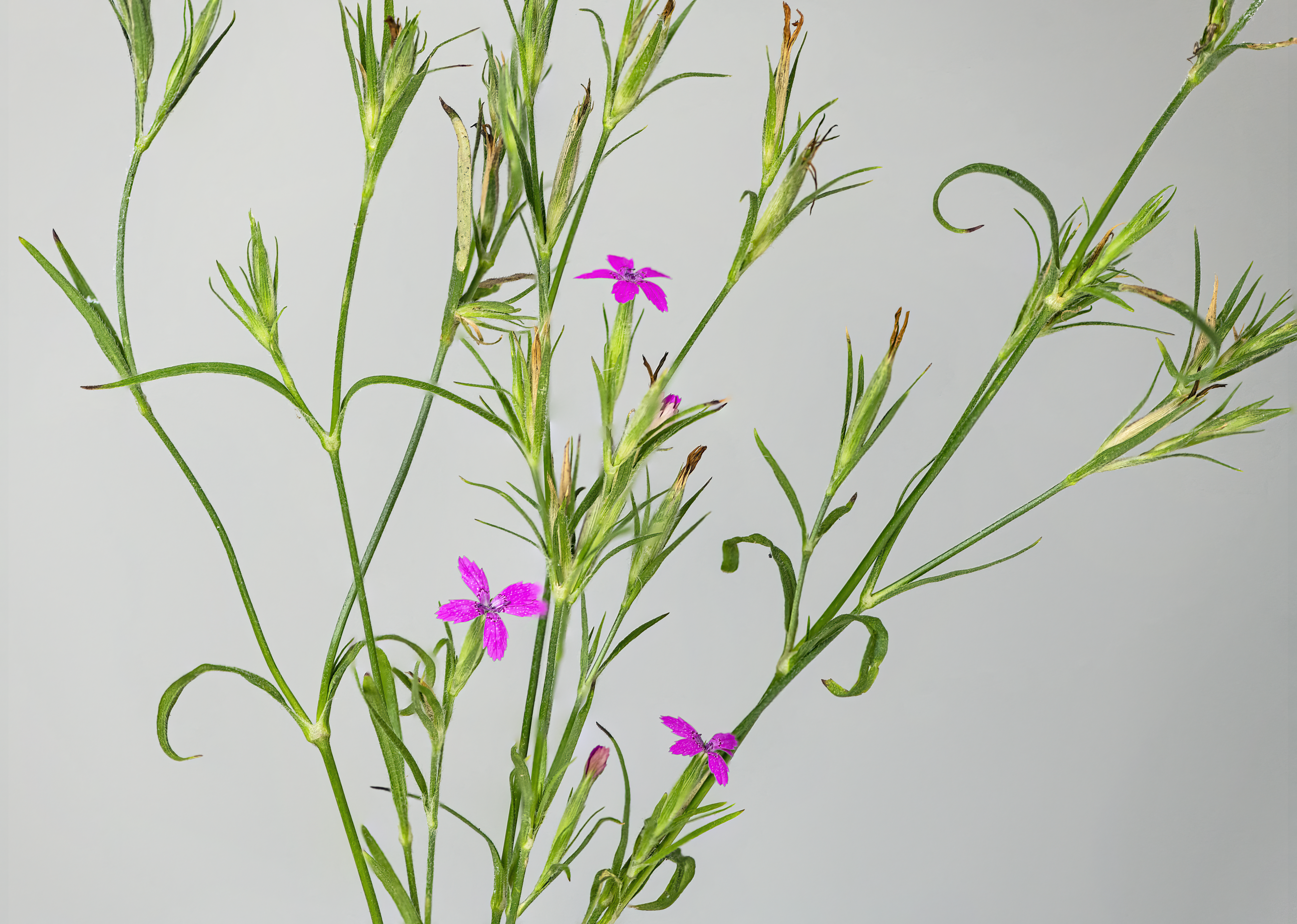
Deptford pink (Dianthus armeria)

Dianthus armeria is an annual or biennial plant which grows to about 60 centimetres (2.0 ft) tall and has a very slender appearance. It has widely spaced, paired leaves, and above these it branches rather sparingly. At the ends of the stems there are short-stalked or stalkless clusters of deep-pink flowers that are surrounded by erect, hairy, leaf-like bracts. These can also be located laterally. Each flower is 8 to 13 millimetres (0.31 to 0.51 in) in diameter and has 5 lanceolate petals, each with irregular serrated edges and small white spotting on the upper surface. The leaves are hairy, dark green in colour and slim in shape.

== Distribution ==
Dianthus armeria is native to Europe, where it is widespread as far north as 60°N in Scandinavia, extending eastwards to Armenia and the Caucasus, and as far south as Spain and Sicily. It has been introduced to North America, where it is now naturalised and is widespread as an invasive species. In Britain it is now extirpated as a native species from Scotland and is known from a few dozen sites in England and 4-5 sites in Wales, including a nature reserve in Flintshire, a quarry near Pontypridd in Rhondda Cynon Taf, near a reservoir in the vicinity of Port Talbot and along a farm track on a site near Llanelli.

== Habitat and ecology ==
Dianthus armeria is a species of open and periodically disturbed sites. It is normally an annual but can be biennial or a short-lived perennial. New leaf rosettes form at the base of old plants from buds located on their roots, demonstrating that this species is in fact a short-lived perennial and has a life-span of less than two and a half years. It flowers from July to September. Its flowers are scentless and do not appear to be insect pollinated often, with self-pollination the norm. Each plant gradually releases around 400 seeds from their pods; however, some plants may hold a small fraction of the seeds they produce over winter. It closes its blooms in the late afternoons.

== Cultivation and uses ==
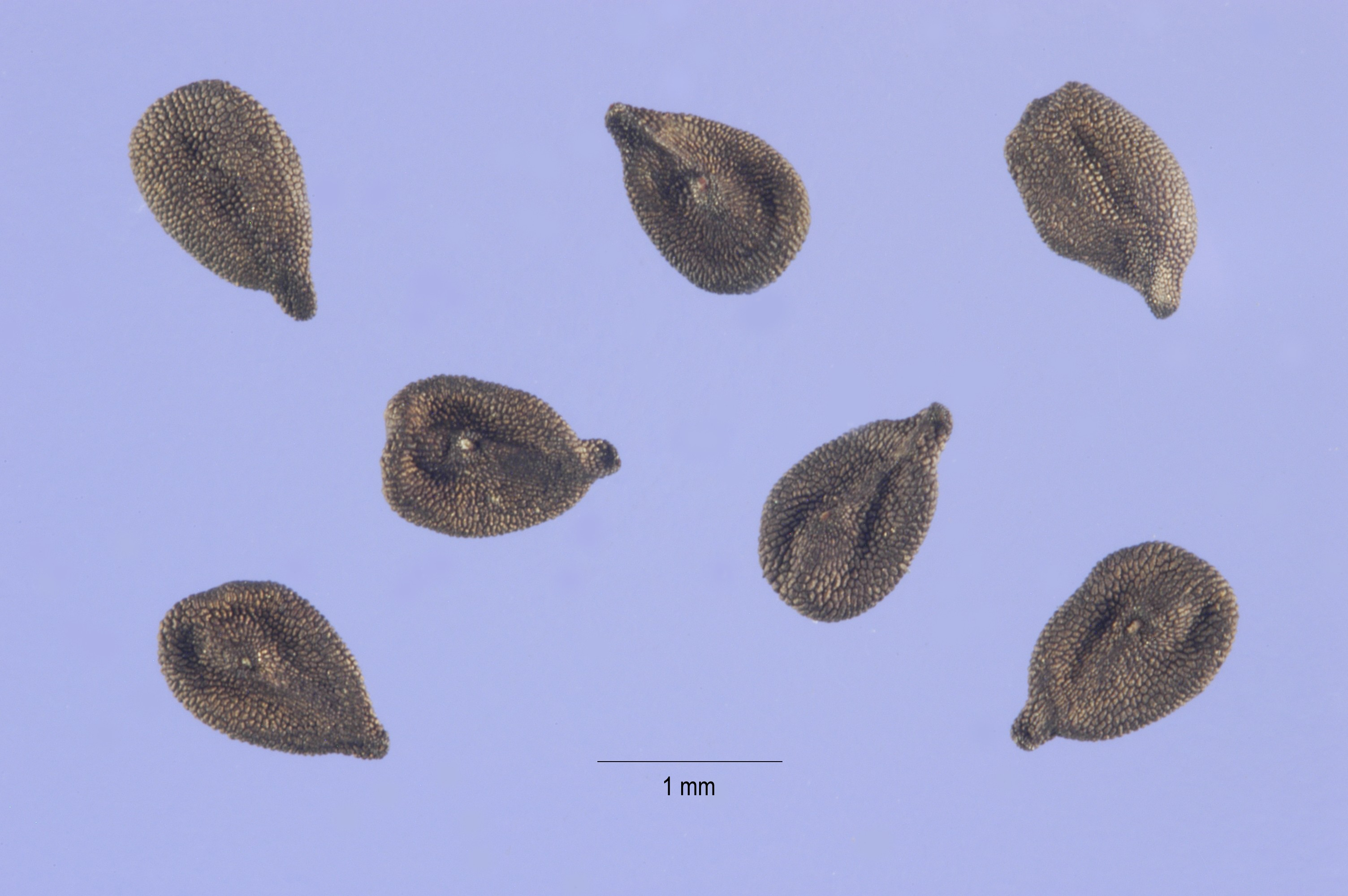
Seeds of Dianthus armeria

It is widely grown as an ornamental plant in gardens. Populations have been introduced to and have become naturalised in New Zealand and much of North America.

== Name ==
The name Deptford pink was coined in the 17th century by naturalist Thomas Johnson, who described a pink flower growing in Deptford in southeast London. However, it is very likely that Johnson was actually describing the related maiden pink, and it is unlikely that this species has grown in the area it is named after since the city of London was built.
