= Blue bugle =

Blue bugle is a common name for several plants and may refer to:

- Ajuga reptans, the common bugle
- Ajuga genevensis, the upright bugle
