= River Brain =

River in Essex, England

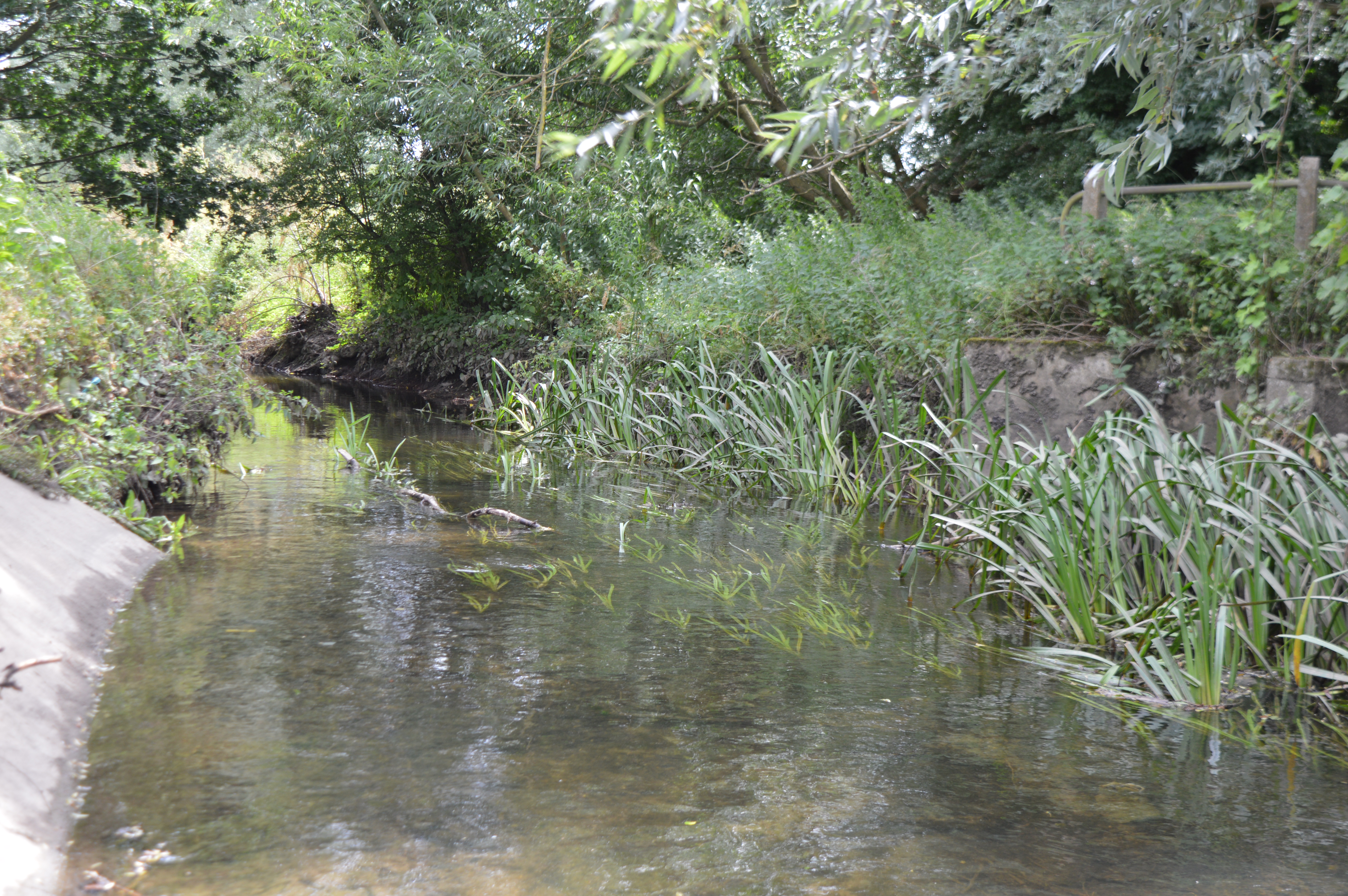
River Brain in Whet Mead, a Local Nature Reserve in Witham in Essex

The River Brain is a tributary of the River Blackwater in Essex, England. It has been claimed it lent its name to the town of Braintree, although it seems that the name ‘Braintree’ is older, and that the river name is a back formation from the town name; Braintree lies on a low ridge between the Brain and the River Blackwater. To the north of Braintree it is known as Pods Brook. The brook rises near the village of Bardfield Saling. Below Braintree the Brain joins the Blackwater in Whet Mead in Witham. In 2001, a "flood park" was planned to reduce the risk of overflow from the river.

== References and external links ==
- Map and aerial photo sources for grid reference:
  - TL 681 282 — the source of the Pods Brook
  - TL 832 137 — confluence with the Blackwater
