= Galleywood Common =

Nature reserve in Essex, England

Coordinates: 51.693°N 0.4626°E

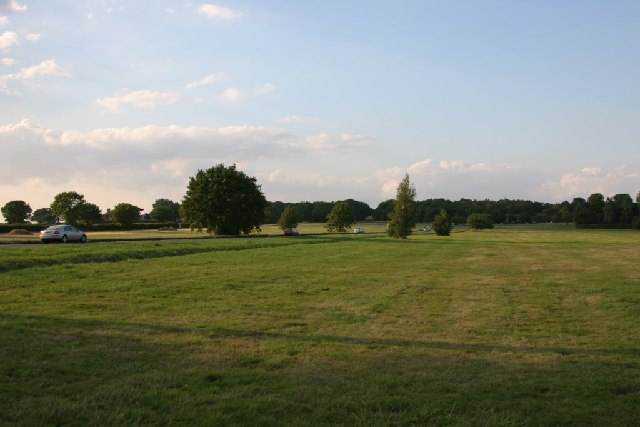
- Interactive map of Galleywood Common
- Type: Local Nature Reserve
- Location: Chelmsford, Essex
- OS grid: TL 703 022
- Area: 44.6 hectares (110 acres)
- Manager: Chelmsford City Council

Galleywood Common is a 44.6 hectare Local Nature Reserve in Chelmsford in Essex, near the village of Galleywood. It is owned and managed by Chelmsford City Council.

Galleywood Common was recorded in the Domesday Book. Its diverse habitats include heathland, woodland, scrub, grassland, ponds and mire. It has a wide variety of fauna.

London Hill and Margaretting Road go through the common.
