= Brickfield and Long Meadow =

Park in Essex, United Kingdom

Coordinates: 51.924°N 0.70064°E

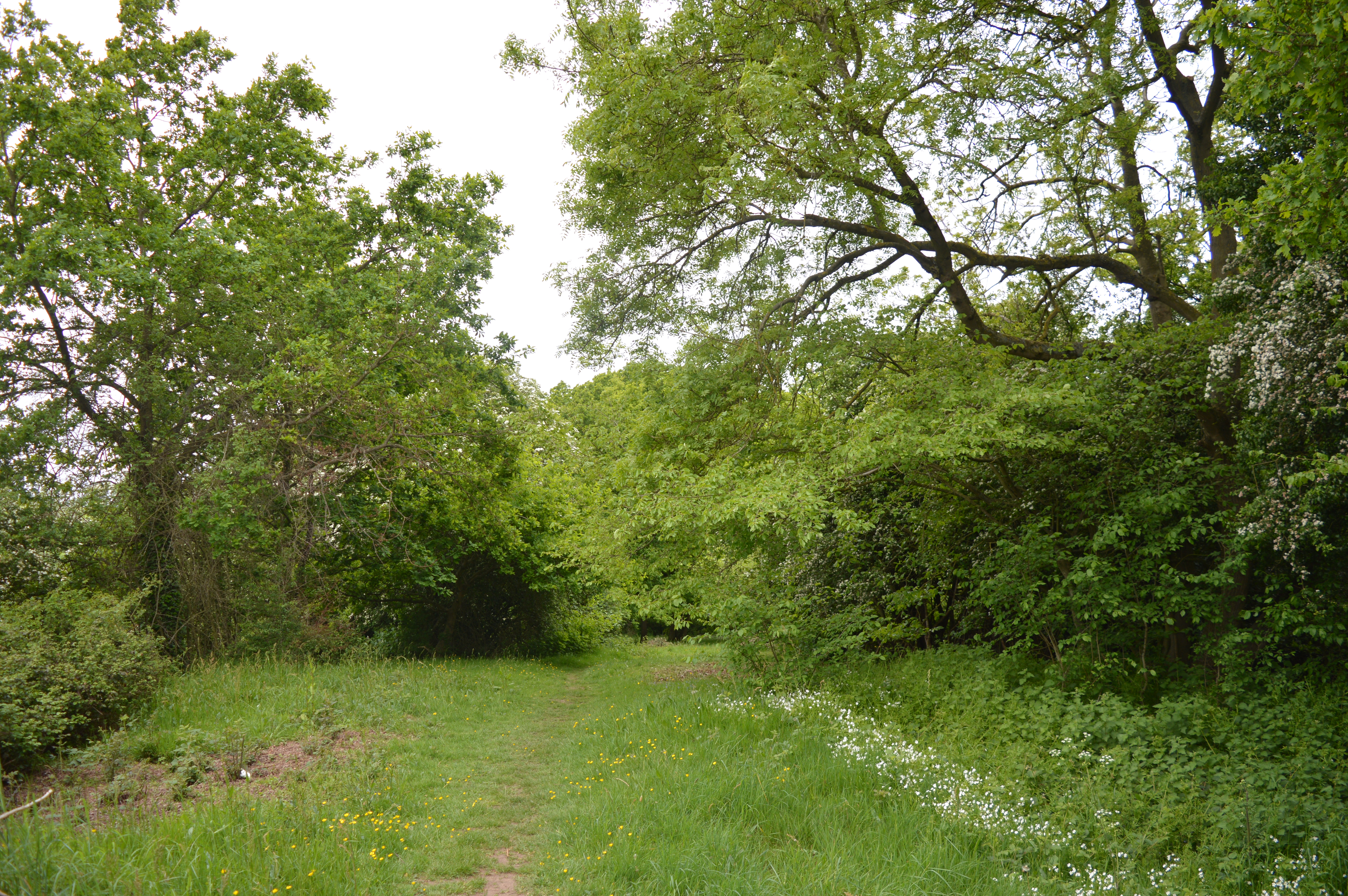
- Interactive map of Brickfield and Long Meadow
- Type: Local Nature Reserve
- Location: Earls Colne, Essex
- OS grid: TL858285
- Area: 3.9 hectares (9.6 acres)
- Manager: Ashwells Amenity and Pleasure Ground Trust

Brickfield and Long Meadow is a 3.9 hectare Local Nature Reserve in Earls Colne in Essex, England.

There is access by footpaths from Park Lane, Church Hill and the Coggeshall Road.

The site was donated by the Hunt family by a Conveyance and Trust Deed dated 20 January 1987.

The Brickfield gained its name when it was used for stacking bricks made at nearby Tilekiln Farm.

As stated in the Natural England Designated Sites entry the Brickfield is a place where hundreds of anthills may be seen, which requires management of the site.

The site was once used by the local monastery to house its fishponds, the largest of which was in the Long Meadow.
