= Linford Wood =

Wood in Thurrock, Essex, England

Coordinates: 51.4905°N 0.4127°E

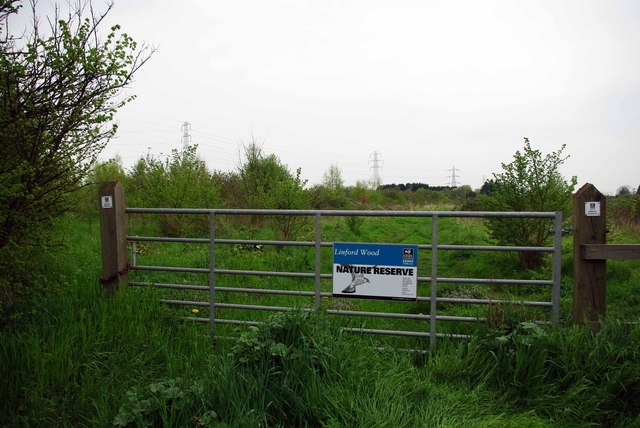
- Interactive map of Linford Wood
- Type: Local Nature Reserve
- Location: East Tilbury, Essex
- OS grid: TQ676796
- Area: 3.5 hectares (8.6 acres)
- Manager: Thurrock Council

Linford Wood is a 3.5-hectare (8.6-acre) Local Nature Reserve in Linford in Thurrock, Essex. It is owned and managed by Thurrock Council.

The site has mixed woodland, a willow plantation, hedges, ditches and an open area. Birds include tawny owls, great spotted woodpeckers and green woodpeckers. It is part of the Thurrock Thameside Nature Park.

There is access from East Tilbury Road.
