= Jacks Hatch =

Hamlet in Essex, England

Coordinates: 51.7393°N 0.0750684°E

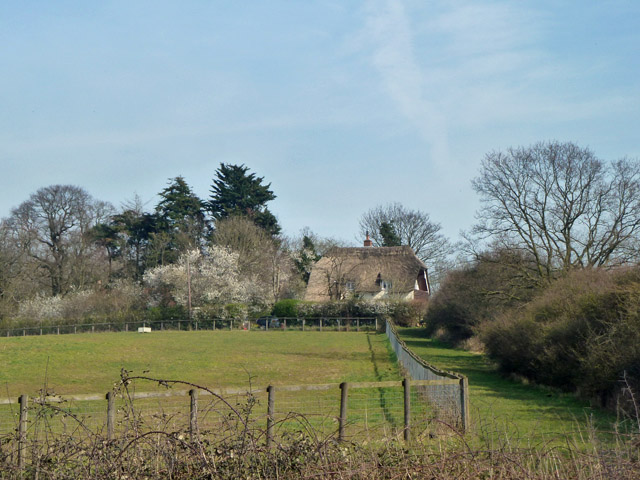
- Little Canons Farm, Jacks Hatch

- Location within Essex
- OS grid reference: TL433065
- Civil parish: Epping Upland
- District: Epping Forest
- Shire county: Essex
- Region: East
- Country: England
- Sovereign state: United Kingdom
- Post town: Harlow
- Postcode district: CM16
- Dialling code: 01992
- Police: Essex
- Fire: Essex
- Ambulance: East of England
- UK Parliament: Epping Forest

Jacks Hatch (also spelt Jack's Hatch), is a hamlet in the Epping Upland civil parish of the Epping Forest district of Essex, England.

Jacks Hatch is 1.75 miles (3 km) north-west from the parish village of Epping Upland, 2 miles (3 km) south-southwest from the town centre of Harlow and 17 miles (27 km) west from the city and county town of Chelmsford. It is on the B181 Epping road between Epping Green village at the south, and Broadley Common in Roydon at the north-west, and centred on the junction with Parsloe Road running north-east to the almost conjoined Kingsmoor area of southern Harlow. Junction 7 of the M11 motorway is 4.5 miles (7 km) to the east.

The Hamlet may have been referenced as Cerlen hacce in the confirmatory charter of Edward the Confessor to the church of Waltham Holy Cross in 1062.

While the Hamlet lies within the civil parish of Epping Upland, it lies within the ecclesiastical parishes of Nazeing and Great Parndon - the boundary between them lying along the Epping Green Road (B181).

The hamlet and its immediate surrounding area includes three farms. There are two small retail and light industrial areas on Parslow Road which include a car sales and a furniture sales outlet, and a hair salon. Detached and semidetached houses line Parsloe Road, and the Epping Road chiefly at its west side. At the junction is a fuel station which includes an automotive repair centre.

The 1933 Kelly's Directory of Essex listed a motor engineers company at Jacks Hatch.

On Parsloe Road at Jacks Hatch is the Grade II listed Richmonds Farmhouse, a rendered timber-framed T-plan house with a 17th-century gable, dating at least from the early 16th century.

In the 2010s Epping Upland Parish Council began working towards a Neighbourhood Plan for the protection of parish character which, if approved, would become part of planning policy under an Epping Forest District Council Local Plan. The area of Jacks Hatch was to be removed from the protection of this Local Plan, allowing further southward expansion of the Harlow conurbation. A possible greater expansion of Harlow attached development south to the edge of Epping Upland village, and in green belt, was being considered through the Epping Forest District Council Local Plan, but opposed by the Parish Council for its Neighbourhood Plan.

Jacks Hatch lies in the UK parliamentary constituency of Epping Forest. The sitting MP since 1997 has been Eleanor Laing.
