= Wraight =

Wraight is a surname. Notable people with the surname include:

- Gary Wraight (born 1979), English footballer
- Megan Wraight (1961–2020), New Zealand landscape architect

== See also ==
- Dolly Walker-Wraight (1920–2002), British schoolteacher and writer
- Wright
