= Epping Upland =

Village in Essex, England

Coordinates: 51.7210°N 0.089699°E

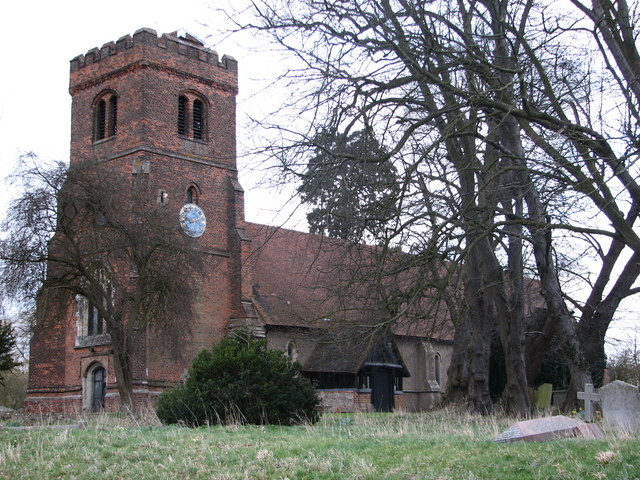
- All Saints' Church, Epping Upland

- Location within Essex
- Population: 944 (Parish, 2021)
- OS grid reference: TL444045
  - London: 15 mi (24 km) SSW
- District: Epping Forest
- Shire county: Essex
- Region: East
- Country: England
- Sovereign state: United Kingdom
- Post town: EPPING
- Postcode district: CM16
- Dialling code: 01992
- Police: Essex
- Fire: Essex
- Ambulance: East of England
- UK Parliament: Epping Forest

Epping Upland, is a village and civil parish in the Epping Forest district of Essex, England. The parish was created in 1896 from the rural part of the older parish of Epping, with All Saints' Church at Epping Upland having been the original parish church of Epping. The parish also includes the village of Epping Green. At the 2021 census the parish had a population of 944.

The village is situated on the B181 road, approximately 3 miles (5 km) south of the town of Harlow, and 2 miles (3 km) north-west of the town of Epping and the M11 motorway.

Epping Upland parish church is dedicated to All Saints, and the Epping Upland ecclesiastical parish forms part of the Diocese of Chelmsford. The church dates to the 13th century and is Grade II* listed.

Until the Dissolution of the Monasteries, All Saints was under the jurisdiction of Waltham Abbey. All Saints' Church was the parish church of Epping, but the settlement around the church remained very small. The main settlements in the parish came to be Epping Green at the northern end of the parish and the town of Epping, sometimes historically called Epping Street, at the southern end of the parish. The parish was subdivided for certain purposes into an Epping Street division covering the town at the southern end of the parish, and an Epping Upland division covering the remainder. In 1831, the Epping Upland division of the parish had a population of 427 within 83 houses. At the time, eighty per cent of Epping Upland's population, and forty per cent of the parish, were employed in agriculture.

A chapel of ease existed at Epping town from at least the 14th century, dedicated to St John the Baptist. In 1889, the two churches' roles were reversed, with St John's being redesignated the parish church and All Saints being downgraded to being a chapel of ease. All Saints was restored to being a parish church again in 1912 when Epping Upland became a separate ecclesiastical parish from Epping.

In civil terms, the parish of Epping was split in 1896. The southern part around Epping town became a separate urban district, also taking in areas from the neighbouring parishes of Theydon Garnon and Theydon Bois. The remainder of the old parish of Epping, covering Epping Green and the rural parts of the old parish as well as the small settlement around All Saints' Church, became a separate civil parish called Epping Upland.

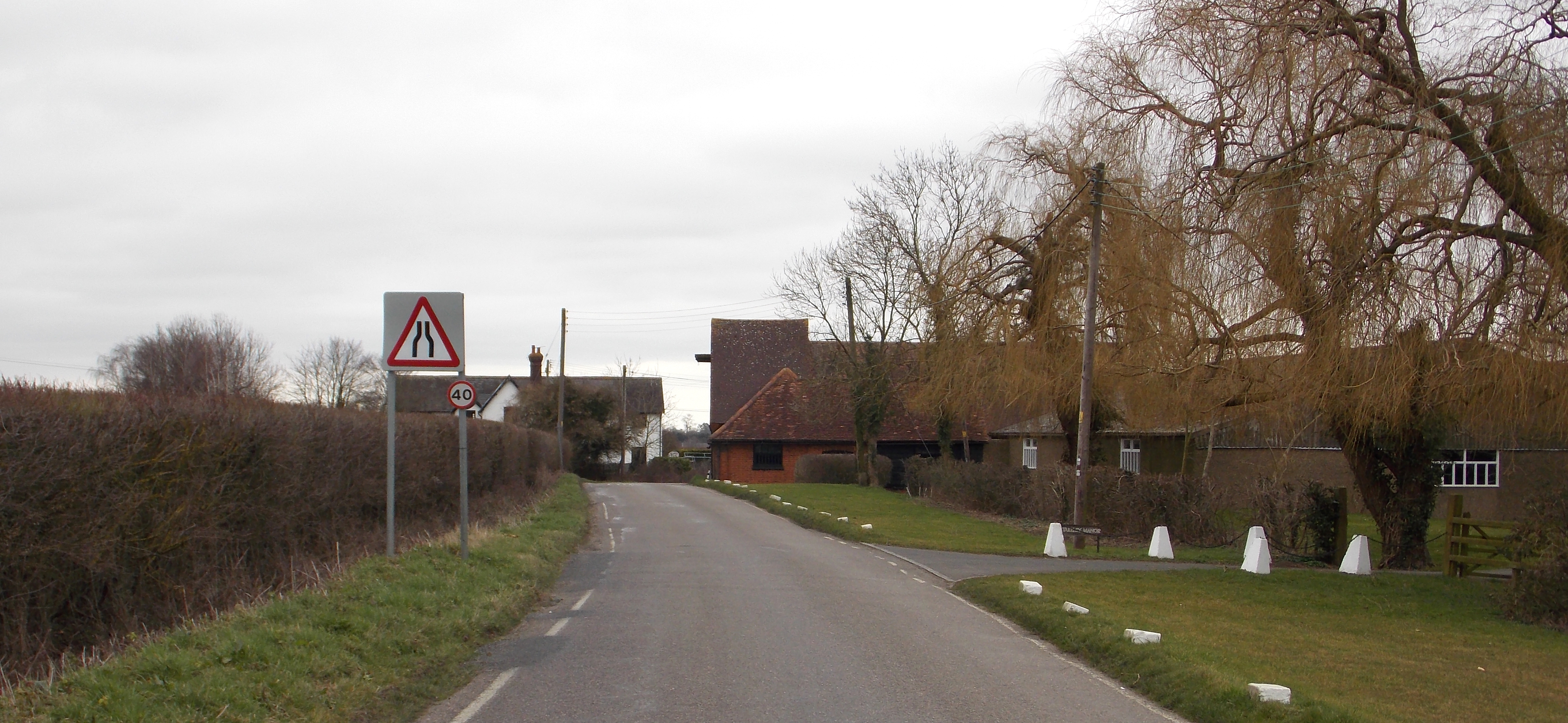
Upland Road towards Takeleys

Listed buildings in Epping Upland include Takeleys, a Grade II timber-framed house, as part of a moated site, which dates to the 16th century (Pevsner: early 17th), with 18th-century alterations. It contains an "elaborately carved" chimney piece and, in an upper room, 17th-century brown and black wall paintings in floral style on plasterwork.

On 8 September 1944, during the Second World War, the first German V-2 rocket to be launched landed at Epping Upland.

The local primary school is Epping Upland C of E Primary School.

Epping Upland has bus services to Epping and Harlow.

== All Saints Church ==
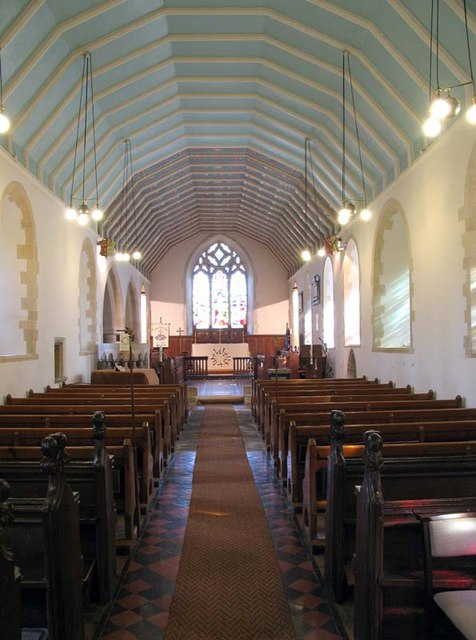
All Saints Church looking east from the nave.

The church is probably 13th century in origin, a piscina in the nave survives from that period. The south porch is 15th century and the red brick west tower is from the late 16th century. Five early 16th century benches with poppyheads survive in the nave. The building was heavily restored in 1876-78 by James Brooks, who added a vestry and organ chamber on either side of the chancel. A carved reredos of 1913 by Harry Hems depicts the Last Supper. It is a Grade II* listed building. It is an active church with weekly Sunday services and strong links to Epping Upland Primary School.

== Civil parish ==
Epping Upland civil parish stretches from the southern outskirts of Harlow in the north to the M25 motorway in the south, a distance of approximately 5 miles (8 km), and a distance of 3 miles west of Thornwood Common in the east. The village of Epping Green and the hamlets of Jacks Hatch and Rye Hill are situated just inside the northern edge of the civil parish.

At the 2021 census, the parish had a population of 944. The population had been 831 in 2011, and 790 in 2001.

The parish includes the earthwork remains of the scheduled Ambresbury Banks, an Iron Age hill fort.
