= Epping Green, Essex =

Village in Essex, England

Coordinates: 51.7283°N 0.0773°E

Epping Green
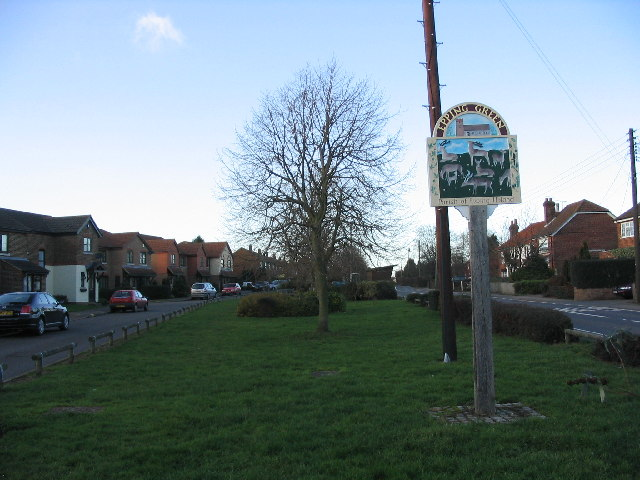
- Epping Green

- Location within Essex
- OS grid reference: TL435052
  - London: 15 mi (24 km) SSW
- Civil parish: Epping Upland
- District: Epping Forest
- Shire county: Essex
- Region: East
- Country: England
- Sovereign state: United Kingdom
- Post town: EPPING
- Postcode district: CM16
- Dialling code: 01992
- Police: Essex
- Fire: Essex
- Ambulance: East of England
- UK Parliament: Epping Forest

Epping Green is a village in the civil parish of Epping Upland and Epping Forest district of Essex, England, situated on the B181 road between Epping and Harlow.

The parish of Epping Upland, which stretches from the Wake Arms public house near Upshire at the south to the outskirts of Harlow at the north, takes in part of Thornwood Common at the east, and the hamlet of Rye Hill. Epping Green lies mainly within Epping Forest land although most farmland is owned by Copped Hall Estates and leased to the local farmers.

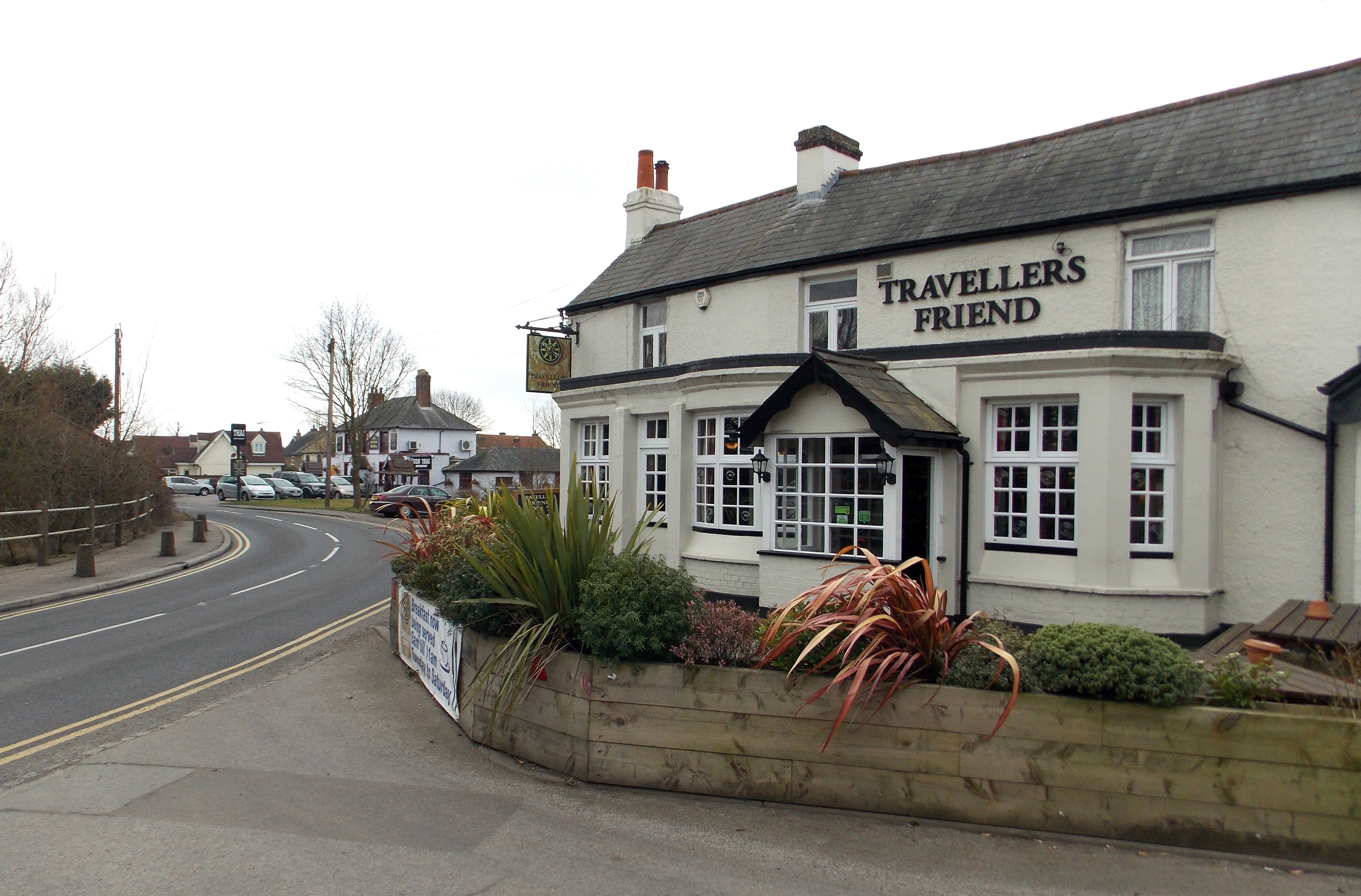
Epping Green’s now-closed public houses

Through the village are ancient market routes and cattle drover's lanes, which were routes from as far afield as Norfolk. The traditional village pond was originally a blacksmith's cooling pond. Following the closure of the combined post office and village store around 1996, the closure of the Cock & Magpie public house around 2018 and the decision by the long-standing owner to put the remaining pub, The Traveller's Friend, up for sale in 2021, the village has lost its remaining commercial amenities. The 13th-century parish church of All Saints' at Epping Upland, less than 1 mile (1.6 km) to the south-east, serves Epping Green, and was the original Epping church before St John's was built.

Between the 1920s and 1940s Epping Green consisted chiefly of wooden cottages built along a country road.

== Education ==
The village has its own Church of England primary school, Epping Upland Church of England Primary School.

== Transport ==
=== Bus ===
Route number	Route	Notes
31	Coopersale to Harlow Bus Station via Epping, Epping Green, Roydon	Mon-Sat
