= John Archer (judge) =

English judge

Sir John Archer
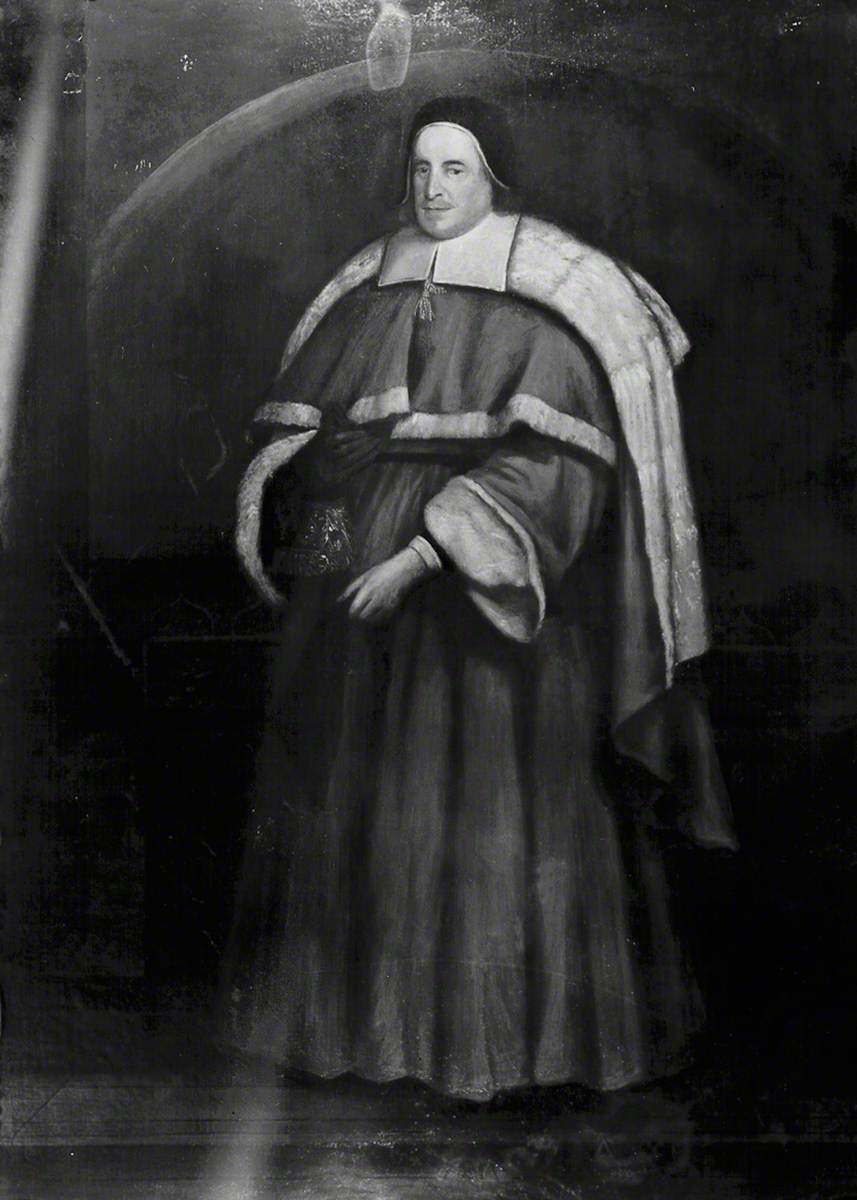
- Born: 1598
- Died: 1682 (aged 83–84)
- Resting place: Theydon Garnon, Essex
- Education: Queens' College, Cambridge; Gray's Inn
- Occupation: Judge
- Spouses: Mary Savile; Eleanor Curson
- Children: 1

Sir John Archer (1598–1682) was an English judge.

== Early life and education ==
Archer was the son of Henry Archer, Esq., of Coopersale, Theydon Garnon, Essex, by Anne, daughter of Simon Crouch, of London, alderman. He was educated at Queens' College, Cambridge, where he graduated B.A. in 1619, and M.A. in 1622. Having entered Gray's Inn as a student in 1617, he was called to the bar in 1620.

== Career ==
He appears to have risen very slowly in his profession, as his name is not mentioned by any of the reporters of the time of Charles I. Edward Foss states that 'in 1647 he was selected as counsel for the corporation of Grantham,' but cites no authority; and the corporation of Grantham does not appear as a party to any case reported in that year. In 1651 he was assigned by the court as one of the counsel for Christopher Love on his trial for high treason in plotting with the Scots to bring about the restoration of the monarchy; but exception was taken to Archer on the ground that he had not subscribed the engagement to be true to the commonwealth, as required by a resolution of the House of Commons passed on 11 October 1649, to be subscribed by public functionaries 'and by' all sergeants at law, counsellors, officers, ministers, and clerks, and all attorneys and solicitors.'

As Archer had not subscribed, and at the trial declined to subscribe, this engagement, he was not allowed to plead. Whether he subsequently did so does not appear; but in 1656 he was returned to parliament, and his name does not appear in the list of the excluded members. On 27 November 1658 he was made a Serjeant, the appointment being confirmed by Charles II on 1 June 1660; but his elevation to the bench, which had occurred in the interim (15 May 1659), was thereby tacitly annulled. On 4 November 1663 he was made a justice of the common bench in succession to Sir Robert Hide (then raised to the chief justiceship of the same bench), and knighted. As a judge he travelled the western circuit with Sir J. Kelyng. His name occurs in the list of the judges who attended the meeting of the bench summoned in 1666 to confer upon the proper course to be taken in view of the impending trial of Lord Morley for murder by the House of Lords, a case still cited as an authority upon the distinction between murder and manslaughter. Archer is characterised by Roger North as one 'of whose abilities time hath kept no record unless in the sinister way,' as uncertain in his law and afraid of a long and intricate cause. He appears, however, to have held decided and sound opinions on the construction of his own patent; for when the king in the winter of 1661 attempted to remove him from his office he stood stoutly upon his right to hold it on the terms of the patent, 'quamdiu se bene gesserit,' and refused to surrender the patent without a writ of scire facias, the proper legal mode of procedure to annul a royal grant; but which was so little to the taste of the king that Archer continued, until his death, legally justice of the common bench, and in receipt of his salary as such, though relieved by royal prohibition from the performance of the duties of the office, which were discharged by Sir William Ellis.

== Personal life ==
Archer married Mary, daughter of Sir George Savile, Bart., of Thornhill, Yorkshire, by whom he does not appear to have had any children. He later married Eleanor (Curzon), daughter to Sir John Curson, Baronet of Kedleston, Derbyshire, by whom he had one child, John, who died without issue, 7 November 1706, having by his will left the Coopersale estate in Essex to William Eyre of Gray's Inn, on condition that he married Eleanora Wrottesley (a niece of the testator), daughter to Sir Walter Wrottesley, 3rd Baronet, and assumed the name of Archer, which happened in due course. The Archers traced their descent from one Simon de Bois, who came to England with the Conqueror, of whom a namesake and lineal descendant changed his name to Archer at the bidding of Henry V on the occasion of a shooting match at Havering-atte-Bower, in which he displayed the same skill as had formerly done the king good service at Agincourt, the king at the same time granting him a pension of five marks yearly. There are some inaccuracies in Foss's account of Archer's parentage.

Archer died in 1682, and was buried in Theydon Garnon churchyard, where a monument was raised to his memory.
