= Fiddlers Hamlet =

Hamlet in Essex, England

Coordinates: 51.6889°N 0.1308°E

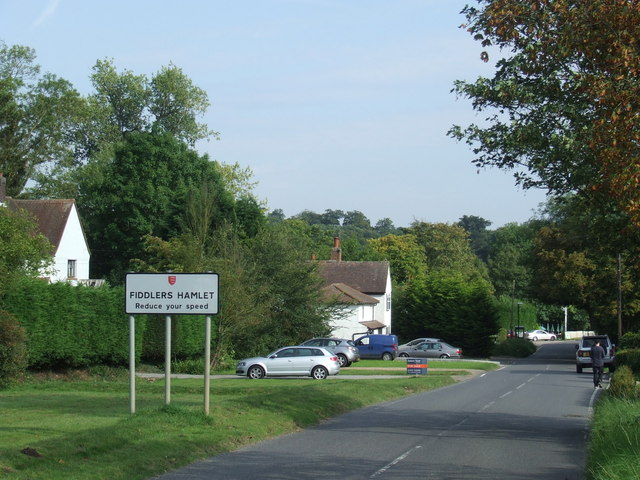
- Fiddlers Hamlet road sign

- Location within Essex
- OS grid reference: TL 473010
  - London: 16 mi (26 km) SW
- Civil parish: Epping
- District: Epping Forest
- Shire county: Essex
- Region: East
- Country: England
- Sovereign state: United Kingdom
- Post town: Epping
- Postcode district: CM16
- Police: Essex
- Fire: Essex
- Ambulance: East of England
- UK Parliament: Epping Forest constituency

Fiddlers Hamlet is a hamlet in the civil parish of Epping, within the Epping Forest District of Essex, England, and is 1 mile (1.6 km) south-east from the market town of Epping, separated by farm and fields. The M11 motorway runs 300 yards (274 m) to the east, with Junction 7 for Harlow being 4 miles (6 km) to the north.

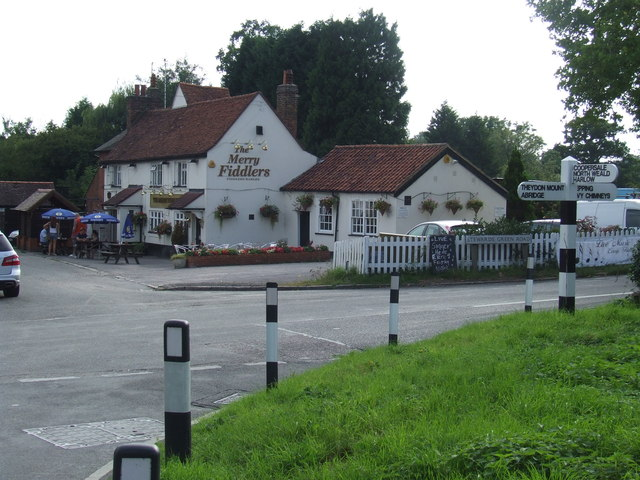
The Merry Fiddlers

The hamlet is at the junction of Stewards Green Road where it becomes Mount Road (to Theydon Mount), and Coopersale Street (road) which runs 800 yards (700 m) due north to the hamlet of Coopersale Street. The village of Coopersale is less than 1 mile to the north.

Fiddlers Hamlet takes its name from the Merry Fiddlers Inn, and has been a settlement since at least the 17th century. It was previously in the parish of Theydon Garnon. Fiddlers Hamlet was part of the Epping Union, poor relief provision set up under the Poor Law Amendment Act 1834. In the 19th century the hamlet was seen as within the identifiable Coopersale northern district of Theydon Garnon parish, which itself had become a separate ecclesiastical parish in 1852 as part of the rural deanery of Chigwell. In 1896, the north-western parts of Theydon Garnon parish, including Fiddlers Hamlet, Coopersale Street, and Coopersale, were transferred the newly-created Epping Urban District.

The local school is Coopersale and Theydon Garnon Church of England Primary School in Coopersale. The previous school at Fiddlers Hamlet was that for Theydon Garnon parish; the old school house still exists. The Merry Fiddlers public house is at the centre of the hamlet, and is listed as the Merry Fiddlers in 19th- and early 20th-century trade directories, and as being the location of the hamlet post box. In the late 19th century, letters to the hamlet were delivered from Epping by foot.

There are six Grade II listed buildings in Fiddlers Hamlet. Masons Bridge Farmhouse is at the south of the hamlet below the Merry Fiddlers, and is a timber-framed, jettied and pargetted building dating probably to the 15th century. Ancillary buildings to the farmhouse are a timber-framed and weatherboarded outbuilding dating to the 17th or 18th century, and a 17th-century timber-framed barn which is partly plastered and partly weatherboarded. On Home Farm at the north of the hamlet on Coopersale Street road are three listed farm buildings: a timber-framed and weatherboarded barn with a half-hipped tiled roof which dates to the mid-16th-century; an early 19th-century timber-framed and weatherboarded granary; and a courtyard farm building dating to the 16th century, of previously indeterminate use, timber-framed and weatherboarded, with a hipped roof.

A now nonexistent timber-framed house called Gardners, recorded extant in 1956 and .75 miles (1 km) south-west from the hamlet, part dated to the 15th century, with a 16th-century roof, a 17th-century staircase and 16th-century panelling.
