= Coopersale Street =

Hamlet in Essex, England

Coordinates: 51.695°N 0.1318°E

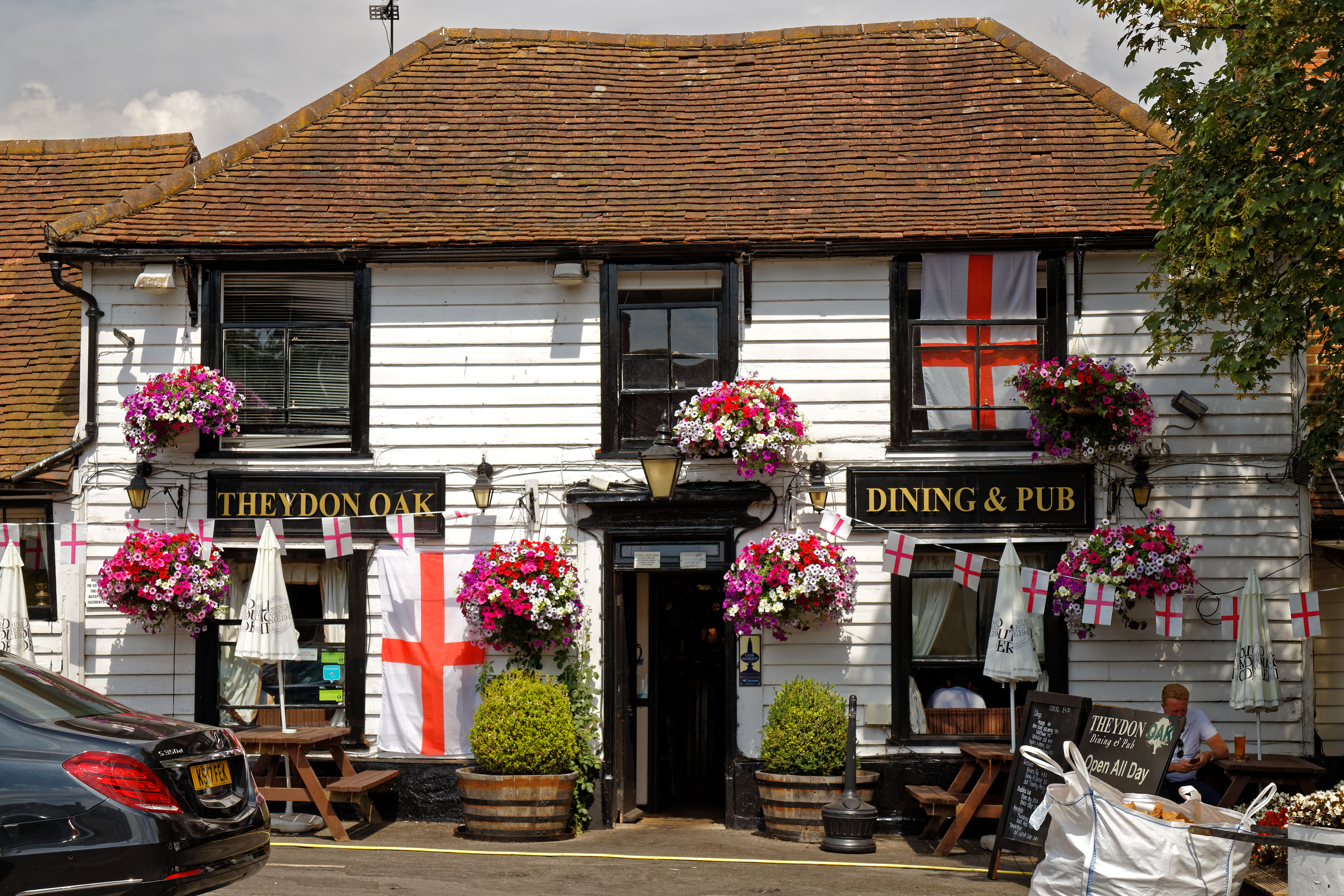
- Theydon Oak public house, Coopersale Street

- Location within Essex
- OS grid reference: TL474017
  - London: 17 mi (27 km) SW
- Civil parish: Epping
- District: Epping Forest
- Shire county: Essex
- Region: East
- Country: England
- Sovereign state: United Kingdom
- Post town: Epping
- Postcode district: CM16
- Police: Essex
- Fire: Essex
- Ambulance: East of England
- UK Parliament: Epping Forest constituency

Coopersale Street is a hamlet in the civil parish of Epping, within the Epping Forest District of Essex, England, and is 1,300 yards (1,000 m) east from the market town of Epping, separated by farm and fields. The M11 motorway runs 600 yards (500 m) to the east, with Junction 7 for Harlow being 3.5 miles (6 km) to the north.

The hamlet is at the junction of Stonards Hill where it becomes Coopersale Street (road), and Houblons Hill which runs north to the village of Coopersale. The hamlet of Fiddlers Hamlet is 750 yards (700 m) to the south.

Coopersale Street has been a hamlet since at least the 18th century, witnessed by a 1777 map of Chapman and André, and was previously in the parish of Theydon Garnon. The hamlet was part of the Epping Union, poor relief provision set up under the Poor Law Amendment Act 1834. In the 19th century it was seen as within the identifiable Coopersale northern district of Theydon Garnon parish, which itself had become a separate ecclesiastical parish in 1852 as part of the rural deanery of Chigwell. In 1896 the north-western parts of Theydon Garnon parish including Coopersale Street, Coopersale and Fiddlers Hamlet were transferred to become part of the newly created Epping Urban District.

In trade directories Coopersale Street occupations, including farmers and tradesmen, are listed as such under Coopersale, as is Coopersale Street post office which served the northern area of Theydon Garnon parish. The hamlet was occasionally separately defined under a sub-heading, where in 1894 a Coopersale Street beer retailer and a woman who undertook hand laundry were listed, and in 1933 a married woman who traded as a beer retailer.

The local school is Coopersale and Theydon Garnon Church of England Primary School in Coopersale. The hamlet public house is the Theydon Oak.

There are five Grade II listed buildings in Coopersale Street. At the centre of the hamlet is the Theydon Oak Inn, a weatherboarded and hipped roof public house dating to the 18th century. At the west is Dover Court, a weatherboarded house, previously a hall house. Opposite the Theydon Oak is a timber framed and weather boarded barn and an originally two-storey timber-framed house dating to the late 16th or early 17th centuries. At the east is Coopersale Lodge, a mid-15th-century two-storey timber-framed and plastered house with late 16th-century additions; an annex to this building was previously the post office.

In 2013 the model and TV personality Penny Lancaster opened the Theydon Oak pub's new children's play facilities; Lancaster's husband Rod Stewart considers the Theydon Oak as his local public house when in Epping, especially at Christmastime. The pub won the 2016 East London and West Essex Guardian Food Awards in the Best Public House category.
