= Gernon Bushes =

Nature reserve in Essex, England

Coordinates: 51.706°N 0.138°E

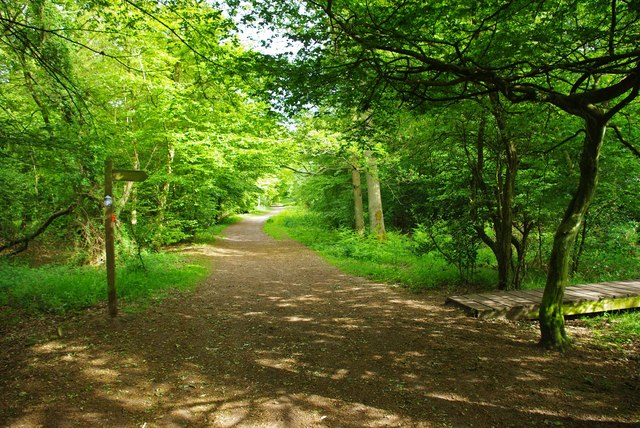
- Interactive map of Gernon Bushes
- Type: Nature reserve
- Location: Epping, Essex
- OS grid: TL 478 030
- Area: 32 hectares (79 acres)
- Manager: Essex Wildlife Trust

Gernon Bushes is a 32 hectare nature reserve north-east of Epping in Essex, England, which is managed by the Essex Wildlife Trust. It is part of the Epping Forest Site of Special Scientific Interest and Nature Conservation Review site.

This site is ancient coppice, with old hornbeam pollards, and many ponds which were formerly created for gravel extraction. There are areas of marsh with large patches of the unusual marsh fern, and other plants include marsh marigold and ragged robin.

The site lies east of Coopersale village and can be accessed from there.
