= Gary Wraight =

English footballer

Personal information
- Full name: Gary Paul Wraight
- Date of birth: 5 March 1979 (age 47)
- Place of birth: Epping, England
- Position: Midfielder

Youth career
- Wycombe Wanderers

Senior career*
Years	Team	Apps	(Gls)
1997–1999	Wycombe Wanderers	7	(0)
1999–2001	Stevenage Borough	35	(3)
2001–2002	Chelmsford City	1	(0)
- Harlow Town
- * Club domestic league appearances and goals

Gary Paul Wraight (born 5 March 1979) is a former professional footballer who played as a midfielder.

== Career ==
Wraight began his career with Wycombe Wanderers. At Wycombe, Wraight made seven Football League appearances after progressing from the club's academy. Following his time at Wycombe, Wraight dropped into Non-League football, signing for Stevenage Borough in 1999. Wraight spent two years at the club, before joining Chelmsford City. Wraight made a single league appearance for Chelmsford during the 2001–02 season. Wraight later played for Harlow Town.
