= Theydon Garnon =

Village in Essex, England

Coordinates: 51.6722°N 0.1261°E

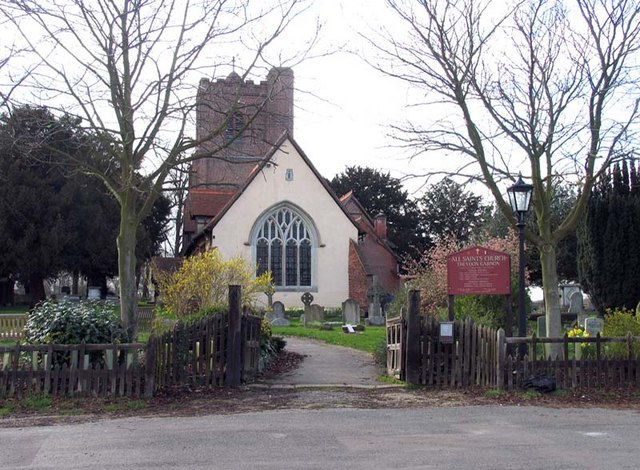
- All Saints Church

- Location within Essex
- Interactive map of Theydon Garnon
- Population: 172 (Parish, 2021)
- Civil parish: Theydon Garnon
- District: Epping Forest
- Shire county: Essex
- Region: East
- Country: England
- Sovereign state: United Kingdom
- Post town: EPPING
- Postcode district: CM16
- Dialling code: 01992
- Police: Essex
- Fire: Essex
- Ambulance: East of England

Theydon Garnon is a village and civil parish in the Epping Forest district of Essex, England, lying east and south of Epping parish. The parish includes the hamlet of Hobbs Cross. At the 2021 census the parish had a population of 172.

== History ==
Also recorded as Thoydon Garnon and Coopersale, "Theydon" is thought to mean 'valley where thatch (material) grows' and "Garnon" derives from the Gernon family. A weekly market and annual fair was granted to Theydon Garnon in 1305. A workhouse operated in the parish from around 1704.

By 1851 the parish's population had reached 1,237. Epping Union Workhouse was in Theydon Garnon; it and Epping station opened within the parish in 1865. This part of Theydon Garnon parish was transferred to the newly formed Epping Urban District in 1896, along with the village of Coopersale and the hamlets of Coopersale Street and Fiddler's Hamlet. The reduction in the parish's size led to a reduction in population, down to 317 in 1901.

== Amenities ==
The village has an Anglican parish church, dating back to the 13th century and dedicated to All Saints. A primary school part-bears the village's name, but is located in the village of Coopersale in the neighbouring Epping parish.

Gernon Bushes, a nature reserve managed by Essex Wildlife Trust, is in the north of the parish near Coopersale.

== Transport ==
Theydon Garnon is close to the M25/M11 interchange, but there is no access to either motorway. The parish has no railway station, the nearest being Epping tube station.

== Nearby settlements ==
Nearby settlements include the town of Epping, the large village of Theydon Bois, the small village of Theydon Mount and the hamlets of Hobbs Cross and Fiddlers Hamlet.
