= Coopersale =

Village in Essex, England

Coordinates: 51.702°N 0.1340°E

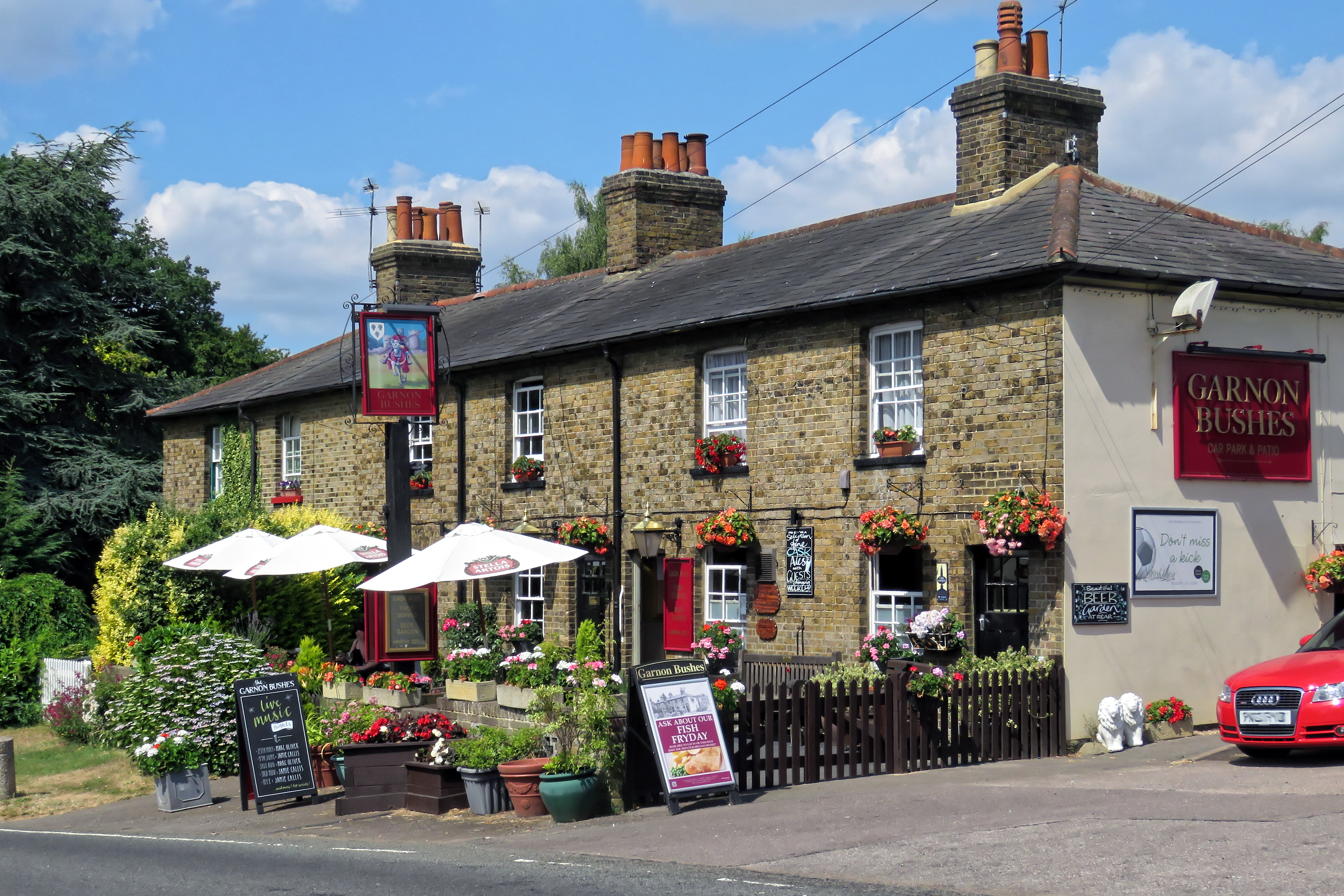
- Public house, Coopersale

- Location within Essex
- Area: 0.207 km^{2} (0.080 sq mi)
- Population: 1,050 (2024 estimate)
  - Density: 5,072/km^{2} (13,140/sq mi)
- OS grid reference: TL4702
  - London: 17 mi (27 km) SW
- Civil parish: Epping
- District: Epping Forest
- Shire county: Essex
- Region: East
- Country: England
- Sovereign state: United Kingdom
- Post town: Epping
- Postcode district: CM16
- Police: Essex
- Fire: Essex
- Ambulance: East of England
- UK Parliament: Epping Forest constituency

Coopersale, also termed Coopersale Common, is a village in the civil parish of Epping, within the Epping Forest District of Essex, England. In 2024 it had an estimated population of 1,050.

== History ==
In the 1870s the settlement of Theydon Garnon was alternatively referred to by the name 'Coopersale', and was a village 2 miles (3 km) south-southeast from Epping, centred between Coopersale House at the south of the present settlement and approximately the location of Fiddlers Hamlet further south. This dual naming of the village and parish had been prevalent since the late 1500s.

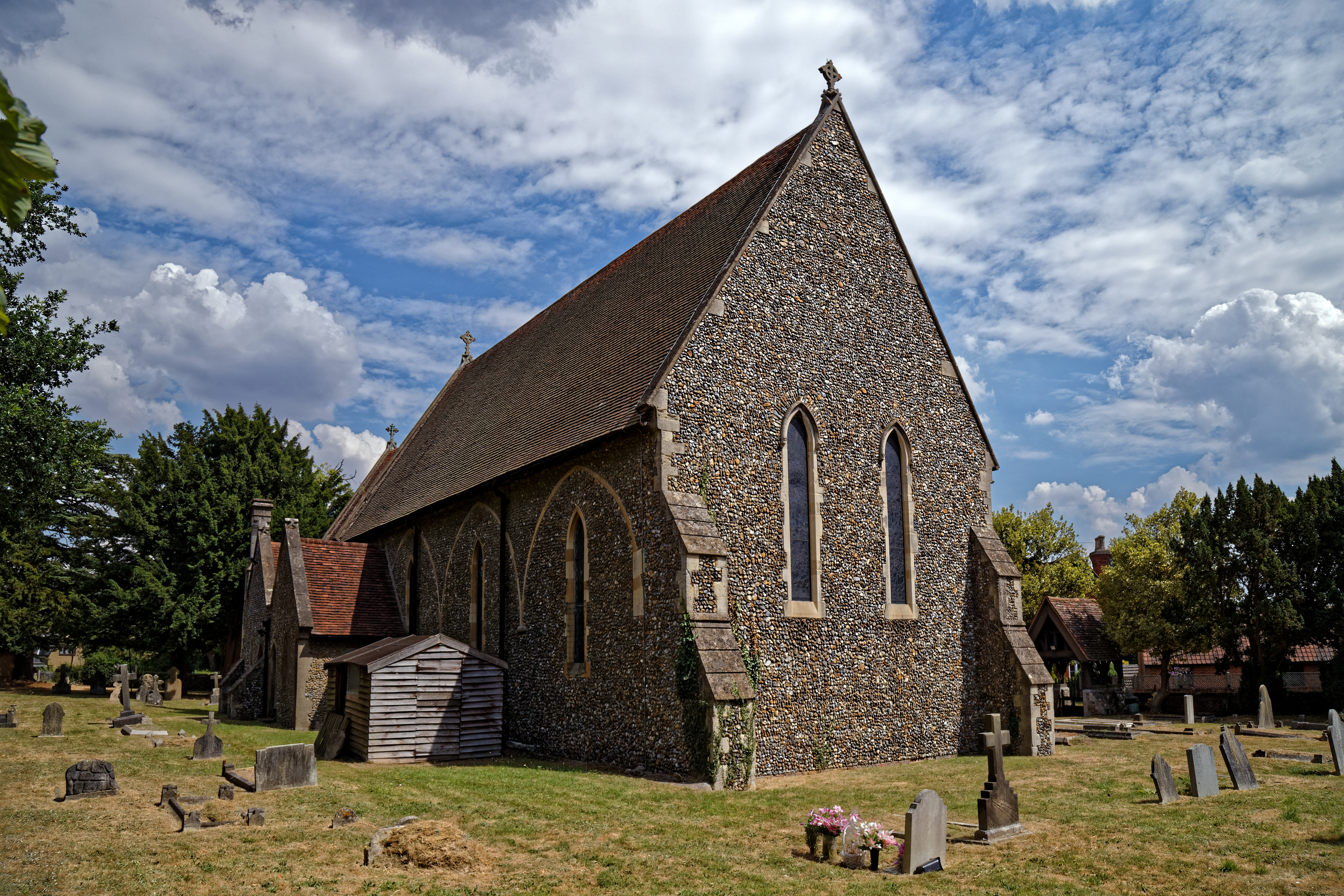
St Alban the Martyr's Church, Coopersale

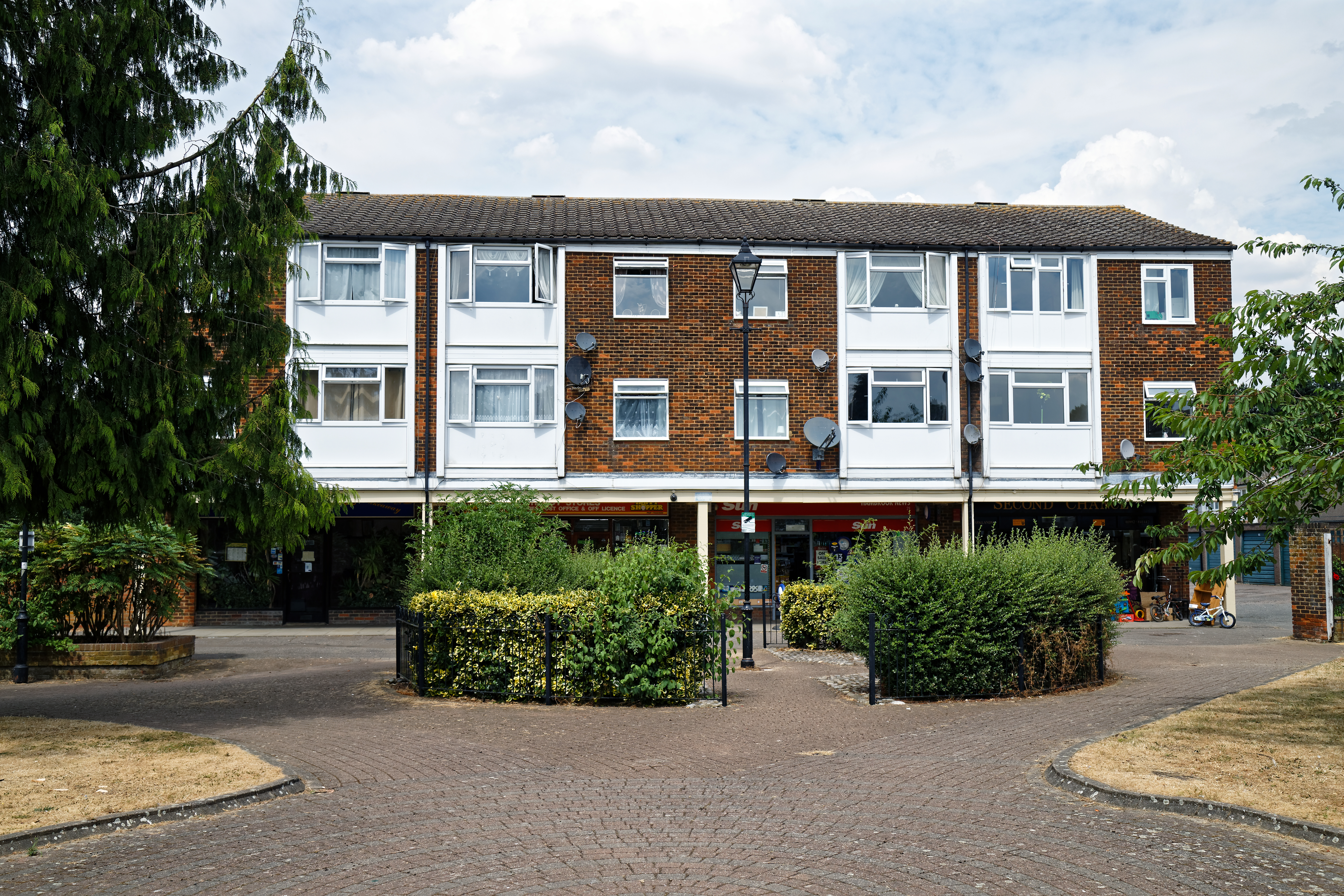
Parade of shops at Coopersale beside a small park

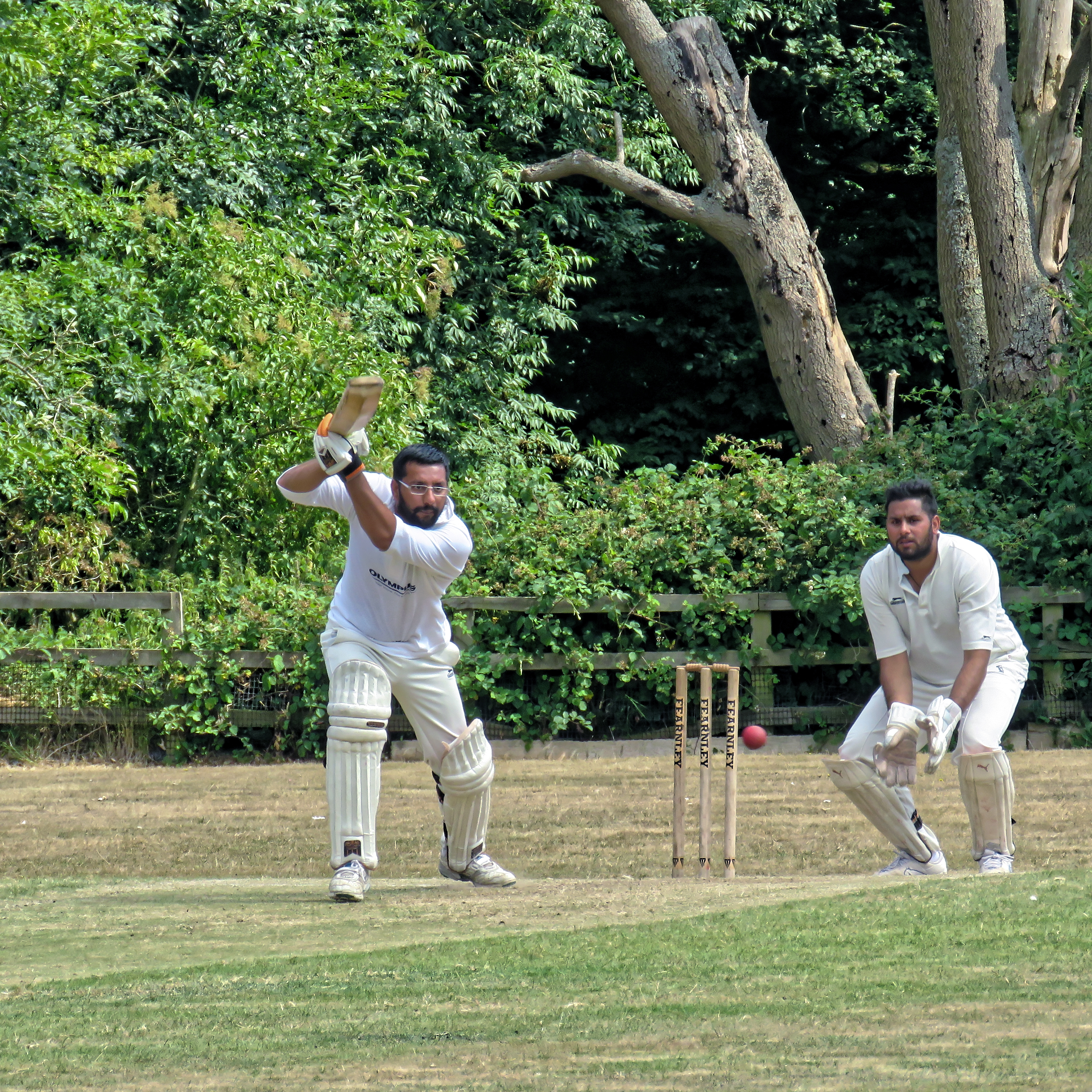
Cricket at Coopersale

In 1855 the place and parish name Coopersale was still interchangeable with Theydon Garnon, but by 1882 was subordinated as a part of Theydon Garnon civil parish with the Church of St Alban being described as a parish district church. By 1902, for civil purposes Coopersale, grouped with Coopersale Street, was part of Epping, but the ecclesiastical parish for rectorial purposes was still part of Theydon Garnon. By 1902 the village was in the Waltham Abbey county court district. Coopersale children attended school in Theydon Garnon village. The local post office was at Coopersale Street hamlet.

In 1896, the north-western parts of Theydon Garnon parish including Coopersale, Coopersale Street and Fiddlers Hamlet were transferred to become part of the newly-created Epping Urban District. Coopersale was part of the Epping Union—poor relief provision set up under the Poor Law Amendment Act 1834—which by 1912 provided for forty children a cottage home called Forest Side at Coopersale. Essex County Council ran the home after 1930 until it closed in 1960. The home, on Coopersale Common Road and 80 yards (70 m) north from St Alban's Church, was demolished and replaced by modern residences.

Between 1871 and 1911 Coopersale's population, as part of Theydon Garnon and later Epping, ranged between 638 and 672, although that in the ecclesiastical parish, always larger, was 760 in 1911. By 1921, the population had risen to 756. The area of the Coopersale district over these years approximated 600 acres, in which the chief crops grown were wheat, barley and beans.

Trades listed in 1894 included a hay dealer, a blacksmith, three builders, a brickmaker, a painter, a shopkeeper, two farmers, and two beer retailers one of whom was a butcher. By 1902, two farmers, a 'brickmaster', a painter, a blacksmith remained, as did two beer retailers, but one at Coopersale Street which seemed to be listed with Coopersale. Added occupations were a gardener, a wheelwright, a carpenter, a grocer & hardware dealer, a shopkeeper, a company of builders, and the surveyor to Epping Urban District Council. Further occupations in 1914 were an insurance agent, and at Coopersale Street a woman who undertook hand laundry. By 1933 occupations included a painter, an unmarried woman as beer retailer, two unmarried sisters running a shop, a married woman as beer retailer at Coopersale Street, a limited company building firm, and a farmer at Home Farm. Ansons farm is mentioned as occupied; this was the house where Samuel Phelps, English actor and theatre manager, died in 1878.

=== St Alban's Church ===
By the end of the 19th century Coopersale was seen as the identifiable northern district of Theydon Garnon parish, and itself had become a separate ecclesiastical parish in 1852 as part of the rural deanery of Chigwell, in the same year that St Alban's Church was built in Early English style. The church with its rectory was financed by Miss Harriet Archer-Houblon of Coopersale House as was the 1882 adjacent parish room. Miss Archer-Houblon's advowson provided for the church incumbency, which came with 5 acres (20,000 m^{2}) of glebe land. This patronage lay with the Archer-Houblon family until 1914, when it was transferred to the Bishop of Chelmsford.

St Alban's Church is described in trade directories as of flint, with a nave, south [actually south-east] porch, a west turret with one bell [no evidence of such today], and a chancel containing a credence, piscina and sedilia. Memorial windows are to the Houblon family and to Miss Archer-Houblon. There are 220 sittings for worshippers. A new lychgate was added to the churchyard in 1907, and an oak reredos to the chancel in 1913. The incumbency in 1874 was a vicarage, of a net value of £180 with 5 acres of glebe, in the gift of Miss Archer-Houblon. The area of glebe remained the same until at least 1914. The value of the vicarage was higher in 1902 at £285 in the gift of Colonel G. B. Archer-Houblon, and in 1914 at £280 in the gift of Captain H. L. Archer-Houblon.

=== Coopersale House ===
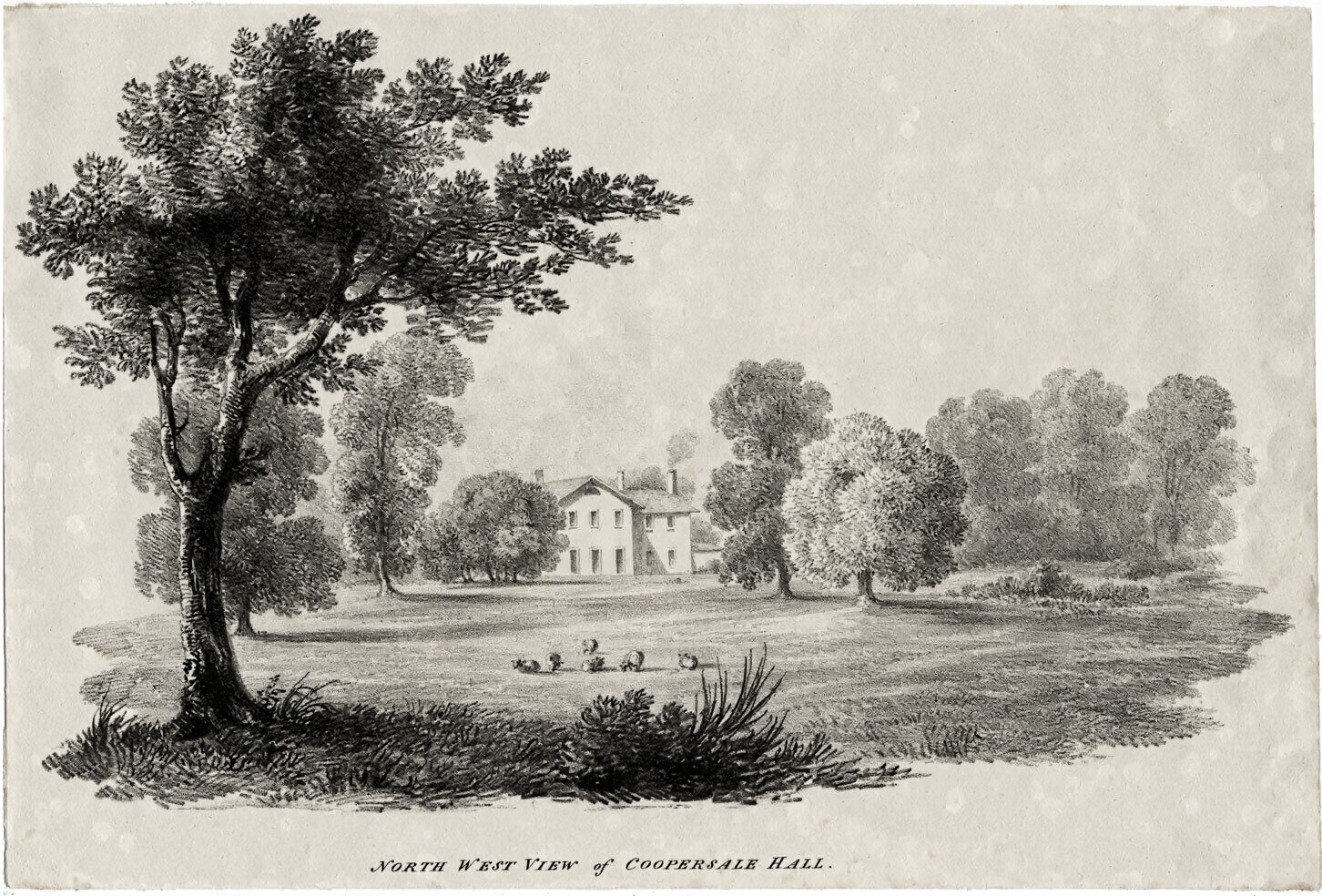
Coopersale Hall (House); early 19th century lithograph

Coopersale House, of "Tudor style", was the centre of an estate with grounds which were described as being "extensive and well arranged and contain a large sheet of water." An earlier house of John Archer (1598–1682), with an added late 17th-century wing, was rebuilt to a contemporary design in the early 18th century. The grounds were laid out for William Eyre Archer in the 1730s to the design of Adam Holt, the gardener of Wanstead Park, accommodated by the diversion of the public road of Houblons Hill away from the house. Later in the century Capability Brown provided design plans for the grounds which weren't carried out. The estate had been held by the Archer (later Archer-Houblon) family since the time of Henry V who changed the name of his Agincourt attendant Simon Dubois to Archer after Dubois performed well in an archery contest at Havering-atte-Bower. In 1914 Coopersale House was listed as unoccupied. The Archer-Houblon family sold the house and estate in 1914 and it remains in private ownership. In 1949 Historic England gave Coopersale House a Grade II listing.

William (Eyre) Archer (4 June 1677 – 30 June 1739) of Coopersale was Tory MP for Berkshire from 1734 to 1739. In 1706 Archer, son to William Eyre of Holme Hall, Derbyshire, took the name of 'Archer' after he succeeded to the Coopersale House and Welford Park, Berkshire estates of John Archer (died 1706), following his marriage to John Archer's niece Eleanor Wrottesley, daughter to Sir Walter Wrottesley, 3rd Baronet.

== Governance ==
Coopersale is in the Epping Hemnall ward of Epping Forest District. It is represented in parliament as part of the Epping Forest constituency. The sitting MP for the constituency (since 2024) is Neil Hudson.

== Geography ==
Coopersale is centred on the north-south conjoined roads of Coopersale Common Road and Houblons Hill, and is 1,000 yards (900 m) east from the market town of Epping, separated by forest land. The M11 motorway runs 700 yards (600 m) to the east, with Junction 7 for Harlow lying 2 miles (3 km) to the north. The village is essentially a linear settlement of 1,200 yards (1,000 m), with 19th-century and modern sideways expansion of residential and commercial properties at the north.

South from Coopersale are the Epping parish hamlets of Coopersale Street, conjoined, and Fiddlers Hamlet at 1,500 yards (1,000 m).

== Amenities ==
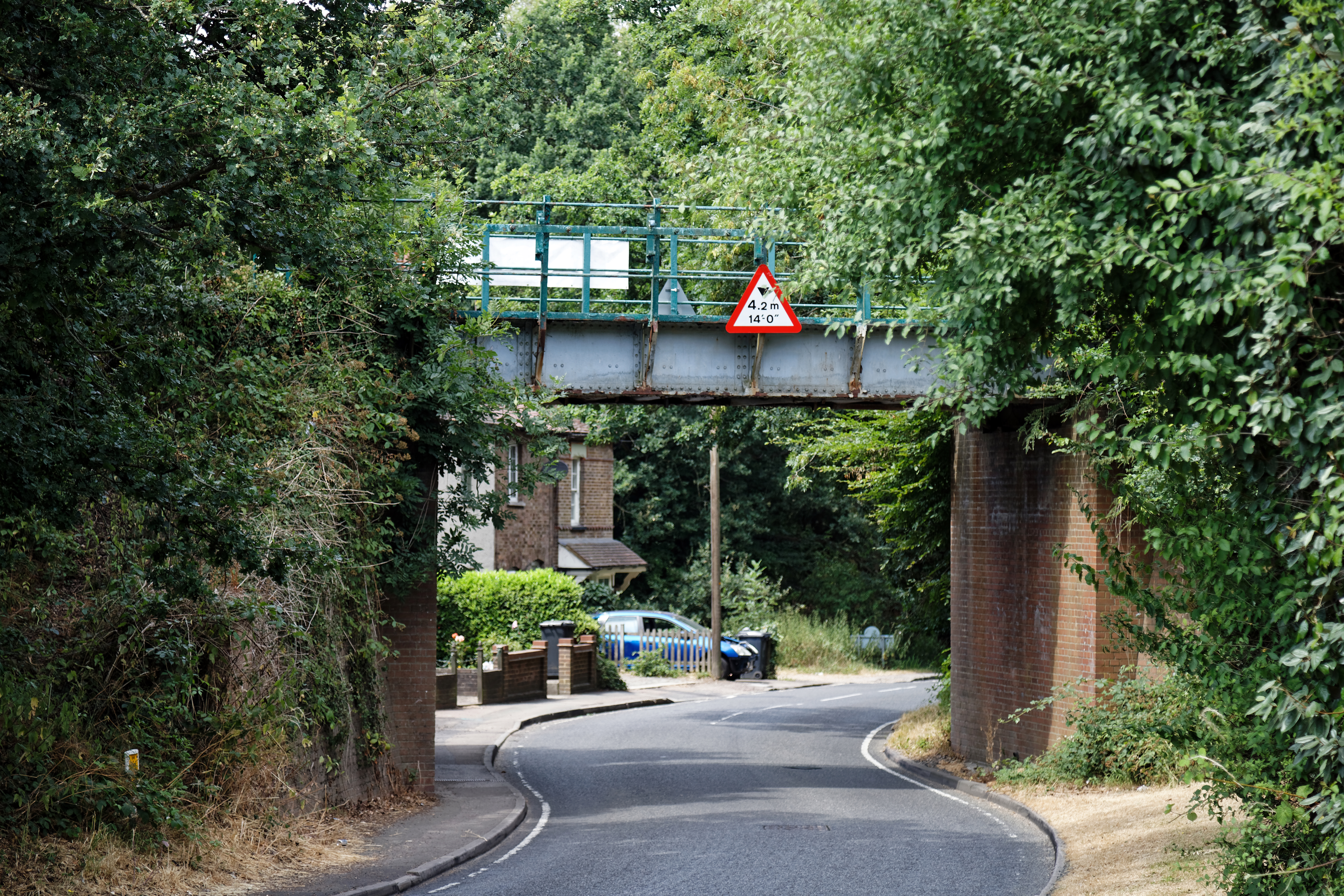
Epping Ongar Railway bridge on Coopersale Common Road

The Grade II listed Gothic Revival parish church (built 1852) of St Alban the Martyr stands at the point where Coopersale Common Road runs into Houblons Hill. The Coopersale ecclesiastical parish takes in Coopersale Street, most of the section of the town of Epping south-east of Epping High Street, the conjoined Epping town hamlet of Ivy Chimneys, and the north part of Theydon Garnon civil parish. St Alban's is in the deanery of Epping Forest and Ongar, in the Diocese of Chelmsford. The Grade II church hall, known as Parish Rooms (built 1882), is opposite the church. The former vicarage to the church, also built 1852 and Grade II, is adjacent to the church at the north-west. Coopersale House, dating to the 17th century and Grade II, is at the south of the village on Houblons Hill and close to the hamlet of Coopersale Street.

The village public house is Garnon Bushes at the north of the village, and just to the south from the railway bridge of the Epping Ongar Railway on Coopersale Common Road. Coopersale Halt, the present end of the line for this heritage railway, is 460 yards (400 m) south-west from the village. Coopersale also has a village hall (Coopersale Social Institute Hall), and an arcade of four shops, which back a small village park, with an Indian takeaway (previously a post office), a Happy Shopper store, a newsagents, and a small charity shop.

The village school is Coopersale and Theydon Garnon Church of England Primary School on Brickfield Road. Also on Brickfield Road and bordering Gernon Bushes nature reserve at the east, are the grounds of Coopersale Cricket Club, an amateur minor club which fields a team for Sunday friendly matches.
