= Epping, Essex =

Town and parish in Essex, England

Coordinates: 51.7004°N 0.1087°E

Epping
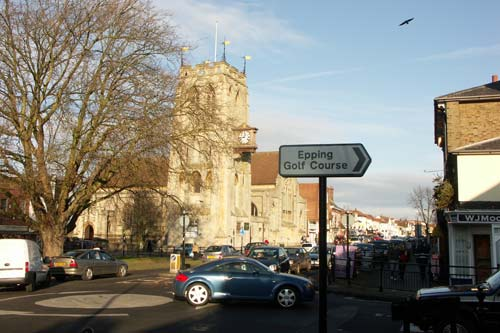
- High Street, and church of St John the Baptist

- Location within Essex
- Interactive map of Epping
- Area: 7.73 km^{2} (2.98 sq mi)
- Population: 12,547 (Parish, 2021); 10,695 (Built up area, 2021)
  - Density: 1,623/km^{2} (4,200/sq mi)
- OS grid reference: TL455025
  - London: 17 mi (27 km) SW
- Civil parish: Epping
- District: Epping Forest
- Shire county: Essex
- Region: East
- Country: England
- Sovereign state: United Kingdom
- Post town: EPPING
- Postcode district: CM16
- Dialling code: 01992
- Police: Essex
- Fire: Essex
- Ambulance: East of England
- UK Parliament: Epping Forest
- Website: Epping Town Council

Epping is a market town and civil parish in the Epping Forest District of Essex, England. It lies 17 miles (27 km) north-east of Charing Cross in central London. It is surrounded by the northern end of Epping Forest, and stands on a ridge of land between the River Roding and River Lea valleys.

Epping forms part of the London commuter belt; it is the eastern terminus of the London Underground's Central line, and the town lies just outside the M25 London Orbital Motorway. The town has a number of historic Grade I and II* and Grade II listed buildings. The weekly market, which dates to 1253, is held each Monday.

As well as the town itself, the parish also includes Coopersale and Fiddlers Hamlet. At the 2021 census the parish had a population of 12,547 and the built up area had a population of 10,695.

Epping became twinned with the German town of Eppingen in north-west Baden-Württemberg in 1981.

== History ==
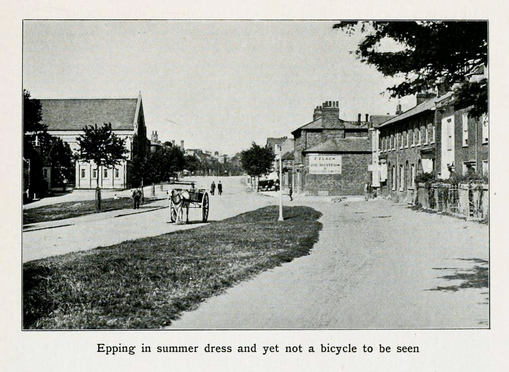
High Street, Epping, in Leaves from a Hunting Diary in Essex (1900). St John's Church is at the left, and shows it before a new and present tower was constructed in 1909.

The name Epping derives from the Old English yppeingas meaning 'the people of the raised place'.

"Epinga", a small community of a few scattered farms and a chapel on the edge of the forest, is mentioned in the Domesday Book of 1086. However, the settlement referred to is known today as Epping Upland. It is not known for certain when the present-day Epping was first settled. By the mid-12th century a settlement known as Epping Heath (later named Epping Street), had developed south of Epping Upland as a result of the clearing of forest for cultivation. In 1253 King Henry III conveyed the right to hold a weekly market in Epping Street which helped to establish the town as a centre of trade and has continued to the present day (the sale of cattle in the High Street continued until 1961).

The linear village of Epping Heath developed into a small main-road town and by the early 19th century development had taken place along what is now High Street and Hemnall Street. Hemnall Street was until 1894 in the parish of Theydon Garnon, as was the railway station. Up to 25 stagecoaches and mailcoaches a day passed through the town from London en route to Norwich, Cambridge and Bury St. Edmunds. In the early 19th century, 26 coaching inns lined the High Street. Two survive today as public houses: The George and Dragon and The Black Lion. The advent of the railways ended coach traffic and the town declined, but it revived after the extension of a railway branch line from Loughton in 1865 and the advent of the motor car.

A number of listed buildings, most dating from the 18th century, line both sides of the High Street although many were substantially altered internally during the 19th century. Some of the oldest buildings in the town are at each end of the Conservation Area, such as Beulah Lodge in Lindsey Street (17th century), and a group of 17th- and early 18th-century cottages numbered 98–110 on High Street.

Epping Church Act 1888
- Act of Parliament
- Parliament of the United Kingdom
- Long title: An Act to provide for the pulling down of the Chapel of Saint John the Baptist in Epping and building a new Church and constituting such new Church the Parish Church of Epping in lieu of the existing Parish Church; and for other purposes.
- Citation: 51 & 52 Vict. c. clii

Dates
- Royal assent: 7 August 1888

Text of statute as originally enacted

The original parish church, first mentioned in 1177, was All Saints' in Epping Upland, the nave and chancel of which date from the 13th century. In 1833, the 14th-century chapel of St John the Baptist in the High Road was rebuilt in the Gothic Revival style. It became the parish church of Epping by the Epping Church Act 1888 (51 & 52 Vict. c. clii) and was again rebuilt. A large tower was added in 1909.

The town was historically known in the 18th and 19th centuries for the Epping sausage and Epping butter, which is no longer produced.

== Governance ==
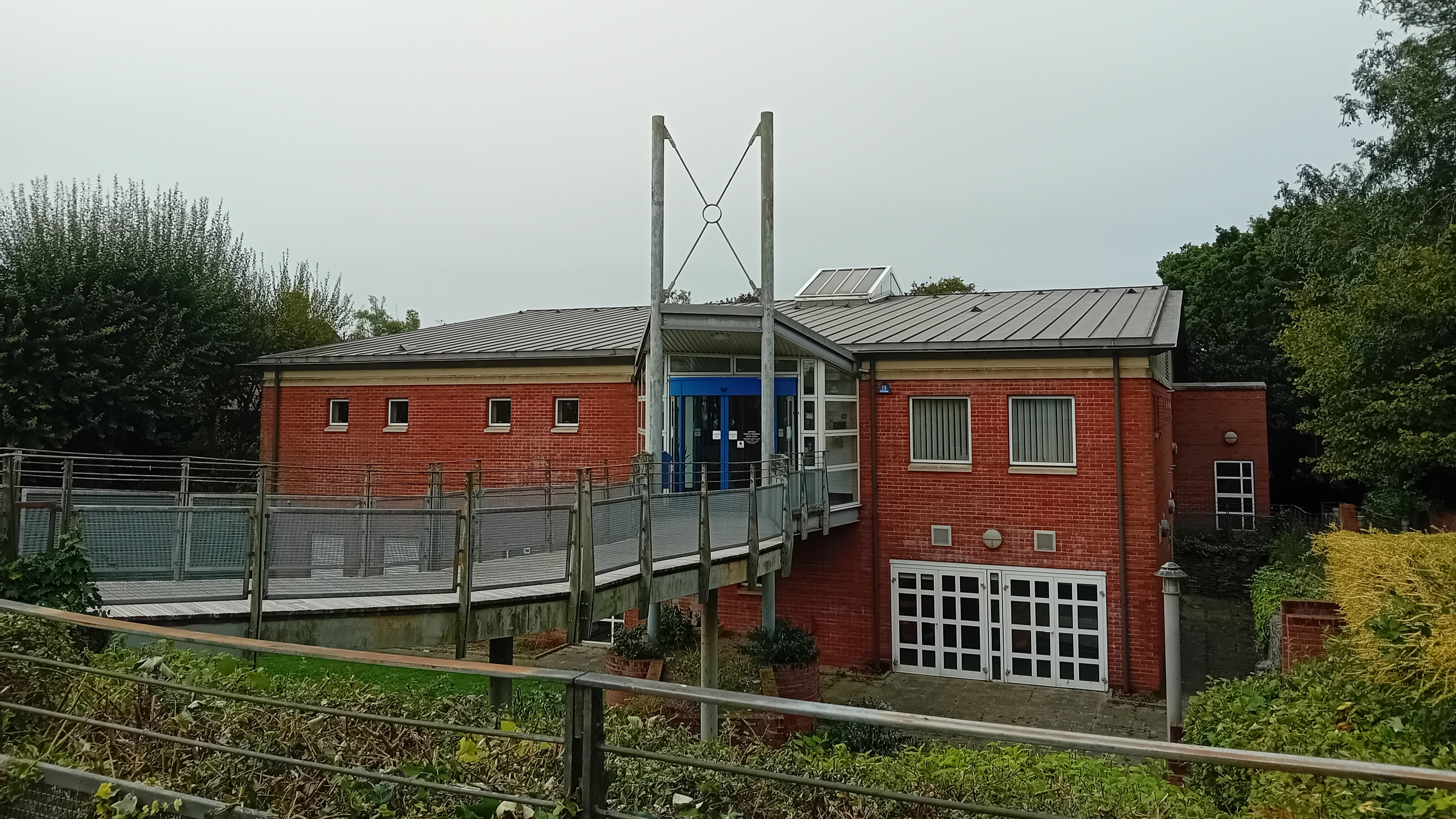
Epping Hall: Town Council headquarters

There are three tiers of local government covering Epping, at parish (town), district and county level: Epping Town Council, Epping Forest District Council and Essex County Council. The town council is based at Epping Hall on St John's Road. The district council is also based in the town, at the Civic Offices on High Street. The Old Town Hall was built in 1863.

The town sits in the Epping and Theydon Bois division of Essex County Council. The town is divided into two district council wards. Epping Hemnall encompasses most of the town south-east of Epping High Street (B1393) including Ivy Chimneys, Fiddlers Hamlet, Coopersale and Coopersale Street. The rest of Epping lies in Epping Lindsey and Thornwood ward, as does Thornwood in the adjacent parish of North Weald Bassett. Both wards elect three councillors each.

=== Administrative history ===
Epping was an ancient parish in the Waltham hundred of Essex. When elected parish and district councils were created in 1894, Epping was initially given a parish council and included in the Epping Rural District. Shortly afterwards it was decided that the town should become a separate urban district, but the more rural north-western part of the parish, including the original village of Epping, was not considered appropriate for inclusion in an urban district. Therefore the parish was split on 1 April 1896 into a rural parish called Epping Upland, which remained in the Epping Rural District, and an urban district called Epping (which also gained territory from the neighbouring parishes of Theydon Garnon and Theydon Bois at the same time).

Epping Urban District was abolished in 1974 when the modern Epping Forest District was created. A successor parish was created covering the area of the former urban district, with its parish council taking the name Epping Town Council.

=== Constituencies ===
Epping is part of the Epping Forest parliamentary constituency, represented by Conservative MP Neil Hudson and previously represented by former Deputy Speaker Eleanor Laing before the 2024 General Election. From 1924 to 1945, the old Epping division of Essex (which included Woodford, Chingford, Harlow and Loughton as well as Epping) was represented by Winston Churchill.

== Geography ==
Epping is 17 miles (30 km) north-east of the centre of London, and towards the northern end of Epping Forest on a ridge of land between the River Roding and River Lea valleys. It is 3 miles (5 km) north-east of Loughton, 10 miles (16 km) north of Ilford, 5 miles (8 km) south of Harlow and 11 miles (20 km) north-west of Brentwood. Epping is north of the village of Theydon Bois.

The Town lies north-east of junction 26 (Waltham Abbey, Loughton A121) of the M25 motorway and south-west of junction 7 (Harlow) of the M11 motorway.

== Community ==
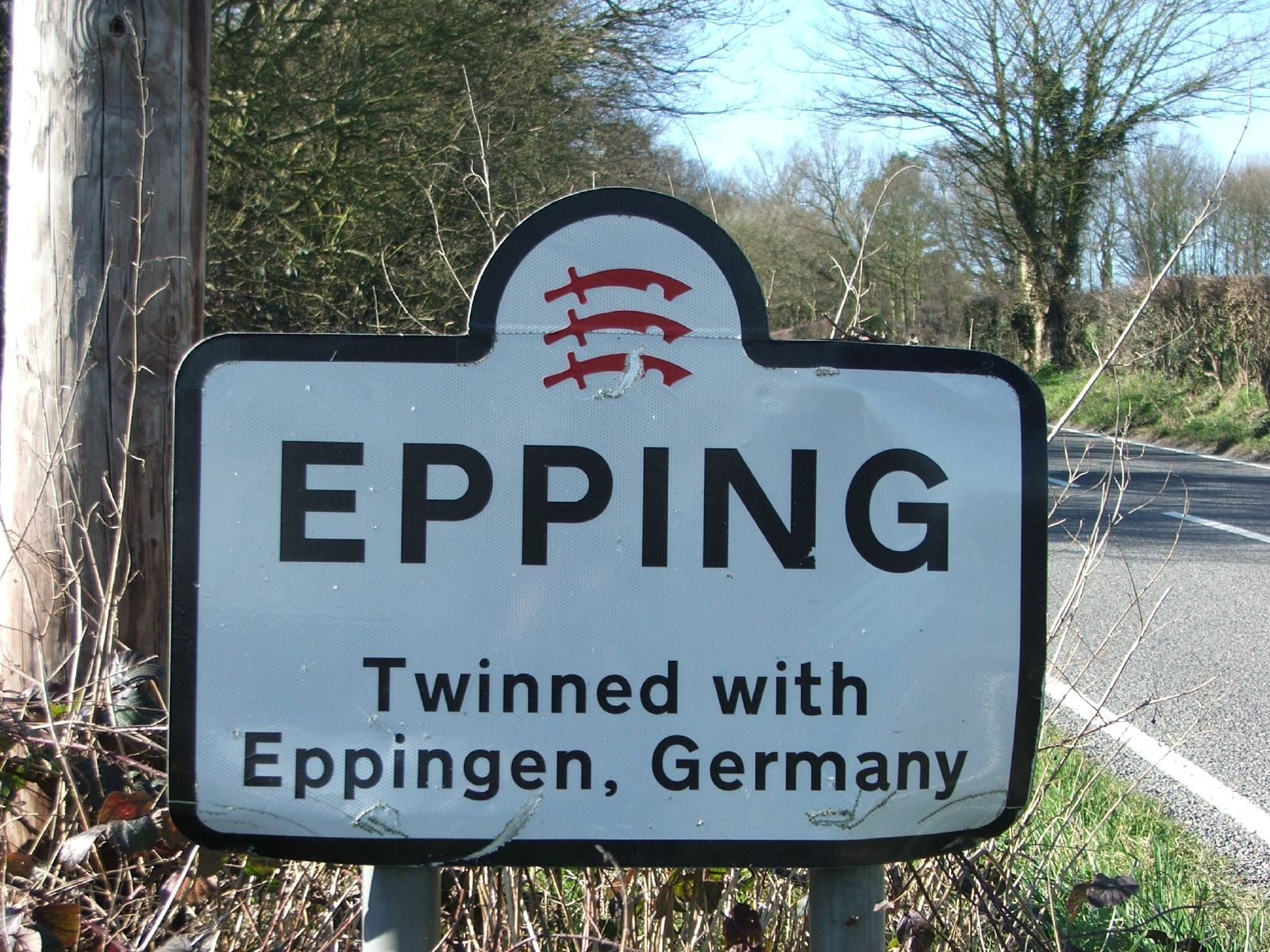
Sign showing twin towns of Epping

Most of the population live in the built up area centred on and around the High Street (B1393) and Station Road. About a thousand people live in the village of Coopersale which, while physically separated from Epping by forest land, is still part of the civil parish. A few dozen households make up the hamlets of Coopersale Street and Fiddlers Hamlet. Much of the eastern part of the present parish was until 1896 in the parish of Theydon Garnon.

The centre of Epping on and around the High Street is a designated conservation area.

The 2025 British anti-immigration protests started in Epping following the arrest of an Ethiopian asylum seeker in regards to three sexual assaults; he had arrived in the UK eight days prior and was being housed in the local Bell Hotel. A temporary injunction granted to Epping Forest district council was overturned by the court of appeal, allowing more than 130 asylum seekers to remain in the Bell Hotel.

== Transport ==
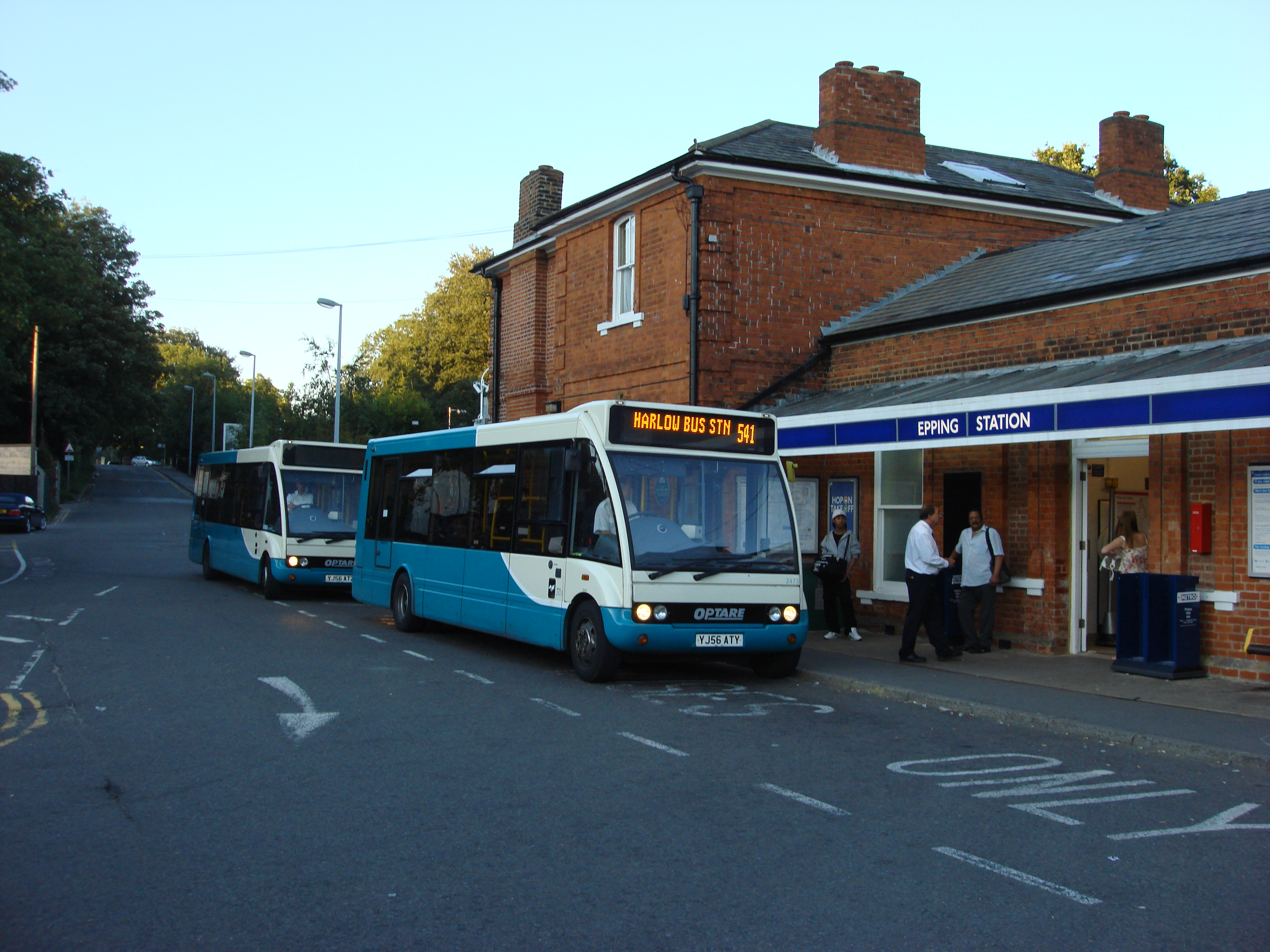
A route 541 bus at Epping Tube Station

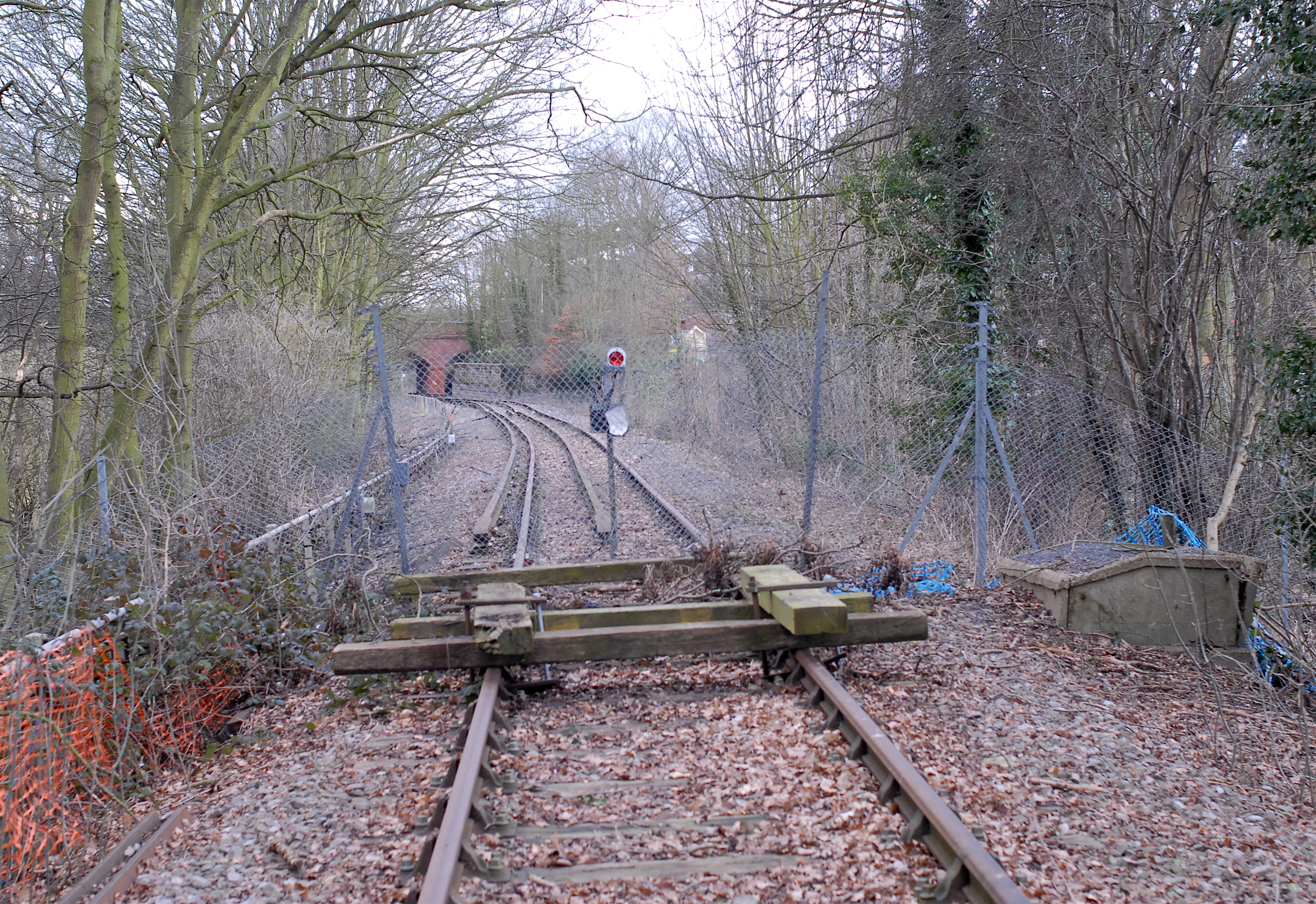
Railway track of the Epping Ongar Railway close to Epping tube station (Epping Forest Halt). Passengers cannot alight here due to the absence of a platform.

=== Rail ===
Epping tube station is a London Underground terminus, on the Central line.

The station is in London fare zone 6. There is a car park at the station. There is no Night Tube, as Central line services overnight on Fridays and Saturdays terminate at Loughton.

The Central line links Epping directly with east London, Stratford, The City, Oxford Street, and destinations in west London.

Until 1994, the Central line extended north from Epping to North Weald, Blake Hall (until 1981), and Ongar. Much of the line is now served by a heritage railway - the Epping Ongar Railway. The heritage railway does not serve Epping tube station, but the museum runs a heritage London Bus to the Central line station on some open days.

=== Road ===
Epping High Street is numbered B1393. The route runs north-south through the town.

The B181 runs east-west through Epping, between Roydon and North Weald.

The B182 runs along the south-western perimeter of the town, between Epping's Bell Common and Epping Upland.

These roads are maintained by Essex Highways.

=== Walking ===
Much of Epping Forest has unlimited walking access. The City of London Corporation, which looks after Epping Forest, has produced several waymarked walking routes for leisure.

== Education ==
- Epping St John's School, a Church of England school, is the only mainstream secondary school in Epping.

There are also a number of primary schools including Ivy Chimneys Primary School, Epping Primary School, and Coopersale Hall School.

== Media ==
Because of its close proximity to London, television signals are received from the Crystal Palace TV transmitter placing Epping in the BBC London and ITV London areas. However, the town can also receive the Sandy Heath TV transmitter which broadcast BBC East and ITV Anglia.

Local radio stations are BBC Essex on 95.3 FM, Heart East (formerly Ten-17) on 101.7 FM, and Forest Gold Radio, a community based radio station the broadcast from near the St Margaret's Hospital in the town on 99.3 FM.

The Epping Forest Guardian is town's local newspaper.

== Sport ==
Epping Town played in the Isthmian League until folding during the 1984–85 season.

== Notable people ==
- Jill Barklem, writer and illustrator
- Nick Berry, actor
- David Byron, former lead singer of rock band Uriah Heep
- Winston Churchill, Member of Parliament for the town and the larger constituency named after it from 1924 to 1945, including his tenure as prime minister during World War II
- Dodie Clark, singer and youtuber
- Crass, band
- Edward Doubleday (1810–1849), entomologist interested in Lepidoptera.
- Henry Doubleday (1808–1875), entomologist and ornithologist
- Sidney Godley, first private soldier awarded the Victoria Cross during the Great War
- Dave Gahan, singer, Depeche Mode frontman
- Philip Hammond, former chancellor of the exchequer
- David Halls, television entertainer and chef
- Glenn Hoddle, former professional football player and manager
- Griff Rhys Jones, TV presenter and comedian
- Jason Merrells, actor
- Julian Mitchell, screenwriter and novelist
- Dennis Rofe, former professional footballer
- Ben Shephard, television presenter
- Lisa Snowdon, model
- Rod Stewart, singer
- Jessie Wallace, actress
- Bradley Walsh, actor and television presenter
- Adrian Whitbread, football coach
- Gary Wraight, footballer

== See also ==
- List of twin towns and sister cities in the United Kingdom
