= Epping and Ongar Rural District =

Former local government area in the UK

Coordinates: 51.70°N 0.21°E

Epping and Ongar
- History
  - Created: 1955
  - Abolished: 1974
  - Succeeded by: Epping Forest District; Borough of Brentwood
- Status: Rural district
  - HQ: Epping

Epping and Ongar Rural District was a rural district in the county of Essex, England from 1955 to 1974.

== Creation ==
It was created in 1955 by the merger of the disbanded Ongar Rural District and most of the disbanded Epping Rural District, except the civil parishes of Great Parndon, Harlow, Latton, Little Parndon and Netteswell, which were largely transferred to the newly created Harlow Urban District reflecting its new town status. The Epping and Ongar administration was based in Epping.

== List of parishes ==
Parish	Before 1955 († or other)	After 1974 († or other)
Abbess Beauchamp and Berners Roding	Ongar Rural District	Epping Forest
Blackmore	Ongar Rural District	Brentwood
Bobbingworth	Ongar Rural District	Epping Forest
Chipping Ongar	Ongar Rural District	† Abolished 1965, absorbed by Ongar
Doddinghurst	Ongar Rural District	Brentwood
Epping Upland	Epping Rural District	Epping Forest
Fyfield	Ongar Rural District	Epping Forest
Greensted	Ongar Rural District	† Abolished 1965, absorbed by Ongar
High Laver	Ongar Rural District	Epping Forest
High Ongar	Ongar Rural District	Epping Forest
Kelvedon Hatch	Ongar Rural District	Brentwood
Lambourne	Ongar Rural District	Epping Forest
Little Laver	Ongar Rural District	Epping Forest
Magdalen Laver	Epping Rural District	Epping Forest
Matching	Epping Rural District	Epping Forest
Moreton	Ongar Rural District	Epping Forest
Navestock	Ongar Rural District	Brentwood
Nazeing	Epping Rural District	Epping Forest
North Weald Bassett	Epping Rural District	Epping Forest
Norton Mandeville	Ongar Rural District	† Abolished 1968, absorbed by High Ongar
Ongar	† Created 1965	Epping Forest
Roydon	Epping Rural District	Epping Forest
Sheering	Epping Rural District	Epping Forest
Shelley	Ongar Rural District	† Abolished 1965, absorbed by Ongar
Stanford Rivers	Ongar Rural District	Epping Forest
Stapleford Abbotts	Ongar Rural District	Epping Forest
Stapleford Tawney	Ongar Rural District	Epping Forest
Stondon Massey	Ongar Rural District	Brentwood
Theydon Bois	Epping Rural District	Epping Forest
Theydon Garnon	Epping Rural District	Epping Forest
Theydon Mount	Ongar Rural District	Epping Forest
Willingale	Ongar Rural District	Epping Forest

== Abolition ==
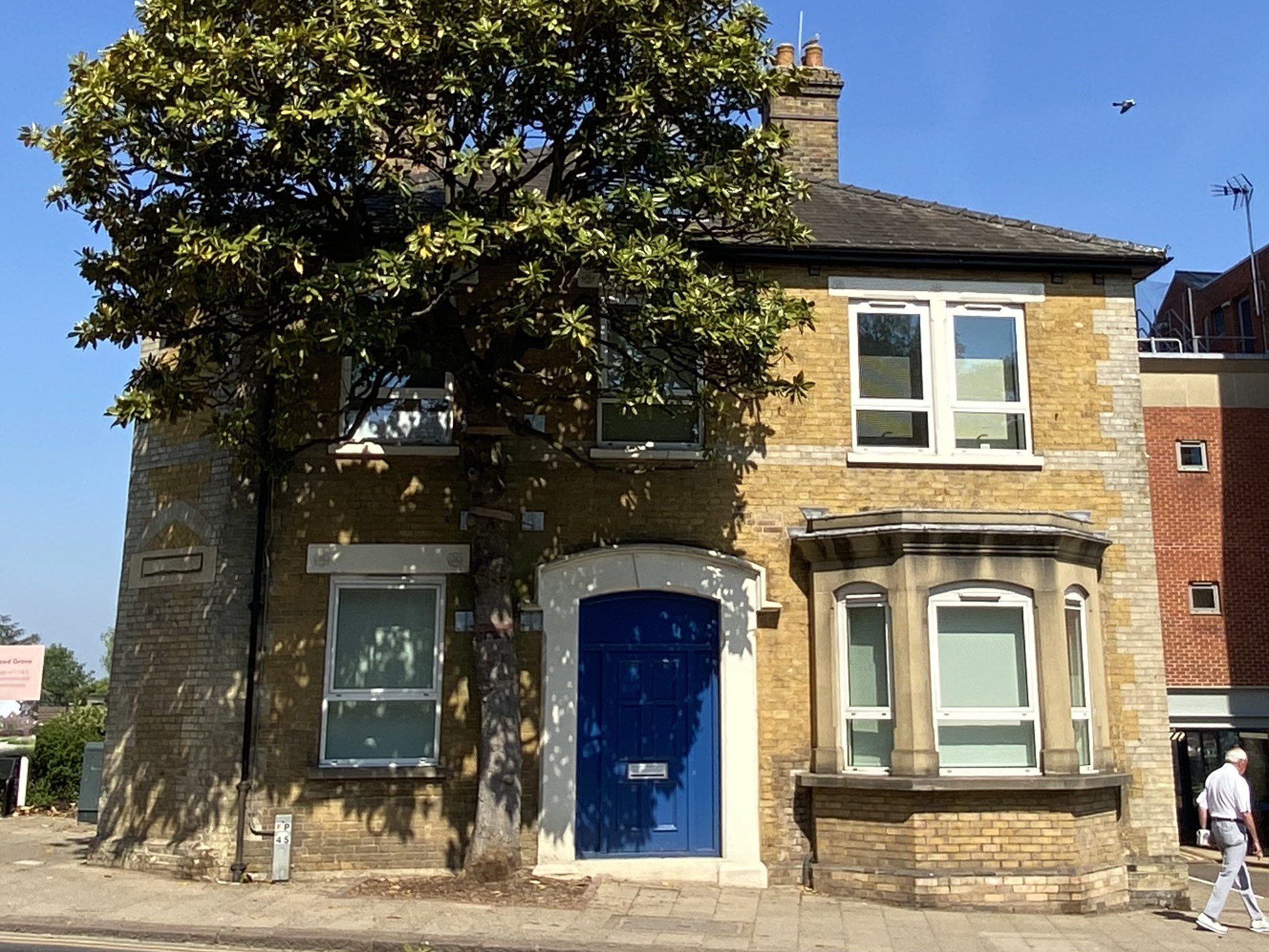
323 High Street, Epping: Council's offices at the time of its dissolution.

At the time of its dissolution it consisted of 29 civil parishes. Since 1 April 1974 it has formed part of the District of Epping Forest, except for the civil parishes of Blackmore, Doddinghurst, Kelvedon Hatch, Navestock and Stondon Massey, which became part of the Borough of Brentwood.

== See also ==
- Epping Ongar Railway
