= Shelley, Essex =

Village in Essex, England

Coordinates: 51.7229°N 0.2486°E

Shelley
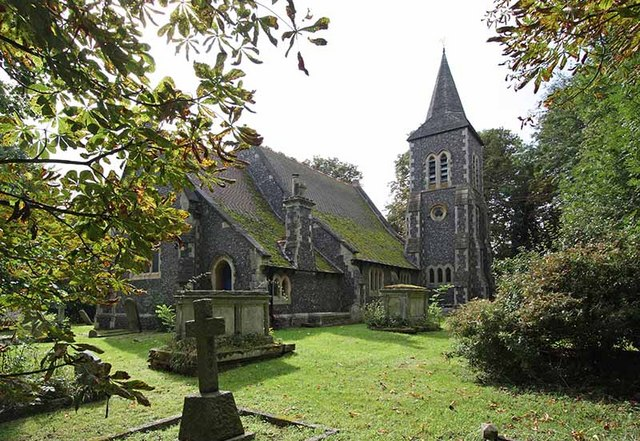
- St Peter's Church, Shelley

- Location within Essex
- Population: 2,425 (Built up area, 2021)
- OS grid reference: TL554050
- Civil parish: Ongar
- District: Epping Forest
- Shire county: Essex
- Region: East
- Country: England
- Sovereign state: United Kingdom
- Post town: ONGAR
- Postcode district: CM5
- Police: Essex
- Fire: Essex
- Ambulance: East of England
- UK Parliament: Brentwood and Ongar

Shelley is an area in the civil parish of Ongar in the Epping Forest district of Essex, England. It is in two main parts. The small older settlement of Shelley to the north comprises St Peter's Church and the manor house of Shelley Hall, with some scattered houses nearby. To the south, separated from the older part of Shelley by fields, is a suburban area of mostly 20th century development on the northern edge of the town of Chipping Ongar. At the 2021 census the built up area as defined by the Office for National Statistics (focused on the suburban part of Shelley) had a population of 2,425. Shelley lies 9 miles (14 km) west from the county town of Chelmsford.

== History ==
In Saxon times, Shelley formed part of the extensive estate and parish of Ongar, with its parish church at High Ongar. Ongar gradually fragmented into smaller manors, some of which also became parishes. Shelley had become a separate manor by the time of the Norman Conquest. In the Domesday Book of 1086 it was listed as "Senleia". The manor included 13 households, with five villagers, five smallholders, and three slaves, and included one lord's plough team and two men's plough teams. There were 20 acres (8 hectares) of meadow, and woodland with 150 pigs. It was recorded that in 1066 the manor was held by Leofday, under the overlordship of Esger the Constable. By 1086 the manor had been given to Reginald, under Geoffrey de Mandeville who was tenant-in-chief to William the Conqueror.

No priest or church was mentioned at Shelley in the Domesday Book, but it had certainly become a parish by the 13th century. The period after the Norman Conquest saw the establishment of many new parishes, often as a result of lords of the manor building new churches to serve their estates. St Peter's Church at Shelley was such a manorial church; there is known to have been a church at Shelley by 1250 on a site immediately adjoining the manor house of Shelley Hall, and the lord of the manor retained the advowson of the parish, giving the right to nominate new priests when vacancies arose.

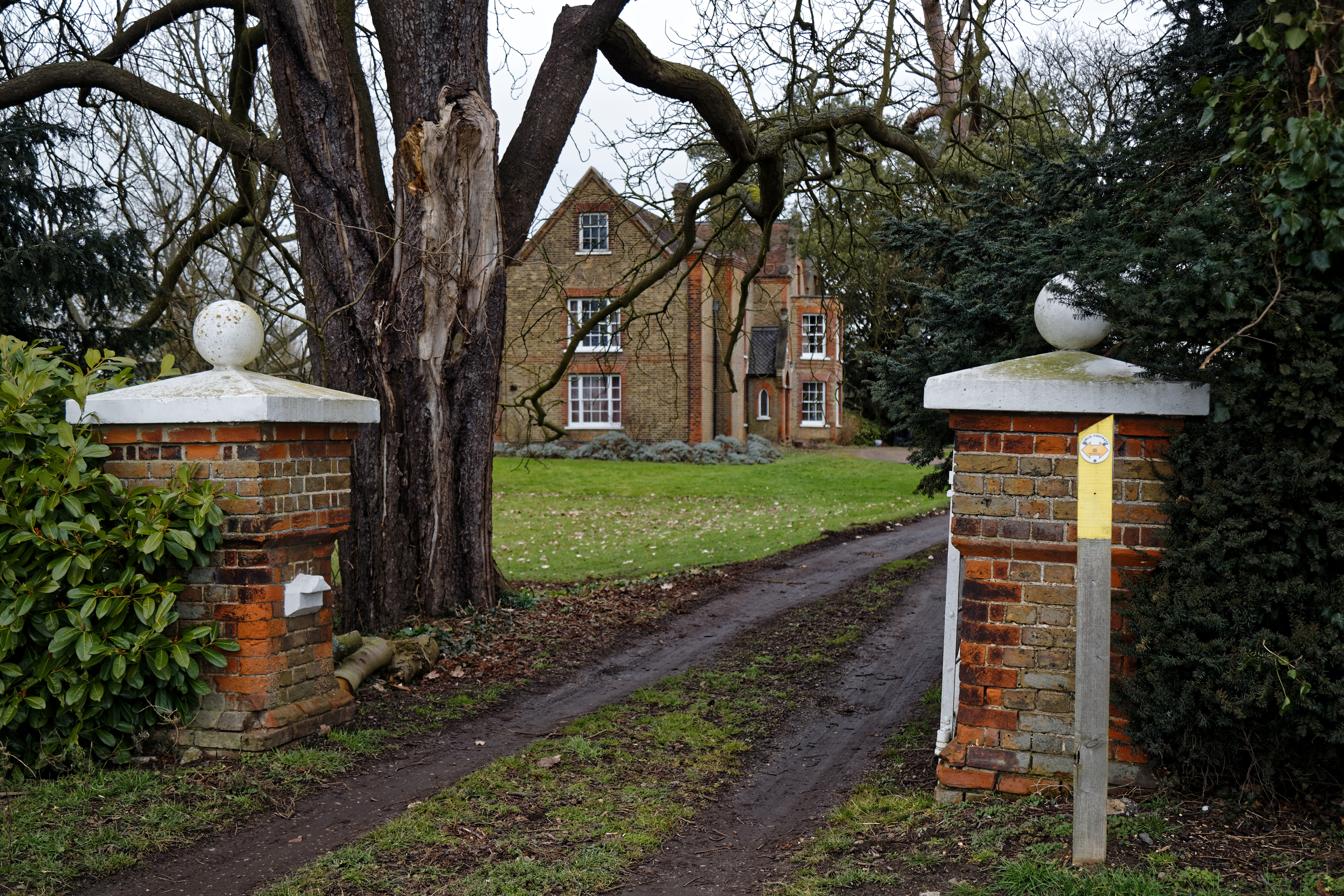
Shelley Hall in 2018

This original settlement of Shelley has remained essentially a small manorial complex just comprising the manor house and parish church. The current building of Shelley Hall dates back to the 14th century, with significant extensions and alterations from the 16th to 18th centuries. The current church was built in 1888 and is the third church building known to have stood on that site. It was designed in the Early English style, and is faced with flint and Bath stone. The tower, with a shingle broach spire is at the north-west corner of the church, the base of the tower forming the north-facing porch. There was formerly also a rectory at Shelley near the hall and church. It was described as "an ancient timber-framed building", and was where Thomas Newton (1704–1782), who later became the Bishop of Bristol in 1761, wrote his Dissertations on the Prophecies, which he completed in 1758. The rectory stood about 500 yards (457 m) west of the church and burned down in 1937.

The parish of Shelley was generally bounded to the north by Moreton, to the south by the A414 road from Harlow to Chelmsford, to the east by the B184 road from Chipping Ongar to Great Dunmow, and to the west by the south-east to north-west Moreton Road which edges Shelley Common with its River Roding tributary of Cripsey Brook.

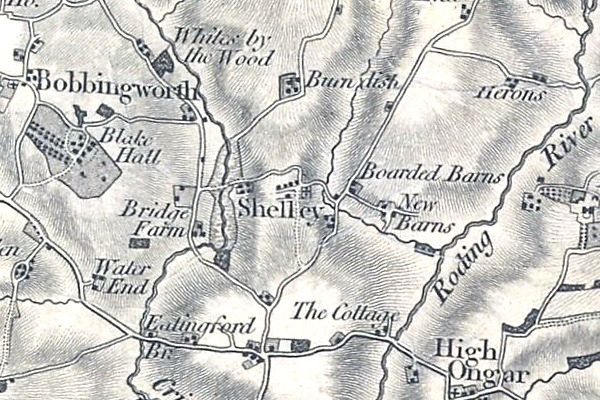
Shelley, Ordnance Survey map 1805

Until the 20th century, Shelley remained a parish of scattered houses and farmsteads rather than having a nucleated village. One notable farm is Bundish Hall, 0.5 miles (0.8 km) north from the church, on the boundary with the neighbouring parish of Moreton, which appears to have been of some importance in medieval times, having a moat.

In 1830 Shelley and eight other neighbouring parishes formed a union under Gilbert's Act to collectively administer their functions under the poor laws, building a workhouse at Stanford Rivers. This union was replaced in 1836 under the Poor Law Amendment Act 1834 by the much larger Ongar poor law union covering 26 parishes.

Crops grown in the parish were chiefly wheat, barley, beans, clover, and roots (typically root vegetables such as turnips), these on a soil of marl over a clay subsoil. Shelley parish area in 1848 was 660 acres (2.67 km^{2}); in 1882 was 586 acres (2.37 km^{2}); and in 1894, 1902 and 1914 was 604 acres (2.44 km^{2}). Shelley parish population in 1818 was 175; in 1833 was 163; in 1841 was 209; in 1881 was 200; in 1891 and 1901 was 186; in 1911 was 232, and in 1931 was 386.

Trade directory parish occupations in 1848 listed five farmers, a beer seller, and a plumber. By 1863 there were four farmers, one of whom was a cattle dealer, a tailor, two shoemakers, one of whom ran a beer house, and a 'traveller' (possibly a hawker). In 1874 there were four farmers, presuming one to be at Shelley Hall, and a new listing for the licensee of the Red Cow public house, who remained listed until at least 1914. By 1882 the number of farmers was reduced to three, and by 1914, to two. At Shelley Hall a mechanical engineer was listed for 1882. New occupations by 1914 were two accountants and a dressmaker. From 1863 to 1882 an establishment variously listed as a ladies' boarding school and ladies' academy was present at Shelley House, a building at the south on today's crossroads of the A414 and B184. This Georgian-facaded house with later 19th- and early 20th-century additions, probably dated to the late 17th century, but today is non-existent.

Until the Second World War Shelley was chiefly a rural parish. However, a small programme of council house and prefabricated bungalow building was started before the war on Moreton Road at the south by the then Ongar Rural District Council, which, between 1945 and 1953, planned and developed further housing on the southern part of Shelley, between Moreton Road and the A414, of approximately 450 houses, with shops, a community hall and Shelley primary school.

By the 1960s the built up area of Chipping Ongar had spread beyond its parish boundaries in several directions, including at Marden Ash to the south, Greensted to the west and the new housing estate in Shelley parish to the north. In 1965 the parishes of Chipping Ongar, Greensted and Shelley were abolished and replaced with a new civil parish called Ongar, which also took in the Marden Ash area from High Ongar parish. At the 1961 census (the last before the abolition of the civil parish), Shelley had a population of 2,090, having grown significantly from the 519 people it had in 1951, reflecting the growth of the suburban development on the edge of Chipping Ongar.

The new Ongar parish formed part of Epping and Ongar Rural District from 1965 until 1974 when it became part of the larger Epping Forest District. In 2006, Ongar Parish Council declared the parish to be a town, allowing it to take the name Ongar Town Council.

In 2013 a planning application was presented to Epping Forest District Council and Ongar Town Council by Fyfield Joint Venture, an organization based within Fyfield Business and Research Park which is privately operated by the real estate company Fyfield Business And Research Park Ltd. The proposal was to develop the Park with the addition of 105 homes and shops, an enlarged café, recreational facilities, 140 square metres (1,507 sq ft) of new retail space, increased parking, and a new access roundabout, partly on the green belt. Ongar Town Council wrote to Eric Pickles, the then Secretary of State for Housing, Communities and Local Government, over lack of public consultation and safety concerns. A revised plan was presented by Fyfield Joint Venture in 2015.

== Community ==
Shelley is in the Shelley Ward of the Ongar civil parish, under the local authority of Ongar Town Council.

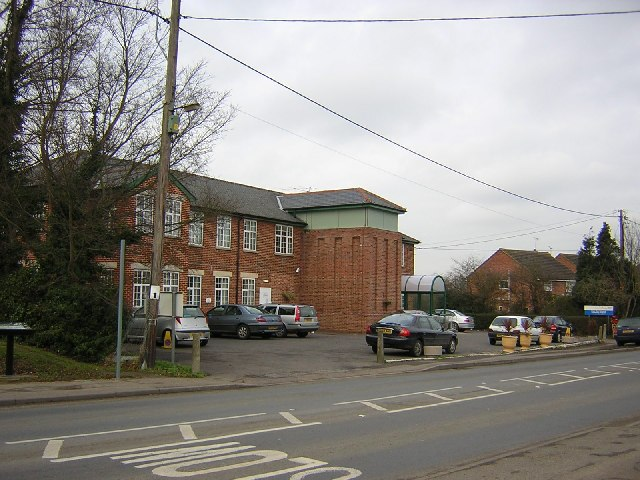
The War Memorial Hospital in 2006, today demolished and redeveloped as The War Memorial Medical Centre

Services and institutions in Shelley include the Fyfield Business and Research Park, The Ongar Academy secondary school, Ongar Leisure Centre, Ongar War Memorial Medical Centre, and branch of Comitti of London clockmakers, all on the B184 road. Ongar Primary School is adjacent to the A414 in the post-war housing development.

Fyfield Business and Research Park, 350 yards (320 m) to the east of St Peter's Church, provides 23 acres (0.09 km^{2}) and 25 units of laboratory, office, workshop, retail and services space. The Park includes a drug development laboratory, a building design consultancy company, an audio-visual & lighting company, building contractors' and surveyors' companies, an oil and gas extraction company, various design and consultancy firms, an E-commerce clothing shop, an Indian food takeaway, a private day nursery, and a screen printing company.

Other smaller services and shops in Shelley include further takeaways for kebab & pizza and fish & chips, a seafood restaurant, a hair salon, and two small convenience stores.

=== Education ===
In 1936, Essex County Council had established the Ongar County Secondary School in a neo-Georgian building fronting Fyfield Road, Shelley. The school expanded in the 1960s when it became Ongar Comprehensive School, but was closed in 1989. Its buildings were demolished to make way for a new residential development and new youth and adult education centres. Ongar Leisure Centre, a joint use sporting facility, was retained. Secondary school children were then bussed to schools in the surrounding towns, particularly Brentwood and Shenfield. Twenty six years later in September 2015, a new secondary education school called The Ongar Academy, with no historic association to any previous Ongar school apart from being built on part of the site of the earlier Ongar County Secondary School in Shelley, opened adjacent to Ongar Leisure Centre on Fyfield Road.
