= Tawney Common =

Hamlet in Essex, England

Coordinates: 51.68940°N 0.16738°E

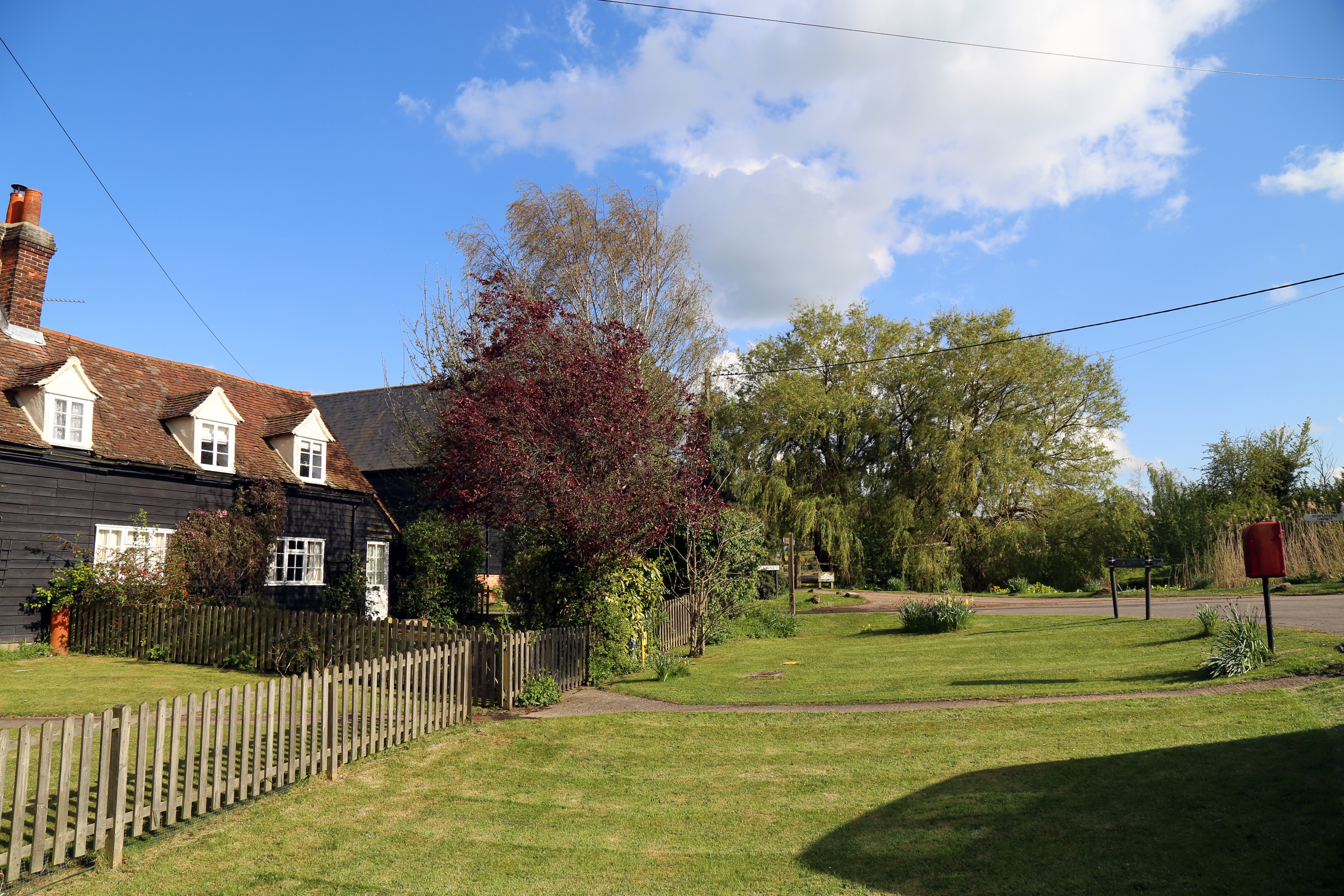
- Tawney Common

- Location within Essex
- Population: 40 (2015 estimate)
- OS grid reference: TL500012
- Civil parish: Stapleford Tawney
- District: Epping Forest
- Shire county: Essex
- Region: East
- Country: England
- Sovereign state: United Kingdom
- Post town: EPPING
- Postcode district: CM16
- Dialling code: 01992
- Police: Essex
- Fire: Essex
- Ambulance: East of England
- UK Parliament: Brentwood and Ongar

Tawney Common also known as Woodhatch, is a hamlet in the civil parish of Stapleford Tawney in the Epping Forest district of the county of Essex, England. It is approximately 2.5 miles (4 km) east of Epping, 4 miles (6 km) west of Chipping Ongar and 13 miles (20 km) west from the county town of Chelmsford. Stapleford Tawney is approximately 2 miles (3 km) to the south. Tawney Common is south of the hamlet of Collier's Hatch, also in the Stapleford Tawney parish.

The hamlet measures at 0.25 hectares and is mostly a collection of scattered houses and farms. As of 2017, there are 3 farms and 9 houses with an estimated average population of 40.

The hamlet is governed, locally by Stapleford Tawney parish council.

== History ==
Since 1755 the parish of Stapleford Tawney has always been held jointly with that of Theydon Mount but the two parishes have remained separate for civil purposes.

In 1771 a writer noted that Stapleford Tawney and the surrounding area "hath but few houses in it and seems to carry on no other business than that of husbandry (farming)". Stapleford Tawney is still a rural parish devoted almost exclusively to agriculture. In this parish mixed farming is the main form of labour. In 1837 there were estimated to be 491 acres of arable, 768 acres of meadow and pasture, and 125 acres of woodland in both Tawney Common and Stapleford Tawney.

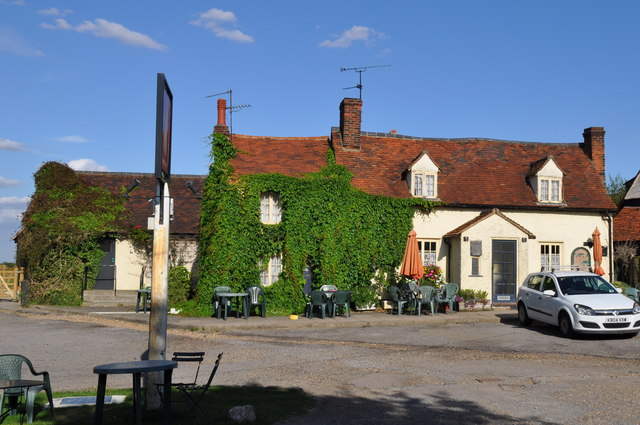
The Mole Trap pub

In 1826 a bill was paid for the erection of a cottage on Tawney Common, the first dwelling. This was followed by more expansion. The hamlet's pub, former inn, 'The Moletrap' is a timber-framed pub, and probably of the early 18th century. Samuel Threader invented the moletrap device and after he put it for commercial sale and made enough money, he built the ‘Mole Trap Beer Shop’ in 1871. ‘The Moletrap’ as it is now known, is still a functioning pub and restaurant.

There are no new building developments in Tawney Common, but the pre-existing houses are of 18th and 19th century origin. For example, the red brick built cottages on Tawney Common Road.

Water was supplied by the Hertfordshire and Essex Waterworks Company in 1949 to most of the parish, including Tawney Common. Electricity was laid on in December 1932 but not on Tawney Common, of which it was supplied at a later date.

== Geography ==
The hamlet varies in elevation. The highest elevation remains at 100 meters above sea level and lies on the beginning of Tawney Common Road, branching off from Mount Road. The lowest elevation is 90 meters above sea level and lies on the road away from Tawney Common, towards Collier's Hatch.

The elevation is high enough to provide panoramic views of the Essex countryside, however the north and west views from the hamlet are obscured by forestry.

== Governance ==
Tawney Common is represented at Westminster by Alex Burghart, MP for Brentwood and Ongar. It is strongly Conservative with the Conservatives winning 100% of the vote in 2016's local elections. It lies in the Passingford Ward of Epping Forest District Council's representative areas.

Tawney Common is represented at the Essex County Council by Maggie McEwan, county councillor for Ongar and Rural. A district and county councillor. In 2017, at the county council elections she won 68.2% of the vote, followed by the Liberal Democrats with 12.6%. This result makes Ongar and Rural the second most Conservative supporting area in Essex, behind North Weald and Nazeing.

Ongar & Rural
Party	Candidate	Votes	%	±%
Conservative	Maggie McEwen	2,336	68.2	+17.3
Liberal Democrats	Brian Surtees	432	12.6	+6.2
Labour Co-op	Liam Preston	316	9.2	−0.2
UKIP	Lawrence Mendoza	282	8.2	−17.3
English Democrat	Robin Tilbrook	58	1.7	−1.5
Majority		1,904	55.6	+30.1
Turnout		3,429	27.7	+3.4
Conservative hold		Swing	+5.5	

The hamlet of Tawney Common is governed locally by the Stapleford Tawney Parish council. This is a group of 5 elected parish councillors who represent both areas of Stapleford Tawney, Tawney Common and Collier's Hatch.

Party	Councillor
Independent	David Davenport
Independent	Stuart Galloway
Independent	Peter Moring
Independent	Maurice Padfield
Independent	Duncan Padfield

== Demography ==
Historical population
Year	Pop.	±%
1801	196	—
1841	350	+78.6%
1951	153	−56.3%
1961	129	−15.7%
1971	130	+0.8%
1981	138	+6.2%
1991	107	−22.5%
2001	103	−3.7%
2011		—

To the left is a table totalling the historical population of the Stapleford Tawney Parish. This encompasses the villages of Tawney Common, Stapleford Tawney and Collier's Hatch.

In 2001, the population of Tawney Common, the small village of Stapleford Tawney and hamlet of Collier's Hatch was 103. 53.4% of the parish was men, totalling to 55. Women made up 46.6% or 48 in total. The density of the parish's population was 0.15 people per hectare, down from 0.16 in 1991. This evidences the sparsely populated nature of the area.

The population live in the 43 houses in the parish. The average household size was 2.4, an increase from 2.3 in 1991.

Citizens aged 33 to 44 make up the majority of ages in the parish. In 2001, 29 residents were aged 33 to 44. The total number of over 60s (60-100) in the parish was 21. The total number of under 19s was also 21.

Of the population of the parish, the majority lived in houses or farms.

The population of white dwellers is high in the parish. All residents were of British or Irish, white ethnic origin.

The main religion in the parish is Christianity (2001). 78.6% (81) identify as Christian, whereas 15.5% (16) identify as irreligious.

In 2001, no people in the parish of Stapleford Tawney, Tawney Common or Collier's Hatch were unemployed. At the time, the majority of residents worked in manufacturing, closely followed by those healthcare and retail.

== Transport ==
=== Bus ===
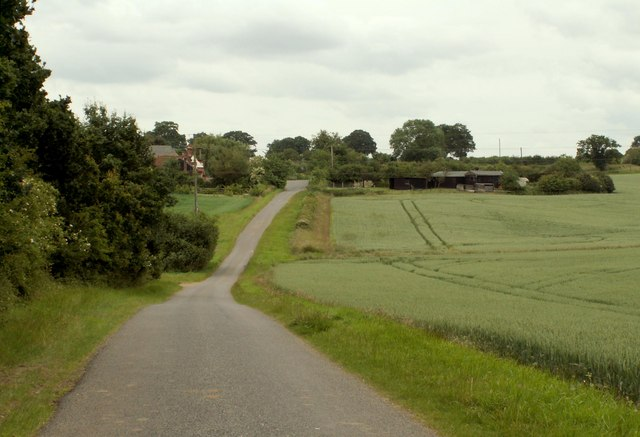
Tawney Common Road approaching the hamlet from Collier's Hatch.

There are no bus stops in the hamlet. Buses are also prohibited from riding the roads towards and within the hamlet, which are weak, narrow and only suitable for one car at a time. The nearest bus stop is on Hill Crest Road in Toot Hill. Bus services here are provided by Regal Busways and NIBS Buses. Most buses through from Hill Crest Road operate from Ongar to Epping, Epping to Harlow or Ongar to Harlow.

=== Train ===
The nearest station to Tawney Common is Epping which is served by the Central Line. The closest National Rail service is from Harlow Town (10.2 miles), which is served by the West Anglia Main Line and is operated by Greater Anglia. The next nearest station is Romford (10.9 miles).

=== Road ===
One road runs through the hamlet. Tawney Common Road starts at Banks Lane, which comes from Epping, and ends at a T-junction in Collier's Hatch. At this junction, Banks Lane ends and becomes Epping Road, which runs to Toot Hill.

At the Mole Trap pub, Tawney Lane (3.1 miles) splits off from Tawney Common Road which leads to St Mary's Church in Stapleford Tawney and the village of Stapleford Tawney itself.

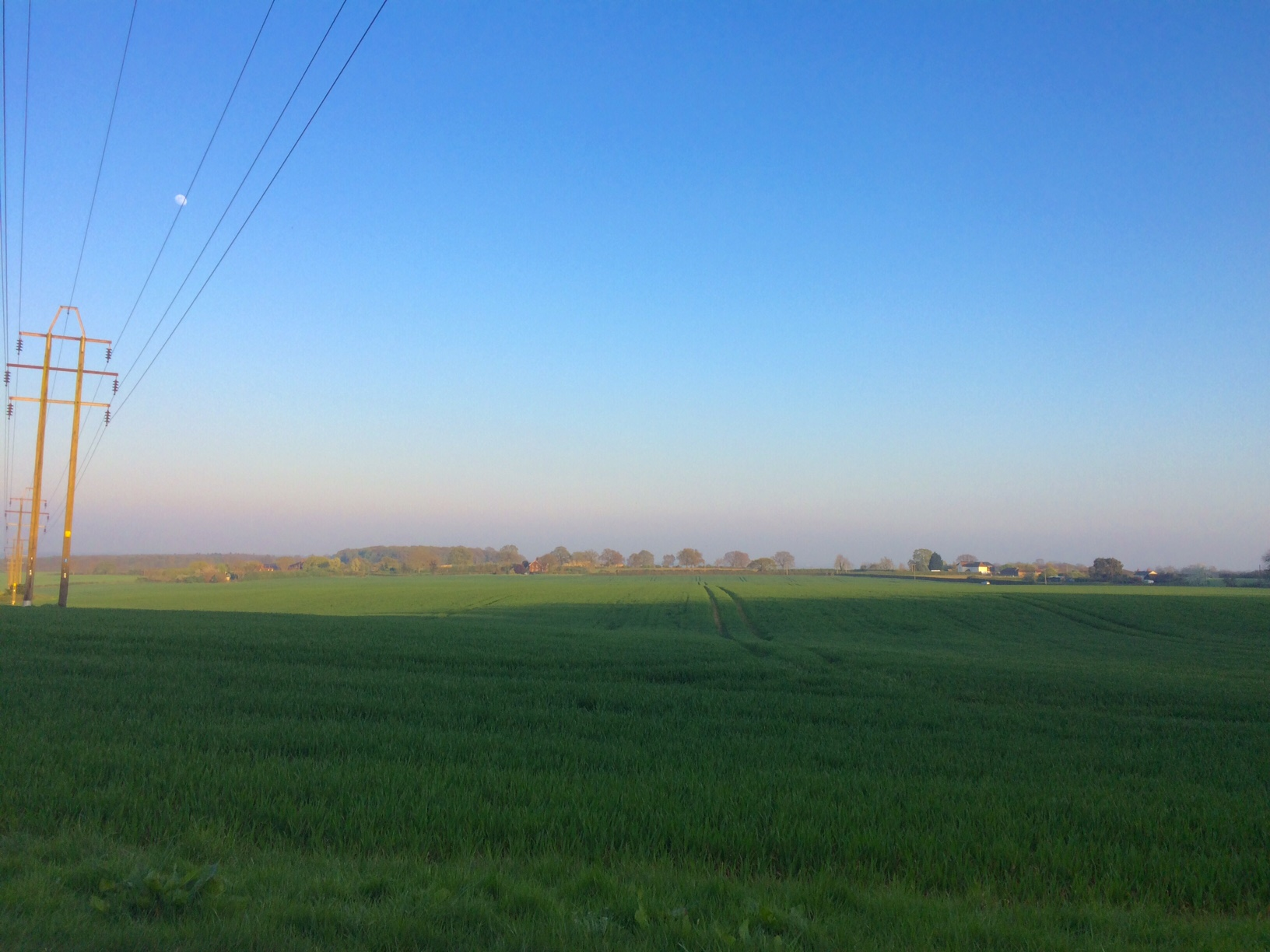
Views of Tawney Common from Banks Lane.

The roads are narrow, weak and only suitable for one car at a time. They are surrounded by hedges and fields.

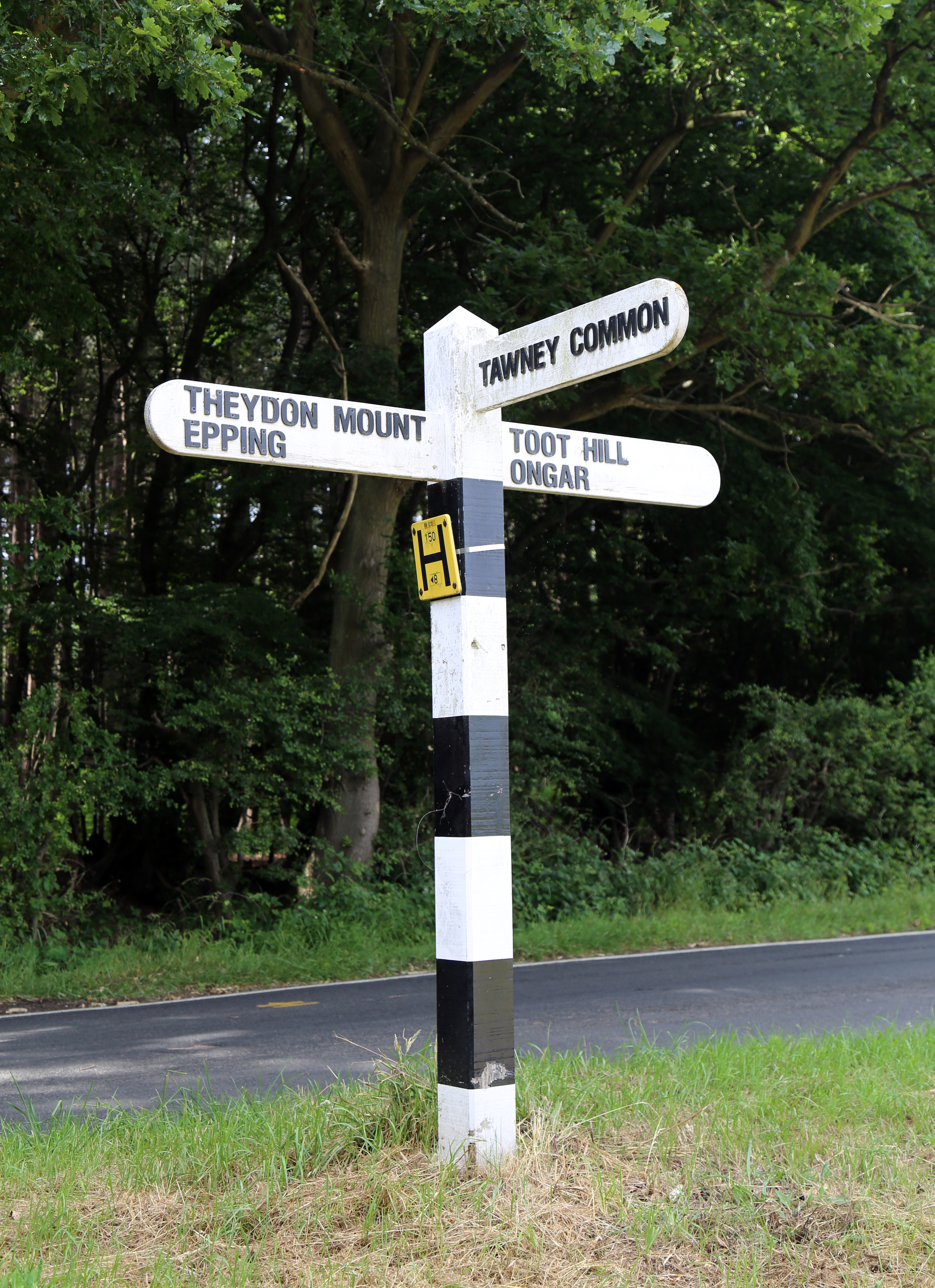
A finger-post on Banks Lane at the T-junction of Tawney Common Road.

== Landmarks ==
- The Mole Trap pub is a timber-framed pub, and probably of the early 18th century. In January 2019,'The Moletrap' as it is now known, closed down but it has since been acquired by a new landlord in late 2020 and reopened in late Summer 2021 as a food led pub.

== Notable people ==
Samuel Threader (1814-1879), inventor of the mole trap device and first inhabitant of the Mole Trap pub in 1871.

== See also ==
- Stapleford Tawney
- Collier's Hatch
