= Nine Ashes =

Hamlet in Essex, England

Coordinates: 51.7006°N 0.3042°E

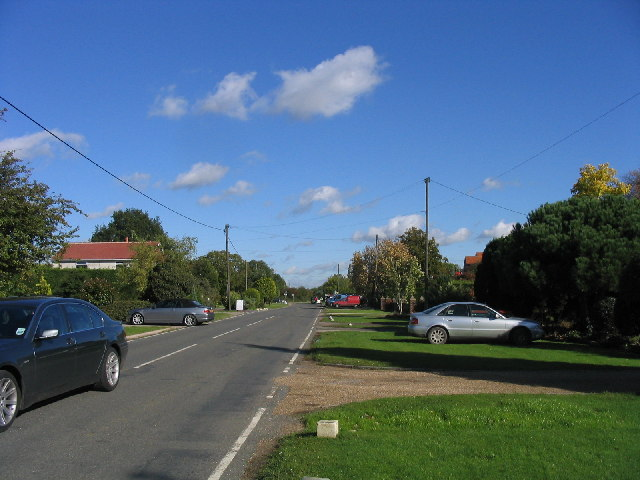

- Location within Essex
- OS grid reference: TL590024
- Civil parish: High Ongar
- District: Epping Forest
- Shire county: Essex
- Region: East
- Country: England
- Sovereign state: United Kingdom
- Post town: Ingatestone
- Postcode district: CM4
- Police: Essex
- Fire: Essex
- Ambulance: East of England

Nine Ashes is a hamlet in the civil parish of High Ongar, in the Epping Forest district of Essex, England. The hamlet, a linear development along Nine Ashes Road, is less than 1 mile south from the Harlow to Chelmsford A414 road. Nearby settlements including the village of Norton Heath and the hamlet of King Street.
