= Stapleford Tawney =

Village in Essex, England

Coordinates: 51.666667°N 0.171667°E

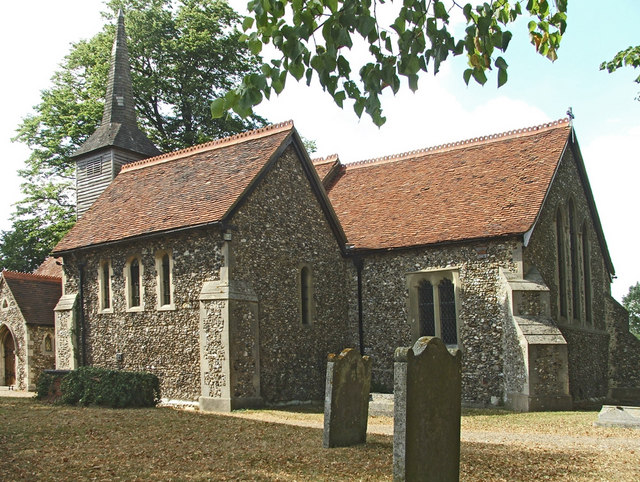
- St Mary's Church, Stapleford Tawney

- Location within Essex
- Interactive map of Stapleford Tawney
- Population: 171 (Parish, 2021)
- Civil parish: Stapleford Tawney
- District: Epping Forest
- Shire county: Essex
- Region: East
- Country: England
- Sovereign state: United Kingdom
- Post town: EPPING
- Postcode district: CM16
- Post town: ROMFORD
- Postcode district: RM4
- Dialling code: 01992
- Police: Essex
- Fire: Essex
- Ambulance: East of England
- UK Parliament: Brentwood & Ongar

Stapleford Tawney is a village and civil parish in the Epping Forest district of Essex, England. It is approximately 4 miles (6 km) west from Chipping Ongar and 14 miles (23 km) south-west from the county town of Chelmsford. At the 2021 census the parish had a population of 171.

== History ==
Historically Stapleford Tawney was included in the hundred of Ongar. It formed part of the Ongar Rural District Council from 1894 until that authority was absorbed into Epping and Ongar Rural District Council in 1955. Following local government reorganisation in 1974 it became part of Epping Forest District.

Electricity was first connected to the parish in 1932 and most of the parish was supplied with water by the Herts and Essex Waterworks Co. in 1949.

=== Population ===
The parish was more populous in the past than at present. The peak was in the Victorian period.

Historic population
Year	Population
1801	196
1841	350
1951	153
2001	103
2021	171

== Geography ==
The parish is long and narrow, extending roughly 3 miles (5 km) from north to south but is generally only about 1 mile (1.6 km) wide for much of its length. Its southern boundary is formed by the River Roding, while a stream flowing into it forms much of the parish's western boundary. The land rises quite steeply from below 30 metres where the Roding flows into Theydon Mount to above 90 metres in the extreme north, much of the parish being above the 60 metre contour. The parish covers an area of 670 hectares.

There is no strong focus of settlement in the parish except for the parish Church of St Mary on Tawney Lane which is within a small linear group of houses and farms. At the north of the parish, 2 miles (3 km) from the parish church, are the hamlets of Colliers Hatch and Tawney Common.

Individual farms and houses are scattered throughout the parish. Land use is mostly agricultural. The M25 motorway cuts through the southern tip of the parish.

== See also ==
- Stapleford Abbotts
- Collier's Hatch
