= Colliers Hatch =

Hamlet in Essex, England

Coordinates: 51.6984°N 0.1693°E

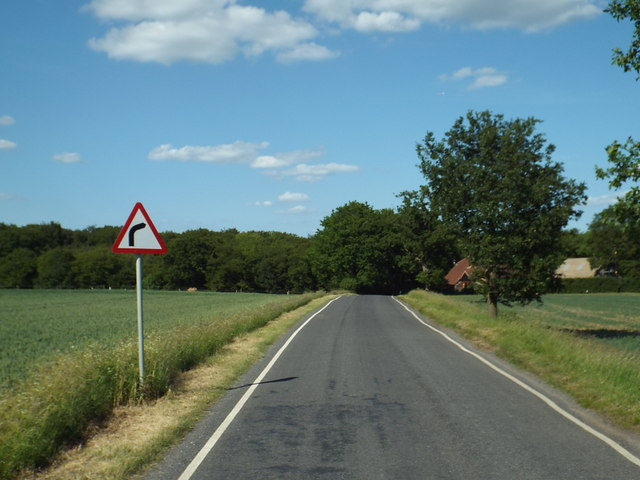

- Location within Essex
- Population: 30 (2015 estimate)
- OS grid reference: TL4997902154
- Civil parish: Stapleford Tawney
- District: Epping Forest
- Shire county: Essex
- Region: East
- Country: England
- Sovereign state: United Kingdom
- Post town: EPPING
- Postcode district: CM16
- Dialling code: 01992
- Police: Essex
- Fire: Essex
- Ambulance: East of England
- UK Parliament: Brentwood and Ongar

Colliers Hatch, is a hamlet in the civil parish of Stapleford Tawney in the Epping Forest district of the county of Essex, England. It is approximately 2 miles (3 km) east of Epping, 3.5 miles (6 km) west of Chipping Ongar and 7 miles (11 km) north of Romford. Colliers Hatch is 0.5 miles (0.8 km) north of the hamlet of Tawney Common, also in the Stapleford Tawney parish.

The hamlet measures 0.25 hectares (0.62 acres) and is mostly a collection of scattered houses and farms. As of 2017, there is an estimated average population of 30.

The hamlet is governed locally by Stapleford Tawney parish council.

== History ==
The ancient history of Collier's Hatch can be seen at the discovery of Roman ruins. Alongside this, 108 Roman coins and 9 brooches were found. Archaeologists agree that these stem from the Constantinian period (c. 307-364 AD). The discovery of a Roman site including the remains of Roman regular, imbrue and brick fragments, pottery shards were discovered around what experts believe is a possible Roman villa. The site of which these were discovered is Moat House, a 17th-century building surrounded by a moat. This is currently listed as a Grade II building.

In pre-medieval times, Colliers Hatch became a source of charcoal to the capital, London. Geologists have found that the area of Collier's Hatch is rich in charcoal. Charcoal was the main fuel of bread ovens in the capital. Bread ovens were called 'colliers' and many were found in the surrounding woods in the local area, hence the name, Collier's Hatch.

Between 1200 and 1350 AD, the wood, originally called Ongar Park Pale (now Kiln Wood) was used as a 500 hectare hunting ground for the local nobility. These enclosed parks were used for the hunting of deer, boar and other wild animals, traditionally adjacent to a manor. These parks were established under the Anglo-Saxon era however popularity for them increased immensely under the Normans. This was estimated to be one of 3,000 nationally. Ongar Park is a particularly early, and a well documented, example of an English deer park and is the earliest known park in Essex. The park has been dated by documentary evidence to the Anglo Saxon period. It was mentioned in a will of 1045 and is one of 36 examples of parks known from throughout the country in Domesday Book of 1086. In the 13th century the park was transformed into the manor of Ongar Park, which resulted in the retention of the majority of the park's medieval boundaries up to the present day in field boundaries. The length included in the present scheduling represents a sample of the total length of the pale and includes some of the best preserved earthworks. Ongar Park Pale as a hunting ground is defined by its upstanding earthwork banks and partly buried ditches. Archaeology around the area has found artifactual and environmental evidence of a deer park and hunting ground. By the 17th century Ongar Park Pale had virtually disappeared.

In the 17th-century Colliers Hatch had experienced some building development. Moat House is a Grade II listed building occupying the centre of an island surrounded by a moat. A causeway across the western arm of the moat provides access to the island. A spur of the ditch extending 4m beyond the outer edge of the western arm of the moat may have served as a watering place for cattle from the adjacent fields. A leat continues southwards for 8m from the eastern arm of the moat linking the moat with adjacent drainage ditches. The moat is marked on a number of historic maps including Chapman and Andre's 1777 Map of Essex, the 1809 'Survey of a Farm in the Parish of Stapleford Tawney' which was reduced from a 1757 survey, and the 1838 Tithe Map of Stapleford Tawney. These show that the moated site has changed little from the late 18th century. Further examples are situated 3.4 km to the north west at North Weald Bassett.

Finch's Farm was established in 1681 with a messuage. This is recorded in 1747 as 'Steward Farm'. Alongside this, Tawney Hatch, another house was erected in this era and granted Grade II listed status in 1984.

== Governance ==
Colliers Hatch is represented at Westminster by Alex Burghart, MP for Brentwood and Ongar. It is strongly Conservative with the Conservatives winning 100% of the vote in 2016's local elections. It lies in the Passingford Ward of Epping Forest District Council's representative areas.

Colliers Hatch is represented at the Essex County Council by Maggie McEwan, county councillor for Ongar and Rural. A district and county councillor. In 2017, at the county council elections she won 68.2% of the vote, followed by the Liberal Democrats with 12.6%. This result makes Ongar and Rural the second most Conservative supporting area in Essex, behind North Weald and Nazeing.

Ongar & Rural
| Party | Candidate | Votes | % | ±% |
|---|---|---|---|---|
| Conservative | Maggie McEwen | 2,336 | 68.2 | +17.3 |
| Liberal Democrats | Brian Surtees | 432 | 12.6 | +6.2 |
| Labour Co-op | Liam Preston | 316 | 9.2 | −0.2 |
| UKIP | Lawrence Mendoza | 282 | 8.2 | −17.3 |
| English Democrat | Robin Tilbrook | 58 | 1.7 | −1.5 |
| Majority | | 1,904 | 55.6 | +30.1 |
| Turnout | | 3,429 | 27.7 | +3.4 |
| Conservative hold | | Swing | +5.5 | |

The hamlet of Colliers Hatch is governed locally by the Stapleford Tawney Parish council. This is a group of 5 elected parish councillors who represent both areas of Stapleford Tawney, Tawney Common and Collier's Hatch.

| Party | Councillor |
|---|---|
| Independent | David Davenport |
| Independent | Stuart Galloway |
| Independent | Peter Moring |
| Independent | Maurice Padfield |
| Independent | Duncan Padfield |

== Geography ==
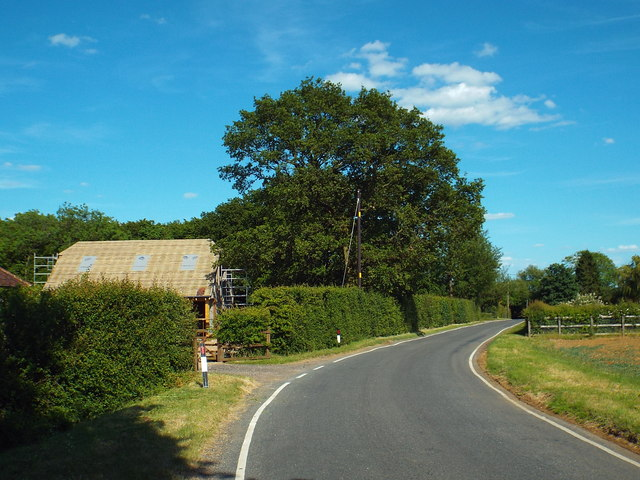
Approaching Colliers Hatch from Epping.

The hamlet varies in elevation. The highest elevation remains at 91 meters above sea level and lies on the beginning of Tawney Common Road, branching off from Mount Road. The lowest elevation is 84 meters above sea level and lies on the road away from Tawney Common, towards Tawney Common.

The elevation is high enough to provide panoramic views of the Essex countryside, however the north and west views from the hamlet are obscured by forestry.

== Demography ==
Historical population
| Year | Pop. | ±% |
|---|---|---|
| 1801 | 196 | — |
| 1841 | 350 | +78.6% |
| 1951 | 153 | −56.3% |
| 1961 | 129 | −15.7% |
| 1971 | 130 | +0.8% |
| 1981 | 138 | +6.2% |
| 1991 | 107 | −22.5% |
| 2001 | 103 | −3.7% |
| 2011 | | — |

To the left is a table totalling the historical population of the Stapleford Tawney Parish. This encompasses the villages of Tawney Common, Stapleford Tawney and Collier's Hatch.

In 2001, the population of Tawney Common, the small village of Stapleford Tawney and hamlet of Collier's Hatch was 103. 53.4% of the parish was men, totalling to 55. Women made up 46.6% or 48 in total. The density of the parish's population was 0.15 people per hectare, down from 0.16 in 1991. This evidences the sparsely populated nature of the area.

The population live in the 43 houses in the parish. The average household size was 2.4, an increase from 2.3 in 1991.

Citizens aged 33 to 44 make up the majority of ages in the parish. In 2001, 29 residents were aged 33 to 44. The total number of over 60s (60-100) in the parish was 21. The total number of under 19s was also 21.

Of the population of the parish, the majority lived in houses or farms.

The population of white dwellers is high in the parish. All residents were of British or Irish, white ethnic origin..

The main religion in the parish is Christianity (2001). 78.6% (81) identify as Christian, whereas 15.5% (16) identify as irreligious.

In 2001, no people in the parish of Stapleford Tawney, Tawney Common or Collier's Hatch were unemployed. At the time, the majority of residents worked in manufacturing, closely followed by those healthcare and retail.

== Landmarks ==
Kiln Wood (formerly Ongar Park Pale) historically is a former deer park for Anglo-Saxon and Norman nobility. This ancient woodland is hilly and has been the site of many Norman and Anglo-Saxon artifactual discoveries.

Moat House, currently a private dwelling, is a historic house which stands on the grounds of what is believed to be a Roman villa. Roman coins, pottery and various other artefacts have been discovered on the site. The moat and main house are from the 17th century and is visible from Tawney Common Road.

== Transport ==
=== Bus ===
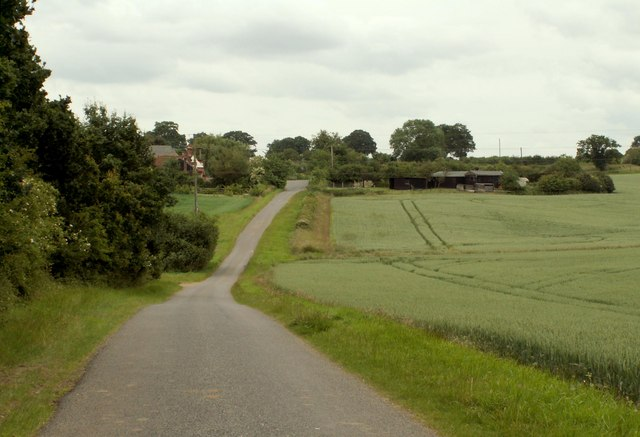
Tawney Common Road, taken from Collier's Hatch.

There are no bus stops in the hamlet. Buses are also prohibited from riding the roads towards and within the hamlet, which are weak, narrow and only suitable for one car at a time. The nearest bus stop is on Hill Crest Road in Toot Hill. Bus services here are provided by Regal Busways and NIBS Buses. Most buses through from Hill Crest Road operate from Ongar to Epping, Epping to Harlow or Ongar to Harlow.

=== Train ===
The nearest London Underground station to Colliers Hatch is Epping which is served by the Central Line. The closest National Rail service is from Harlow Town (10.2 miles), which is served by the West Anglia Main Line and is operated by Greater Anglia. The next nearest station is Romford (10.9 miles).

=== Road ===
One road runs through the hamlet. Tawney Common Road starts at Banks Lane, which comes from Epping, and ends at a T-junction in Collier's Hatch. At this junction, Banks Lane ends and becomes Epping Road, which runs to Toot Hill.

The roads are narrow, weak and only suitable for one car at a time. They are surrounded by hedges and fields.
