= The Ongar Academy =

- The Ongar Academy school badge

Location
- Fyfield Road; Ongar, Essex, CM5 0AN; England; 51.7156°N 0.2481°E

Information
- Type: Free school
- Established: 2015
- Trust: Bridge Academy Trust
- Department for Education URN: 141947 Tables
- Ofsted: Reports
- Head teacher: Jonathan Sands
- Staff: 65
- Gender: mixed
- Age: 11 to 16
- Capacity: 600
- Houses: Agnesi; Brunel; Curie; Darwin
- Colours: Black and green
- Website: theongaracademy.org

The Ongar Academy is a mixed comprehensive secondary school, on Fyfield Road in Shelley, in the civil parish of Ongar in Essex, England.

== History ==
=== Background ===
The town of Chipping Ongar has a long history of secondary education. Ongar Grammar School was a private school for boys which was opened as a boarding school in 1811 by William Stokes M.A. By 1845 the school was known as 'Ongar Academy' (not in the post-2010 Academy school sense), by 1874 it was known as a private grammar school, by 1882 as Chignell Grammar School, and by 1914 as Chipping Ongar Grammar School. It closed as such in 1940, before the introduction of secondary education under the Education Act 1944 and the Tripartite System.

An earlier private school, which was endowed by a Joseph King in 1678 and funded from rents on houses, was established for "educating, apprenticing and supplying with religious books the poor inhabitants of the parish". By 1882 this endowed school was listed as being for the education children of the Chipping Ongar and Shelley parishes, and had been reorganized in 1869 and enlarged in 1873 to meet requirements of the Elementary Education Act 1870 (33 & 34 Vict. c. 75). By 1894 this school had widened its catchment to include Greensted, and by 1914 to include High Ongar, by which time it had become a Council School. In 1833 there had been seven day schools in Chipping Ongar, one of which was endowed, the others providing education through parent fees. There were also two boarding schools supported at the expense of parents, and two Sunday Schools; one supported by the Church of England, the other by Independent churches.

In 1936, Essex County Council had established the Ongar County Secondary School in a neo-Georgian building fronting Fyfield Road, Shelley. The school expanded in the 1960s when it became Ongar Comprehensive School, but was closed in 1989. Its buildings were demolished to make way for a new residential development and new youth and adult education centres. Ongar Leisure Centre, a joint use sporting facility, was retained. Secondary school children were then bussed to schools in the surrounding towns, particularly Brentwood and Shenfield. Twenty six years later in September 2015, the new secondary education school, The Ongar Academy, opened adjacent to Ongar Leisure Centre on Fyfield Road.

=== Origins ===
In September 2012 a group of local parents and grandparents set up the 'School4Ongar' campaign group, with the aim of establishing a secondary free school in Ongar, Essex. In June 2013, the group secured the backing of local MP, Sir Eric Pickles who said "The lack of a secondary school in Ongar has been an issue for parents and youngsters in the town for many years. With the development which has taken place in and around Ongar recently, there is a convincing argument in favour of a new school in the town which will serve the needs of the local population". In August 2013, the project was accepted onto the New Schools Network charity's Development Programme which provides groups with help needed to develop free school applications, securing both consultancy and financial support for marketing activities. In February 2014, the school was officially named The Ongar Academy, with the name being chosen by a focus group of local parents and children. The Ongar Academy Trust was incorporated on 16 April 2014.

=== Free school application ===
In May 2014 The Ongar Academy Trust submitted an application to the Department for Education to open a 4 form entry (4 F/E) secondary school from September 2015. The Trust indicated parents had registered interest for 867 children of the right age range across the first seven academic years from 2015–16. Over 1,000 members of the community completed a survey with 98.9% supporting the idea of a secondary school in Ongar.

=== Approval and pre-opening ===
On 30 September 2014, Education Secretary Nicky Morgan MP announced that The Ongar Academy had been approved to enter the pre-opening phase, one of 35 new free school applications approved that day, forming part of Wave 7 of the Free Schools programme. The Ongar Academy was one of five schools highlighted in press announcements. An editor's comment in the self-published local community run newspaper, Ongar News, stated in October 2014 that The Ongar Academy had "the backing, and more importantly the trust, of the majority of townsfolk". The Ongar Academy entered the pre-opening phase, announcing the appointment of David Grant as the school's first Headteacher on 29 October 2014 and opening for admissions in November 2014.

According to school reporting, applications had filled its first form in just one week. The statutory consultation, a pre-condition of signing a free school funding agreement, received 137 responses with 122 (91%) agreeing the Secretary of State and The Ongar Academy should enter into a Funding Agreement to allow The Ongar Academy to open. Independent consultants, Place Group, who managed the consultation, recorded "In Place Group’s experience as educational consultants and project managers to over thirty Academy and Free School projects, these findings are unprecedented in terms of the (Ongar) community support for The Ongar Academy Trust’s proposals to open a Free School in the town".

By April 2015, The Ongar Academy had recruited all of the staff required to open the school to Year 7 students.

The Ongar Academy opened on 7 September 2015,

=== Criticism ===
The Ongar Academy has received some criticism. During the pre-application consultation phase Twelve people (1.21% of respondents) stated they were against the establishment of the school, with primary reasons, such as impact on traffic, being unrelated to the proposal to establish a new secondary school. Twelve people disagreed with the proposal to open the school as part of the Statutory Consultation.

The Educating Brentwood Forum, which opposed the opening of nearby Becket Keys Church of England Free School, expressed concerns regarding evidence of need and demand; perceived competition with Brentwood schools; and the School4Ongar group's early visit (among visits to several other schools) to IES Breckland school in Brandon, Suffolk. A small number of local residents expressed concern about the vehicular entrance to the proposed new school.

== Governance ==
Previously a school under the 2010 Free school model, it initially operated as an Academy school, governed by an independent trust, The Ongar Academy Trust. In 2017, after a process of deliberation, the Trust sought multi-academy trust partners from the nearby area. In a process largely led by the Headteacher, the Trust eventually agreed upon forming a new multi-academy trust (Bridge Academy Trust) alongside an established secondary school in nearby Chelmsford, Moulsham High School. The school was then incorporated in October 2017 and The Ongar Academy Trust ceased to operate with the Trust for the school being replaced by a local governing body.

== Admissions ==
The Ongar Academy serves a predominantly rural catchment area, including the civil parish of Ongar (comprising the market town of Chipping Ongar, and Shelley, Marden Ash and Greensted) and surrounding villages such as Fyfield, Moreton, High Ongar, Stanford Rivers and Toot Hill.

== School site ==
On 2 February 2015 Epping Forest District agreed to allow the purchase of playing fields used by Ongar Leisure Centre by the Department for Education, as part of the Academy.

The Ongar Academy initially opened in temporary premises established on disused tennis courts adjacent to Ongar Leisure Centre, Fyfield Road, Ongar, Essex. The premises included three blocks of one and two storey school buildings, accessed through an open decking, and a secure playground area to the rear. The school had initial access to facilities in nearby Ongar Leisure Centre (sports hall, dance studios and swimming pool) and Ongar Youth Centre. The school also used the sports fields to the rear of Ongar Leisure Centre and immediately adjacent to the playground. The main contractor, Elliott UK, had experience providing purpose built permanent, temporary, and relocatable schools and classrooms. Planning permission was granted by Epping Forest District Council for the temporary premises on 17 June 2015 and the premises were handed to the school on 29 July 2015.

In March 2015, The Ongar Academy presented initial artists' impressions of a multimillion-pound new build school which would replace the temporary premises from September 2017. Public consultation on the detailed plans was undertaken in October 2015 and a full planning application was submitted in January 2016. Full planning consent was granted by Epping Forest District Council on 20 April 2016; the breaking the ground ceremony on 15 July 2016 was attended by Eric Pickles. The main Contractor was Kier Group and Planning Consultants, Vincent and Gorbling.

In September 2017, the new buildings were completed on time and on budget. These facilities were formally opened in November 2017 by Michael Foale CBE, (a British Astronaut) and are due to be fully occupied in 2021.

== Recognition ==
On 16 June 2015 the school was subject to a Pre-registration Inspection by Ofsted under Section 99 of the Education and Skills Act 2008. All standard Ofsted inspection criteria were covered with the inspector concluding "The school is likely to meet all the relevant independent school standards when it opens". Revised guidance issued by Ofsted in December 2015 stated "The first inspection of all new schools, including academies, will usually take place within three years of opening. In most instances, we will not select new schools for a first inspection until they are in their third year of operation". The full Ofsted inspection of The Ongar Academy was undertaken in May 2018, after which it received a Grade 2 'Good' rating for overall effectiveness.
