= King Street, Essex =

Hamlet in Essex, England

Coordinates: 51.7059°N 0.2987°E

King Street
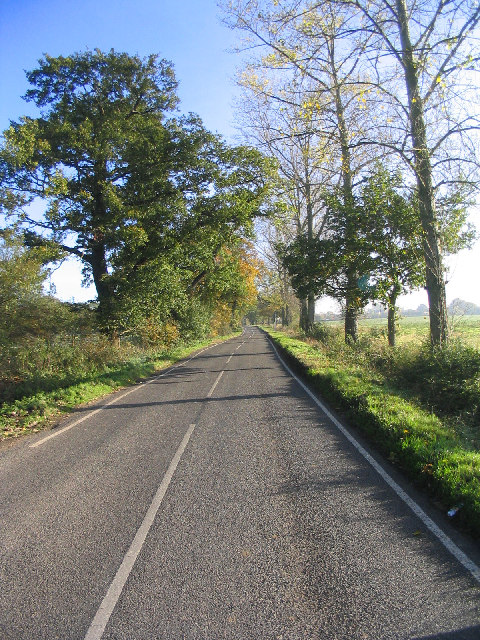
- Tree-lined avenue, King Street, Essex, looking east. King Street is both the name of the road and the small hamlet nearby.

- Location within Essex
- District: Epping Forest
- Shire county: Essex
- Region: East
- Country: England
- Sovereign state: United Kingdom

King Street is a hamlet in the High Ongar civil parish of the Epping Forest district of Essex, England. The hamlet, a linear development along King Street road, is 300 yards (274 m) south of the A414 Harlow-Chelmsford road. King Street is 1.5 miles (2 km) east of the parish village of High Ongar, and less than 1 mile north of the hamlet of Nine Ashes. The county town of Chelmsford is 8 miles (13 km) to the east.
