= Ongar, Essex =

Civil parish in England

Coordinates: 51.703°N 0.244°E

Ongar
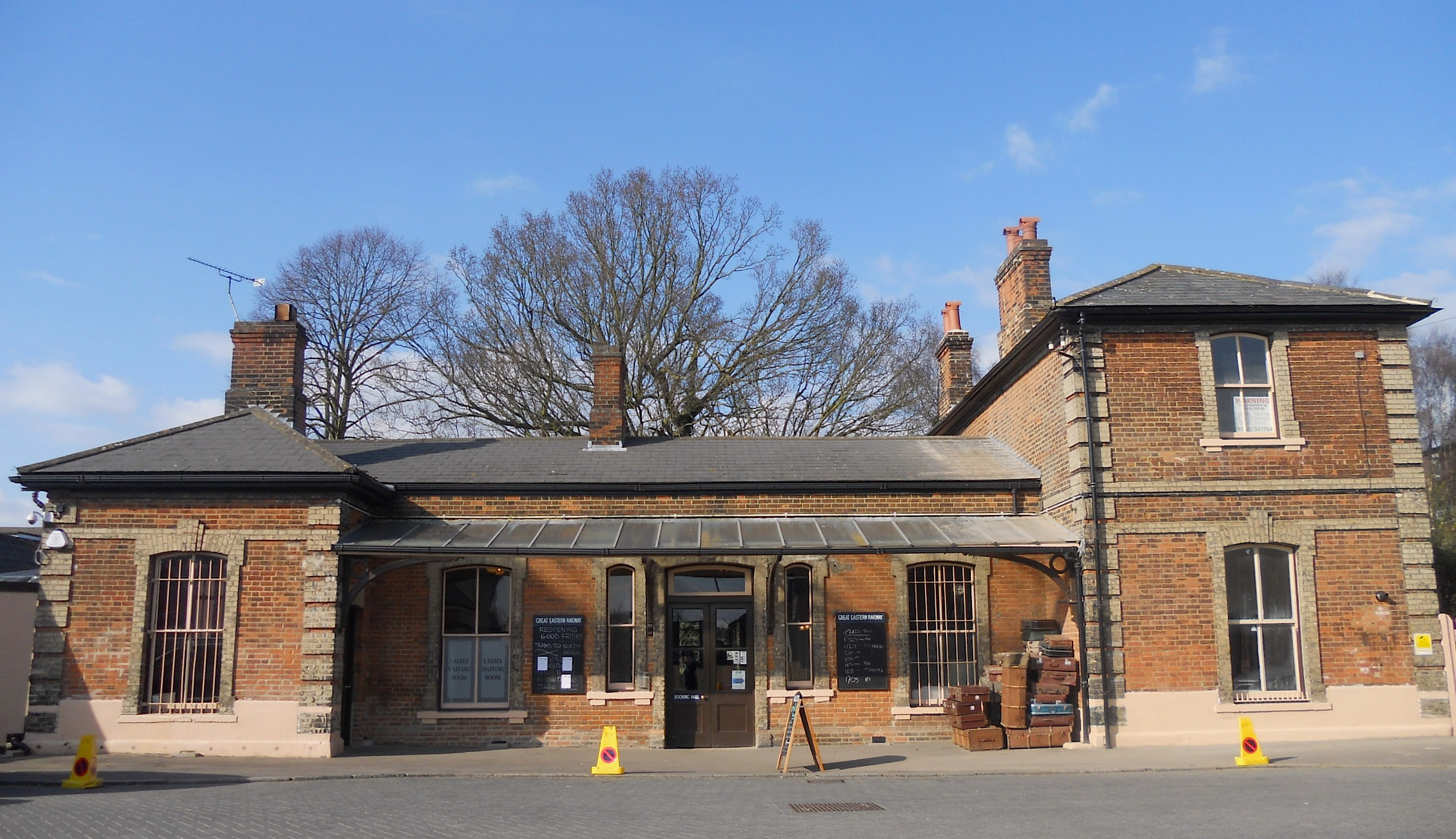
- Ongar railway station, now terminus of the Epping Ongar Railway

- Location within Essex
- Interactive map of Ongar
- Area: 9.02 km^{2} (3.48 sq mi)
- Population: 7,138 (Parish, 2021)
  - Density: 791/km^{2} (2,050/sq mi)
- OS grid reference: TL555035
  - London: 21 mi (34 km) SW
- Civil parish: Ongar
- District: Epping Forest
- Shire county: Essex
- Region: East
- Country: England
- Sovereign state: United Kingdom
- Post town: Ongar
- Postcode district: CM5
- Dialling code: 01277
- Police: Essex
- Fire: Essex
- Ambulance: East of England
- UK Parliament: Brentwood and Ongar
- Website: Ongar Town Council

Ongar is a civil parish in the Epping Forest District of Essex, England. The parish is named after its main settlement of Chipping Ongar and also includes the settlements of Greensted, Greensted Green, Marden Ash, and Shelley. The parish has been declared to be a town by its parish council. The Royal Mail uses Ongar as the name for the post town covering the area; the name Chipping Ongar is not used in official postal addresses. (Note: The only postal address to formally include "Chipping Ongar" is "Chipping Ongar Primary School, Greensted Road, Ongar", where it is part of the building name, not the town name. (Type "Chipping Ongar" into search box.)) Ongar is located 21 miles (34 km) north-east of London and 10 miles (16 km) west of Chelmsford. At the 2021 census the parish had a population of 7,138.

Ongar was a large estate in Saxon times, with its main settlement at High Ongar. The estate fragmented into smaller manors, some of which became parishes, in the 11th and 12th centuries. Following the construction of Ongar Castle after the Norman Conquest of 1066, the market town of Chipping Ongar grew up adjoining the castle. Chipping Ongar overtook High Ongar in population and became a separate parish during the medieval period. The modern parish of Ongar was created in 1965 as a merger of the former parishes of Chipping Ongar, Greensted, and Shelley, along with some territory ceded from High Ongar, which remains a separate parish.

== History ==
The name "Ongar" means "grass land" or "pasture".

The ancient Ongar estate included Bobbingworth, Greensted and Shelley, each of which had become separate manors and parishes by the time of the Norman Conquest. Norton Mandeville subsequently also became a separate parish in the 1180s. The Ongar estate may also have included Moreton and Fyfield to the north and Kelvedon Hatch and Stondon Massey to the south. All these parishes appear to have begun as chapelries to the parish church of St Mary at High Ongar.

Ongar Castle was built shortly after the Norman Conquest, 0.75 miles (1.2 km) south-west of High Ongar on the opposite side of the Roding valley. A church dedicated to St Martin was built adjoining the castle around the same time, and Chipping Ongar was laid out as a new market town adjoining the castle and St Martin's during the 12th century. The new town of Chipping Ongar became a separate parish, after which there were two parishes called Ongar: High Ongar and Chipping Ongar. The territory ceded to the new Chipping Ongar parish was modest, only covering 511 acres (207 hectares) immediately around the castle and town, whereas High Ongar parish retained 4,520 acres (1,829 hectares) covering an extensive rural area. Until the 20th century, High Ongar parish included two significant detached parcels, north of Norton Mandeville and west of Bobbingworth, representing areas that had not been ceded to the newer parishes created from parts of the older Ongar territory.

The modern parish of Ongar was created in 1965 as an amalgamation of the Chipping Ongar, Greensted and Shelley civil parishes in the Epping and Ongar Rural District. In 1974 the parish became part of Epping Forest District.

== Governance ==
There are three tiers of local government covering Ongar, at parish (town), district, and county level: Ongar Town Council, Epping Forest District Council, and Essex County Council. The town council is based at an office on Bansons Way in Chipping Ongar.

Parish councils were given the right to declare their parishes to be a town in 1974. Ongar Parish Council exercised this right in 2006, becoming Ongar Town Council.

== Geography ==
The civil parish includes the following settlements:

- Chipping Ongar
- Greensted
- Greensted Green
- Marden Ash
- Shelley

The shape of the parish is an inverted "L" running from Greensted in the west to Marden Ash to the east, then north to include Chipping Ongar and then Shelley. Ongar is a post town in the CM postcode area.

== Demography ==
At the 2021 census the population of the parish was 7,138. The Office for National Statistics identified two built up areas in the parish, being Chipping Ongar with a population of 3,967, and Shelley with a population of 2,425.

The population of the parish had been 6,251 in 2011, and 6,069 in 2001.

== Education ==
State education in Ongar is provided by Chipping Ongar Primary School (in Chipping Ongar), Ongar Primary School (in Shelley), and The Ongar Academy secondary school.

=== History ===
Ongar Grammar School was a private school for boys which was opened as a boarding school in 1811 by William Stokes M.A. By 1845 the school was known as 'Ongar Academy' (not in the post-2010 Academy school sense), by 1874 it was known as a private grammar school, by 1882 as Chignell Grammar School, and by 1914 as Chipping Ongar Grammar School. It closed as such in 1940, before the introduction of secondary education under the Education Act 1944 and the Tripartite System.

An earlier private school, which was endowed by a Mr Joseph King in 1678 and funded from rents on houses, was established for "educating, apprenticing and supplying with religious books the poor inhabitants of the parish". By 1882 this endowed school was listed as being for the education children of the Chipping Ongar and Shelley parishes, and had been reorganized in 1869 and enlarged in 1873 to meet requirements of the Elementary Education Act 1870. By 1894 this school had widened its catchment to include Greensted, and by 1914 to include High Ongar, by which time it had become a Council School. In 1833 there had been seven day schools in Chipping Ongar, one of which was endowed, the others providing education through parent fees. There were also two boarding schools supported at the expense of parents, and two Sunday Schools; one supported by the Church of England, the other by Independent churches.

In 1936, Essex County Council had established the Ongar County Secondary School in a neo-Georgian building fronting Fyfield Road, Shelley. The school expanded in the 1960s when it became Ongar Comprehensive School, but was closed in 1989. Its buildings were demolished to make way for a new residential development and new youth and adult education centres. Ongar Leisure Centre, a joint use sporting facility, was retained. Secondary school children were then bussed to schools in the surrounding towns, particularly Brentwood and Shenfield. Twenty six years later in September 2015, the new secondary education school, The Ongar Academy, with no historic association to any previous Ongar school apart from being built on part of the site of the earlier Ongar County Secondary School in Shelley, opened adjacent to Ongar Leisure Centre on Fyfield Road.

== Transport ==
Since the closure of the Central line between Epping and Chipping Ongar in 1994, there is no longer a daily commuter train service in the parish. The nearest London Underground service to the parish is Epping which is served by the Central line. The closest National Rail service is from Brentwood, which is served by the Great Eastern Main Line and is operated by Transport for London (TfL).

The former Ongar London Underground station now forms part of the heritage Epping Ongar Railway.

== Radio ==
There was a shortwave transmitter at Ongar. See Marconi station and the Imperial Wireless Chain.
