= Norton Mandeville =

Village in Essex, England

Coordinates: 51.7180°N 0.2855°E

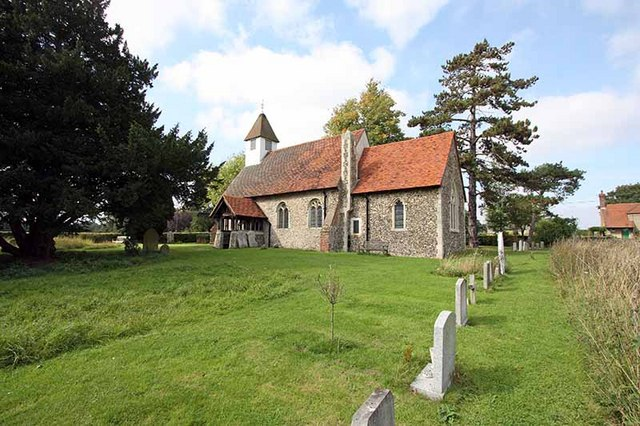
- All Saints' Church

- Location within Essex
- OS grid reference: TL579046
- Civil parish: High Ongar
- District: Epping Forest
- Shire county: Essex
- Region: East
- Country: England
- Sovereign state: United Kingdom
- Post town: ONGAR
- Postcode district: CM5
- Police: Essex
- Fire: Essex
- Ambulance: East of England

Norton Mandeville is a village in the civil parish of High Ongar, in the Epping Forest district of Essex, England. The settlement is at the north of the parish, and less than 1 mile north from the A414 Harlow to Chelmsford road.

Norton Mandeville was anciently part of the parish of High Ongar. A church dedicated to All Saints was built at Norton Mandeville in the 12th century, and Norton Mandeville became a separate parish in the 1180s.

The parish of Norton Mandeville included both the small settlement of Norton Mandeville and Norton Heath to the east. The parish was abolished in 1968 and its area absorbed back into High Ongar parish from which it had been separated nearly eight centuries earlier. At the 1961 census (the last before the abolition of the civil parish), Norton Mandeville had a population of 187.

All Saints' remains in use as a church, now serving as one of three Anglican churches in the ecclesiastical parish of High Ongar with Norton Mandeville, alongside St Mary's at High Ongar and St James' at Marden Ash.
