= Epping Rural District =

Former local government area in the UK

Coordinates: 51.72°N 0.08°E

Epping
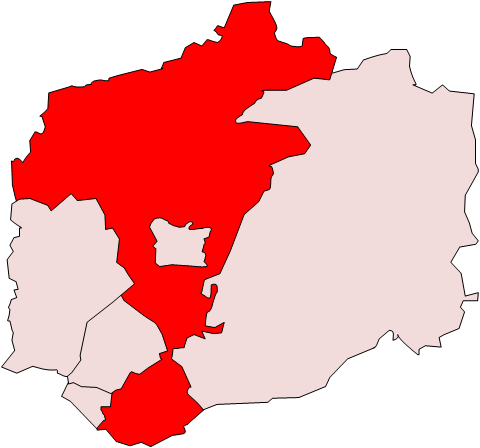
- The district in 1911
- Area
  - 1911: 39,055 acres (158.05 km^{2})
  - 1951: 34,851 acres (141.04 km^{2})
- Population
  - 1901: 12,783
  - 1951: 20,024
- History
  - Created: 1894
  - Abolished: 1955
  - Succeeded by: Harlow Urban District; Epping and Ongar Rural District
- Status: Rural district
  - HQ: Epping

Epping was, from 1894 to 1955, a rural district in the administrative county of Essex, England.

== Formation and boundary changes ==
The district was formed by the Local Government Act 1894 as successor to the Epping Rural Sanitary District. The rural district was governed by a directly elected rural district council (RDC), which replaced the rural sanitary authority that had comprised the poor law guardians for the area. The council's headquarters were in the town of Epping.

Over its existence, the rural district lost territory to new urban districts. In 1896 Epping became a separate urban district, although Epping RDC continued to be based in the town. Loughton and Chigwell were constituted urban districts in 1900 and 1933 respectively.

== Abolition ==
Epping RD was finally abolished when the New Town of Harlow was constituted an urban district in 1955. The remainder of the rural district was merged with the neighbouring Ongar Rural District to form Epping and Ongar Rural District.

== Parishes ==
When established in 1894, Epping RD consisted of sixteen civil parishes. Over the next sixty-one years the number was reduced due to both loss of territory to urban districts and amalgamation of small parishes. On abolition there were twelve parishes:

Parish	Notes
Chigwell	Became a separate urban district in 1933
Epping	Most became a separate urban district in 1896, part constituted as Epping Upland parish
Epping Upland	Created 1896 from the part of Epping not included in urban district. Part included in Harlow UD 1955.
Great Parndon	Part included in Harlow UD 1955.
Harlow	Was enlarged to become Harlow Urban district in 1955.
Latton	Abolished 1949 with area split between Harlow and North Weald Bassett
Little Parndon	Absorbed by Netteswell parish in 1949
Magdalen Laver	
Loughton	Became a separate urban district in 1900
Matching	
Nazeing	
Netteswell	Part included in Harlow UD 1955.
North Weald Bassett	
Roydon	Part included in Harlow UD 1955.
Sheering	
Theydon Bois	
Theydon Garnon	
