= Comitti of London =

British timepiece company

Comitti of London is a British company which designs and manufactures handcrafted timepieces.

Comitti of London was founded in 1845 by Onorato Comitti, an Italian precision instrument maker who moved to England, and started a business designing and manufacturing barometers.

Onorato Comitti opened his first workshop in 1850 alongside other specialist makers in Clerkenwell, London. He produced a number of recording instruments, including mercury and aneroid barometers. Comitti attempted to copyright the text on the face of one of his newly designed barometers, but was turned down, and the resulting court case is used as an example in books about copyright law.

During the late Victorian period that company expanded its line to include clocks, receiving the Diploma of Honour for the company’s workmanship in 1888.

In 1903 the company's premises were destroyed by fire.

For Queen Elizabeth II’s Diamond Jubilee, Comitti created an architectural floor clock with an English regulator movement, now in Buckingham Palace.

At 2015 Comitti remains a family-owned business, run by the fifth generation. It continues to manufacture traditional luxury timepieces. Some of the company's older designs have become collector's items.
