= St Martin's Church, Chipping Ongar =

Church in Essex, England

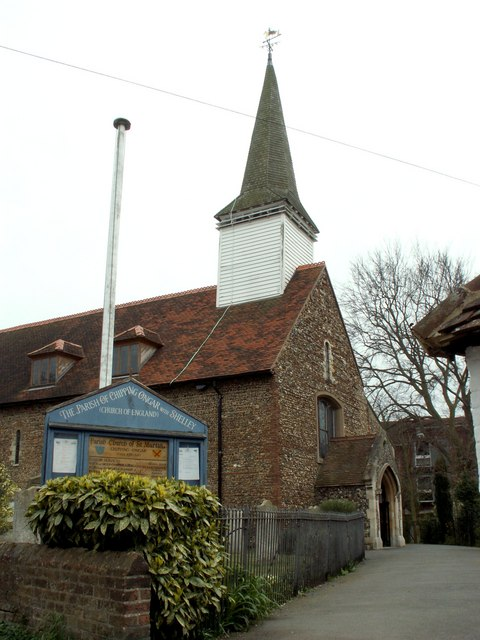
- St Martin's Church, Chipping Ongar
- 51.7039°N 0.2463°E
- Denomination: Church of England
- Website: St Martin's Church

History
- Founded: 11th century
- Dedication: Saint Martin of Tours

Architecture
- Functional status: Parish church
- Heritage designation: Grade I
- Designated: 20 February 1967
- Architectural type: Church

Administration
- Province: Canterbury
- Diocese: Chelmsford
- Archdeaconry: Harlow
- Deanery: Ongar
- Parish: Chipping Ongar with Shelley

Clergy
- Vicar: Reverend Susan Cooper

St Martin's Church is a Church of England parish church in the town of Chipping Ongar in Essex, England.

== History ==
The church dates from the 11th century and is a Grade I listed building
