= Little Parndon =

Coordinates: 51.7709°N 0.0899°E

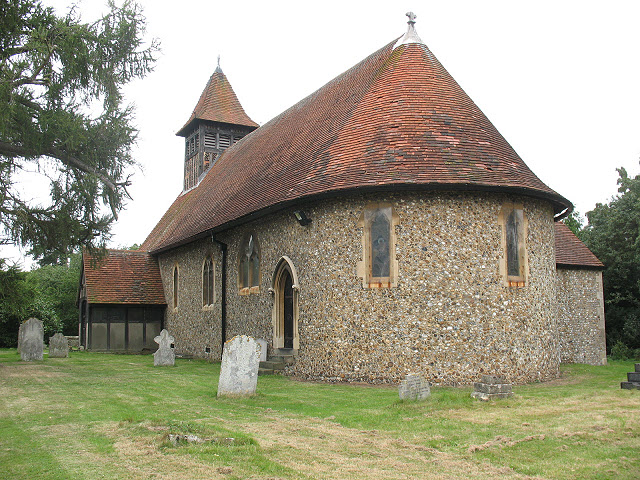
- St Mary's Church

- Location within Essex
- District: Harlow
- Shire county: Essex
- Region: East
- Country: England
- Sovereign state: United Kingdom
- Post town: HARLOW
- Police: Essex
- Fire: Essex
- Ambulance: East of England

Little Parndon is an area of Harlow in Essex, England. Until the mid-20th century, Little Parndon was a rural parish without any significant settlements. In 1946, the civil parish was absorbed into the neighbouring parish of Netteswell. The following year, Harlow was designated as a new town. The area has since then been substantially developed with western parts of the Harlow urban area.

== History ==
The name Parndon is Old English and means "hill growing with pear trees". The name was sometimes recorded as Parringdon.

The Domesday Book of 1086 lists four estates or manors at a vill called Perendua or Perendina in the Harlow Hundred of Essex.

No priest or church was recorded at Parndon in the Domesday Book, but the vill came to form two parishes. References to priests serving Parndon begin from the late 12th century, although it is unclear whether they served Little Parndon, Great Parndon, or both. The area had become two parishes by 1254. Great Parndon and Little Parndon parishes each had detached parts within the area of the other, reflecting their ancient origins as a single territory. These detached parts persisted until 1883 when they were transferred to the parish they actually adjoined. Another detached part of Little Parndon parish between Great Parndon and North Weald Bassett persisted until 1946.

Little Parndon's parish church is dedicated to St Mary. The church was rebuilt in 1868. The church stood adjoining a medieval moated manor house called Parndon Hall. The manor house was rebuilt multiple times before finally being demolished when the site was used to build the Northern and Eastern Railway in the early 1840s.

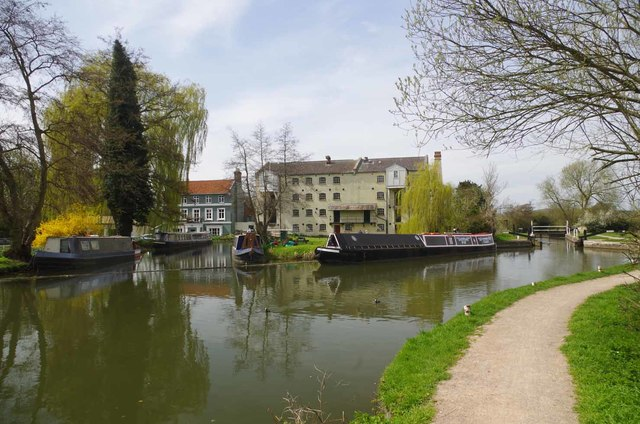
Little Parndon Watermill

In the early 20th century, Little Parndon was described as a village. There was no significant built up area as such; there was a row of houses next to the church, and the rest of the parish was scattered buildings. These included Little Parndon Watermill (also known as Parndon Mill) on the Stort Navigation at the northern end of the parish, and the parkland of Parndon Hall, built in 1867, to the south.

When elected parish and district councils were established in 1894, Little Parndon was included in the Epping Rural District. The population of the parish was too low to have a parish council, and so Little Parndon had a parish meeting instead. On 1 April 1946, the civil parish was abolished and its area absorbed into the neighbouring parish of Netteswell, with the exception of the detached part which went to North Weald Bassett. At the 1931 census (the last before the abolition of the civil parish), Little Parndon had a population of 128.

In 1947, Little Parndon was within the area designated for the new town of Harlow, and the area of the pre-1946 parish has been extensively developed as part of Harlow since then. The grounds of Parndon Hall were developed as the Princess Alexandra Hospital. The parish of Netteswell, which Little Parndon had become part of in 1946, was itself abolished in 1955 when the parish of Harlow was enlarged to cover the whole development area for the new town and converted into an urban district. Little Parndon has been administered as part of Harlow since 1955.
