= Great Parndon =

Area of Harlow, Essex, England

Coordinates: 51.7573°N 0.0787°E

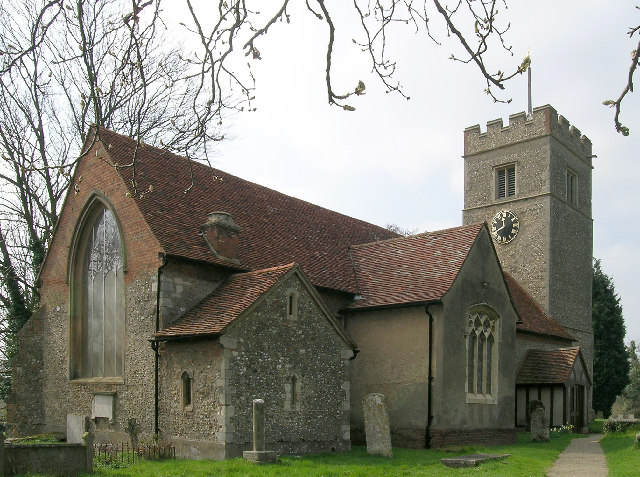
- St Mary's Church

- Location within Essex
- OS grid reference: TL435085
- District: Harlow
- Shire county: Essex
- Region: East
- Country: England
- Sovereign state: United Kingdom
- Post town: HARLOW
- Postcode district: CM19
- Dialling code: 01279
- Police: Essex
- Fire: Essex
- Ambulance: East of England
- UK Parliament: Harlow

Great Parndon is an area of Harlow in Essex, England. Until the mid-20th century, Great Parndon was a rural parish comprising a number of scattered hamlets. In 1947, the parish was included in the designated area for the new town of Harlow. The area has since then been substantially developed with western parts of the Harlow urban area. The parish was formally abolished in 1955 when its area was absorbed into Harlow's administrative area.

== History ==
The name Parndon is Old English and means "hill growing with pear trees".

Great Parndon and neighbouring Little Parndon formed a single vill called Parndon in Saxon times. The vill was in fragmented ownership by the time of the Norman Conquest. The Domesday Book of 1086 records Parndon as "Perendua" within the Harlow hundred of Essex. At that time, Parndon was recorded as being split between four different owners.

No priest or church was recorded at Parndon in the Domesday Book, but the vill came to form two parishes. References to priests serving Parndon begin from the late 12th century, although it is unclear whether they served Great Parndon, Little Parndon or both. Great Parndon had certainly become a separate parish by 1254. Great Parndon and Little Parndon parishes each had detached parts within the area of the other, reflecting their ancient origins as a single territory. These detached parts persisted until 1883 when they were transferred to the parish they actually adjoined. Great Parndon's parish church, dedicated to St Mary, largely dates from the 15th century, although the south door appears to be a 13th century remnant of an earlier building.

The parish had population of 41 in 1524–25. In 1622, there were 71 houses between the two parishes of Great and Little Parndon, with most names attributed to Great Parndon, given that Little Parndon was small and sparsely populated. The population of Great Parndon rose slowly from 300 in 1801 to 534 in 1891, reaching 576 in 1921, falling to 504 in 1931, then rising to 684 in 1951, by which time the building of Harlow town had begun.

It was part of the Epping Poor Law Union and was within the Epping rural sanitary district. In 1894 it became part of Epping Rural District. In 1934 it gained a small part of the parish of Eastwick, Hertfordshire.

The civil parish of Great Parndon was abolished on 1 April 1955. It was mostly incorporated in the parish and new urban district of Harlow, while small areas in the south-east and south-west were transferred to Roydon, Epping Upland, and North-Weald Bassett.
