= Netteswell =

Coordinates: 51.7712°N 0.1045°E

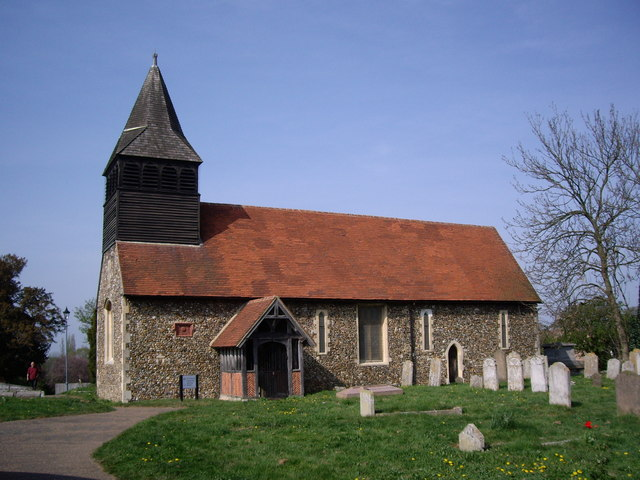
- Former St Andrew's Church, now a study centre

- Location within Essex
- Area: 2.452 km^{2} (0.947 sq mi)
- Population: 8,412 (Ward, 2021)
  - Density: 3,431/km^{2} (8,890/sq mi)
- District: Harlow
- Shire county: Essex
- Region: East
- Country: England
- Sovereign state: United Kingdom
- Police: Essex
- Fire: Essex
- Ambulance: East of England

Netteswell is a suburb of Harlow in Essex, England. Until the mid-20th century, Netteswell was a rural parish with a number of small settlements and scattered houses, with the two main settlements being Netteswell Cross in the north and Tye Green in the south. The parish church, dedicated to St Andrew, stood adjoining the manor house of Netteswellbury in the centre of the parish. In 1947, Netteswell was included in the designated area for the new town of Harlow. The area has since then been substantially developed. The civil parish of Netteswell was abolished in 1955, when the area was absorbed into Harlow's administrative boundaries. The name Netteswell is now used for one of the wards of Harlow, covering a smaller area than the pre-1955 parish. At the 2021 census, the ward had a population of 8,412.

== Toponymy ==
The name Netteswell comes from the Anglian dialect of Old English and means the stream (wella) of someone called Nethel. The name was historically sometimes recorded as Nettleswell or Netswell.

== History ==
The manor of Netteswell, also known as Netteswellbury, was given to the monastery of Waltham Abbey in 1060. A church is known to have existed at Netteswell by 1177, with its parish covering the same area as the manor. The oldest surviving parts of the former parish church, which was dedicated to St Andrew, date from the 13th century. It is a Grade I listed building and is now used as a study centre.

The manor house of Netteswellbury was demolished around 1820 and replaced by a smaller farmhouse on a neighbouring site. A number of 15th-century barns survive at Netteswellbury, one of which is both a Grade II* listed building and a Scheduled Ancient Monument. The barns now form part of the same study centre as the adjoining former church.

At the northern end of the parish, Burnt Mill railway station opened in 1841 on the Northern and Eastern Railway from London to Bishop's Stortford, which was later extended to Cambridge.

Following the designation of Harlow as a new town in 1947, the Netteswell area was extensively developed. The small Burnt Mill station was rebuilt at a much larger scale to become the main station for the new town; it was renamed Harlow Town when the rebuilt station opened in 1960.

=== Administrative history ===
The parish of Netteswell formed part of the Harlow Hundred of Essex. When elected parish and district councils were established in 1894, Netteswell was given a parish council and included in the Epping Rural District.

In 1946, the parish was enlarged to take in the area of the neighbouring parish of Little Parndon, which was abolished. In 1947, Harlow was designated a new town, with its designated area covering most of the enlarged parish of Netteswell. The southern end of the parish that lay outside the designated area for the new town was transferred to the parish of North Weald Bassett in 1949. In 1955, Netteswell parish was abolished and its area absorbed into the parish of Harlow, which also became an urban district at the same time. At the 1951 census (the last before the abolition of the civil parish), Netteswell had a population of 855.

Netteswell has been administered as part of Harlow since 1955; the Harlow Urban District was replaced by a non-metropolitan district called Harlow covering the same area in 1974.
