= Molecatcher =

Person who traps or kills moles

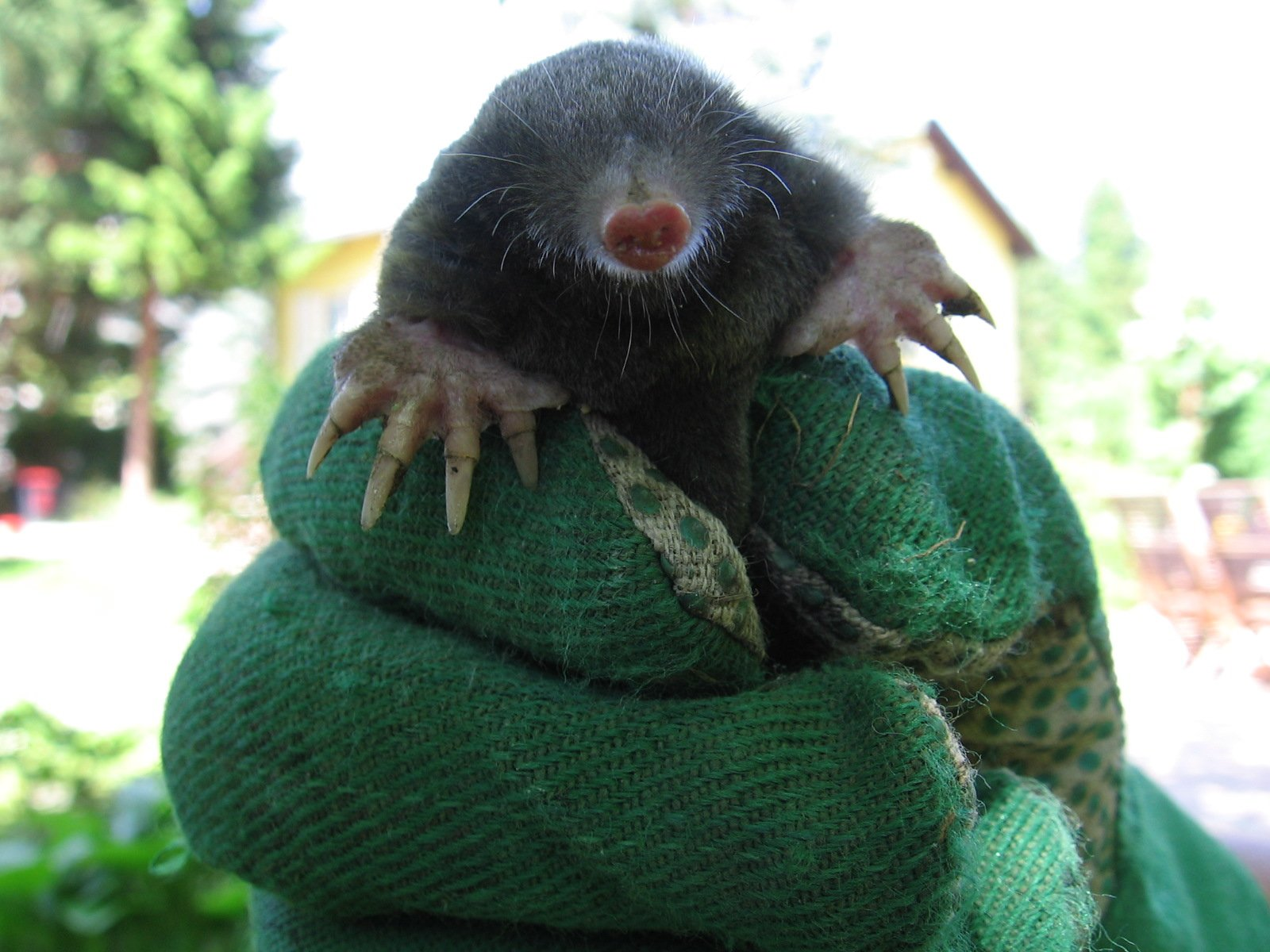
A captured mole

A molecatcher is a person who traps or kills moles in places where they are considered a nuisance to crops, lawns, sportsfields or gardens.

== History of molecatching ==
=== Roman times ===
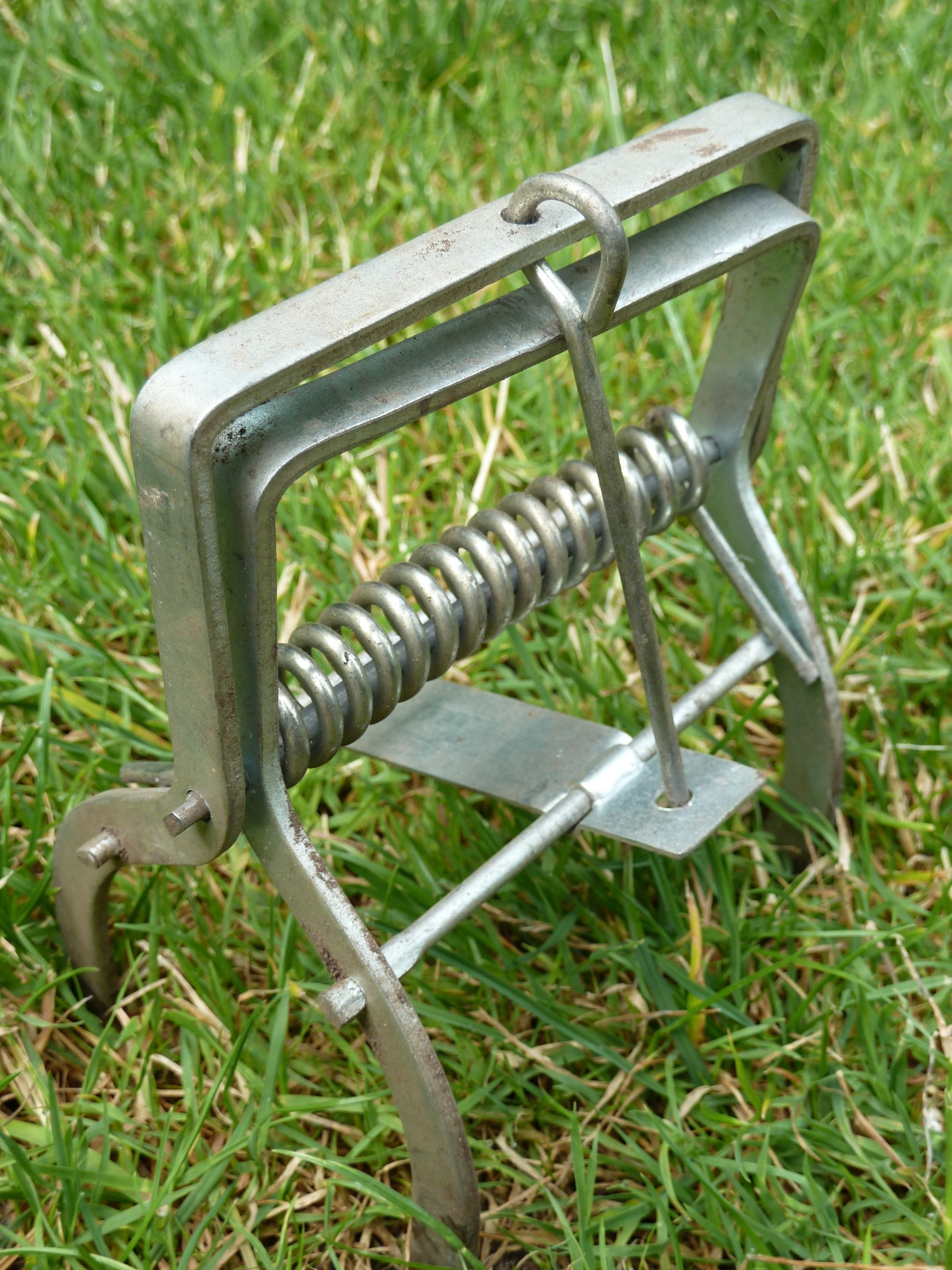
A mole trap

Excavations of ancient Roman sites have revealed earthenware pots that had been set in the ground. The pots were filled with water, and acted as traps for moles.

=== Traditional molecatchers ===
Many early molecatchers set out snares for the moles, taking care to remove human scent from the loops. Over time, traps used to catch and kill moles became more advanced and complicated, incorporating weighted wood or cast iron, and eventually sprung steel.

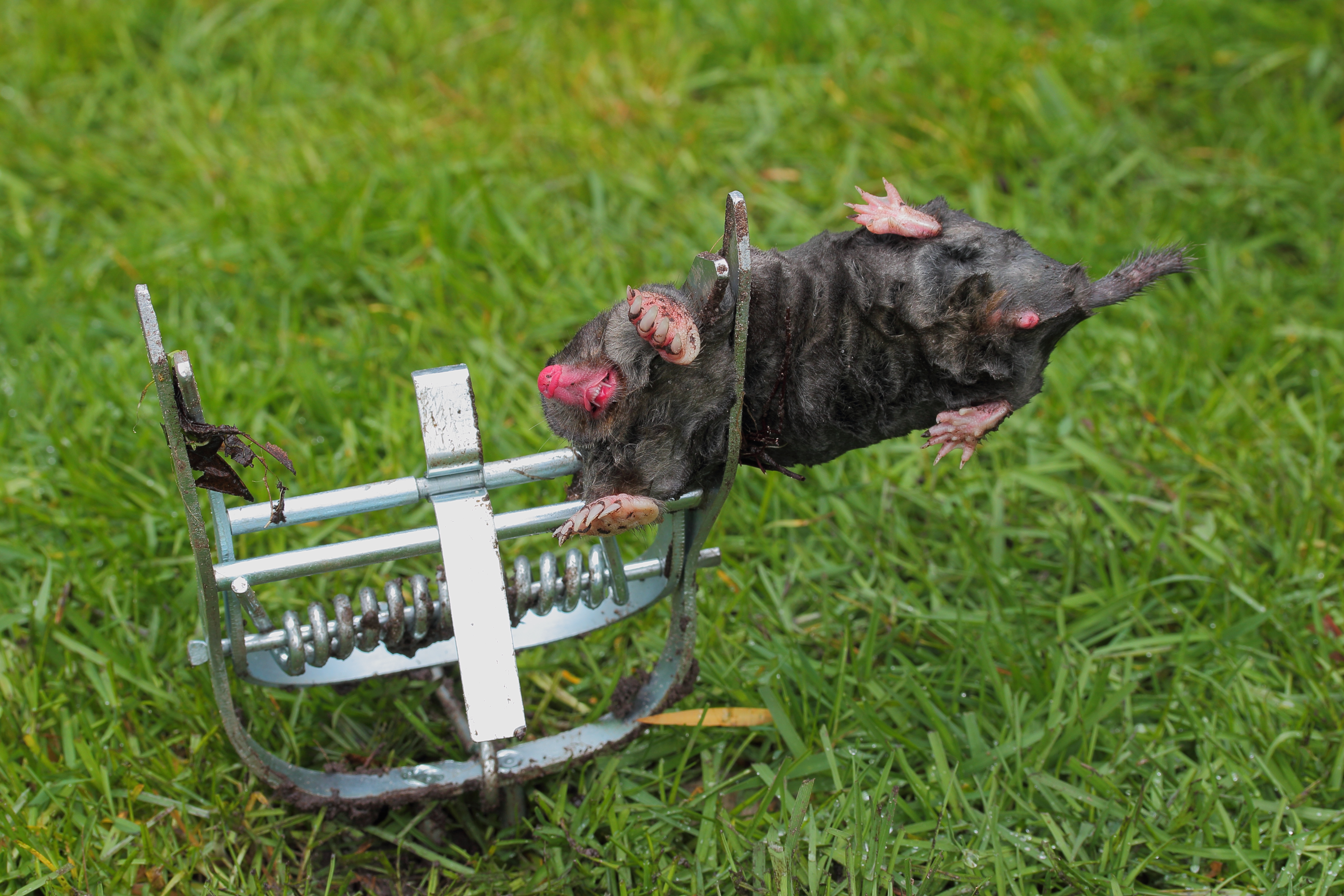
A mole killed by a spring trap

Some itinerant molecatchers travelled from farm to farm. The molecatcher's customers would provide food and lodging, as well as a fee for every mole caught. The molecatcher could also earn additional money by selling the mole pelts to furriers.

=== Modern molecatching ===
In more recent times, traditional molecatching has given way to the use of poison. Poison resulted in moles dying much more quickly and in greater numbers. For some time, strychnine was used to kill moles; its purchase was cheaper than paying molecatchers, but sometimes other animals that shared the environment or interacted with moles were accidentally poisoned as well.

Repellents, including sonic devices, holly leaves, moth balls, garlic and castor oil have not proven successful in preventing damage caused by moles.

==== In the United Kingdom ====
The value of mole pelts was subject to the vagaries of fashion. In 1903, a furrier in Leicester was offering £1 per hundred, in 1926, the price was 12s 6d (62.5p) per dozen. By the 1930s, only a few pence per pelt was being paid. Some molecatchers were full time. In 1875, the town of Out Rawcliffe was advertising for a molecatcher for a term of fourteen years. In Windsor Great Park the molecatcher was said to receive £1 per week in 1910. In 2002, Victor Williamson, the molecatcher for the Sandringham, received a Royal Warrant. Following the withdrawal of the poison from the market in 2006, the use of strychnine is no longer an approved method of control in the UK. Fumigation with products based on aluminium phosphide (Trade names 'Talunex' and 'Phostoxin') is still an approved method of control, but may be carried out only by fully trained operatives.

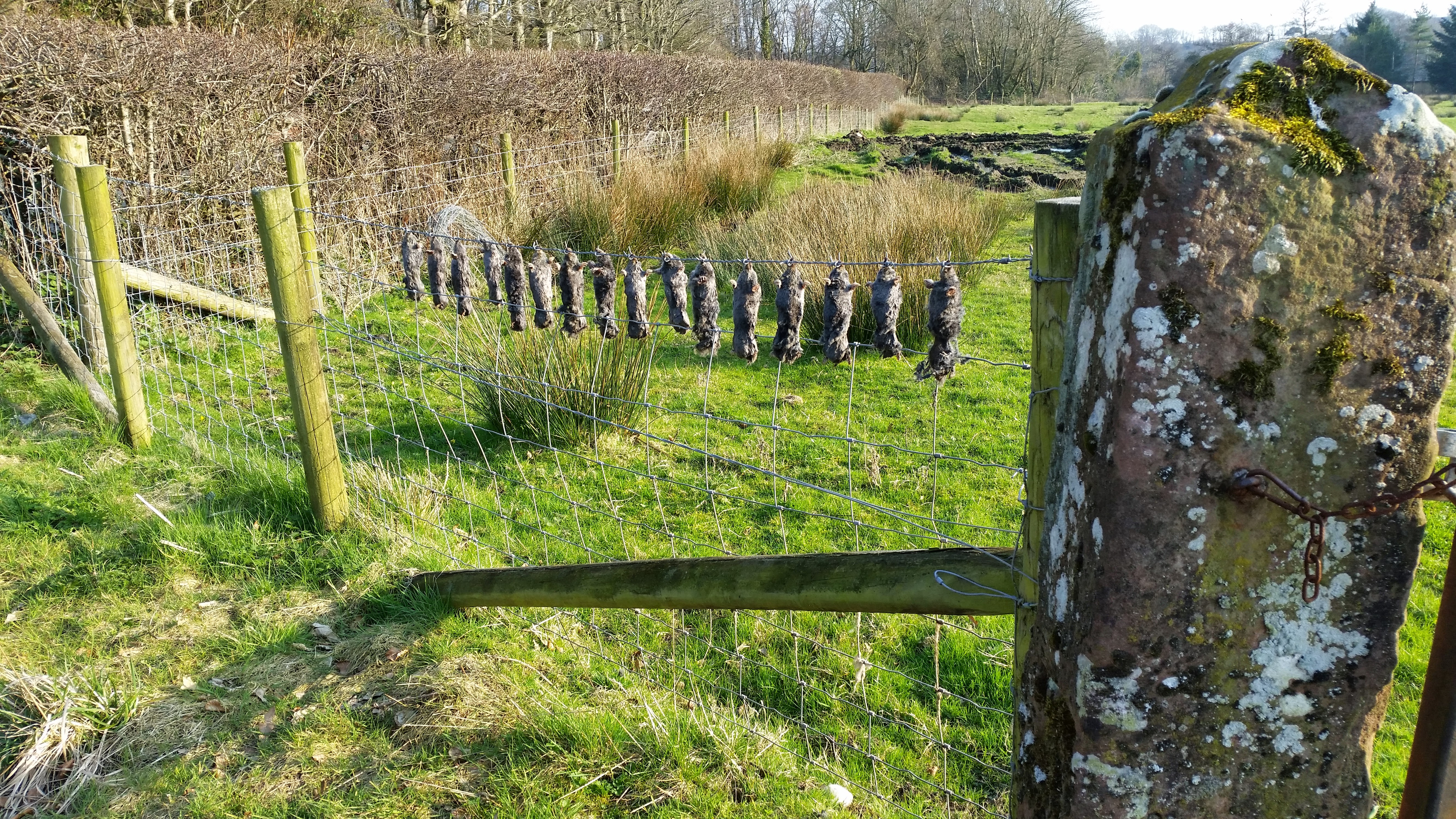
Dead moles traditionally hung on a fence after being caught.

Since the removal of strychnine from the UK market, there has been a revival of traditional molecatching methods in Britain. Modern traditional mole catchers use traps, and usually charge a 'per-mole' fee, as their predecessors often did. The price charged reflects the fact that there is no longer a market for mole pelts.

== Bibliography ==
- Atkinson, Rob (2013). Moles. Whittet Books. ISBN 9781873580868.
- Bowles, Bill (1986). Memoirs of a Fenland Molecatcher. Bowles. ISBN 978-0902436404.
- Randell, Arthur (1970). Fenland Molecatcher. Routledge & Kegan Paul. ISBN 0710068026.
- Smith, Guy N. (1980). Moles and Their Control. Saiga Publishing. ISBN 0904558827.
