= Ongar Rural District =

Former local government area in the UK

Coordinates: 51.70°N 0.25°E

Ongar
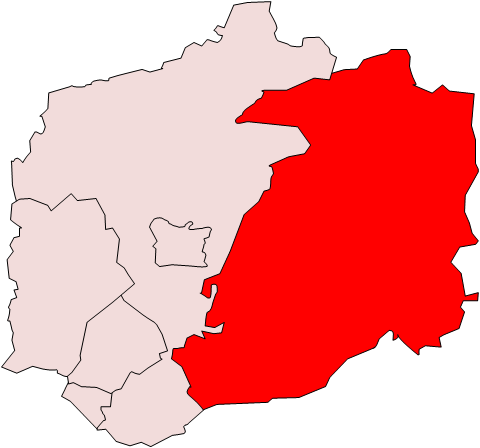
- The district in 1911
- Area
  - 1911: 47.236 acres (191,160 m^{2})
  - 1951: 47,234 acres (191.15 km^{2})
- Population
  - 1901: 10,044
  - 1951: 14,866
- History
  - Created: 1894
  - Abolished: 1955
  - Succeeded by: Epping and Ongar Rural District
- Status: Rural district
  - HQ: Chipping Ongar

Ongar Rural District was a local government district in Essex, England from 1894 to 1955. It included the small town of Chipping Ongar and the parishes surrounding it.

It was abolished in 1955 and combined with part of Epping Rural District to create Epping and Ongar Rural District.
