= Ongar Castle =

Castle in Chipping Ongar, Essex, England

Coordinates: 51.7049294°N 0.2481300°E

- Chipping Ongar, Essex, England
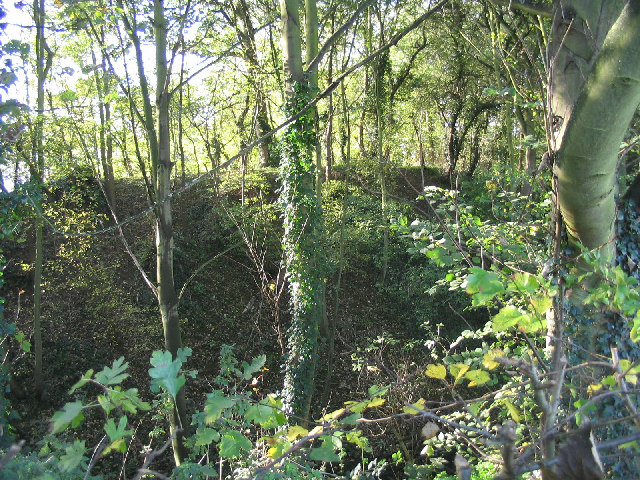
- Earthworks of Ongar Castle in 2005

Site information
- Type: Motte-and-bailey
- Open to the public: Free access
- Condition: Earthworks only

Site history
- Built: c. 1086
- Built by: Eustace II of Boulogne
- In use: c. 1086-between 1558–1603, then c. 1579-1774
- Materials: Stone; Timber; Earth
- Demolished: between 1558–1579, then 1774

Ongar Castle, or Chipping Ongar Castle, is a late 11th- or early 12th-century motte and bailey castle in Chipping Ongar, Essex, England. Only the earthworks and a single block of masonry survive today.

== History ==
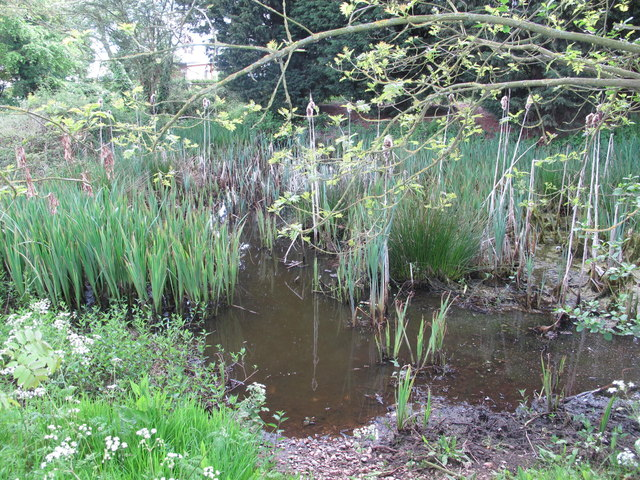
The wet ditch of the outer bailey of Ongar Castle in 2014

The castle may have been built by Count Eustace II of Boulogne, who obtained the manor of Ongar in 1086. A stone tower was built in 1150 and was visited by King Henry II in 1157, when it was held by Richard de Lucy.

A stone keep was built on top of the motte around 1086, which was confiscated by Richard III in November 1483 after he had Henry Stafford, 2nd Duke of Buckingham executed for treason, and then was later given by Henry VIII to William Morice in 1541, but this was pulled down by Morice sometime between 1558 and 1579, and he had it replaced by a brick building, itself destroyed in the 18th century. The motte itself is now covered with trees and is in private ownership, but can be seen from a public footpath that starts at the north end of the High Street.

A stone manor house was also built on the site of Ongar Castle by William Morice, where Elizabeth I was entertained in 1579; the manor house was eventually demolished in 1774 and was replaced by a summer house. Traces of the summer house remain to this day.

In 1881, excavations on the site discovered four flint arches and a large block of masonry which probably supported by a post a flooring above; a Saxon spearhead was also discovered.

== Description ==
The motte or mound is about 70 metres in diameter at the base and is surrounded by a wet ditch up to 15 metres wide. A kidney-shaped inner bailey is to the west of the motte and there is a second bailey to the east. The remains of a town enclosure embankment extend to the west.

== See also ==
- List of castles in Essex
