= Norton Heath =

Hamlet in Essex, England

Coordinates: 51.715°N 0.3174°E

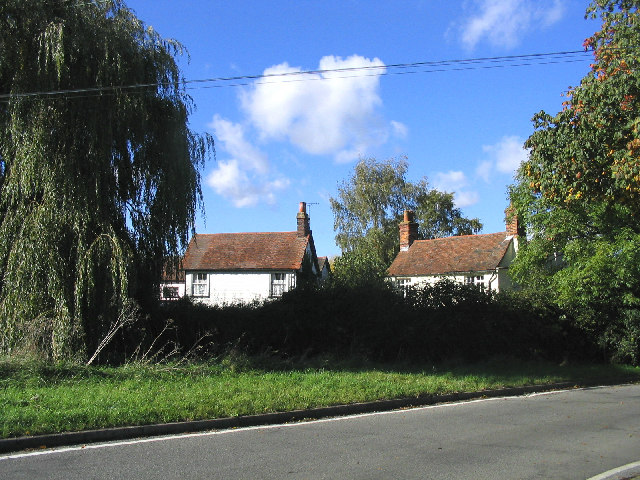
- Cottages at Norton Heath

- Location within Essex
- OS grid reference: TL601043
- Civil parish: High Ongar
- District: Epping Forest
- Shire county: Essex
- Region: East
- Country: England
- Sovereign state: United Kingdom
- Post town: Ingatestone
- Postcode district: CM4
- Police: Essex
- Fire: Essex
- Ambulance: East of England

Norton Heath is a hamlet in the High Ongar civil parish, and the Epping Forest District of Essex, England. The settlement is at the northeast of the parish and on the north side of the Harlow to Chelmsford A414 road.
