= High Ongar =

Village in Essex, England

Coordinates: 51.708949°N 0.264273°E

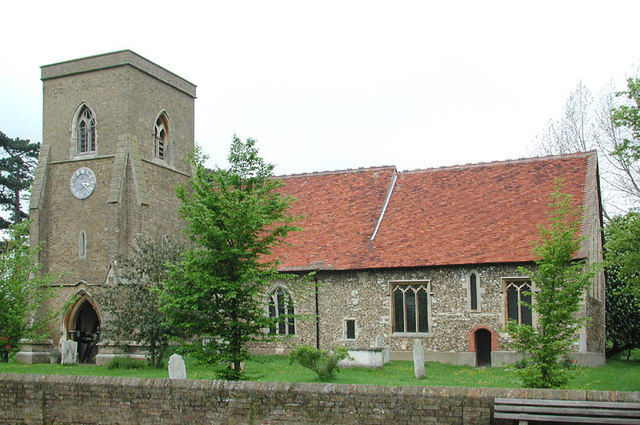
- St Mary's Church, High Ongar

- Location within Essex
- Interactive map of High Ongar
- Population: 1,427 (Parish, 2021)
- Civil parish: High Ongar
- District: Epping Forest
- Shire county: Essex
- Region: East
- Country: England
- Sovereign state: United Kingdom
- Post town: ONGAR
- Postcode district: CM5
- Dialling code: 01277
- Police: Essex
- Fire: Essex
- Ambulance: East of England
- UK Parliament: Brentwood and Ongar

High Ongar is a village and civil parish in the Epping Forest District of Essex, England. It is located 1 mile (1.6 km) north-east of Chipping Ongar, 8 miles (13 km) west of Chelmsford and 6 miles (10 km) north-west of Brentwood. As well as the village of High Ongar itself the parish also covers extensive rural areas, including the smaller settlements of Norton Mandeville and Norton Heath. At the 2021 census the parish had a population of 1,427.

== History ==
In Saxon times there was an extensive estate and parish called Ongar, with its main settlement and parish church at High Ongar. Ongar gave its name to one of the Hundreds of Essex. The ancient Ongar estate included Bobbingworth, Greensted, and Shelley, each of which had become separate manors and parishes by the time of the Norman Conquest. Norton Mandeville subsequently also became a separate parish in the 1180s. The Ongar estate may also have included Moreton and Fyfield to the north and Kelvedon Hatch and Stondon Massey to the south. All these parishes appear to have begun as chapelries to the parish church of St Mary at High Ongar.

Ongar Castle was built in the late 11th century, after the Norman Conquest, 0.75 miles (1.2 km) south-west of High Ongar on the opposite side of the Roding valley. A church dedicated to St Martin was built adjoining the castle around the same time, and Chipping Ongar was laid out as a new market town adjoining the castle and St Martin's during the 12th century. The new town of Chipping Ongar became a separate parish, after which there were two parishes called Ongar: High Ongar and Chipping Ongar. In the 13th century, High Ongar was sometimes called Old Ongar.

The territory ceded to the new Chipping Ongar parish was modest, only covering 511 acres (207 hectares) immediately around the castle and town, whereas High Ongar parish retained 4,520 acres (1,829 hectares) covering an extensive rural area. High Ongar parish included two significant detached parcels, north of Norton Mandeville and west of Bobbingworth, representing areas that had not been ceded to the newer parishes created from parts of the older Ongar territory. These detached areas of the parish were ceded to Norton Mandeville and Bobbingworth respectively in 1946. In 1965, the parish ceded the Marden Ash area to a new parish called Ongar covering Chipping Ongar. In 1968, Norton Mandeville was absorbed back into the parish of High Ongar from which it had been separated nearly eight centuries earlier.

The current building of St Mary's Church dates back to the mid-12th century, although it was extended and restored in the 19th century. Thomas Chase, former Lord Chancellor of Ireland, Master of Balliol College and Chancellor of Oxford (died 1449) spent his last years as vicar here.

The oldest part of High Ongar village along The Street is designated as a conservation area. The oldest surviving house in the village is the timber-framed and weather-boarded building immediately east of the church, known as Post Office Cottages, which was originally a hall house and dates back to the 15th century. In the 18th century the east wing of the building housed the village lock-up.

Other listed buildings in the conservation area include: High Ongar Primary School (1871); the Forrester's Arms (late 18th century); the Cucina Italiana (opened in September 2014) formerly The Red Lion (mid-17th century); Sanuk Thai restaurant (mid-17th century) formerly the Rectory built in 1767 by Edward Earle; and Nos.1, 2 and 3 Blacksmiths' cottages (late 17th century).

== Governance ==
There are three tiers of local government covering High Ongar, at parish, district, and county level: High Ongar Parish Council, Epping Forest District Council, and Essex County Council. The parish council meets at the village hall on Mill Lane.
