= Marden Ash =

Coordinates: 51.6969°N 0.24361°E

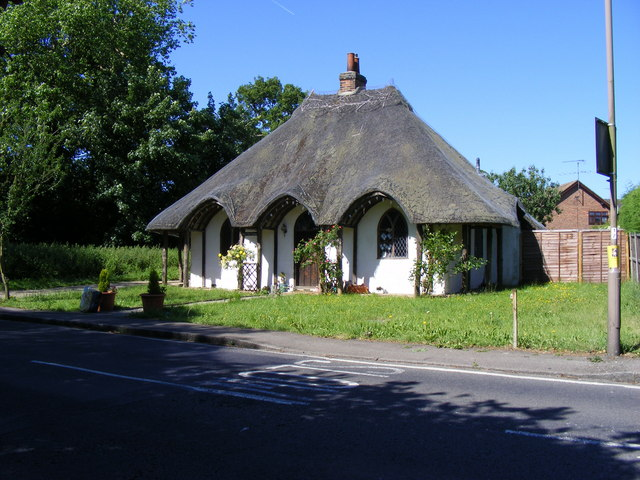
- Thatched cottage at Marden Ash

- Location within Essex
- OS grid reference: TL551021
- Civil parish: Ongar
- District: Epping Forest
- Shire county: Essex
- Region: East
- Country: England
- Sovereign state: United Kingdom
- Post town: ONGAR
- Postcode district: CM5
- Police: Essex
- Fire: Essex
- Ambulance: East of England

Marden Ash is an urban settlement in the Ongar civil parish of the Epping Forest District of Essex, England. The settlement, previously a village of High Ongar parish, is contiguous with the small town of Chipping Ongar. It has a Church of England parish church and a pub, the Stag.

In 1882 Marden Ash was a distinct village settlement south from Chipping Ongar, and listed as part of the neighbouring parish of High Ongar. Occupations at the time included two beer retailers, a brewer & maltster company, and a solicitor and clerk to the magistrates. In 1882-83 a stone and flint church was built at Marden Ash, of nave only and with seating for 100. Adjoining the church was a residence for the curate in charge. In the village in 1894 lived two High Ongar JPs, the parish priest, and the minister for the Congregational church. The brewers from 1882 remained, but as Coleclough & Palmer. There was a boys' school, a firm of solicitors, a butcher, and a beer retailer. These professions and occupations remained by 1902, at which time they were joined by a butcher, and by 1914 by two insurance agents, a fishmonger, a coal dealer, a dress maker, a boot maker, and a branch of the National Deposit Friendly Society. The school for boys was now accepting girls. The brewery was now a store for McMullen & Sons Ltd., brewers. Also resident was the collector to the guardians & relieving & vaccination officer for the Ongar Union—poor relief provision set up under the Poor Law Amendment Act 1834.

Marden Ash and its 1883-inaugurated parish Church of St James remained in the ecclesiastical parish of High Ongar after the settlement was alienated to the civil parish of Ongar. The original church was destroyed during the Second World War in 1945 by a V-2 rocket, and was rebuilt in 1957 in stock bricks with a pantile roof to the designs of Essex architect Laurence King (1907-1981).
