= Chipping Ongar =

Town in Essex, England

Coordinates: 51.703°N 0.244°E

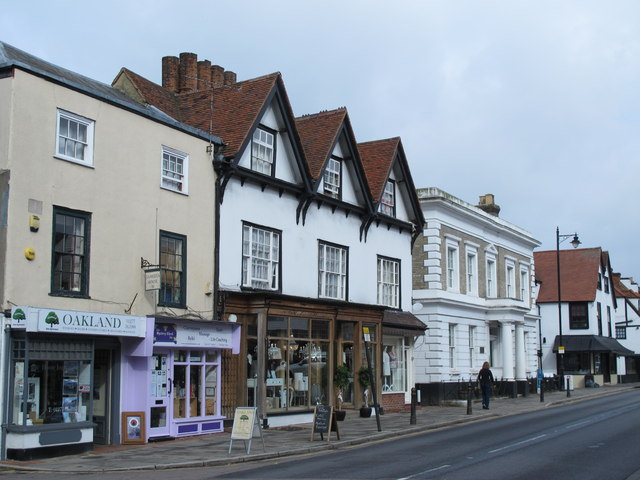
- High Street

- Location within Essex
- Population: 3,967 (Built up area, 2021)
- OS grid reference: TL555035
- Civil parish: Ongar
- District: Epping Forest
- Shire county: Essex
- Region: East
- Country: England
- Sovereign state: United Kingdom
- Post town: ONGAR
- Postcode district: CM5
- Dialling code: 01277
- Police: Essex
- Fire: Essex
- Ambulance: East of England
- UK Parliament: Brentwood and Ongar

Chipping Ongar (/ˈtʃɪpɪŋ ˈɒŋər/) is a market town in the parish of Ongar, in the Epping Forest District of Essex, England. It is located 6 miles (10 km) east of Epping, 7 miles (11 km) south-east of Harlow and 7 miles (11 km) north-west of Brentwood. At the 2021 census the built up area as defined by the Office for National Statistics (which excludes Shelley) had a population of 3,967. The Royal Mail uses Ongar as the name for the post town covering the area; the name Chipping Ongar is not used in official postal addresses. (Note: The only postal address to formally include "Chipping Ongar" is "Chipping Ongar Primary School, Greensted Road, Ongar", where it is part of the building name, not the town name. (Type "Chipping Ongar" into search box.))

== Toponymy ==
The name "Ongar" means "grass land" (cognate with the German word Anger). "Chipping" is from Old English cēping, "a market, a market-place", akin to Danish købing and Swedish köping; the same element is found in other towns such as Chipping Norton, Chipping Sodbury, and Chipping Barnet.

== History ==
In Saxon times there was an extensive estate and parish called Ongar, with its main settlement and parish church at High Ongar. Ongar gave its name to one of the Hundreds of Essex. Ongar Castle was built in the late 11th century, after the Norman Conquest, 0.75 miles (1.2 km) south-west of High Ongar on the opposite side of the Roding valley. A church dedicated to St Martin was built adjoining the castle around the same time, and Chipping Ongar was laid out as a new market town adjoining the castle and St Martin's during the 12th century. The new town of Chipping Ongar became a separate parish, after which there were two parishes called Ongar: High Ongar and Chipping Ongar. The territory ceded to the new Chipping Ongar parish was modest, only covering 511 acres (207 hectares) immediately around the castle and town, whereas High Ongar parish retained 4,520 acres (1,829 hectares) covering an extensive rural area.

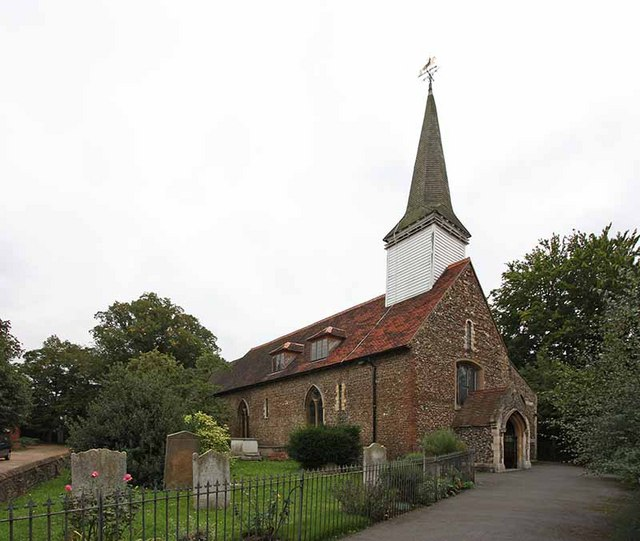
St Martin's Church

St Martin's Church dates back to the late 11th century and shows signs of Norman work. A small window in the chancel is believed to indicate the existence of an anchorite's cell in medieval times. The Gothic Revival architect C. C. Rolfe added the south aisle in 1884. St Andrew's Parish Church in Greensted, 2 miles (3.2 km) west of Ongar, is believed to be the oldest surviving wooden church in the world.

Ongar Castle was demolished between 1558 and 1603.

The missionary and explorer David Livingstone, prior to his expeditions to Africa, lived in Chipping Ongar on the High Street in 1838 to "receive instruction from Rev. Richard Cecil, the Ongar Congregational minister, while training for the ministry".

Ongar railway station was opened in 1865 on a branch line of the Great Eastern Railway. It was built as a through station to allow for a subsequent extension of the line to either Great Dunmow or Chelmsford, but the extensions were never built and Ongar station always served as a terminus. The branch line was transferred to London Underground in 1949 and became part of the Central line. For much of its time as part of the London Underground the last stretch of the line from Epping to Ongar mainly operated as a shuttle service separate from the rest of the line. With green belt policy having been introduced in this area after the Second World War diverting new housing development to other areas, London Underground did not see the economic case for investing in improving this line where usage was low and likely to remain so. The line from Epping to Ongar closed in 1994 and subsequently became a heritage railway, the Epping Ongar Railway.

In 1965 the parish of Chipping Ongar merged with its neighbours Shelley to the north and Greensted to the west to form a new civil parish called Ongar. The new parish also took in the Marden Ash area south of the town from High Ongar parish. Shelley and Greensted, like Chipping Ongar, had also formed part of the ancient Ongar parish before becoming separate parishes in medieval times. At the 1961 census (the last before the abolition of the civil parish), Chipping Ongar had a population of 1,673.

Several of the small private-sector businesses that operated through to the closing decades of the 20th century have closed down or relocated as the economic focus of the region has been redirected, especially since the opening of the M11 motorway in the 1970s, to larger towns in west Essex, especially Harlow and Brentwood. Local planning policies have focused increasingly on residential development, and Ongar, like very many of the smaller towns in the green belt around London, can be viewed primarily as a dormitory town for commuters to London, Brentwood, Harlow and Chelmsford. However, the single-track railway branch line that connected Ongar to Epping (and thereby to London), operated by the London Underground, was closed in 1994. Ongar has a range of retail shops.

Jane Taylor (1783–1824), who wrote the words of "Twinkle, Twinkle, Little Star", is buried at the United Reformed Church in Ongar.

There is a memorial window to Father Thomas Byles in St Helen's Catholic Church. He was parish priest in Chipping Ongar from 1905 and perished on RMS Titanic in 1912, refusing to leave in a lifeboat and staying to pray with the remaining passengers.

Ongar Grammar School in Chipping Ongar, a private school for boys, was opened as a boarding school in 1811 by William Stokes M.A. By 1845 the school was known as 'Ongar Academy' (not connected to an academy school in the 21st-century sense). It was a private grammar school by 1874, Chignell Grammar School by 1882, and was closed in 1940, before the introduction of secondary education under the Education Act 1944 and the Tripartite System.

RAF Chipping Ongar (also known as Willingale) is a former World War II airfield. The airfield is approximately 2 miles (3.2 km) northeast of Chipping Ongar. Opened in 1943, it was used by both the Royal Air Force and United States Army Air Forces. During the War it was used primarily as a bomber airfield. It was closed in 1959 after many years as a reserve airfield.

== Education ==
Chipping Ongar Infant School, originally housed in Victorian school buildings off the High Street (behind Budworth Hall on the site of today's Sainsbury's), was re-located in the mid-1980s, merging with Chipping Ongar Junior School at Greensted Road, at the southern edge of the town, forming Chipping Ongar Primary School. A further primary school, Ongar Primary School, is beyond the northern end of Chipping Ongar in Shelley. Also within Shelley is The Ongar Academy, providing secondary education for Ongar.

== Geography ==
Chipping Ongar is at the convergence of several old roads, between Chelmsford and Epping on an east–west axis and between Dunmow and Chigwell (beyond which is London) on a north–south axis. To the southeast lies Brentwood, on the old road to the former River Thames ferry crossing at Tilbury, though the building in the 1970s of the M11 and M25 motorways means that Ongar is no longer directly on a principal route for petrol tankers (and other less prominent vehicles) travelling from the current Dartford Crossing and the Thames Estuary oil refineries.

The civil parish of Ongar, which has a town council, includes from north-to-south Shelley, Chipping Ongar and Marden Ash, with Greensted to the southwest.

The central part of Ongar High Street comprises a widened main street of the type found in many older English towns whose status as market towns is believed to have originated during the (little chronicled) Saxon period. This historic thoroughfare is lined with over 70 listed buildings and protected by the Chipping Ongar Conservation Area, one of the first to be designated by Essex County Council nearly 50 years ago. The wide high street is used to permit some 'no charge' short-term parking that benefits the local shops. The high street does, however, retain a very narrow stretch, with shops and houses either side very close to the road due to pavements that are barely adequate for two people to pass each other.

Much of the surrounding countryside is occupied by large mechanised farms devoted, for the most part, to arable agriculture. During the 20th century the proximity of London encouraged dairy farming, but the 1960s, 1970s and 1980s were characterised by the removal of hedges and an increase in average field sizes as cattle numbers diminished. This policy was gradually reversed from the 1990s with schemes to replant hedges and trees. The subsoil is of heavy clay, rendering the land too soggy in winter for sheep.

== Transport ==
=== Road ===
Ongar is less than 25 miles (40 km) from Central London, 6 miles (9.7 km) from M11 Junction 7 Harlow and 8 miles (13 km) from M25 J28 Brentwood. The A414 runs from Chelmsford, through Ongar, to Harlow.

Parking restrictions operate throughout the town centre where a 20-minute no-return 2-hour scheme applies. Three pay-and-display car parks are available with a total 530 capacity.

Local residents have previously called for lowering of the current national speed limit between The Mulberry House and the Four Wantz roundabout on the A414 Chelmsford-bound. However, Essex Police's senior traffic management officer, Adam Pipe, deemed lowering the speed limit "inappropriate, as drivers would feel 30 mph (48 km/h) is not adequate and would not comply".

=== Bus ===
The main destinations served by buses are Brentwood, Chelmsford, Harlow and Epping. Routes are operated by Arriva Shires & Essex, First Essex, Trustybus, Stephensons of Essex and SM Coaches. Epping Ongar Railway also operate a limited number of heritage bus services between Ongar and North Weald and also Epping on weekends and Bank Holidays.

=== Railway ===
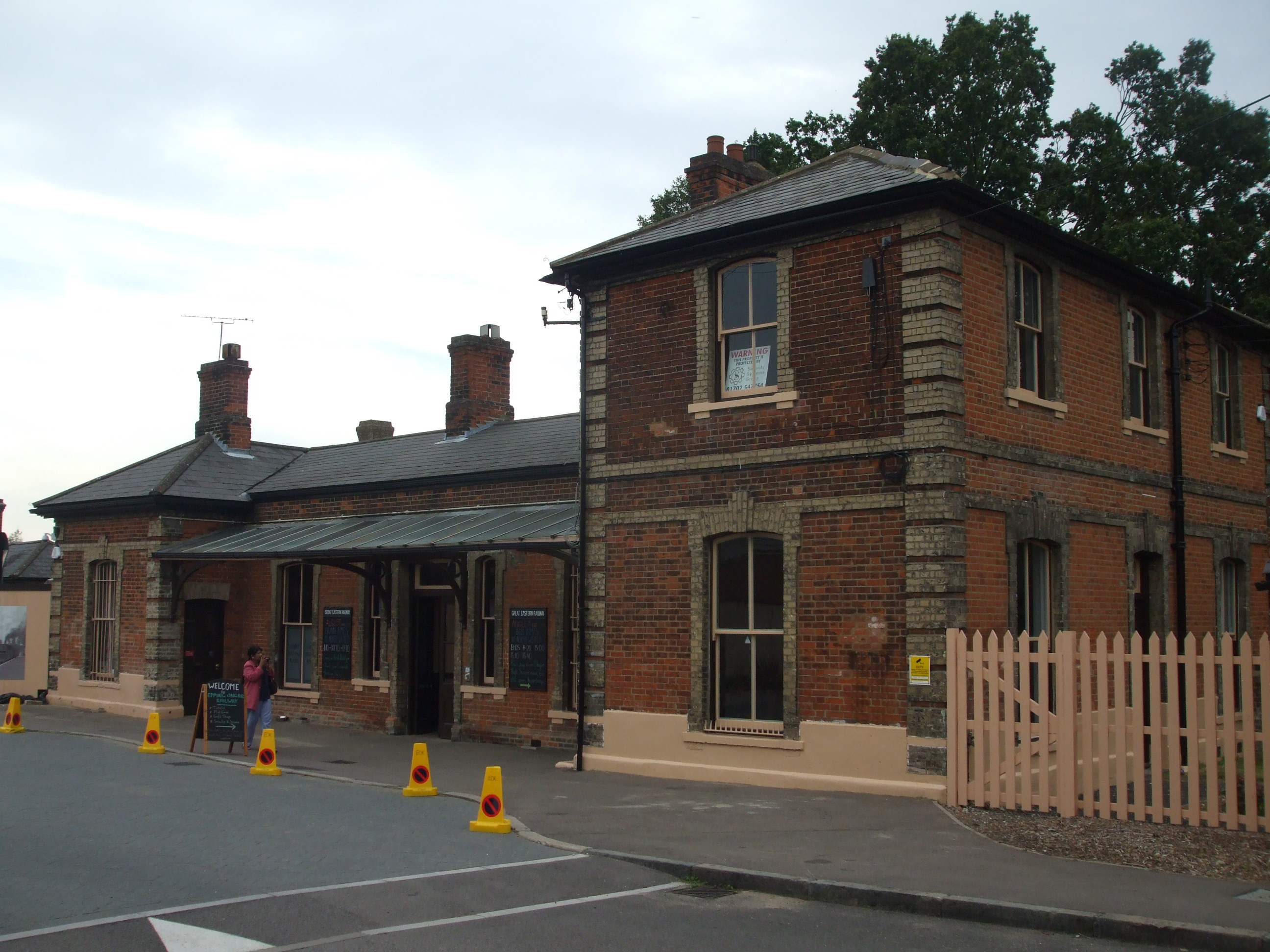
Ongar railway station. Proposals have been made for restarting services to Epping.

Since the closure of the Central line branch between Epping and Ongar in 1994, there is no longer a commuter train service to/from the town. The Epping Ongar Railway operates steam and diesel heritage services on the former Central line track, from North Weald Station on Saturdays, Sundays and Bank Holidays every hour to Ongar Station. It first operated (Sundays and Holidays only) between 2004 and 2007, and then after refurbishment again with the additional Saturday trains from May 2012.

The nearest London Underground station to the town is Epping, 7 miles (11 km) away, the terminus of the Central line. The closest railway station is Brentwood, also 7 miles (11 km) away, which is now served by the Elizabeth line. Harlow Town Station, a National Rail station operated by Greater Anglia, is 9 miles (14 km) to the north west.

== In popular culture ==
YouTube personality Lewis Brindley, of The Yogscast, was born in Chipping Ongar, in 1983.

Wally Hope, experimental philosopher and free festival organiser died at the home of family members in Chipping Ongar on 3 September 1975.

The headquarters of the minor political party the English Democrats is located here.

== Twinning ==
Chipping Ongar is twinned with Cerizay in France.

== Sources ==
- Pearson, Lynn F. Discovering Famous Graves. Princes Risborough: Shire Publications. p. 33.
- Pevsner, Nikolaus (1965). The Buildings of England: Essex. Harmondsworth: Penguin Books.
- Saint, Andrew (1970). "Three Oxford Architects". Oxoniensia. XXXV. Oxfordshire Architectural and Historical Society: 53 ff. Archived from the original on 28 September 2007.
