= Grade II* listed buildings in Epping Forest (district) =

There are over 20,000 Grade II* listed buildings in England. This page is a list of these buildings in the district of Epping Forest in Essex.

== Epping Forest ==
Name	Location	Type	Completed (Note: The date given is the date used by Historic England as significant for the initial building or that of an important part in the structure's description.)	Date designated	Grid ref. (Note: The grid reference is based on the British national grid reference system, sometimes known as OSGB36, used by the Ordnance Survey.) Geo-coordinates	Entry number (Note: The "List Entry Number" is a unique number assigned to each listed building and scheduled monument by Historic England.)	Image
Barn North East of Rookwood Hall	Abbess Beauchamp and Berners Roding, Epping Forest	Moat	15th century	20 February 1967	TL5608411006; 51°46′33″N 0°15′40″E	1111340	Upload Photo
Church of St Botolph	Beauchamp Roding, Epping Forest	Parish Church	Earlier origins	20 February 1967	TL5779309718; 51°45′50″N 0°17′07″E	1165815	Church of St Botolph More images
Fairlands including attached Garden Wall and Pump	Abbess Beauchamp and Berners Roding, Epping Forest	House	15th century	29 June 1984	TL5579411455; 51°46′48″N 0°15′25″E	1165784	Upload Photo
Blake Hall	Bobbingworth, Epping Forest	House	18th century	20 February 1967	TL5387905116; 51°43′25″N 0°13′35″E	1147912	Blake Hall More images
Church of St Germain	Bobbingworth, Epping Forest	Church	13th century	20 February 1967	TL5340805581; 51°43′41″N 0°13′11″E	1124089	Church of St Germain More images
Chigwell School	Chigwell, Epping Forest	Teacher's House	c. 1620	28 June 1954	TQ4415093863; 51°37′30″N 0°04′52″E	1111240	Chigwell School More images
Grange Court	Chigwell, Epping Forest	House	Late 18th century	28 June 1954	TQ4411193673; 51°37′24″N 0°04′50″E	1337265	Grange Court More images
Parish Church of St Mary the Virgin	Chigwell, Epping Forest	Parish Church	12th century	28 June 1954	TQ4410493790; 51°37′28″N 0°04′49″E	1165405	Parish Church of St Mary the Virgin More images
Tailours	Chigwell, Epping Forest	House	Early 18th century	28 June 1954	TQ4434894482; 51°37′50″N 0°05′03″E	1111235	Upload Photo
The Kings Head Hotel	Chigwell, Epping Forest	Jettied House	17th century	28 June 1954	TQ4414293784; 51°37′28″N 0°04′51″E	1111231	The Kings Head Hotel More images
Church of St John the Baptist	Epping, Epping Forest	Parish Church	1889-1891	14 January 1972	TL4595302103; 51°41′55″N 0°06′38″E	1337450	Church of St John the Baptist More images
Epping Place	Epping, Epping Forest	House	Before 1706	7 November 1949	TL4537801621; 51°41′40″N 0°06′07″E	1337460	Upload Photo
Church of All Saints	Epping Upland, Epping Forest	Parish Church	13th century	20 February 1967	TL4439104510; 51°43′15″N 0°05′20″E	1111168	Church of All Saints More images
Parvills	Epping Upland, Epping Forest	House	17th century	22 February 1952	TL4243103917; 51°42′57″N 0°03′37″E	1111164	Parvills More images
Bridge House	Dunmow Rd, Fyfield, Epping Forest	House	Late 16th century	7 April 1983	TL5714007112; 51°44′26″N 0°16′28″E	1337246	Upload Photo
Church of St Nicholas	Fyfield, Epping Forest	Parish Church	12th century	20 February 1967	TL5725406760; 51°44′15″N 0°16′34″E	1337250	Church of St Nicholas More images
Dame Anna's Farmhouse	Norwood End, Fyfield, Epping Forest	Farmhouse	Early 16th century and earlier	20 February 1967	TL5645608850; 51°45′23″N 0°15′55″E	1166177	Upload Photo
Hales Farmhouse	Norwood End, Fyfield, Epping Forest	Farmhouse	Mid 14th century	29 June 1984	TL5599309290; 51°45′38″N 0°15′32″E	1111318	Upload Photo
Mashams	High Laver, Epping Forest	House	Late C16/Early 17th century	26 April 1984	TL5190409066; 51°45′35″N 0°11′59″E	1337579	Upload Photo
Parish Church of All Saints	High Laver, Epping Forest	Parish Church	Late 12th century	20 February 1967	TL5274608673; 51°45′21″N 0°12′42″E	1123935	Parish Church of All Saints More images
Church of All Saints	Norton Lane, High Ongar, Epping Forest	Church	12th century	29 June 1984	TL5799504587; 51°43′04″N 0°17′09″E	1111300	Church of All Saints More images
Norton Mandeville Manor	Norton Heath, High Ongar, Epping Forest	House	1613	29 June 1984	TL6009704415; 51°42′56″N 0°18′58″E	1146850	Norton Mandeville Manor More images
Abridge Motor Spares; Robert Chappell, Butcher	Abridge, Lambourne, Epping Forest	House	Late 16th century	29 May 1984	TQ4663196799; 51°39′03″N 0°07′05″E	1165855	Abridge Motor Spares; Robert Chappell, Butcher
Lambourne Place	Lambourne, Epping Forest	House	c. 1740	27 August 1952	TQ4815197018; 51°39′09″N 0°08′25″E	1165788	Lambourne Place More images
Parish Church of St Mary and All Saints	Lambourne, Epping Forest	Parish Church	12th century	20 February 1967	TQ4785996093; 51°38′39″N 0°08′08″E	1165797	Parish Church of St Mary and All Saints More images
Church of St Mary	Little Laver, Epping Forest	Parish Church	14th century	20 February 1967	TL5448609649; 51°45′51″N 0°14′14″E	1337240	Church of St Mary More images
Little Laver Grange	Little Laver, Epping Forest	House	16th century	27 August 1957	TL5453309660; 51°45′51″N 0°14′17″E	1111307	Little Laver Grange More images
The Warren	Epping New Rd, Loughton, Epping Forest	House	Early 19th century	29 May 1984	TQ4098195665; 51°38′32″N 0°02′10″E	1165605	Upload Photo
Bushes Farmhouse	Magdalen Laver, Epping Forest	Farmhouse	c. 1500	22 February 1952	TL5257407923; 51°44′57″N 0°12′32″E	1123942	Bushes Farmhouse More images
Parish Church of St Mary Magdalen	Magdalen Laver, Epping Forest	Church	Roman	20 February 1967	TL5130408283; 51°45′10″N 0°11′26″E	1123945	Parish Church of St Mary Magdalen More images
Weald Lodge	Magdalen Laver, Epping Forest	Farmhouse	Early 19th century	22 July 1981	TL5154807284; 51°44′38″N 0°11′37″E	1309169	Upload Photo
Wynters Armourie	Magdalen Laver, Epping Forest	House	16th century	22 February 1952	TL4988008174; 51°45′08″N 0°10′12″E	1165903	Wynters Armourie More images
Matching Hall	Matching, Epping Forest	Cross Wing House	15th century	22 February 1952	TL5253811906; 51°47′06″N 0°12′36″E	1337571	Matching Hall More images
Moat House	Matching Green, Matching, Epping Forest	House	Late 16th century	26 April 1984	TL5365911276; 51°46′45″N 0°13′34″E	1123926	Upload Photo
Parish Church of St Mary	Matching, Epping Forest	Parish Church	Early 13th century	20 February 1967	TL5251911960; 51°47′08″N 0°12′35″E	1166182	Parish Church of St Mary More images
The Marriage Feast Room	Matching, Epping Forest	Marriage Feast House	C15/C16	22 February 1952	TL5249111951; 51°47′08″N 0°12′34″E	1166130	The Marriage Feast Room More images
Church of St Mary the Virgin	Moreton, Epping Forest	Parish Church	13th century	20 February 1967	TL5374207038; 51°44′27″N 0°13′31″E	1168371	Church of St Mary the Virgin More images
Barn 20 Metres South of Greenleaves	Nazeing, Epping Forest	Barn	Early 15th century	4 July 1984	TL4000206340; 51°44′18″N 0°01′34″E	1111139	Upload Photo
Dormers	Nazeing, Epping Forest	House	Late 16th century	22 February 1952	TL4025605565; 51°43′53″N 0°01′46″E	1111143	Upload Photo
Greenleaves	Nazeing, Epping Forest	House	16th century	22 February 1952	TL3999106358; 51°44′18″N 0°01′34″E	1337294	Upload Photo
Old House	Nazeing, Epping Forest	Timber Framed House	Late 16th century	4 July 1984	TL4179606211; 51°44′12″N 0°03′08″E	1111136	Old House More images
Latton Priory	North Weald Bassett, Epping Forest	Augustinian Monastery	Abandoned by 1534	26 April 1984	TL4657906558; 51°44′19″N 0°07′17″E	1111392	Latton Priory More images
Paris Hall	North Weald Bassett, Epping Forest	House	19th century	22 February 1952	TL4878207193; 51°44′37″N 0°09′13″E	1146700	Upload Photo
Parish Church of St Andrew	North Weald Bassett, Epping Forest	Parish Church	c. 1330	20 February 1967	TL4954905187; 51°43′32″N 0°09′50″E	1111353	Parish Church of St Andrew More images
Sewalds Hall Farmhouse	North Weald Bassett, Epping Forest	Farmhouse	15th century	26 April 1984	TL4957507408; 51°44′43″N 0°09′55″E	1146628	Upload Photo
Greensted Hall	Greensted, Ongar, Epping Forest	Hall House	Medieval	11 April 1984	TL5389503053; 51°42′18″N 0°13′33″E	1337500	Upload Photo
Marden Ash House	Marden Ash, Ongar, Epping Forest	House	Late 17th century	11 April 1984	TL5511002011; 51°41′44″N 0°14′34″E	1124047	Upload Photo
Newhouse Farmhouse	Marden Ash, Ongar, Epping Forest	Farmhouse	c. 1600	11 April 1984	TL5558502180; 51°41′49″N 0°14′59″E	1337514	Upload Photo
Shelley Hall	Shelley, Ongar, Epping Forest	Hall House	Early 14th century	11 April 1984	TL5532805034; 51°43′21″N 0°14′51″E	1337516	Shelley Hall More images
Barn 100 Metres East of Netherhall Farmhouse	Roydon, Epping Forest	Aisled Barn	Mid 14th century	11 January 1979	TL3980908254; 51°45′20″N 0°01′27″E	1182232	Upload Photo
Garden Wall at Netherhall	Roydon, Epping Forest	Garden Wall	early-mid 15th century	4 July 1984	TL3981608306; 51°45′22″N 0°01′27″E	1111123	Upload Photo
Netherhall Farmhouse	Roydon, Epping Forest	House	15th century	22 February 1952	TL3974808238; 51°45′19″N 0°01′24″E	1111122	Upload Photo
Aylmers	Sheering, Epping Forest	Farmhouse	20th century	22 February 1952	TL4892112927; 51°47′43″N 0°09′29″E	1147128	Aylmers More images
Daubneys Farmhouse	Sheering, Epping Forest	Farmhouse	Mid 16th century	26 April 1984	TL5083614061; 51°48′17″N 0°11′11″E	1111369	Upload Photo
Durrington Hall	Sheering, Epping Forest	Country House	Mid-18th century	20 February 1967	TL4898013061; 51°47′47″N 0°09′32″E	1111363	Upload Photo
Sheering Hall	Sheering, Epping Forest	House	19th and 20th centuries	22 February 1952	TL4962012882; 51°47′40″N 0°10′05″E	1337229	Sheering Hall More images
Church of St Margaret of Antioch	Stanford Rivers, Epping Forest	Parish Church	12th century	20 February 1967	TL5341600881; 51°41′09″N 0°13′04″E	1337534	Church of St Margaret of Antioch More images
Littlebury	Stanford Rivers, Epping Forest	Timber Framed House	Late Medieval	27 August 1952	TL5511601179; 51°41′17″N 0°14′33″E	1306771	Littlebury More images
Bons Farmhouse	Stapleford Abbotts, Epping Forest	Farmhouse	15th century	27 August 1952	TQ5030496787; 51°38′59″N 0°10′16″E	1337304	Bons Farmhouse
Church of St Mary	Stapleford Tawney, Epping Forest	Parish Church	c. 1220	20 February 1967	TQ5028899018; 51°40′11″N 0°10′19″E	1124008	Church of St Mary More images
The Old Rectory	Stapleford Tawney, Epping Forest	House	13th century	27 August 1952	TQ5038099472; 51°40′26″N 0°10′24″E	1169231	Upload Photo
Gaynes Park	Theydon Garnon, Epping Forest	House	Medieval	11 April 1984	TL4844801780; 51°41′43″N 0°08′47″E	1123952	Gaynes Park More images
Abbey Gateway	Waltham Abbey, Epping Forest	Gateway	Mid 14th century	26 January 1956	TL3808300737; 51°41′18″N 0°00′14″W	1124156	Abbey Gateway More images
Church of St Thomas	Waltham Abbey, Epping Forest	Church	1901-1902	22 March 1974	TL4157101001; 51°41′24″N 0°02′48″E	1169564	Church of St Thomas More images
Essex House	Waltham Abbey, Epping Forest	House	1722	26 January 1956	TL3849300360; 51°41′06″N 0°00′07″E	1306335	Upload Photo
Hollyfield Hall Farmhouse	Holyfield, Waltham Abbey, Epping Forest	Farmhouse	c. 1560	22 March 1974	TL3837003977; 51°43′03″N 0°00′06″E	1124131	Hollyfield Hall Farmhouse
Luthers	Waltham Abbey, Epping Forest	House	Early 19th century	22 March 1974	TQ3805897242; 51°39′25″N 0°00′20″W	1124102	Luthers
Midnight Chapel	Waltham Abbey, Epping Forest	Chapel	Late 12th century	26 January 1956	TL3817700704; 51°41′17″N 0°00′09″W	1337453	Midnight Chapel More images
Ministry of Defence Building L148 (group G Incorporating Mills)	Royal Gunpowder Factory, Waltham Abbey, Epping Forest	Gunpowder Works	c1898-99	26 November 1993	TL3768901284; 51°41′36″N 0°00′33″W	1262902	Upload Photo
Ministry of Defence Building L149 (group E Incorporating Mills)	Royal Gunpowder Factory, Waltham Abbey, Epping Forest	Wall	c. 1869	26 November 1993	TL3774301289; 51°41′36″N 0°00′31″W	1251161	Upload Photo
Ministry of Defence Building L153 (group D Incorporating Mills)	Royal Gunpowder Factory, Waltham Abbey, Epping Forest	Gunpowder Works	1867-8	26 November 1993	TL3771001232; 51°41′35″N 0°00′32″W	1251162	Upload Photo
Ministry of Defence Building Numbers L176 (boiler House) and L177	Royal Gunpowder Factory, Waltham Abbey, Epping Forest	Gunpowder Works	1857	26 November 1993	TL3773401026; 51°41′28″N 0°00′31″W	1329390	Upload Photo
Ministry of Defence Buildings A201 and A202 at Tl 3768800948	Royal Gunpowder Factory, Waltham Abbey, Epping Forest	Gunpowder Works	1787-1800	26 November 1993	TL3768800948; 51°41′25″N 0°00′34″W	1251016	Upload Photo
Ministry of Defence Number L168 (engine House and Mechanics' Shop)	Royal Gunpowder Factory, Waltham Abbey, Epping Forest	Gunpowder Works	1857	26 November 1993	TL3771801050; 51°41′29″N 0°00′32″W	1251159	Upload Photo
Waltham Abbey Vicarage	Waltham Abbey, Epping Forest	Vicarage	Late 16th century or early 17th century	3 February 1971	TL3808700666; 51°41′16″N 0°00′14″W	1124127	Waltham Abbey Vicarage More images
Gateway and East and West Lodges to London Entrance Drive to Copped Hall	Waltham Abbey, Epping Forest	Gate & Lodges	c. 1775	3 February 1971	TL4305600480; 51°41′06″N 0°04′05″E	1124120	Gateway and East and West Lodges to London Entrance Drive to Copped Hall More images
1 Sun Street	Waltham Abbey, Epping Forest	Timber Framed House	16th century	26 January 1956	TL3818100554; 51°41′12″N 0°00′09″W	1169858	Upload Photo
41 Sun Street	Waltham Abbey, Epping Forest	House	18th century	25 October 1973	TL3837600545; 51°41′12″N 0°00′01″E	1169920	Upload Photo
31 Highbridge Street	Waltham Abbey, Epping Forest	House	Early to mid 18th century	26 January 1956	TL3793600598; 51°41′14″N 0°00′22″W	1337477	31 Highbridge Street More images
St Andrew's Church, Willingale	Willingale, Epping Forest	Parish Church	12th century	20 February 1967	TL5962507313; 51°44′30″N 0°18′38″E	1169175	St Andrew's Church, Willingale More images
Dukes Farmhouse	Willingale, Epping Forest	Farmhouse	c. 1400	27 August 1957	TL5944207948; 51°44′51″N 0°18′30″E	1337269	Dukes Farmhouse More images
Parish Church of St Christopher	Willingale, Epping Forest	Parish Church	Late 14th century	20 February 1967	TL5962607370; 51°44′32″N 0°18′38″E	1111257	Parish Church of St Christopher More images
Tilehouse Farm	Birds Green, Willingale, Epping Forest	Farmhouse	15th century	29 June 1984	TL5867608822; 51°45′20″N 0°17′51″E	1111243	Upload Photo
Torrells Hall	Willingale, Epping Forest	House	Late 16th century	27 August 1957	TL6007808275; 51°45′01″N 0°19′03″E	1111249	Torrells Hall More images
