= Hundred of Ongar =

Ancient hundred in west Essex, England

Coordinates: 51.72°N 0.21°E

Hundred of Ongar was an ancient hundred in the west of the county of Essex, England. Hundred of Ongar was centred on the town of Chipping Ongar.

Hundred of Ongar contained the following parishes:

- Abbess Roding
- Beauchamp Roding
- Berners Roding
- Bobbingworth or Bovinger
- Chigwell
- Chipping Ongar
- Fyfield
- Greensted-juxta-Ongar
- High Laver
- High Ongar
- Kelvedon Hatch
- Lambourne
- Little Laver
- Loughton
- Magdalen Laver
- Moreton
- Navestock
- North Weald Bassett
- Norton Mandeville
- Shelley
- Stanford Rivers
- Stapleford Abbotts
- Stapleford Tawney
- Stondon Massey
- Theydon Bois
- Theydon Garnon
- Theydon Mount

== See also ==
- Hundreds of Essex
