= Gamaliel Capell =

English Member of Parliament (1561–1613)

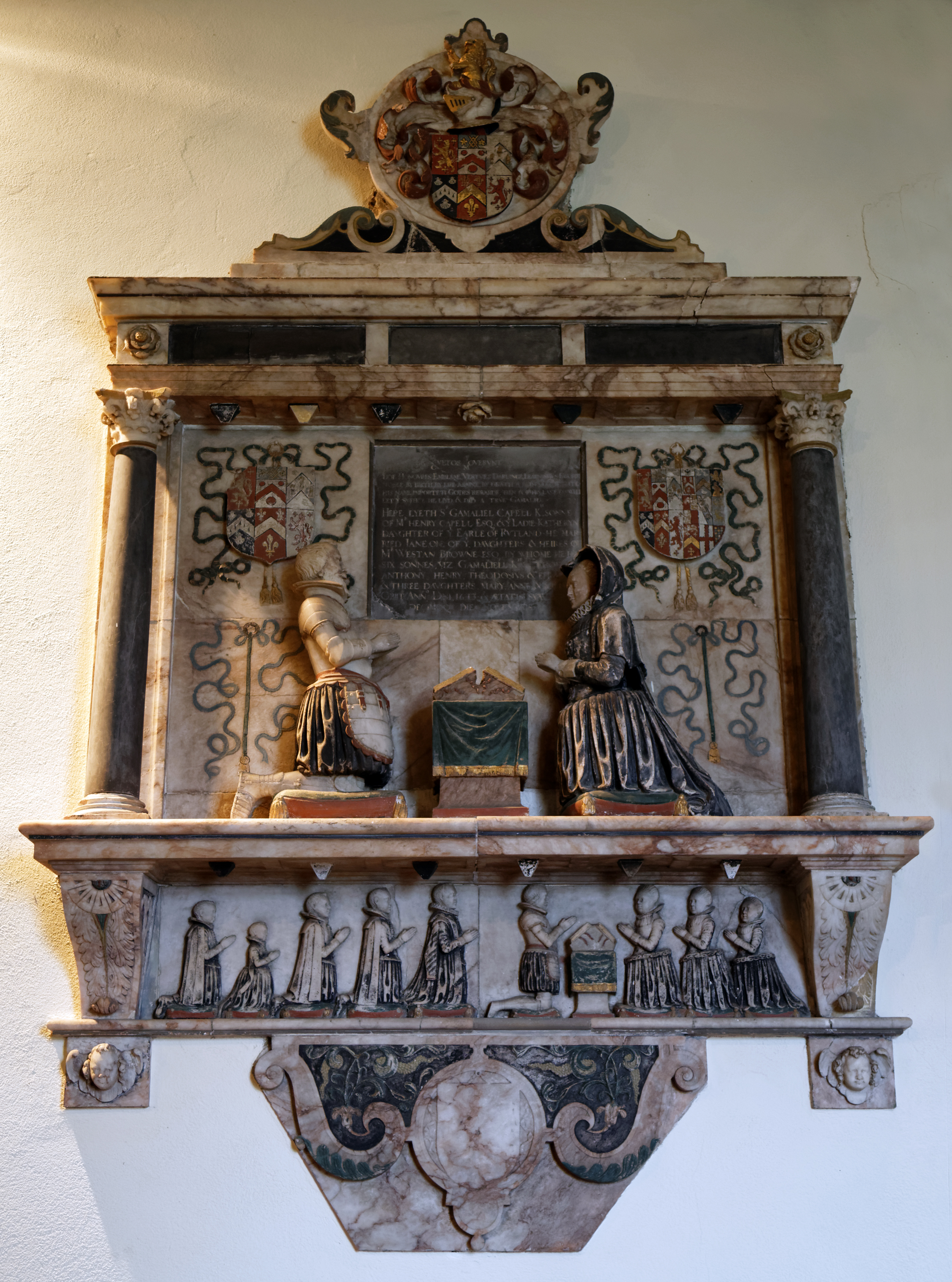
Mural monument to Sir Gamaliel Capell (d.1613), St Edmund's Church, Abbess Roding, Essex

Arms of Capell: Gules, a lion rampant between three cross-crosslets fitchée or

Sir Gamaliel Capell (1561–1613), of Rookwood Hall in the parish of Abbess Roding in Essex served as a Member of Parliament for the county seat of Essex from 1605 to 1613.

== Origins ==
He was born on 2 January 1561, the 4th son of Henry Capell (c.1537-1588), of Hadham Hall in the parish of Little Hadham, Hertfordshire, and of Rayne in Essex, Sheriff of Essex, Sheriff of Hertfordshire and a Member of Parliament for Hertfordshire. His mother was Katherine Manners, a daughter of Thomas Manners, 1st Earl of Rutland. He was a descendant of Sir William Capel (c.1446-1515) of Capel Court in the parish of St Bartholomew-by-the-Exchange in the City of London and of Hadham Hall, Lord Mayor of London.

== Marriage and issue ==
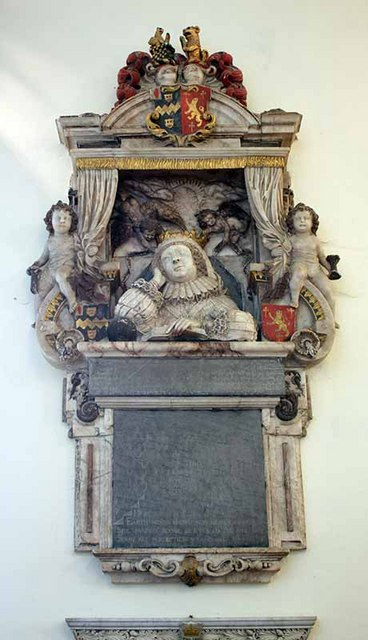
Mural monument to Mildred Capell (d.1633), a daughter of Gamaliel Capell and wife of Sir William Luckyn, 1st Baronet; Abbess Roding Church

On 6 September 1584 he married Jane Browne (d.1618), a daughter and co-heiress of Wiston Browne of Rookwood Hall in the parish of Abbess Roding in Essex and widow of Edward Wyatt of Tillingham in Essex, by whom he had issue six sons and three daughters, including:

- Gamaliel Capell, eldest son and heir.
- Mildred Capell (d.1633), whose mural monument with her bust survives in Abbess Roding Church, wife of Sir William Luckyn, 1st Baronet (1594–1660), of Little Waltham, and mother of Sir Capell Luckyn, 2nd Baronet (1622–1680), whose male descendants (having adopted the surname Grimston) included William Grimston, 1st Viscount Grimston (c.1683–1756) and James Walter Grimston, 1st Earl of Verulam, 4th Viscount Grimston (1775–1845).

== Sources ==
- Andrew Thrush, biography of Capell, Sir Gamaliel (1561-1613), of Rookwood Hall, Abbess Roding, Essex, published in History of Parliament: House of Commons 1604-1629, ed. Andrew Thrush and John P. Ferris, 2010
