= Laetitia Selwyn Oliver =

- Born: December 30, 1852; Bobbingworth
- Died: February 26, 1926
- Father: William Macjanley Oliver
- Relatives: Samuel Pasfield Oliver, Amy Oliver

Laetitia Selwyn Oliver (30 December 1852 – 26 February 1926) was a British writer of Catholic religious works.

Laetitia Selwyn Oliver was born on 30 December 1852 in Bobbingworth, Essex, the daughter of William Macjanley Oliver, Anglican rector of Bobbingworth, and Jane Weldon Oliver. At some point she embraced Catholicism and wrote religious works and fiction with strong religious themes. Her debut novels Father Placid and Rose Fortescue were published together in 1884 by Washbourne as part of its line of affordable one shilling books. Father Placid was a Benedictine murdered in 1600 by Richard Vyvyan and thought to haunt Vyvyan's Protestant heirs. In Annunziata: or, The Gipsy Child (1887) features characters who convert to Catholicism by the book's end, while The Expiation of the Lady Anne involves a family curse. She also wrote a biography of the Catholic martyr Margaret Citherow.

Laetitia Selwyn Oliver died on 26 February 1926.

== Bibliography ==
- Father Placid; Or, the Custodian of the Blessed Sacrament. London: R. Washbourne, 1884.
- Rose Fortescue; or, the Decout Client of Our Lady of Dolours. London, 1884
- (translator) Month of the Sacred Heart by Abbe Berlioux. London, 1885.
- Life of Margaret Citherow. London, 1886.
- Annunziata: or, The Gipsy Child. 1 vol. Dublin: M. H. Gill and Sons, 1887.
- The Expiation of the Lady Anne. London: H. J, Drane, 1905.
- The Scarlet Crescent. London: H. J, Drane, 1906.
