= Henry Capell (MP for Hertfordshire) =

16th-century English politician

Arms of Capell: Gules, a lion rampant between three cross-crosslets fitchée or

Henry Capell (born before 1537 – 1588), of Hadham Hall in the parish of Little Hadham in Hertfordshire and of Rayne in Essex, was an English politician.

== Origins ==
He was the eldest son of Sir Edward Capell (d.1577) of Aspenden Hall, Hertfordshire, by his wife Anne Pelham, a daughter of Sir William Pelham of Loughton in Essex. He was a great-grandson of Sir William Capel (c.1446-1515) of Capel Court in the parish of St Bartholomew-by-the-Exchange in the City of London and of Hadham Hall, Lord Mayor of London.

== Career ==
Capell fought in the English army at the siege of Leith in 1560. He was a justice of the peace for Essex from 1575 and for Hertfordshire from 1577. He was appointed Sheriff of Essex for 1579–80 and Sheriff of Hertfordshire for 1585–86. He was a member of parliament for Hertfordshire in 1563. He died in 1588.

== Marriages & issue ==
He married twice:

- Firstly to Katherine Manners, a daughter of Thomas Manners, 1st Earl of Rutland, by whom he had 7 sons and 4 daughters, including:
  - Arthur Capell, he was the grandfather of Arthur Capell and the ancestor of the Earls of Essex, he married Margaret Grey, daughter of John Grey
  - Sir Gamaliel Capell (1561–1613), 4th son, of Rookwood Hall in the parish of Abbess Roding in Essex, a member of parliament for the county seat of Essex.
- Secondly he married Mary Browne, a daughter of Sir Anthony Browne (d.1548), MP, of Battle Abbey and Cowdray Park in Sussex, and widow of Lord John Grey of Pirgo in Essex.
