= Luckyn =

Luckyn is a surname. Notable people with the surname include:

- Capel Luckyn (1622–1680), English politician
- Luckyn Baronets
