= Gerald Barry =

Gerald Barry may refer to:

- Gerald Barry (British journalist) (1898–1968), British newspaper editor and organizer of the Festival of Britain
- Gerald Barry (Irish journalist) (1947–2011), Irish political journalist and broadcaster
- Gerald Barry (British Army officer) (1896–1977), British soldier and cricketer
- Gerald Barry (composer) (born 1952), Irish composer
- Gerald Barry (actor), British stage and film actor
- Gerat Barry or Gerald Barry (fl. 1624–1642), colonel in the Spanish army and military writer

== See also ==
- Gerald de Barry (c. 1146–c. 1223), clergyman and chronicler
