= Birds Green =

Hamlet in Essex, England

Coordinates: 51.7567°N 0.2979°E

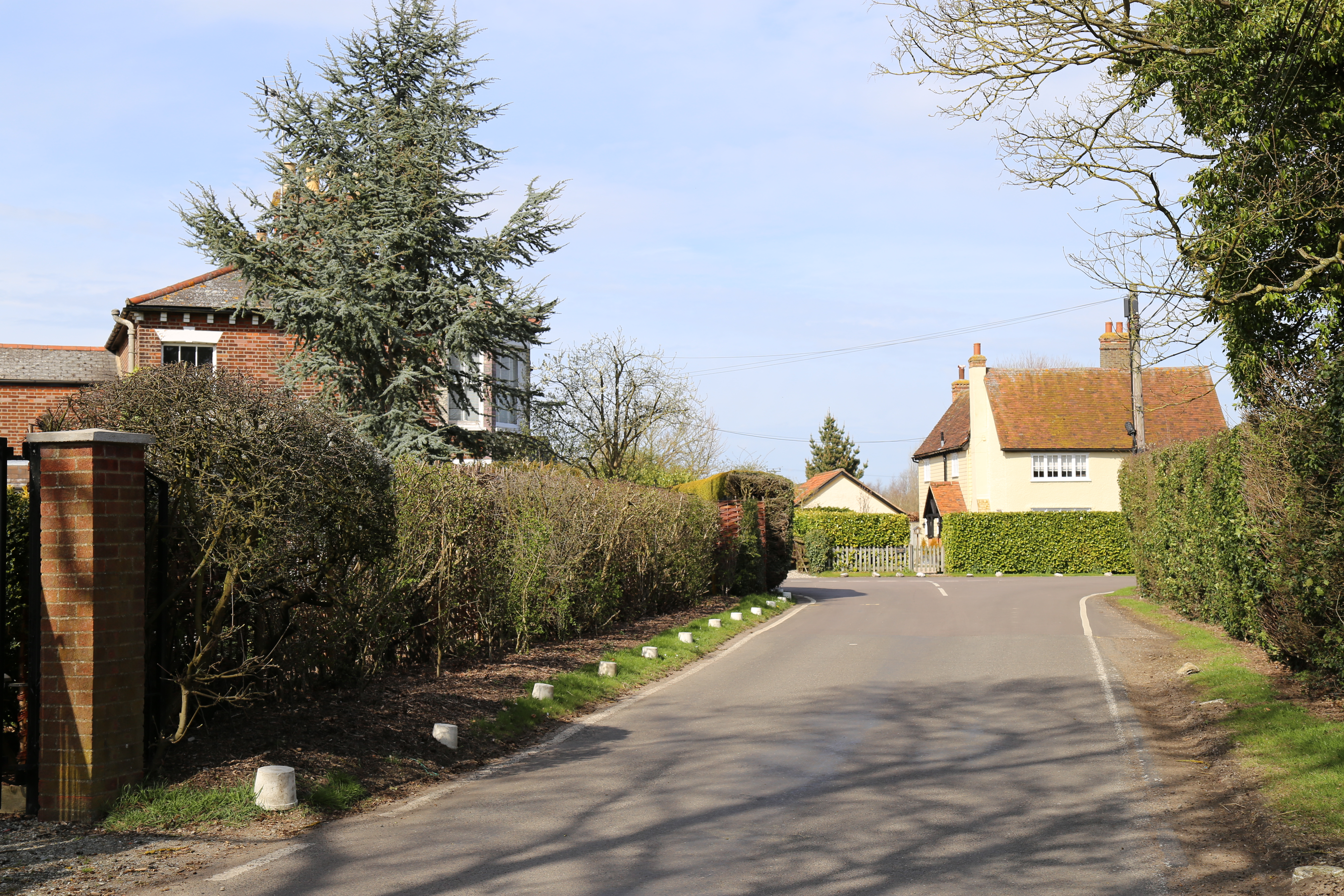
- Birds Green

- Location within Essex
- Civil parish: Abbess Beauchamp and Berners Roding
- District: Epping Forest
- Shire county: Essex
- Region: East
- Country: England
- Sovereign state: United Kingdom
- Dialling code: 01277
- Police: Essex
- Fire: Essex
- Ambulance: East of England
- UK Parliament: Brentwood and Ongar

Birds Green is a hamlet in the civil parish of Abbess, Beauchamp and Berners Roding and the Epping Forest district of Essex, England. The hamlet is within The Rodings group of civil parishes, and is 9 miles (14 km) west from the county town of Chelmsford. The village of Beauchamp Roding is less than 1 mile (1.6 km) to the north, and Fyfield 1.5 miles (2.4 km) to the south.

The River Roding flows through Birds Green, and feeds three lakes for angling at the northeast of the hamlet.
