= Shellow Bowells =

Village in Essex, England

Coordinates: 51.746°N 0.332°E

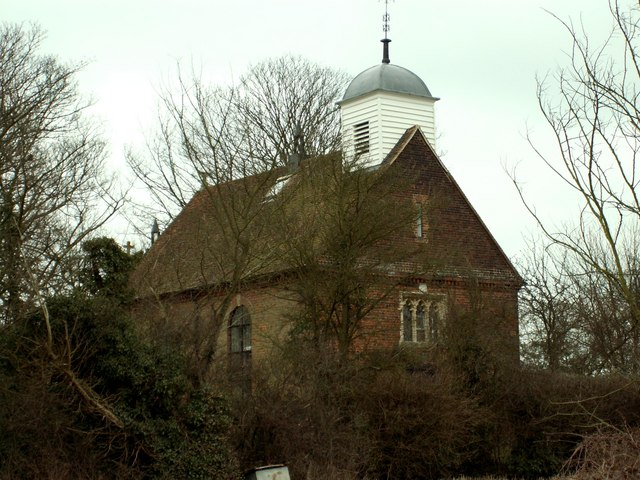
- The converted parish church

- Location within Essex
- Civil parish: Willingale
- District: Epping Forest
- Shire county: Essex
- Region: East
- Country: England
- Sovereign state: United Kingdom
- Post town: ONGAR
- Postcode district: CM5

Shellow Bowells is a small hamlet in the civil parish of Willingale, in the Epping Forest District of Essex, England. It is situated 6 miles (10 km) to the west of Chelmsford, between the villages of Willingale to the west and Roxwell to the east.

The name is derived from the Old English Shellow, meaning a bend in the river, referring to the River Roding. The Bowells part of the name comes from the Bueles family who owned the manor in the 13th century.

In Saxon times, Shellow Bowells and neighbouring Willingale appear to have formed part of the extensive Roding estate, which subsequently fragmented into multiple manors and parishes. Shellow had become a separate vill by the time of the Domesday Book of 1086 when it was listed as "Scelda" in the Dunmow hundred.

No priest or church was mentioned in the Domesday Book, but Shellow Bowells came to be a parish. The parish church, dedicated to St Peter and St Paul, was rebuilt in 1754. The parish was small, and in 1798 it became part of a united benefice with the neighbouring parish of Willingale Doe. In 1924 it was decided that Willingale Doe, Shellow Bowells, and Willingale Spain would be combined into a single ecclesiastical parish next time a vacancy arose in one of the two benefices. The merged ecclesiastical parish came into effect in 1928. The former parish church of St Peter and St Paul at Shellow Bowells has been converted into a house.

Although Shellow Bowells had ceased to be a separate ecclesiastical parish in 1928, it continued to exist as a civil parish until 1946, when the civil parish was likewise abolished and merged with Willingale Doe and Willingale Spain to become the civil parish of Willingale. At the 1931 census (the last before the abolition of the civil parish), Shellow Bowells had a population of 95.

Shellow Bowells is mentioned by Bill Bryson in a list of unusual British place-names in Notes From A Small Island. It is also mentioned in Paul Theroux's The Kingdom By The Sea. It is referred to as Shallow Bowells in Part Five of Random Harvest by James Hilton.
