= Berners Roding =

Village in Essex, England

Coordinates: 51.7650°N 0.3217°E

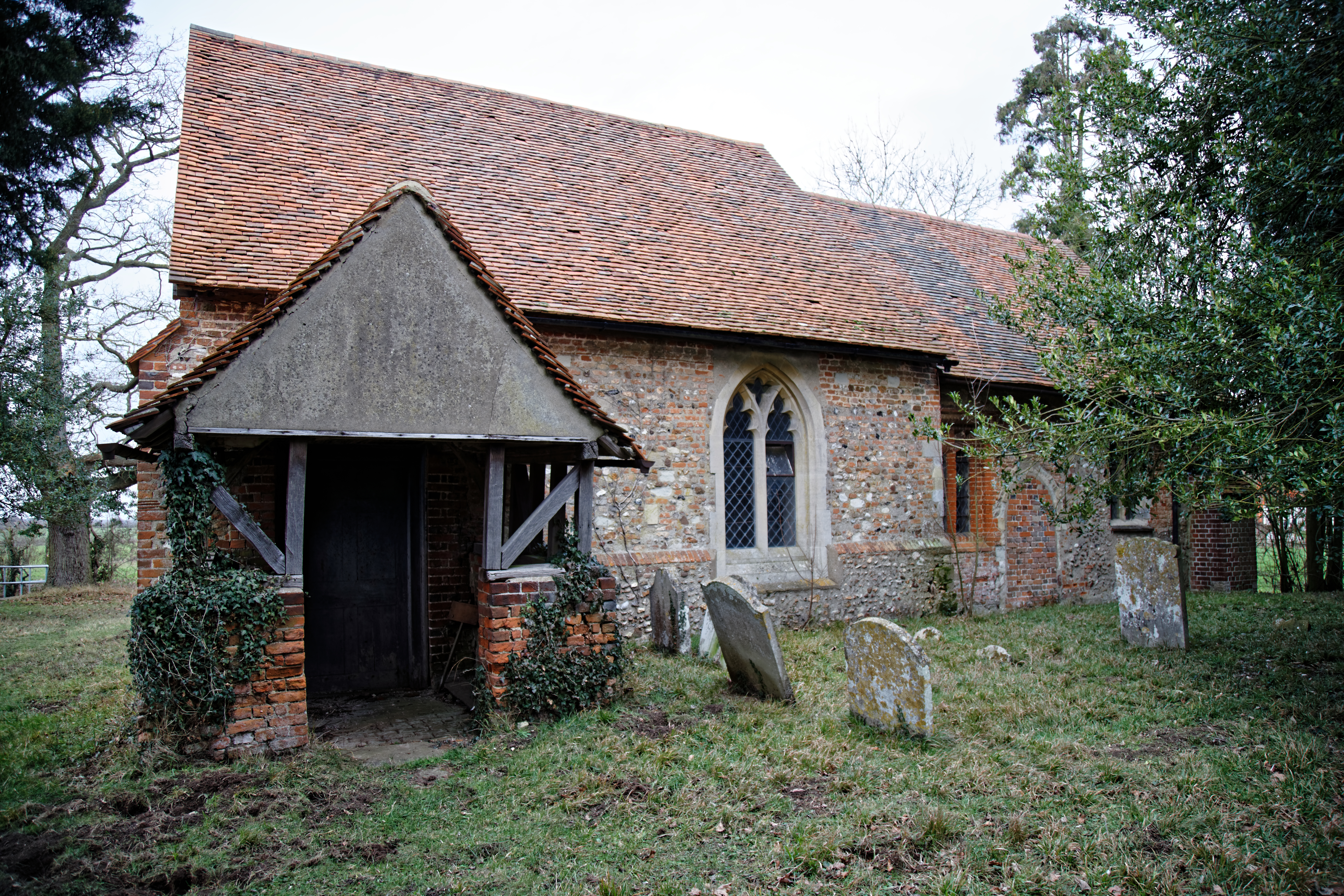
- All Saints Church, Berners Roding

- Location within Essex
- OS grid reference: TL603099
- Civil parish: Abbess, Beauchamp and Berners Roding
- District: Epping Forest
- Shire county: Essex
- Region: East
- Country: England
- Sovereign state: United Kingdom
- Post town: Ongar
- Postcode district: CM5
- Police: Essex
- Fire: Essex
- Ambulance: East of England

Berners Roding (pronounced Barnish) is a village in the civil parish of Abbess Beauchamp and Berners Roding in the Epping Forest District of Essex, England. The village is included in the eight hamlets and villages called The Rodings. Berners Roding is 6 miles (10 km) west from the county town of Chelmsford. It was formerly a separate parish but merged with its neighbours Abbess Roding and Beauchamp Roding in 1946 to form the modern parish.

== History ==
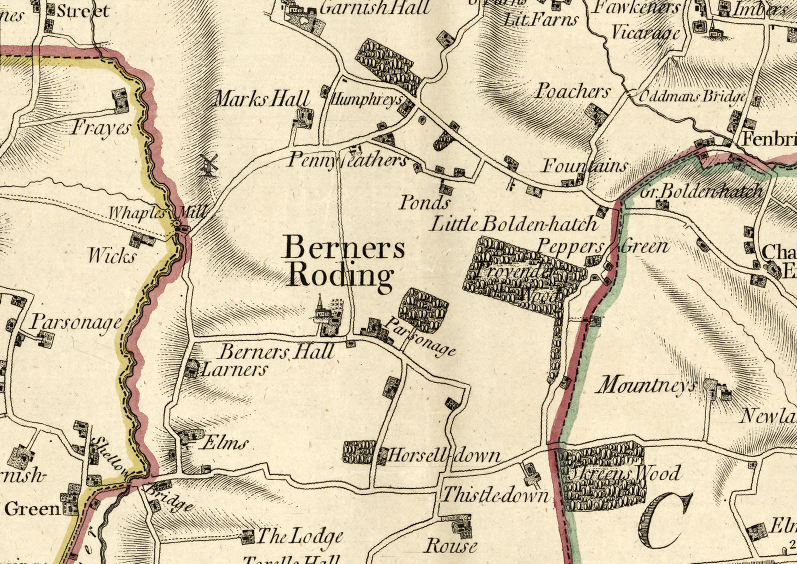
Berners Roding in the Chapman and Andre map of 1777

According to A Dictionary of British Place Names, Roding derives from "Rodinges" as is listed in the Domesday Book and recorded earlier as such at c.1050. 'Berners' Roding is not listed in Domesday.

An alternative traditional name for the village, manor, and previous parish, was 'Berners Roothing'. It was in the Hundred of Dunmow. The parish church was appropriated to the monastery of St Leonard, at Bow in Middlesex. The daughter of Sir James Berners, Juliana Berners of the Order of Saint Benedict, writer on heraldry, hawking and hunting, and prioress of the Priory of St Mary of Sopwell, was born in the parish.

In the 19th century Berners Roding was in the Dunmow Union—poor relief provision set up under the Poor Law Amendment Act 1834 —and part of the Rural Deanery of Roding. The registers of the church of All Saints' (deconsecrated in 1985 and privately owned) date to 1538. The 1848 living was a perpetual curracy, held by the rector of Margaret Roothing, and in the gift or donative of the lord of the manor. In 1882 the living was in the gift of a Colonel Bramston, and held by the rector of Willingale Doe, part of today's Willingale, where the children of Berners Roding attended school. In 1848 Berners Roothing parish land of 1,030 acres (4.2 km^{2}) supported a population of 103; in 1882, 1,050 acres (4.2 km^{2}) supported 86. Crops grown at the time were chiefly wheat, barley and beans, on a heavy soil with a clay subsoil. Parish occupations included three farmers in 1848, and two in 1882.

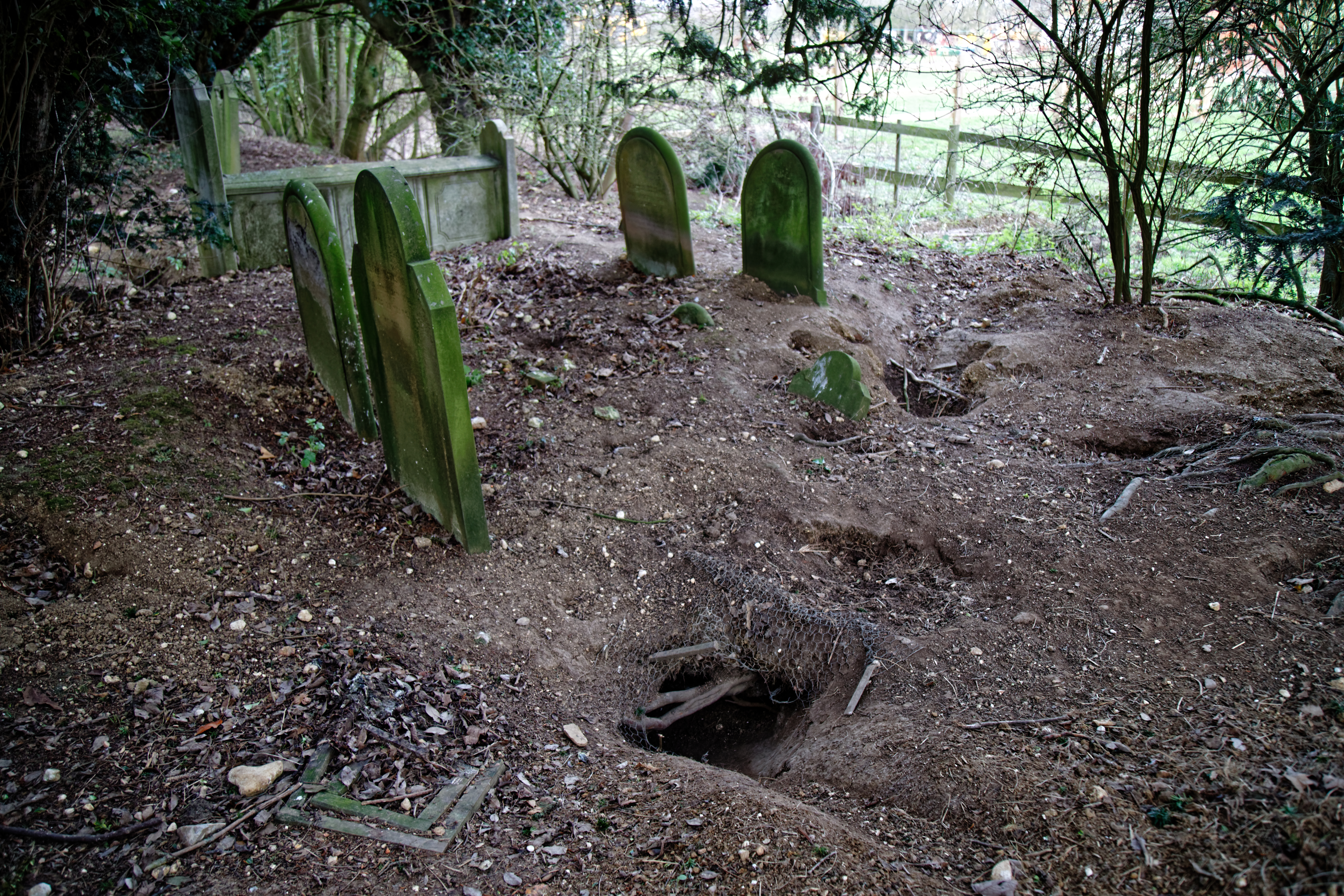
All Saints Church graveyard

In 1946 the three parishes of Abbess Roding, Beauchamp Roding, and Berners Roding were merged into a new civil parish called Abbess Beauchamp and Berners Roding. At the 1931 census (the last before the abolition of the civil parish), Berners Roding had a population of 81.

Berners Roding's unlisted All Saints Church dates to at least the 14th century, with some remnants dating to the 12th. It was deconsecrated in 1985. It, and its graveyard, is in a state of neglect and decay.
