= Nigel Capel-Cure =

English cricketer

Nigel Capel Cure
Personal information
- Full name: George Nigel Capel Cure
- Born: 28 September 1908; Kensington, London, England
- Died: 8 August 2004 (aged 95); Harlow, Essex, England
- Batting: Left-handed
- Bowling: Leg-break

Domestic team information
- Years: Team
- 1929: Essex

Career statistics
Competition	First-class
Matches	1
Runs scored	6
Batting average	3.00
100s/50s	–/–
Top score	6
Balls bowled	66
Wickets	2
Bowling average	29.00
5 wickets in innings	–
10 wickets in match	–
Best bowling	2/58
Catches/stumpings	–/–
- Source: CricketArchive, 1 March 2012

George Nigel Capel-Cure JP DL TD (28 September 1908 – 8 August 2004) was an English cricketer. He was a left-handed batsman and leg-break bowler who played a single game in his entire career for Essex during the 1929 season.

Capel Cure was born in Kensington. He was educated at Eton College and Trinity College, Cambridge

Capel Cure played just one game for Essex, in the 1929 season, of a drawn match against his alma mater Cambridge University. Batting at number four, Capel Cure was trapped leg-before wicket by Trevil Morgan in his first innings for a duck, and scored just six runs in the second innings before being caught and bowled by Gordon Chandler.

Bowling, he took 2–58 in the Essex first innings; his wickets were of Tom Killick (lbw, but only after he'd scored a double century) and George Kemp-Welch (also lbw) in the Cambridge 1st innings. Cambridge did not complete their 2nd innings.

Capel Cure's brother-in-law was Gerald Barry, who played one first-class match for the Combined Services in 1922.

Capel Cure was a landowner in Shropshire and Essex. He received the Territorial Decoration. He was High Sheriff of Essex in 1951–52 and deputy lord-lieutenant of the county from 1958 to 1978. He lived at Blake Hall, near Ongar. He died in Harlow.
