= Beauchamp Roding =

Village in Essex, England

Coordinates: 51.767°N 0.288°E

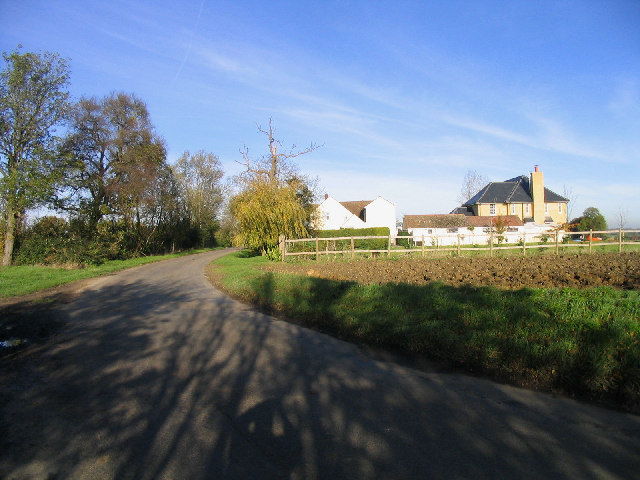
- Beauchamp Roding

- Location within Essex
- OS grid reference: TL5810
- Civil parish: Abbess, Beauchamp and Berners Roding
- Shire county: Essex
- Region: East
- Country: England
- Sovereign state: United Kingdom
- Post town: Ongar
- Postcode district: CM5
- Police: Essex
- Fire: Essex
- Ambulance: East of England

Beauchamp Roding (/ˈbiːtʃəm/ BEETCH-əm) is a village in the civil parish of Abbess Beauchamp and Berners Roding in the Epping Forest District of Essex, England. The village is included in the eight hamlets and villages called The Rodings. Beauchamp Roding is 8 miles (13 km) west from the county town of Chelmsford. It was formerly a separate parish but merged with its neighbours Abbess Roding and Berners Roding in 1946 to form the modern parish.

== History ==
According to A Dictionary of British Place Names, Roding derives from "Rodinges" as is listed in the Domesday Book, with the later variation 'Royenges Beauchamp' recorded in 1238. The 'Beauchamp' refers to the manorial possession by a family called 'de Beauchamp' held under the ownership of the Abbess of Barking.

In the Domesday account Beauchamp Roding is listed as in the Hundred of Ongar. It held 15 households, two villagers, 13 smallholders, 50 acres (0.2 km^{2}) of meadow and 200 pigs. Before the Conquest, lordship was held by Edsi and Leofwin; after given to Aubrey de Vere, with Count Alan of Brittany as Tenant-in-chief to William the Conqueror.

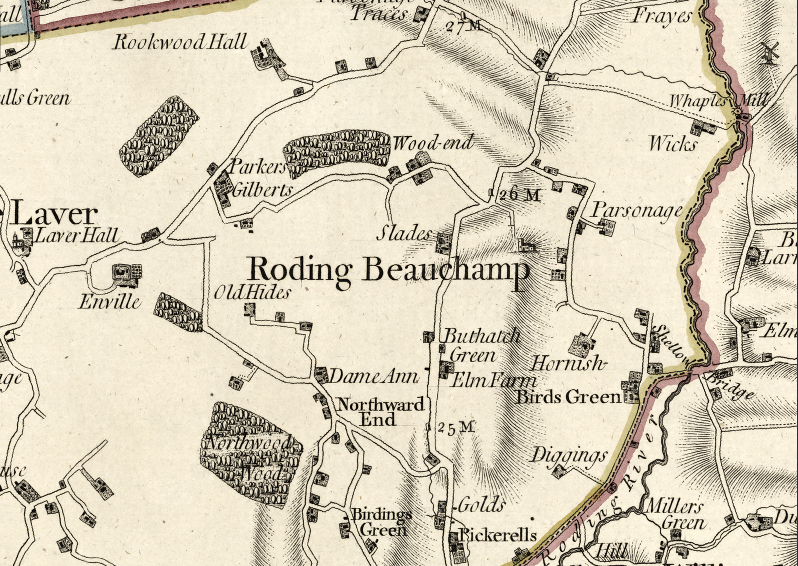
Chapman and Andre map 1777 showing Roding Beauchamp (Beauchamp Roding)

Other traditional names for the village and manor included 'Beauchamp Roothing' and 'Roding Beauchamp'.

It was in the Hundred of Ongar, and part of the Rural Deanery of Ongar. St Botolph's parish church is a Grade II* listed building. Parts of the church structure date from the 14th century. The registers of the church of St Botolph date to 1688. The church, which was restored in 1867, had attached an 1882 living of a rectory with residence for the priest. The Old Rectory is a Grade II listed building.

In 1882, Beauchamp Roding was in the Ongar Union—poor relief provision set up under the Poor Law Amendment Act 1834. The workhouse building later became a parish school which gave the road through the village - School Lane - its name, although no school now remains.

The hamlet of Birds Green in the parish to the south of the village was partly in the parish of Willingale Doe. Crops grown at the time were chiefly wheat, barley and beans, on a heavy soil with a clay subsoil. There was a land area of 1,311 acres (5.3 km^{2}) supporting an 1881 population of 231. Occupations included a beer retailer, a farm bailiff, five farmers, one of whom was a hay dealer and the licensee of the Swan Inn public house, and another farming at Butt Hatch. Also at Butt Hatch was a shopkeeper.

On 1 April 1946 the parish was abolished to form "Abbess Beauchamp and Berners Roding". At the 1931 census (the last before the abolition of the civil parish), Beauchamp Roding had a population of 173.
