= St Andrew's Church, Willingale =

Coordinates: 51.7418°N 0.3106°E

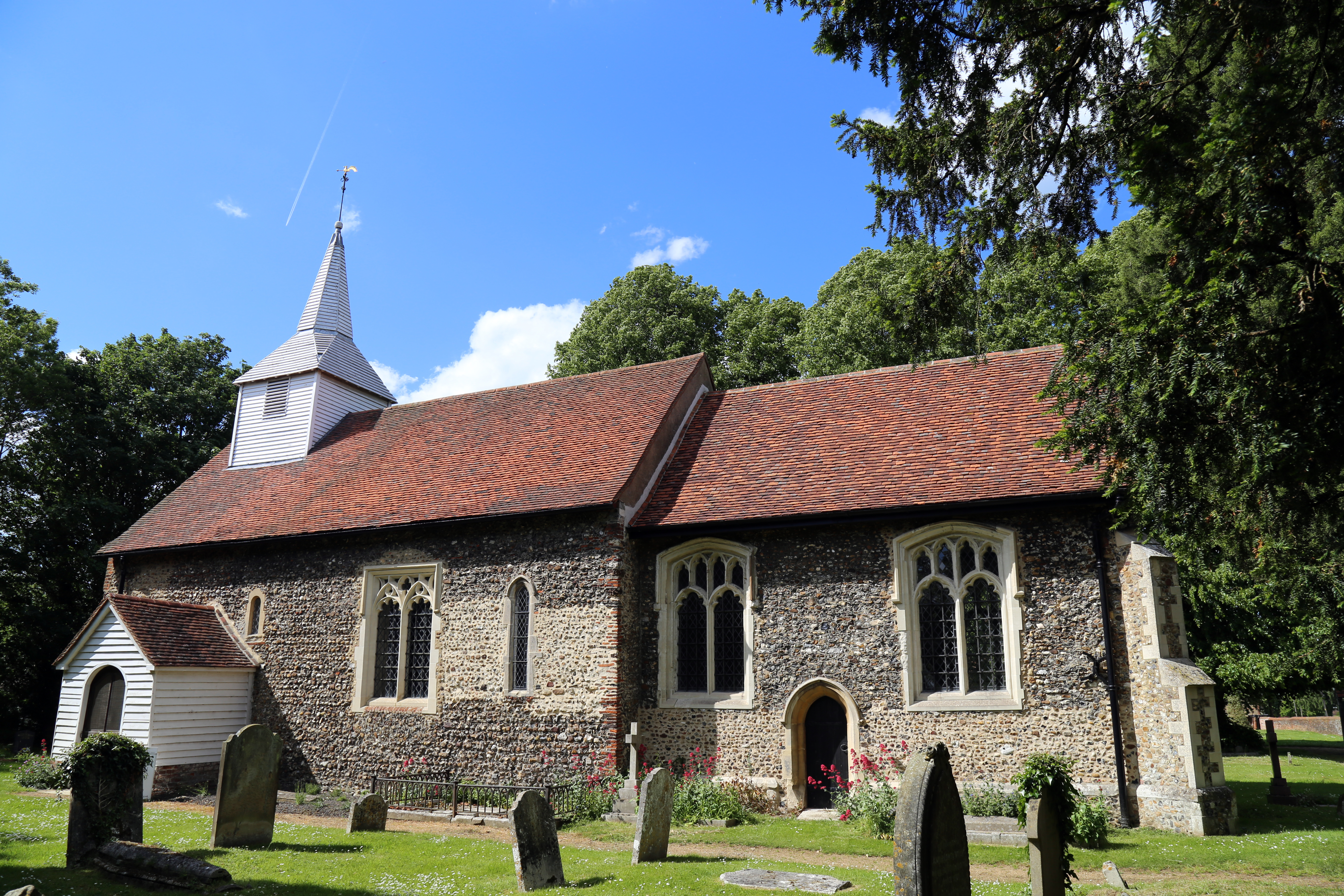
- St Andrew's Church, Willingale, from the south

- Location in Essex
- OS grid reference: TL 596 073
- Location: Willingale, Essex
- Country: England
- Denomination: Anglican
- Website: Churches Conservation Trust

Architecture
- Functional status: Redundant
- Heritage designation: Grade II*
- Designated: 20 February 1967
- Architectural type: Church
- Style: Norman, Gothic

Specifications
- Materials: Flint with some freestone and puddingstone Dressings in clunch and re-used Roman bricks Roofs tiled

St Andrew's Church is a redundant Anglican church in the village of Willingale, Essex, England. It is recorded in the National Heritage List for England as a designated Grade II* listed building, and is under the care of the Churches Conservation Trust. The church stands less than 50 yards (46 m) from the adjacent church of St Christopher, and shares its churchyard.

== History ==
The nave dates from the 12th century, and the chancel from the 15th century. During the 19th century the church was restored, and a porch and a vestry were added.

== Architecture ==
=== Exterior ===
The church is constructed in flint rubble, and contains some freestone and puddingstone. The dressings are in clunch and re-used Roman bricks. The roofs are tiled. The plan consists of a nave and chancel, with a south porch and a north vestry. At the west end is a wooden belfry and spire, both of which are weatherboarded. The east window dates from the 19th century and has three lights containing Decorated-style tracery. In the north wall of the chancel are two two-light windows from the 15th century, and between them is a blocked doorway. There are similar windows in the south wall, and a 15th-century doorway. In the north wall of the nave are two 12th-century windows with semicircular heads, and a doorway from the same period. The doorway contains a door with 12th-century scrolled ironwork. In the south wall are three windows in different styles; a 13th-century lancet window, a 14th-century two-light window, and a small window dating from the 12th century. The south porch is weatherboarded and it leads to a 12th-century doorway with a semicircular head and jambs in stone and Roman brick. The west window has a semicircular brick head, which probably dates from the 17th century.

=== Interior ===
The octagonal font dates from the late 14th century. It is decorated with quatrefoils in circles, and with panels containing carved roses and heads. In the chancel are 15th-century piscinae and an oolite altar slab with carved crosses. Also in the church are memorials dated 1614 in memory of the children of the rector. The organ was made in 1905 by Thomas S. Jones and Son, but had been removed by 1997. There are two bells in the tower, one of which has a 15th-century inscription.

== See also ==
- List of churches preserved by the Churches Conservation Trust in the East of England
