= The Rodings =

Group of villages in Essex, England

Coordinates: 51°48′N 00°18′E

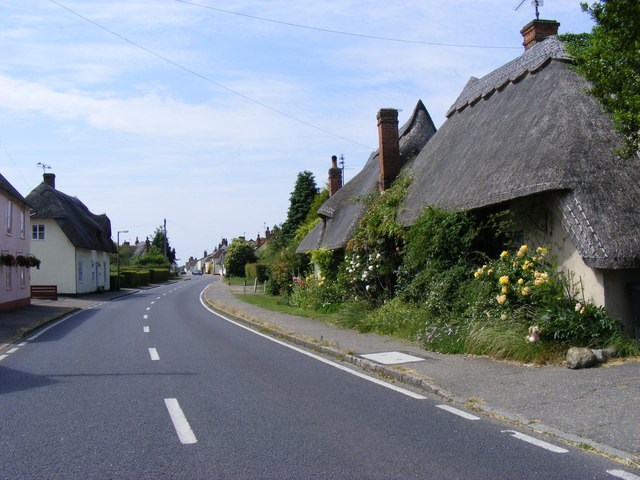
The B184 through High Roding, Essex

The Rodings /ˈroʊdɪŋz/ are a group of eight villages in the upper part of the River Roding and the west of Essex, England, the largest group in the country to bear a common name. The Rodings do not lie within a single district in the county; they are arranged around the tripoint of the administrative areas of Chelmsford, Uttlesford and Epping Forest. An alternative arcane name, linked to the Middle English Essex dialect, was The Roothings.

== History ==
The Rodings, the remnants of a single Anglo-Saxon community known as the Hroðingas, were led by Hroða; who sailed up the River Thames and along a tributary, to settle in the area in the sixth century. This was one of the tribal areas that were absorbed into the Kingdom of Essex. The River Roding and the villages derived their name from Hroða. It has been suggested that the early territory of the Rodings may also have included Willingale and Shellow Bowells, and that White Roding, which was sometimes historically called Roding Magna ("Great Roding") was the centre of the estate.

The villages are recorded in the Domesday Book of 1086 as Rodinges in the Hundred of Dunmow. In the time of Edward the Confessor, it was held by the Abbey of St Æthelthryth of Ely; however, after the Norman Conquest, part was taken by William de Warenne. Part was also held by the de Veres and de Mandevilles families, who became the Earls of Oxford and Earls of Essex. By the 14th century, the boundaries and names of the villages had become fairly established. Abbess, Beauchamp and Berners Roding now form a single parish in the district of Epping Forest.

In the second half of the 19th century The Rodings came part of the Dunmow and Ongar Unions – poor relief provision set up under the Poor Law Amendment Act 1834. The parishes were in the rural deaneries of Roding and Ongar, the Archdeaconry of Essex, and the Diocese of St Albans. In 1914 the parishes came under the Diocese of Chelmsford. Roman remains have occasionally been found in the area. Crops grown at the time were chiefly wheat, barley and beans, on a heavy soil with a clay subsoil.

== Governance ==
An electoral ward in the same name exists. The population of this ward at the 2011 Census was 1,853.

== Landmarks ==
The area is typified by medieval thatched cottages, timber-framed manor houses and farmhouses. There is a mid-18th-century post mill windmill in Aythorpe Roding, the only surviving windmill in the area. There are a number of churches dating from the Norman period; the oldest is St Margaret of Antioch in Margaret Roding, which has a Norman doorway and the tomb of a crusader.

== Roding names ==
- Abbess Roding
- Aythorpe Roding
- Beauchamp Roding (pronounced Beecham Roding)
- Berners Roding
- High Roding
- Leaden Roding
- Margaret Roding
- White Roding
- Morell Roding (previously centred on Cammas Hall, the hamlet was absorbed by White Roding; today nonexistent although a defined area of land)

== Transport links ==
A single bus service, number 59, serves White Roding, Leaden Roding and Margaret Roding. It is operated by Arriva Shires & Essex, running hourly in each direction to Harlow via Hatfield Heath and Chelmsford via Roxwell. The route is on the Hertfordshire Intalink network.

== Ecclesiastical organisation ==
In the Church of England Diocese of Chelmsford, Leaden, Abbess, White and Beauchamp Roding have formed the South Rodings parish since 2004. High and Aythorpe Roding are beneficed to Great Canfield and Margaret Roding to Good and High Easter, those 6 parishes are served by one priest-in-charge. Berners Roding is now part of the Parish of Willingale, the Parish Church of unknown dedication (but thought to be All Saints) is redundant and is privately owned.

== See also ==
- The Hundred Parishes
