= Blake Hall =

English country house

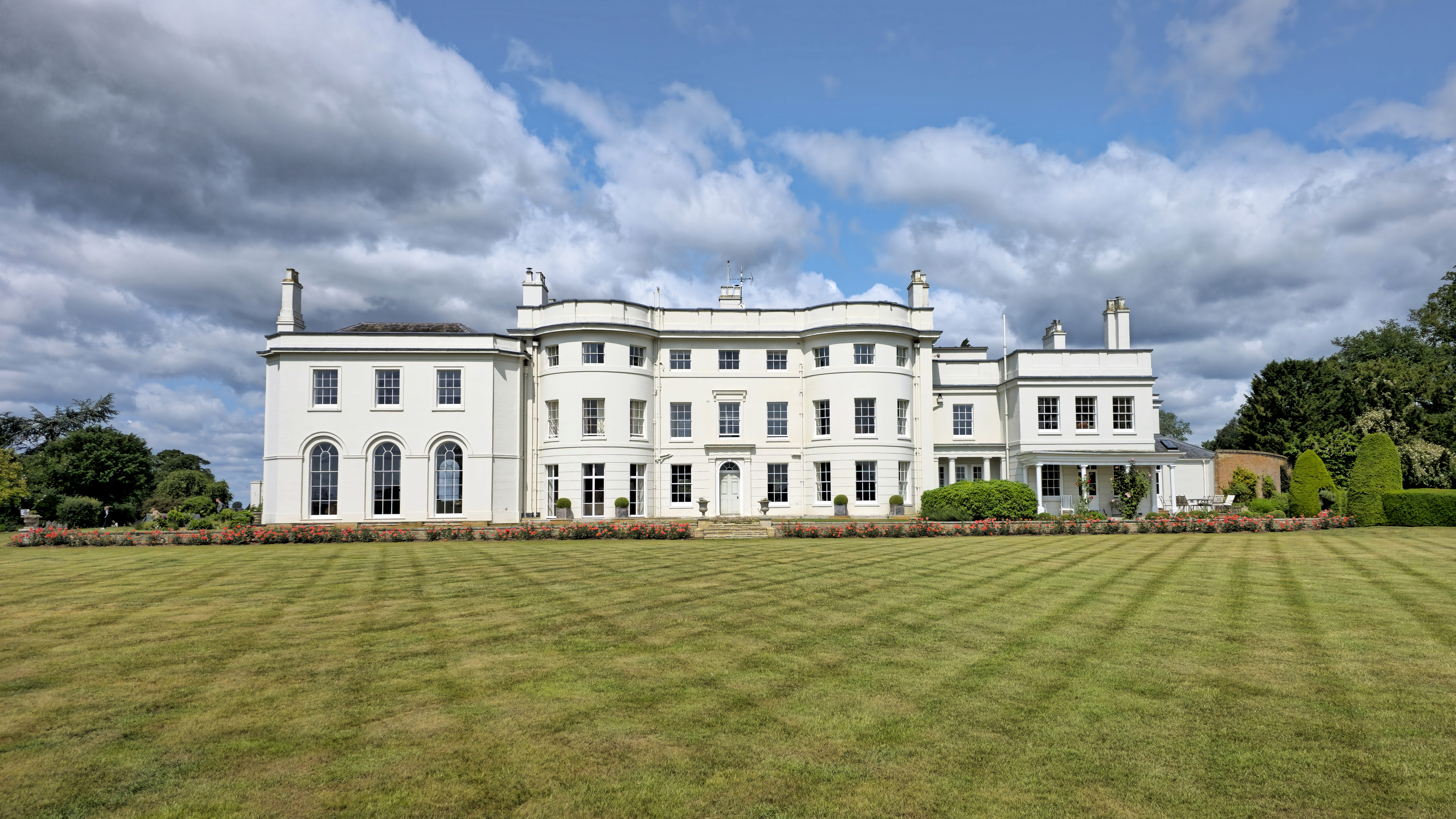
- Blake Hall, south-east aspect

- Location in Essex
- 51°43′25″N 0°13′35″E

Listed Building – Grade II*

Blake Hall is a country house within the civil parish of Bobbingworth, to the north-west of Chipping Ongar, in the county Essex, England. It is recorded in the National Heritage List for England as a Grade II* listed building, and its park and garden are Grade II listed.

== History ==
=== 1086–1314 ===
Bobbingworth, including the estate of Blake Hall, was recorded in the Domesday Book of 1086 as 'Bubingeorda'. The manor of Blake Hall itself was first recorded in the 12th century as being owned by Pharamus de Boulogne, a great-grandson of Count Eustace II of Boulogne. Upon his death, Blake Hall was inheritated his daughter Sibyl, who had married Ingelram de Fiennes. Blake Hall was passed through the de Fiennes family until it was granted to their relative Eleanor of Castile and in turn, to her grandson Gilbert de Clare, who owned it until his death at the Battle of Bannockburn in 1314.

=== 1314–1789 ===
Elizabeth de Clare inherited Blake Hall upon her brother's death. From then on, it was sold and rented out a number of times. In 1598, Robert Bourne purchased Blake Hall, but it passed to John Digby through his marriage to Alice Bourne in 1656. In 1709, John Clarke purchased it from their heirs for £8,000. During the 18th century, the Clarke family rebuilt the timber-framed manor house. Eventually, they accumulated considerable debt, which led them to sell Blake Hall to Capel Cure in 1789.

=== 1789–1915 ===
Capel Cure was the son of George Cure, a wealthy upholsterer who worked at Haymarket, London. He invested in the slave-operated 'Belvedere' plantation, producing rum and sugar, in Saint Thomas Parish, Jamaica. In 1799, Cure was made the High Sheriff of Essex. After purchasing Blake Hall in 1789, Cure worked on the house and its grounds until his death in January 1820. An 1804 estate map demonstrates that Cure had extended the house and organised new planting for the gardens.

The descendants of Capel Cure took the surname Capel-Cure. The Capel-Cure family engaged George Basevi – later the architect involved with the Fitzwilliam Museum, Cambridge – in 1822 for further alterations to the house. Pevsner attributes the house's four-column Doric porch to Basevi. George Capel-Cure later commissioned extension to the house in the mid-19th century, with the addition of the third storey and the south wing.

In April 1865, Blake Hall station was opened by the Great Eastern Railway. Although it was located more than a mile to the southwest of the house, it was named after it as the railway line ran through the estate. It operated principally as a goods station carrying agricultural produce from the nearby farms into London.

The Capel-Cures put Blake Hall up for sale in 1884, but it was not sold. In the early 20th century, the Capel-Cures bought the staircase, which Pevsner dates to c. 1698, from Schomberg House, London, and fitted it into Blake Hall.

=== 1915–1948 ===
During World War I, an auxiliary hospital was built around the tennis court, which opened in July 1915. It was affiliated to the Military Hospital at Colchester. Frederick Glyn, 4th Baron Wolverton, lent a marquee to house more beds in the summer months; by 1917, it had 39 beds. The hospital closed in May 1919.

During World War II, the operations centre at nearby RAF North Weald for Sector E, No. 11 Group RAF, was bombed by the Luftwaffe in September 1940. The floors and interior walls in the south wing and around the drawing-room and library were removed and a new "ops room" (operations room) constructed in its place. Nissen huts were put up around the grounds to accommodate those who worked there. Blake Hall was not returned to Nigel Capel-Cure until 1948.

=== After 1948 ===
Nigel Capel-Cure, a cricketer, restored Blake Hall after it was returned to him by the Ministry of Air Defence. Blake Hall remains the privately owned home of the Capel-Cures.

== Architecture ==
The present house dates to the 18th century, built by the Clarkes, but was remodelled extensively by the Capel-Cures throughout the 19th century. The earlier timber-framed manor house that the Clarkes replaced no longer survives. The building is of white stuccoed brick and grey slate hipped roofs.

The centre block of the north-west entrance front is of three storeys and seven bays. The middle three bays break forward beneath a pediment. The ground floor is band rusticated. The central porch, attributed to George Basevi, is of four Doric columns, friezed with guttae, triglyphs and metopes. To the right of the centre block lies the two-storey extension. To the left of the centre block are two two-storey ranges, the last of which forms the service wing.

The centre block of the south-east garden front has semi-circular bays to the right and left – an extension by the Capel-Cures – is of three storeys and nine bays. The central doorcase incorporates a segmental light, pilasters, frieze and a flat canopy. To the left of the centre block is the two-storey extension, matching the north-west front. To the right lies a range of two storeys and three bays, with a columnaded loggia to the ground floor.

In the hall, two Tuscan columns and pilasters form a screen to the staircase, which Pevsner dates to c. 1698, from Schomberg House on Pall Mall, London. In the library, a pair of neoclassical bookcases survive on the rear wall, following the gutting of the library for the RAF Group No. 11 operations room.
