= Latton Priory =

Historic priory in Essex, England

Coordinates: 51.7388°N 0.1209°E

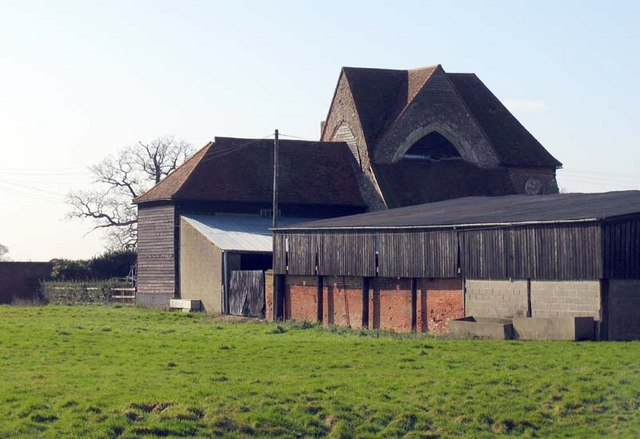
Remnants of Latton Priory in use as a farm building.

Latton Priory was a small priory in Essex, England. Its site is about 1 km south of the outskirts of the modern town of Harlow.

The priory was founded before 1292 by an ancestor of Thomas Shaa as a community of Augustinian Canons Regular, and was constructed on a moated site. The church was rebuilt in the 14th century and together with the dormitory, refectory and cellarer's range formed a square surrounding the cloisters.

The site was abandoned in 1534, just prior to the Dissolution of the Monasteries under King Henry VIII. The property was granted to Sir Henry Parker in 1536, but by 1556 had been united with the Latton Hall estate. In 1562, it became part of the Mark Hall estate, who sold it to a tenant after the Second World War.

During much of that time the priory site has functioned as a farm. The farmhouse is believed to stand on the site of the refectory and the remains of the church, a Grade II* listed building, have been incorporated into farm buildings.

In 2013, proposals were made to build 2500 houses on the site.
