= Abbess Roding =

Village in Essex, England

Coordinates: 51.7788°N 0.2759°E

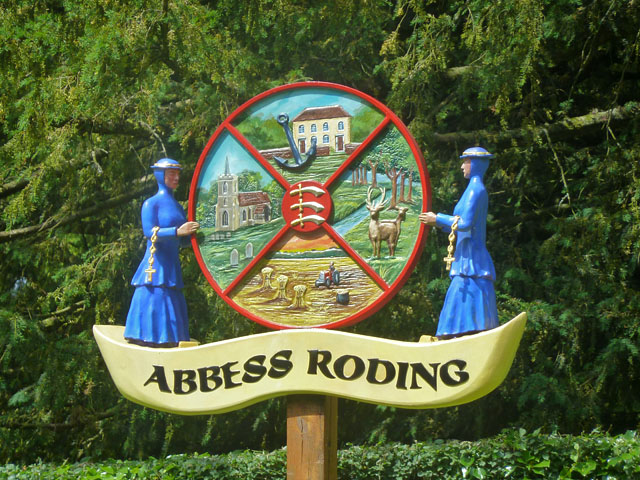
- Abbess Roding village sign

- Location within Essex
- OS grid reference: TL571113
- Civil parish: Abbess, Beauchamp and Berners Roding
- District: Epping Forest
- Shire county: Essex
- Region: East
- Country: England
- Sovereign state: United Kingdom
- Post town: ONGAR
- Postcode district: CM5
- Dialling code: 01279
- Police: Essex
- Fire: Essex
- Ambulance: East of England
- UK Parliament: Brentwood & Ongar

Abbess Roding is a village in the civil parish of Abbess Beauchamp and Berners Roding in the Epping Forest District of Essex, England. It lies 5 miles (8 km) north from Chipping Ongar, and 9 miles (14 km) west from the county town of Chelmsford. The village is one of the hamlets and villages called The Rodings. It was formerly a separate parish but merged with its neighbours Beauchamp Roding and Berners Roding to form the modern parish in 1946.

== History ==
According to A Dictionary of British Place Names, Roding derives from "Rodinges", as is listed in the Domesday Book and recorded earlier as such at c.1050, with the later variation 'Roinges Abbatisse' recorded in 1237. The 'Abbess' refers to the manorial possession by a man called 'Aitrop' held under the ownership of the Abbess of Barking Abbey.

In the Domesday account Abbess Roding is listed as in the Hundred of Ongar. The manor held 18 households, seven villagers, two smallholders, five slaves, and one freeman, with 2 lord's plough teams, 3.5 men's plough teams, 20 acres (8 ha) of meadow, and a woodland with 20 pigs. In 1066 there were 10 cattle, 40 pigs, 100 sheep and a cob. In 1086 there were 14 cattle, 60 pigs, 131 sheep, and three cobs. Before the Conquest, lordship was held by Wulfmer of Eaton Socon; after given to Eudo Dapifer who was also Tenant-in-chief to William the Conqueror. A further source, the Domesday Book: A Complete Translation, gives a Domesday record of Abbess Roding being held by Geoffrey Martel as part of the land of Geoffrey de Mandeville. Other traditional names for the village and its previous parish were 'Abbott's Roothing' or 'Abbots Roding'. It was in the Hundred of Ongar. At the Dissolution, Henry VIII sold the Barking Abbey's estate to Robert Chertsey.

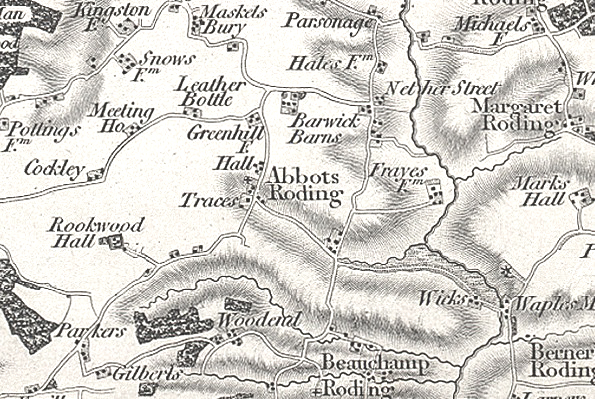
Ordnance Survey map 1805 showing 'Abbots Roding'

The parish is recorded as having two windmills during its history. The first was a sunk post mill, and was located in the manor of Barwick Bernes, but in the farming records of 1382 the mill was reported to have been broken. A second later windmill, a Post mill was built upon top of a small mound, quarter of a mile north of the church. In 1578, Elizabeth I visited Rookwood Hall as a guest of the then owner Wistan Browne. A nonconformist congregation started in a barn at Rookwood Hall during 1698, and a permanent chapel was built in 1730.

In 1845, authorisation from parliament was sought to build the Dunstable, London and Birmingham railway, which would have run from Leighton Buzzard to Maldon running through the Rodings, but authorisation was only granted to connect Dunstable to the line at Leighton Buzzard (8 & 9 Vict. c. xxxvii). In 1882 Abbess Roding was in the Ongar Union—poor relief provision set up under the Poor Law Amendment Act 1834 —and part of the Rural Deanery of Ongar. The registers of the church of St Edmund date to 1560. The church, restored in 1867, had attached an 1882 benefice of a rectory with residence, in the gift of and held by Rev. Lawrence Capel Cure of Balliol College, Oxford. Sir Henry Selwin-Ibbetson, Bt was Lord of the manor and principal landowner. There was 1,393 acres (5.6 km^{2}) of parish land supporting a population of 237. Crops grown at the time were chiefly wheat, barley and beans, on a heavy soil with a clay subsoil. Parish occupations included seven farmers, a beer retailer, and the licensee of The Anchor public house.

During World War I, non-conformists were sent to an internment camp as conscientious objectors. The camp had been set up at the Old Rectory, and was linked to the Chipping Ongar Agricultural Depot. During World War II, the lane leading from Abbess Roding to the Matching to Peartree Green road was closed to allow for the construction of RAF Matching within the parish boundary.

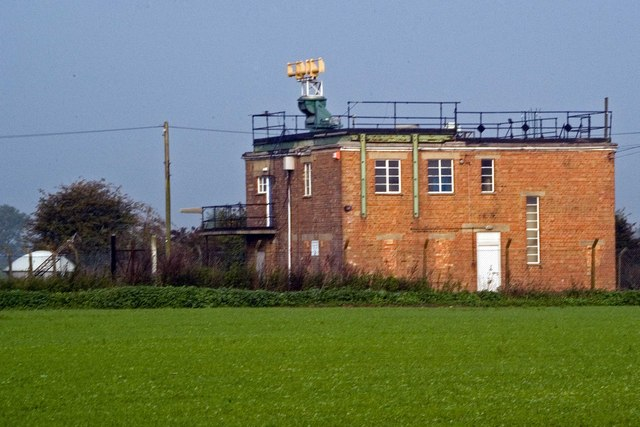
Former control tower at RAF Matching

In 1891 the parish had a population of 240, but by 1931 it had decreased to 169. On 1 April 1946 the parish was merged with Beauchamp Roding and Berners Roding to form a new civil parish called Abbess Beauchamp and Berners Roding.

== Geology ==
The soil is made up of glacial sand and gravel, head gravel and alluvium on the London Clay formation. Bore holes opposite St Edmund's church recorded the depth of the clay at 37.5 metres (123 ft). Further studies have shown that a fragment of the former floor of the Thames Estuary was found 145 feet below the village. The Rodings area is regarded as the second best ploughing country, second only to the Holderness in Yorkshire.

== Governance ==
=== Parliamentary seat ===
The village is in the parliamentary constituency of Brentwood & Ongar, with Alex Burghart serving as the MP since 2017.

=== Local government ===
Abbess Roding sits within the non-metropolitan county of Essex, governed by Essex County Council; and the non-Metropolitan district of Epping Forest, which is governed by Epping Forest District Council. The village is within the ward of Rural East. The village is locally served by Abbess, Beauchamp and Berners Roding Parish Council.

== Demographics ==
=== Population ===
The population of the parish was recorded from the first census in the United Kingdom in 1801, until the final census in 1951, which was after the parish was dissolved.

Census	Population
1801	205
1811	215
1821	236
1831	234
1841	254
1851	216
1861	220
1871	259
1881	231
1891	240
1901	213
1911	206
1921	175
1931	169
1951	228

=== Occupations ===
Over the censuses between 1841 and 1951, the records show the parish residents working in the following occupations:

Occupation	1841	1901	1951
Professions	1	4	7
Farmers	5	7	8
Agricultural workers	51	34	30
Private domestic servants	16	14	4
Carpenters / Carpenter's Journeymen	-	-	2
Cooper	1	-	-
Grocer	1	-	-
Shoemaker and assistants	1	-	-
Bricklayers and assistants	-	-	1
Baker	-	1	-

== Hamlets ==
=== Abbess End ===
Abbess End is a hamlet close to the southern end of Abbess Roding, and north of the former site of the moated country house Rookwood Hall.

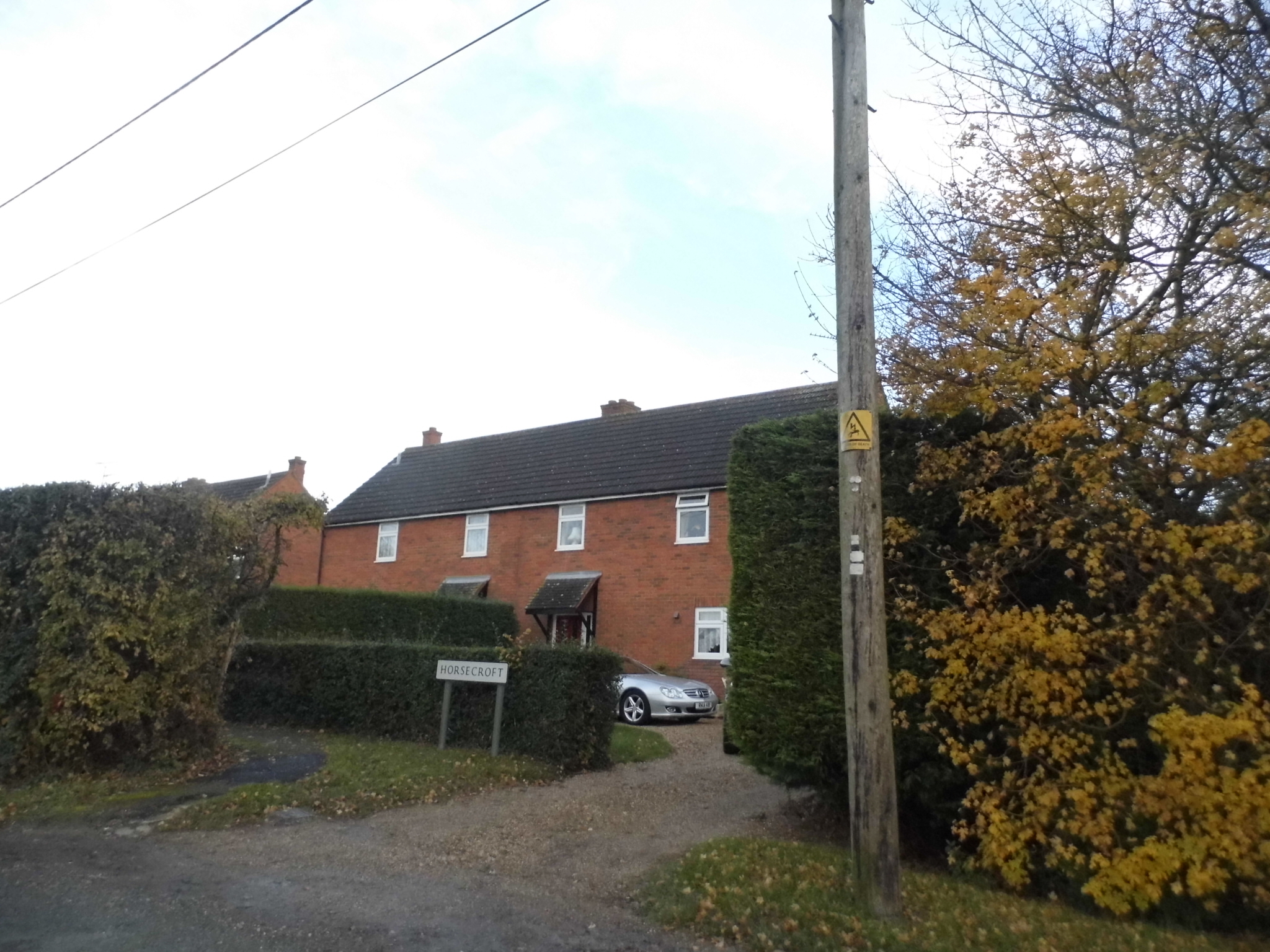
Horsecroft at Abbess End

=== Berwick Bernes ===
Berwick Bernes, also known as Barwick Bernes, was a hamlet in the parish of Abbess Roding. It was formerly one of the manors of the parish, along with Rockwood Hall, and owned by the Berners family who also owned the manor at Berners Roding. It is now regarded as part of the village of Abbess Roding.

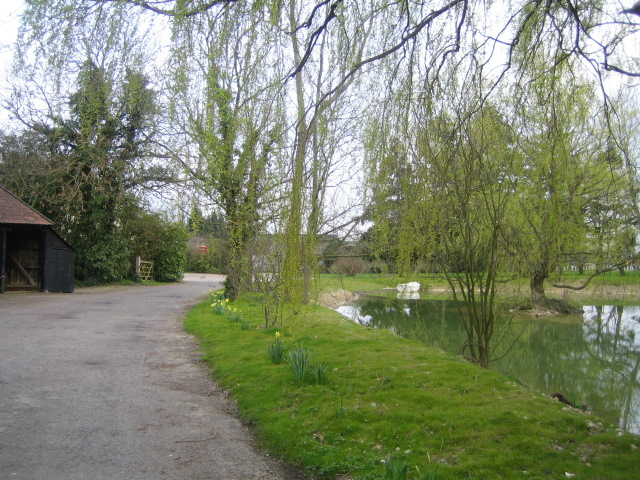
Pond at Berwick Bernes Hall, which may have been part of a moat

=== Nether Street ===
The hamlet of Nether Street was named in 1777 after a 13th century knight called Sir Walter de Netherstrete. The hamlet is now regarded as part of the village.

== Buildings, structures and attractions ==
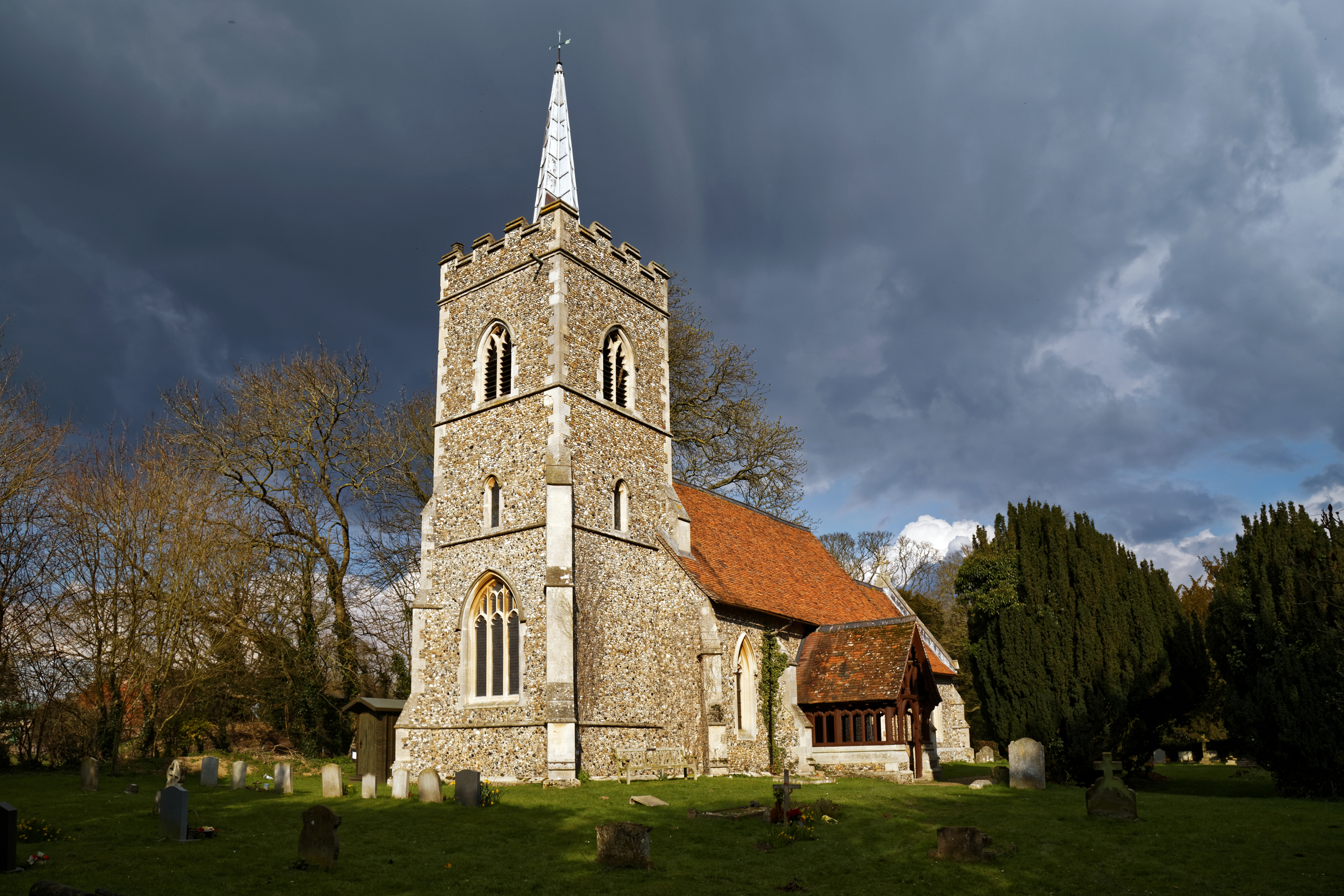
St. Edmund's Church

The village has several properties that are listed on the National Heritage List for England. An area around St. Edmund church is a local designated conservation area.

The village's church, St Edmunds is Grade II listed. The building is of 14th, 15th and 19th century construction, however the font is earlier being dated from the 12th century. The font is square in shape, but is cracked and is held together by an iron band. Evidence of a Roman road has been found near both Rockwood Hall and Berwick Berners Hall, and is recorded as the 4th widest Roman road found within the United Kingdom. It is believed to be part of the Suffolk Way.

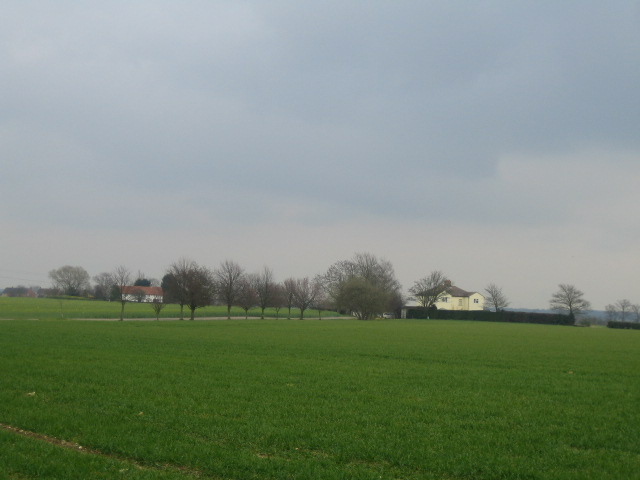
Roman Road near Abbess End

The Three Forests Way footpath runs through the village.

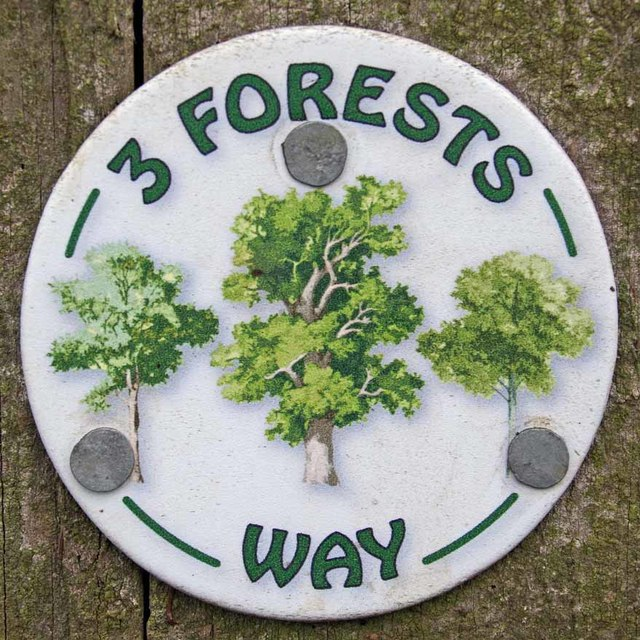
Three Forests Way waymark

=== Listed buildings and structures ===
Title	List entry number	Date first listed	Grade Listing	Description	National Grid reference	Reference
Abbess Roding Hall, including Pump and Garden	1337213	29 June 1984	II	16th century, possibly earlier, timber framed and plastered 'U' shaped house	TL 57212 11582	
Granary to north of Abbess Roding Hall	1111332	29 June 1984	II	16th century, possibly earlier, timber framed, 3 bay building	TL 57222 11606	
Barn to South West of Abbess Roding Hall	1337214	29 June 1984	II	16th century 7 bay timber barn	TL 57194 11512	
Church of St Edmund	1111331	20 February 1967	II	14th, 15th and 19th century parish church.	TL 57178 11438	
Clare House	1111339	29 June 1984	II	Circa. 1600 timber framed and plastered house	TL 57127 11244	
Fairlands including attached garden wall and pump	1165784	29 August 1984	II*	15th and 16th century timber framed and plastered house, with red brick garden wall, a cast iron pump and the remains of a moat.	TL 55794 11455	
Falkners	1337219	29 June 1984	II	16th century, possibly earlier, timber framed and plastered house	TL 56578 10843	
Granary, Barn and Outbuilding west of Green Hill and pump	1165801	29 June 1984	II	18th and 19th century weatherboarded granary	TL 57195 11954	
Longbarns Farmhouse	1337220	27 August 1957	II	17th and 15th century, possibly earlier, timber framed and plastered farmhouse.	TL 57825 10878	
The Old Post Office	1111333	29 June 1984	II	17th century, possibly earlier, timber framed and plastered former Georgian post office.	TL 57207 11316	
Pump, 3m to the west of the Old Post Office	1337215	29 June 1984	II	19th century cast iron pump	TL 57195 11310	
Post Cottages	1111334	29 June 1984	II	17th century, possibly earlier, timber framed and plastered cottages	TL 57207 11309	
Barn north east of Rookwood Hall	1111340	20 February 1967	II*	15th century timber framed and weatherboarded barn that was originally a dwelling.	TL 56084 11006	
Barn North East of Rookwood Hall and South East of Item 2/4	1251306	20 February 1967	I	15th century 8 bay timber framed barn, part weatherboard, part plastered. Moated site	TL 56092 10987	
Sparrows	1165528	29 June 1984	II	14th century, possibly earlier, timber framed and plastered house	TL 56767 10867	

== Notable people ==
- Bertha Bacon (1866–1922), suffragette and tax resister.
- Sir Gamaliel Capell (1561–1613), Member of Parliament, owned Rookwood Hall.
- John Thurloe (1616–1668), secretary to the council of state in Protectorate England and spymaster for Oliver Cromwell, was born here.
- Sir Anthony Browne (1509–1567), Judge, Chief Justice of the Common Pleas and founder of Brentwood School, Essex
