= Nether Hall, Roydon =

Manor in Roydon, Essex, England

Nether Hall
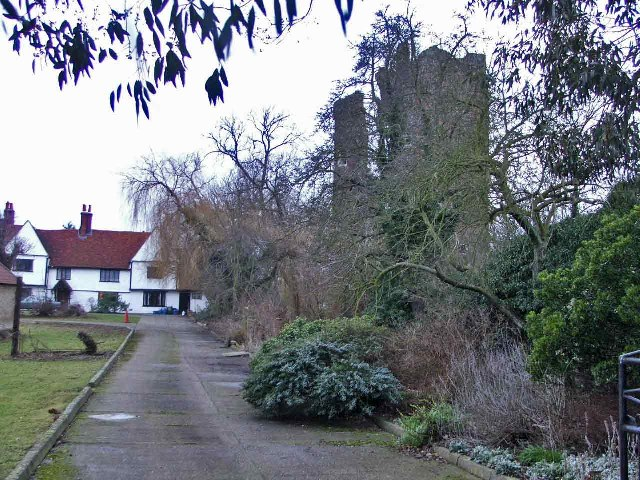
- Ruins of Nether Hall with farmhouse in background

- Location within Essex Location within England
- Interactive map of Nether Hall
- 51°45′20″N 0°01′25″E
- Location: Netherhall Road; Roydon, Essex, England
- OS grid reference: TL 39776 08271

Listed Building – Grade I
- Designated: 3 July 1984
- Reference no.: 1182255

Nether Hall or Netherhall is a former manor in Roydon, Essex, England. Established during the medieval period, Nether Hall contained two manor houses built in the mid-15th century and occupied by the Colte family. Thomas More married one of the Colte daughters and visited Nether Hall during their courtship.

Although the central part of the manor, including one of the houses, was demolished in the 1770s, it is a scheduled monument and the ruined gatehouse is a Grade I listed building with Historic England. Several outer farm buildings, including the other manor house, are still standing and are also listed buildings.

== Naming ==
Nether Hall was named for its low position at the confluence of River Lea and River Stort.

== History ==
=== Establishment ===
The land that became Nether Hall was originally on one hide of land owned by Ranulf brother of Ilger in 1086. The entirety of Ranulf's land was eventually divided among four manors: Nether Hall, Down Hall, Roydon Hall, and Temple Roydon. Nether Hall itself sat on Roydon's boundary with the parish of Nazeing. By the 13th century, Waltham Abbey had control of the manor, as well as the remainder or Ranulf's Nazeing demesne lands; during that century, a manor house existed on the grounds.

The earliest record of tenancy in Nether Hall dates to the 14th century, when John Organ, a mercer from London, bought its lease. His son, Thomas Organ, took over the lease upon John's death c. 1392. Thomas either sold it in 1401 to Thomas Prudence and Nicholas Collorn, or in 1406 to Simon Barnwell. By 1427, a new owner, John Tattle, held the manor; that year, he sold it to Nazeing resident Peter Shelley.

=== Colte family ===
During the 15th to 17th centuries, Nether Hall became the seat of the noble Colte (Note: The Colte family name is alternately spelled "Colt" in several sources; the "Colte" spelling is used here for consistency.) family. A soldier during the War of the Roses, Thomas Colte, saved the life of King Edward IV in battle and was subsequently knighted and gifted property in Essex, including Nether Hall. However, the Crown seized these lands in 1460, and Colte did not recover them until after Edward IV rose to the throne in 1471. Nether Hall then passed down through his family's lineage as follows:

- 1471–1475: Jane Colte, widow of Thomas
- 1475–1521: Sir John Colte, their son
- 1521–1579: Sir George Colte, his son
- 1579–1615: Sir George Colte, his grandson
- 1615–1635: Sir Henry Colte, his son
- 1635–1658: George Colte, his son

Either Thomas or John Colte had two manor houses constructed on the site. The main one was built of brick, featured a three-story brick gatehouse and was surrounded by a curtain wall and moat. The second was a timber-framed structure adjacent to the first.

John Colte's daughter, Jane, married Thomas More. More arrived at Nether Hall during the first years of the 16th century to commence a courtship. The first Sir George Colte, More's brother-in-law, would later attend Lincoln's Inn on More's recommendation.

John Colte spent much of the family fortune at King Henry VIII's court. The Colte family began letting the manor out to tenants, including to Edward Baeshe, a naval administrator for Queen Elizabeth I. In 1631, Sir Henry Colte sold it to John Brooke, although he retained a share. His son George Colte obtained this share in 1635, although by this time, only a fraction of the estate still belonged to the Colte family, much of its remainder having been squandered away by his father. He was wounded while fighting for Charles II in the Battle of Worcester, fled the country for France, and died in Flanders in 1658, ending the Colte line of succession.

John Brooke's son sold it to John Archer in 1680. The Archer family held Nether Hall and surrounding estates until after World War I.

=== Demolition and preservation ===
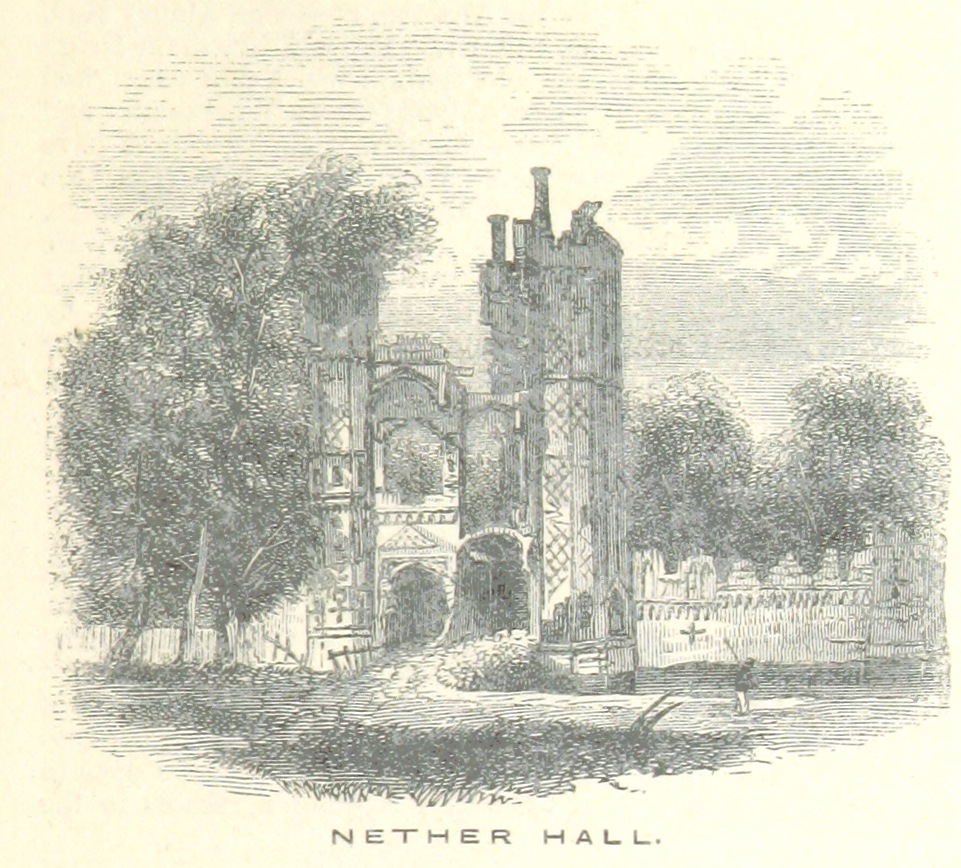
1851 illustration of the gatehouse ruins

By the 1770s, the manor was in a state of disrepair. The brick manor house and all other buildings inside the curtain walls were demolished for materials, except for the gatehouse, which still stands in ruin. Reportedly, the gatehouse proved too difficult to destroy, and to save further expense, it was spared.

By 1882, the manor was functioning as a farm. The manor site was later designated a scheduled monument, and on 3 July 1984, Historic England named the gatehouse as a Grade I listed building. Several outbuildings and structures, which survived demolition and are still standing, are also listed: the timber-framed house (Grade II*), granary (Grade II), barn (Grade II*), and garden wall (Grade II*).

== See also ==
- Grade I listed buildings in Essex
