= Gerald Barry (British Army officer) =

English army officer and cricketer (1896–1977)

Personal information
- Full name: Gerald Barry
- Born: 18 December 1896; Westminster, London
- Died: 21 February 1977 (aged 80); Great Witchingham, Norfolk
- Bowling: Fast-medium bowler
- Role: Nobody

Domestic team information
- Years: Team
- 1922: Combined Services
- First-class debut: 10 May 1922 Combined Services v Essex
- Last First-class: 10 May 1922 Combined Services v Essex

Career statistics
Competition	First-class
Matches	1
Runs scored	2
Batting average	1.00
100s/50s	0/0
Top score	2
Balls bowled	132
Wickets	0
Bowling average	>68
5 wickets in innings	0
10 wickets in match	0
Best bowling	0–11
Catches/stumpings	0/0
- Source: CricketArchive

Gerald Barry MC (18 December 1896 – 21 February 1977) was a career officer in the British Army who played in one first-class cricket match for the Combined Services against Essex.

== Early life and education ==
Gerald Berry was born on 18 December 1896 in Westminster, London to Grace Murray (1873–1960) and William James Berry (1864–1952). He attended Eton College in Windsor, United Kingdom, from January 1910 to August 1914. He was also educated at Royal Military College, Sandhurst, United Kingdom. Barry married Lady Margaret Pleydell-Bouverie, daughter of Jacob Pleydell-Bouverie, 6th Earl of Radnor in 1923. They had five daughters and one son.

== Career ==
He joined the Coldstream Guards in the First World War. He was awarded the Military Cross. He rose to the tank of lieutenant colonel in the Black Watch, and later rose to the ranking of Captain. During the Second World War, his postings included deputy military secretary of the Eastern Army in India.

In the match, played at Leyton in May 1922, Barry batted at No 10 in the Services team's two innings and scored only two runs, and opened the bowling in each Essex innings without taking a wicket. He did not play first-class cricket again.His brother-in-law was Nigel Capel-Cure, who also played one first-class cricket match.

== Death ==
He died on 21 February 1977, although not war related.
