= Luckyn baronets =

Title in the Baronetage of England

There have been two baronetcies created for persons with the surname Luckyn, both in the Baronetage of England.

The Luckyn Baronetcy, of Little Waltham in the County of Essex, was created in the Baronetage of England on 2 March 1629 for William Luckyn. For more information on this creation, see the Earl of Verulam.

The Luckyn Baronetcy, of Waltham in the County of Essex, was created in the Baronetage of England on 15 November 1661 for William Luckyn. The title became extinct on the death of the second Baronet in circa 1700.

== Luckyn baronets, of Little Waltham (1629) ==
- see the Earl of Verulam

== Luckyn baronets, of Waltham (1661) ==
- Sir William Luckyn, 1st Baronet (c. 1633 – c. 1678)
- Sir William Luckyn, 2nd Baronet (died c. 1700)
