= Magdalen Laver =

Village in Essex, England

Coordinates: 51.753°N 0.186°E

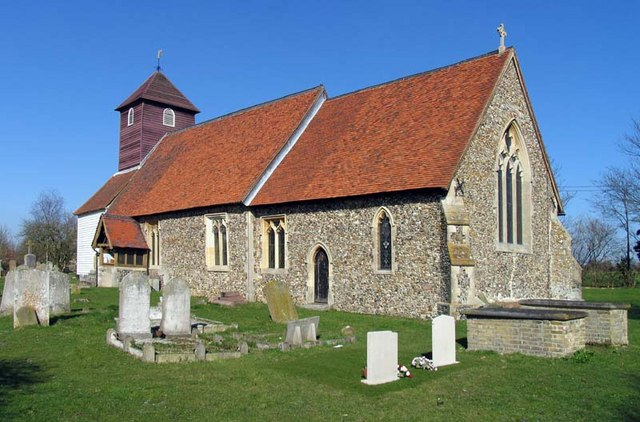
- Church of St Mary Magdalen

- Location within Essex
- Population: 234 (Parish, 2021)
- OS grid reference: TL 50802 08066
- Civil parish: Magdalen Laver
- District: Epping Forest
- Shire county: Essex
- Region: East
- Country: England
- Sovereign state: United Kingdom
- Post town: ONGAR
- Postcode district: CM5
- Dialling code: 01279
- Police: Essex
- Fire: Essex
- Ambulance: East of England
- UK Parliament: Epping Forest

Magdalen Laver is a village and civil parish in the Epping Forest district of Essex, England. It lies east of Harlow and in close proximity to the M11 motorway. Magdalen Laver has a village hall and a church called St Mary Magdalen. At the 2021 census the parish had a population of 234.

== History ==
John Marius Wilson's Imperial Gazetteer of England and Wales, described Magdalen Laver between 1870 and 1872 as:

"A parish in Epping district, Essex; 4¼ miles NW of Ongar, and 4 SE of Harlow r. station."

In the same description, Wilson states that the total population at the time was 213.

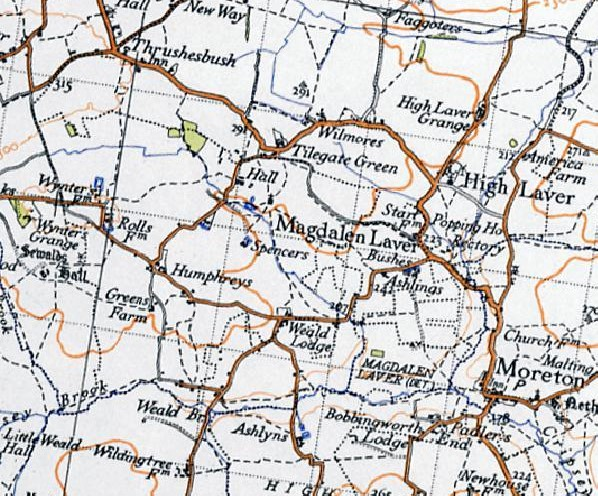
An excerpt of a 20th-century Ordnance Survey map showing Magdalen Laver.

== Population ==
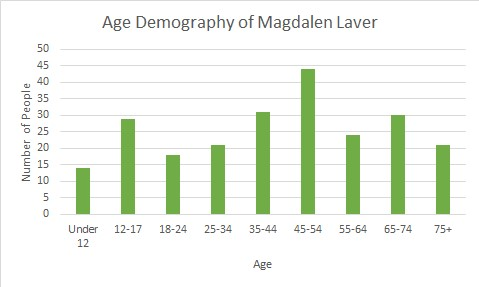
A table showing the age demography of Magdalen Laver in 2011.

According to the 2011 census, Magdalen Laver had a population of 232 usual residents. As shown in the table below, Magdalen Laver was subject fluctuating population numbers between 1801 and 1901 which may be due to changes to census boundary areas during that time. From 1931 to 1961 the population consistently, which in part may be due to more farmers moving into the area due to support the agricultural output needed to sustain Great Britain's efforts during and post World War 2.

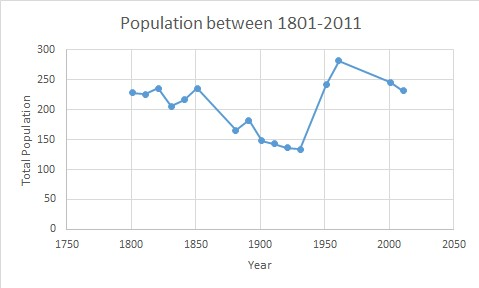
Total Population of Magdalen Laver Civil Parish, Essex, between as reported by the Census of Population from 1801 to 1961.

== Notable residents ==
Simon Horemed was the parson in 1349.

Rev. William Webb Ellis (1806–1872) was Rector of Magdalen Laver in 1855.

== Demography ==
Magdalen Laver has a majority white population with 98.3% of people being from a white ethnic group according to the 2011 census. As can be seen by the graph, the majority of people, 44 people, are aged between 45 and 54. 22% percent of Magdalen Laver residents are 65 or over but with 49% of the population being aged 44 and under, this indicates a balanced population in terms of age.

== Economy ==
Historically, the economy of Magdalen Laver was dominated by agriculture. In 1801, 36 people worked in agriculture. The dominance of agriculture in Magdalen Laver can be explained by the large amount of arable land in the area. In 1847, it was estimated that 835 acres of land was arable. According to the 2011 census, 37 people now work as a manager or senior official, suggesting that the area is now largely a commuter area. The 2011 census showed that the unemployment rate in Magdalen Laver was just 1.5%, considerably lower than the national average at 8.1%, suggesting a strong local economy.

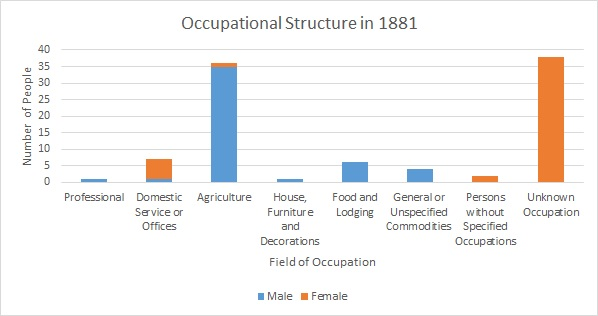
The occupational structure of Magdalen Laver in 1881 according to http://www.visionofbritain.org.uk/

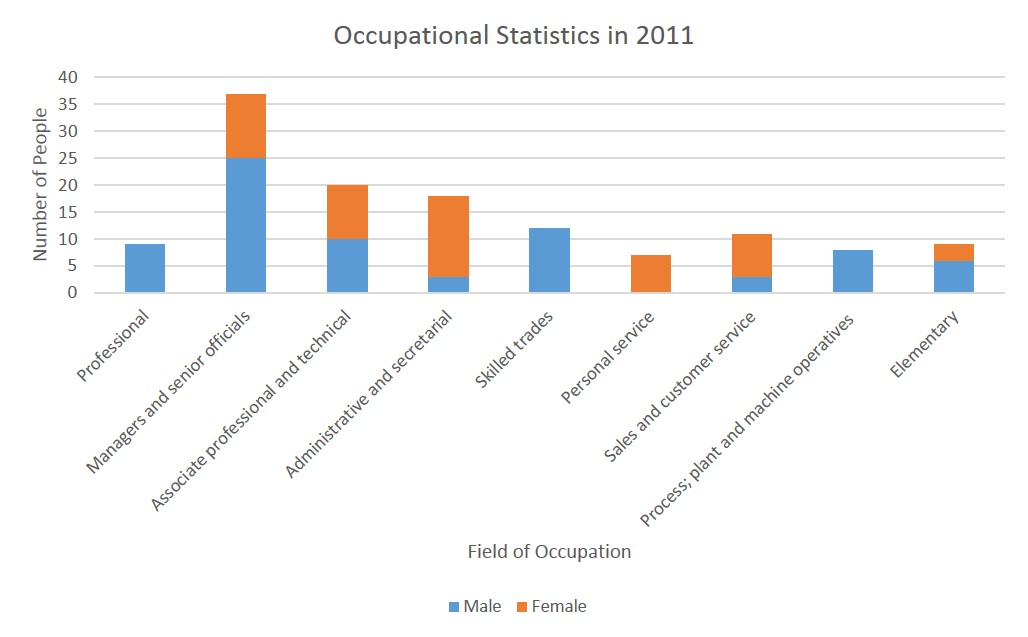
The occupational structure of Magdalen Laver in 2011 according to The Office of National Statistics.

== Education ==
There has not been a school in Magdalen Laver since 1952. Previously, in the 19th century, the population of the parish was too poor to sustain one but by 1818, a small school was founded. A permanent school was built in 1862 on land given by Anna Maria Meyer which was able to accommodate 60 students. Currently, the closest school to Magdalen Laver is Moreton Church of England Voluntary Aided Primary School which is situated 1.83 miles away. Of the 198 usual 16 and over residents living in Magdalen Laver, 15.2% have no qualifications whilst 25.3% have Level 4 qualifications and above.

== Religion ==
The Parish Church of Saint Mary Magdalen was built in the 12th century and consists of nave, chancel, west tower, and a south porch. The walls are made of flint rubble and Roman brick and the tower from timber. The church has been a Grade II listed building since 20 February 1967. According to the 2011 census, 68.5% of the population identified themselves as Christian and 21.6% as of "No Religion".
