= Abbess, Beauchamp and Berners Roding =

Civil parish in Essex, England

Coordinates: 51.7722°N 0.2863°E

Abbess Beauchamp and Berners Roding
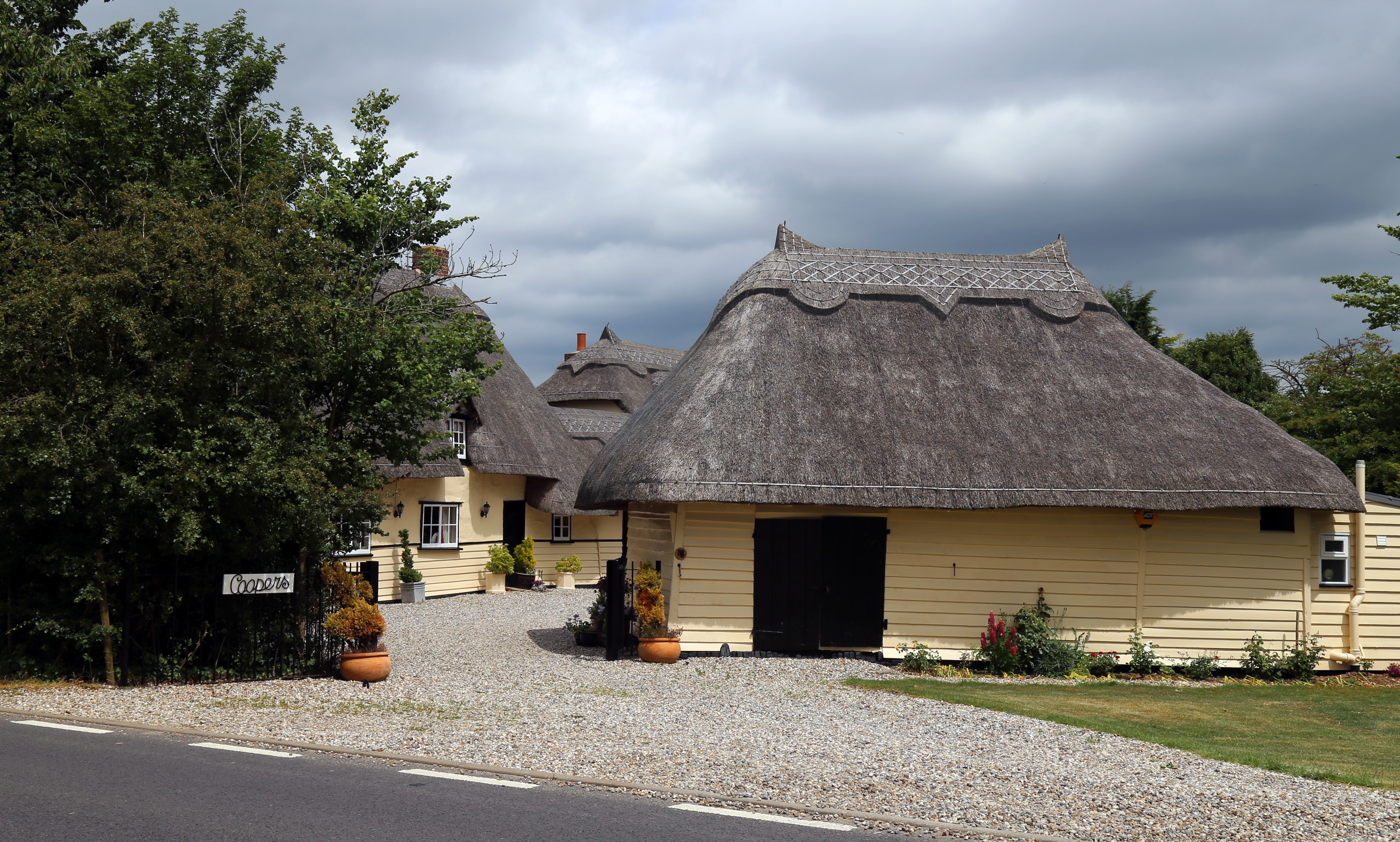
- 'Coopers', a house at Beauchamp Roding

- Location within Essex
- Interactive map of Abbess Beauchamp and Berners Roding
- Population: 506 (Parish, 2021)
- Civil parish: Abbess Beauchamp and Berners Roding
- District: Epping Forest
- Shire county: Essex
- Region: East
- Country: England
- Sovereign state: United Kingdom
- Post town: Ongar
- Postcode district: CM5
- Dialling code: 01279
- Police: Essex
- Fire: Essex
- Ambulance: East of England
- UK Parliament: Brentwood and Ongar

Abbess Beauchamp and Berners Roding is a civil parish in the Epping Forest District of Essex, England. It was created in 1946 as a merger of the three former parishes of Abbess Roding, Beauchamp Roding, and Berners Roding, three of The Rodings. At the 2021 census the parish had a population of 506.

== History ==
The parish was formed in 1946 when the three former parishes merged.

== Governance ==
Abbess Beauchamp and Berners Roding Parish Council meets at the village hall on Dunmow Road in Beauchamp Roding, known as the Room in the Rodings.
