= Bobbingworth =

Village in Essex, England

Coordinates: 51.7295°N 0.2214°E

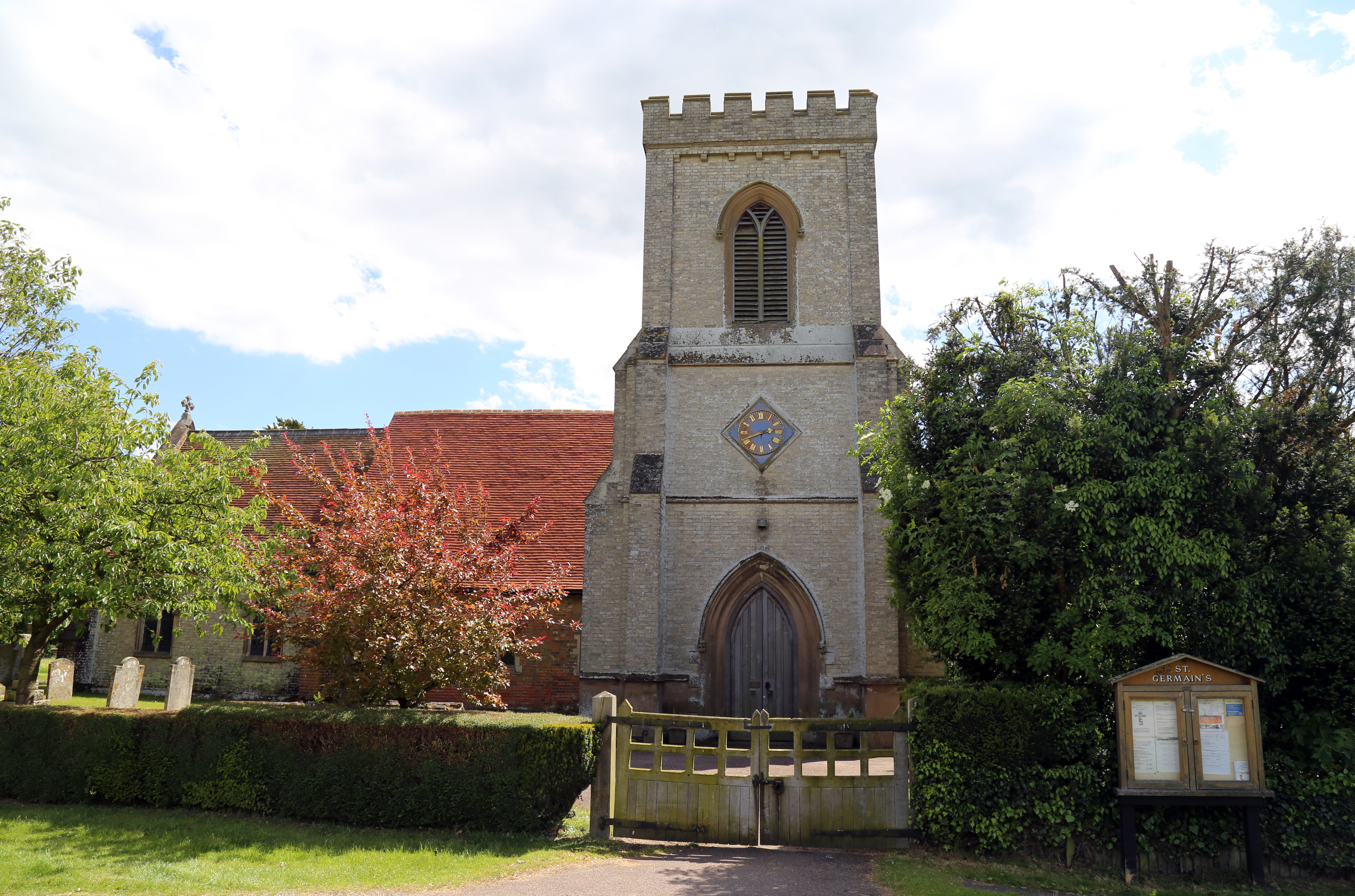
- St Germain's Church, Bobbingworth

- Location within Essex
- Interactive map of Bobbingworth
- Population: 340 (Parish, 2021)
- OS grid reference: TL535057
- Civil parish: Bobbingworth
- District: Epping Forest
- Shire county: Essex
- Region: East
- Country: England
- Sovereign state: United Kingdom
- Post town: ONGAR
- Postcode district: CM5
- Dialling code: 01277
- Police: Essex
- Fire: Essex
- Ambulance: East of England
- UK Parliament: Brentwood & Ongar

Bobbingworth is a village and civil parish in the Epping Forest district of Essex, England. The village is situated approximately 3 miles (5 km) north-west from Chipping Ongar, 10 miles (16 km) west from the county town of Chelmsford, and lies off the A414 road. Bobbingworth is in the parliamentary constituency of Brentwood & Ongar.

The parish covers an area of 2,595 acres (10.50 km^{2}). At the 2021 census the parish had a population of 340.

A notable building in Bobbingworth is Blake Hall, which, after the bombing of the North Weald Aerodrome in September 1940 (during the Second World War) became the R.A.F. Station Headquarters. Blake Hall tube station, now closed and to the south of the village, was named after the building.

== Bobbingworth School ==
Bobbingworth School and adjacent teacher's residence, since closed and converted into residential property, were built in 1855–6 by the Capel Cure family, who own Blake Hall. It was built as 'a good substantial schoolroom' and until 1869 was solely attended by girls. In 1871, however, the pupils included 18 boys, an addition made possibly in anticipation of the requirements of the Education Act. In the same year, an inspector reported to the Education Department that only 47 places were needed to secure universal elementary schooling in the parish and that 55 places were available at the school.

The Capel Cures continued to support the school until 1904, apparently without assistance from public funds, retaining it as their property but allowing it to be administered as a Church school. An inspector, visiting it in 1896, found the buildings in good repair but the scholastic standard low. The school did not officially pass under the control of the Essex Education Committee until some three years after the 1902 Education Act.
