= Willingale, Essex =

Village in Essex, England

Coordinates: 51°45′N 0°19′E

Willingale
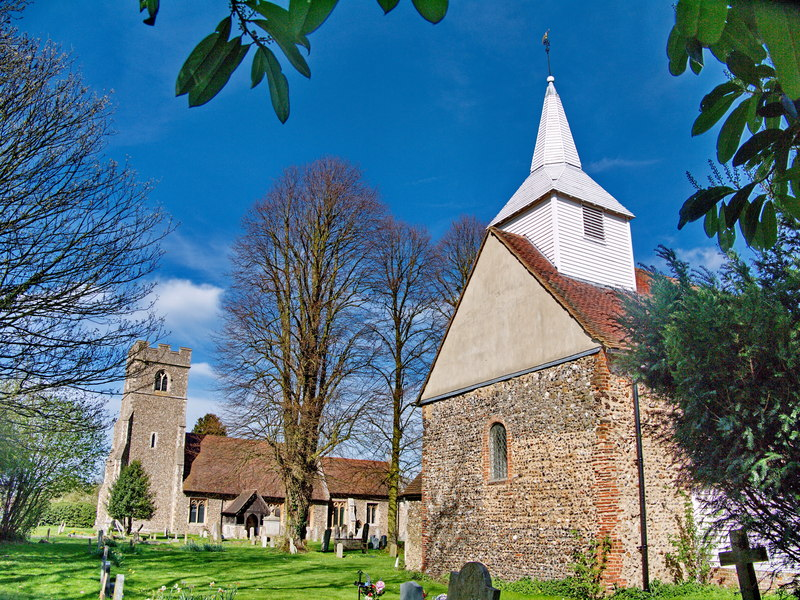
- Willingale's adjoining churches: St Andrew's to the right and St Christopher's in the background to left

- Location within Essex
- Population: 531 (Parish, 2021)
- Civil parish: Willingale
- District: Epping Forest
- Shire county: Essex
- Region: East
- Country: England
- Sovereign state: United Kingdom
- Post town: Ongar
- Postcode district: CM5
- Police: Essex
- Fire: Essex
- Ambulance: East of England

Willingale is a village and civil parish in the Epping Forest district of Essex, England. The civil parish also includes the village of Shellow Bowells and the hamlet of Miller's Green. At the 2021 census the parish had a population of 531.

== History ==
The name Willingale means the nook of land of Willa's people.

In Saxon times, Willingale and neighbouring Shellow Bowells appear to have formed part of the extensive Roding estate, which subsequently fragmented into multiple manors and parishes. Willingale had become a separate vill by the time of the Domesday Book of 1086 when it was listed as "Willingehala" in the Dunmow hundred and was split into four estates or manors.

No priest or church is mentioned at Willingale in the Domesday Book, but it came to form two parishes. One of the manors in the Domesday Book had been owned by Hervey of Spain, and that manor became known as Willingale Spain. A church dedicated to St Andrew and All Saints was built in the manor of Willingale Spain; the church is mentioned in documents from around 1120 and the surviving building also dates back to the 12th century.

To the north of Willingale Spain was the manor of Willingale Doe, named after the D'Ou or D'Eu family, who had been tenants of the manor in the reign of Henry II in the 12th century. In the 14th century a second church was built at Willingale, in the manor of Willingale Doe. The church, dedicated to St Christopher, stands immediately north of the older St Andrew's Church and they share a churchyard, with a line of trees marking the old manor and parish boundary between them.

At that time, a lord of the manor who made their manor also a parish by providing a church could gain some control over the tithes payable from the parish and also the advowson (the right to nominate priests when a vacancy arose in the parish). It seems unlikely that the population of Willingale was ever large enough to need two churches to accommodate all the worshippers, and it is therefore more likely that some dispute led to the lords of the manor of Willingale Doe deciding to build a new church. Writing in the 19th century, the Essex Archaeological Society noted a local legend of two angry sisters as being the reason for the two adjoining churches, but found no direct evidence to corroborate the legend.

From the 14th century, Willingale was therefore split between the two parishes of Willingale Spain and Willingale Doe. The boundaries between them were complicated. The parish of Willingale Doe also almost surrounded the small neighbouring parish of Shellow Bowells, adjoining it to the north, west, and south.

Willingale Doe and Shellow Bowells became a united benefice in 1798. In 1924 it was decided that Willingale Spain, Willingale Doe, and Shellow Bowells would be combined into a single ecclesiastical parish next time a vacancy arose in one of the two benefices. The merged ecclesiastical parish came into effect in 1928.

The older St Andrew's Church was subsequently declared redundant and is now in the care of the Churches Conservation Trust. St Christopher's now serves as the parish church for the united parish.

Although Willingale Spain, Willingale Doe, and Shellow Bowells had been united into a single ecclesiastical parish in 1928, they remained separate civil parishes until 1946, when they were likewise merged into a new civil parish called Willingale.

== Notable residents ==
Richard Wiseman (1632 - 1712), landowner and member of parliament was born in the village.

Clopton Havers (24 February 1657 – April 1702) was an English physician who did pioneering research on the microstructure of bone. He is believed to have been the first person to observe and almost certainly the first to describe what are now called Haversian canals and Sharpey's fibres. Havers married Dorcas Fuller, daughter of Thomas Fuller, the Rector of Willingale, Essex. Havers died in Willingale in 1702 and was buried at Willingale Doe, Essex. His funeral sermon, dedicated to his widow, was preached by Lilly Butler, minister of St Mary Aldermanbury in London, and was later printed in quarto.

== See also ==
- RAF Chipping Ongar, a former World War II airfield
