= Pitchford Hall =

Grade I listed building in Shropshire, UK

Coordinates: 52.6338°N 2.6991°W

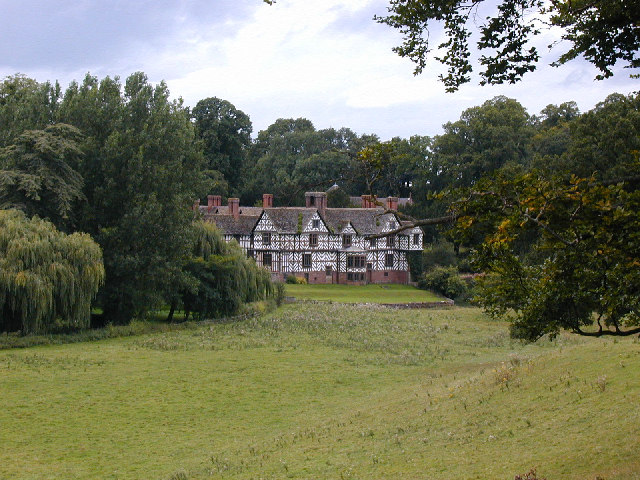
Pitchford Hall

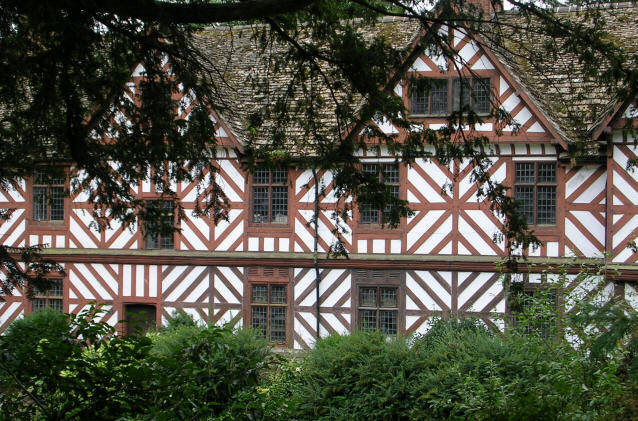
Façade

Pitchford Hall is a Grade I listed Tudor country house in the village of Pitchford, Shropshire, 6 miles south east of Shrewsbury.

It was built c.1560 on the site of a medieval building and has been modified several times since, particularly in the 1870s and 1880s when it was substantially restored, remodelled and extended. It is a timber-framed two-storey building with rendered red sandstone panels, a stone roof and brick chimneys. The floor plan is E-shaped round a courtyard to the south with a Victorian service wing to the west. There is also an orangery and walled garden on the grounds.

A deer park established in 1638 was disparked in 1790. 100 metres north of the hall is a bitumen well, near a ford across the Row Brook, from which the village gets its name. The bitumen or pitch was once used for waterproofing the timbers of the house. A 17th-century tree house in a large lime tree is one of the oldest in the world. A stretch of the Roman Watling Street runs through the estate.

The hall and its contents were sold at auction in 1992. The hall was repurchased in 2016 by the Colthurst family, who had retained the estate, and is under restoration after falling derelict.

== House ==
The house has 42 rooms and is a Tudor timber-framed building on a plinth of sandstone rubble, with rendered infill panels. It is on an E plan, with a main courtyard in the south and a service wing in the west. It was Grade I listed in January 1952. There is a priest hole.

Several outbuildings, walls, and garden features at Pitchford are also on the listed buildings register. The 17th-century tree house, one of the oldest in the world, was remodelled in Gothic style in the 18th century and was Grade II listed in April 1977.

St. Michael's Church, the parish church of Pitchford, is opposite the hall and also Grade I listed. It is open to the public and holds services once or twice a month.

== History ==
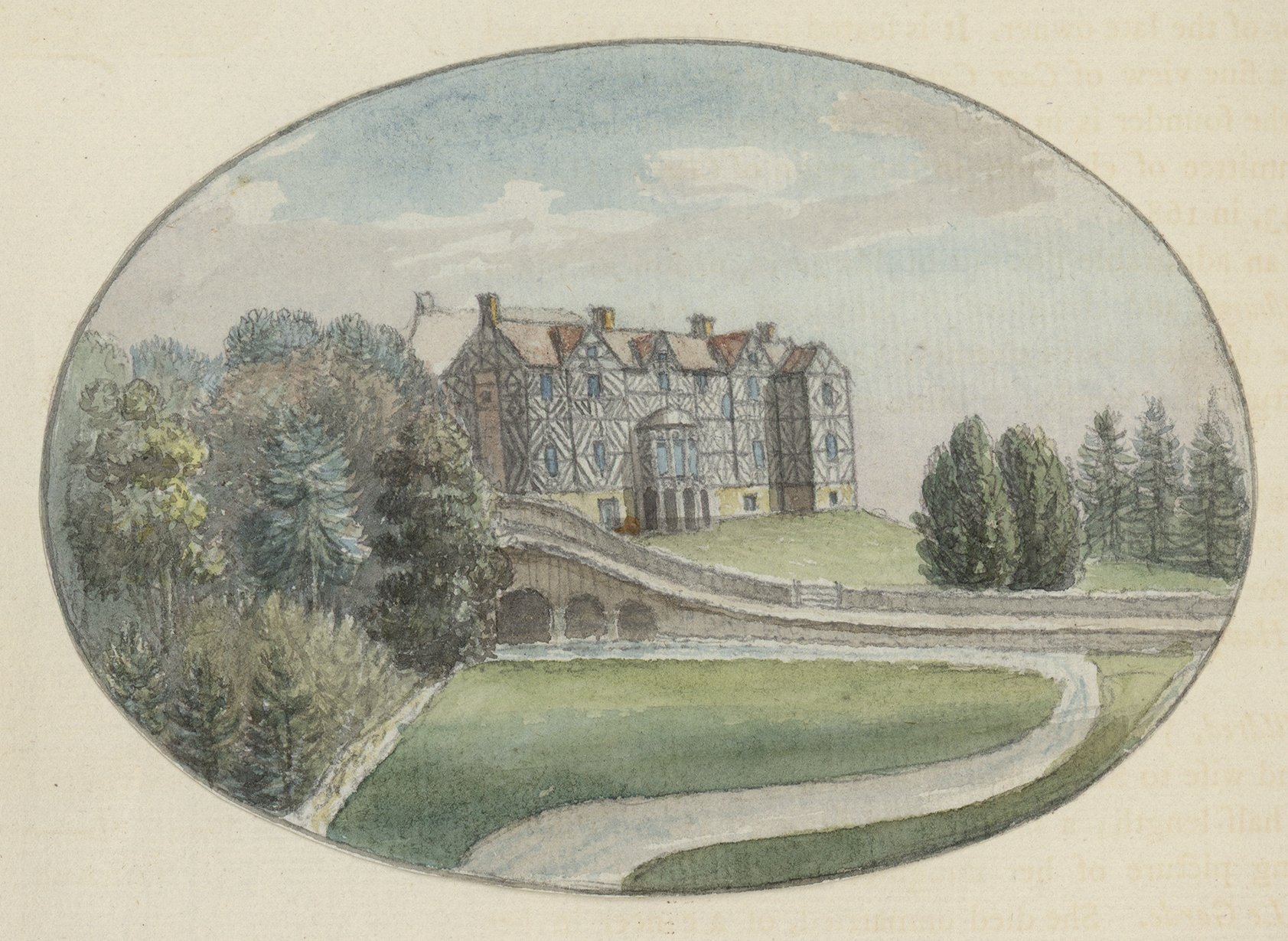
Pitchford Hall c.1778

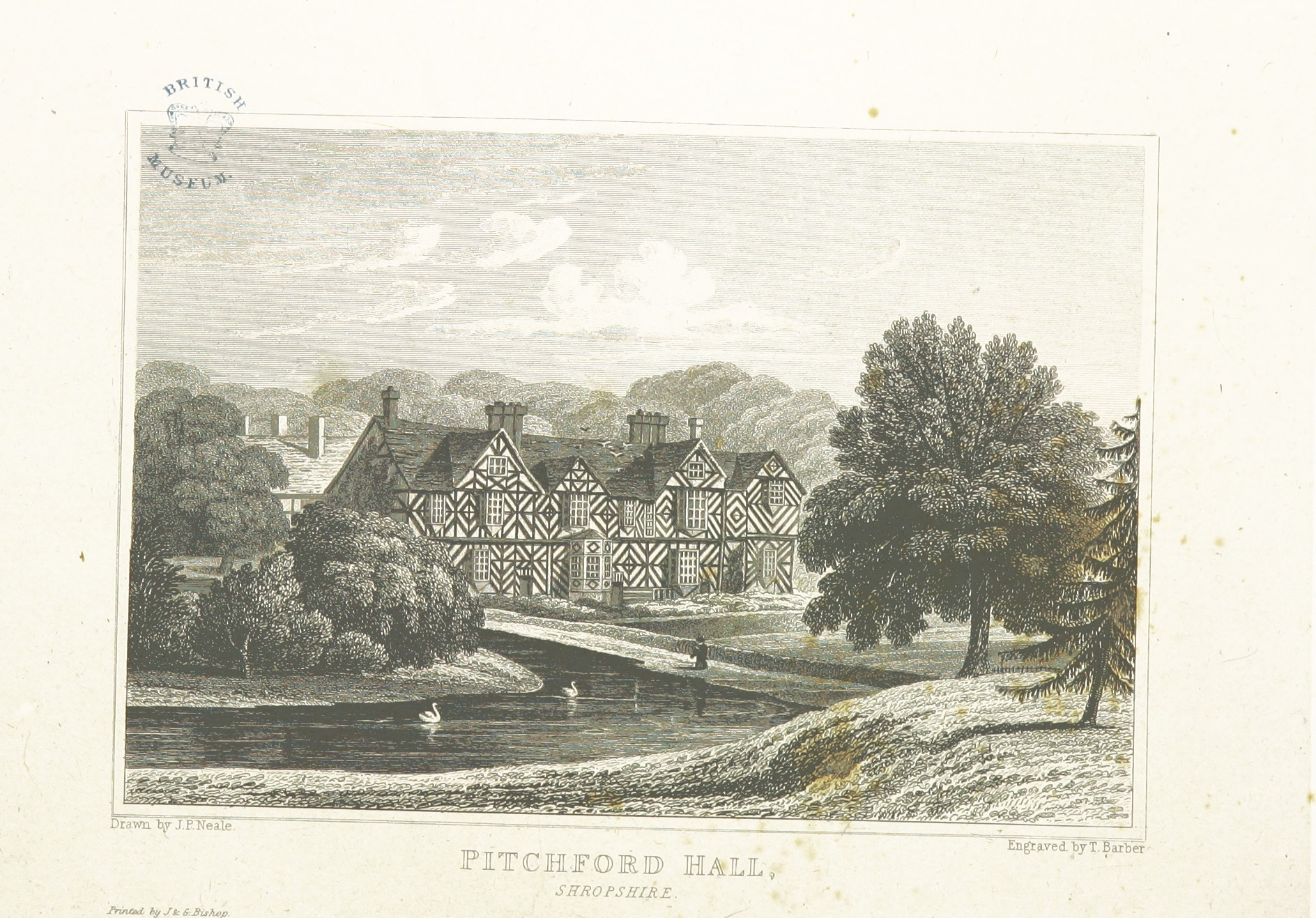
Pitchford Hall in 1825

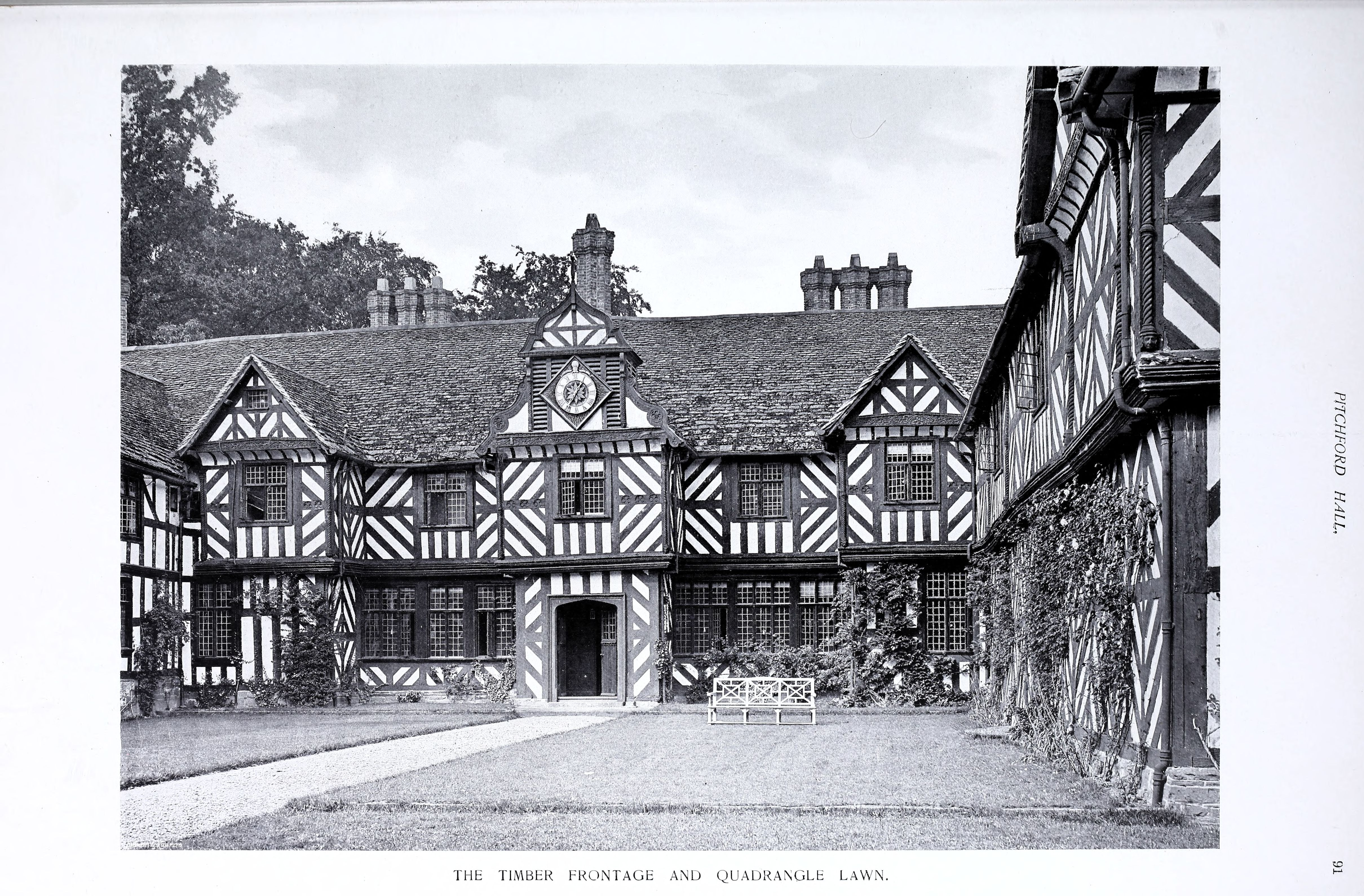
Quadrangle in 1900

There has been a manor house on the site since around 1284, the estate at the time being in the possession of the de Pykeford family. Geoffrey de Pykeford, a crusader, was lord of the manor from 1272 and built the local church of St Michael, which contains an oak effigy of Sir John who died in 1285. Eventually, however, the family had to sell the estate to the church in the 1330s in order to repay debts.

Thomas Ottley bought the Manor of Pitchford in 1473. The present house was built c.1560 for Adam Ottley, a Shrewsbury wool merchant, and possibly incorporated elements of the previous medieval structure. The estate remained in the Ottley family until the death of his descendant, another Adam Ottley in 1807. The hall and estate then passed to Hon. Charles C. C. Jenkinson, second son of the 1st Earl of Liverpool and later to his daughter Louisa and son-in-law John Cotes. In the last quarter of the 19th century, John's son Charles Cotes commissioned the London architect George Devey to renovate and upgrade the house, which included the removal of the south side of the courtyard and installation of replacement windows, baths and water closets. Charles died unmarried and the estate passed by 1918 to his brother-in-law Sir Charles Grant. His son Robin Grant bequeathed it in 1972 to his stepdaughter Caroline Colthurst, who was married to Oliver Colthurst, a younger son of Sir Richard Colthurst, 8th Baronet Colthurst.

During the Civil War, Prince Rupert, nephew of King Charles I, was concealed from the Roundheads in the priest hole at Pitchford Hall after the fall of Shrewsbury. The house was visited in 1832 by Princess (later Queen) Victoria, who watched a fox hunt from the treehouse, and in her diary described the hall as "A curious looking but very comfortable house. It is striped black and white, and in the shape of a cottage." The house formerly contained a sketch of a mounted guardsman that she made during her stay.

In 1935 the Duke and Duchess of York (later King George VI and Queen Elizabeth) visited the house. During the Second World War, Pitchford was one of the country retreats selected to house the royal family should they need to be evacuated from the capital in case of an invasion. Other stately homes in England were selected as backups, with Hatley Castle, on Vancouver Island in Canada as the final option in case German troops reached the Midlands. If that last resort option was required, the family was to travel to Holyhead for transport to Canada by the Royal Navy.

By the 20th century, the house was again in need of major renovations. The Colthursts began work under the guidance of English Heritage and Andrew Arrol. The house was opened to the public beginning in 1990.

In 1992, to satisfy obligations incurred by Oliver Colthurst as a member of Lloyd's of London with unlimited liability, the contents of the house were sold at auction and the house itself, which the National Trust had been unable to raise the money to purchase, was sold to a Kuwaiti princess. It was left vacant and fell into disrepair. As of 2005 English Heritage classified its condition as "fair", and it was placed on Historic England's Buildings at Risk Register. The Colthursts' younger daughter Rowena Colthurst and her husband James Nason repurchased it in 2016, and have committed to reopening it after a major restoration under a Section 106 planning agreement. The west wing had been renovated and made available for holiday rental by 2019. The orangery has been converted to an events space and the library restored in Tudor Gothic style, and the owners are attempting to repurchase furnishings and art sold in 1992.

The former Great Western Railway Hall class locomotive No 4953, built in 1929 and now running on the Epping Ongar Railway, was named Pitchford Hall.

== See also ==
- Grade I listed buildings in Shropshire
- Listed buildings in Pitchford
