= Ongar railway station =

Former London Underground station

Ongar
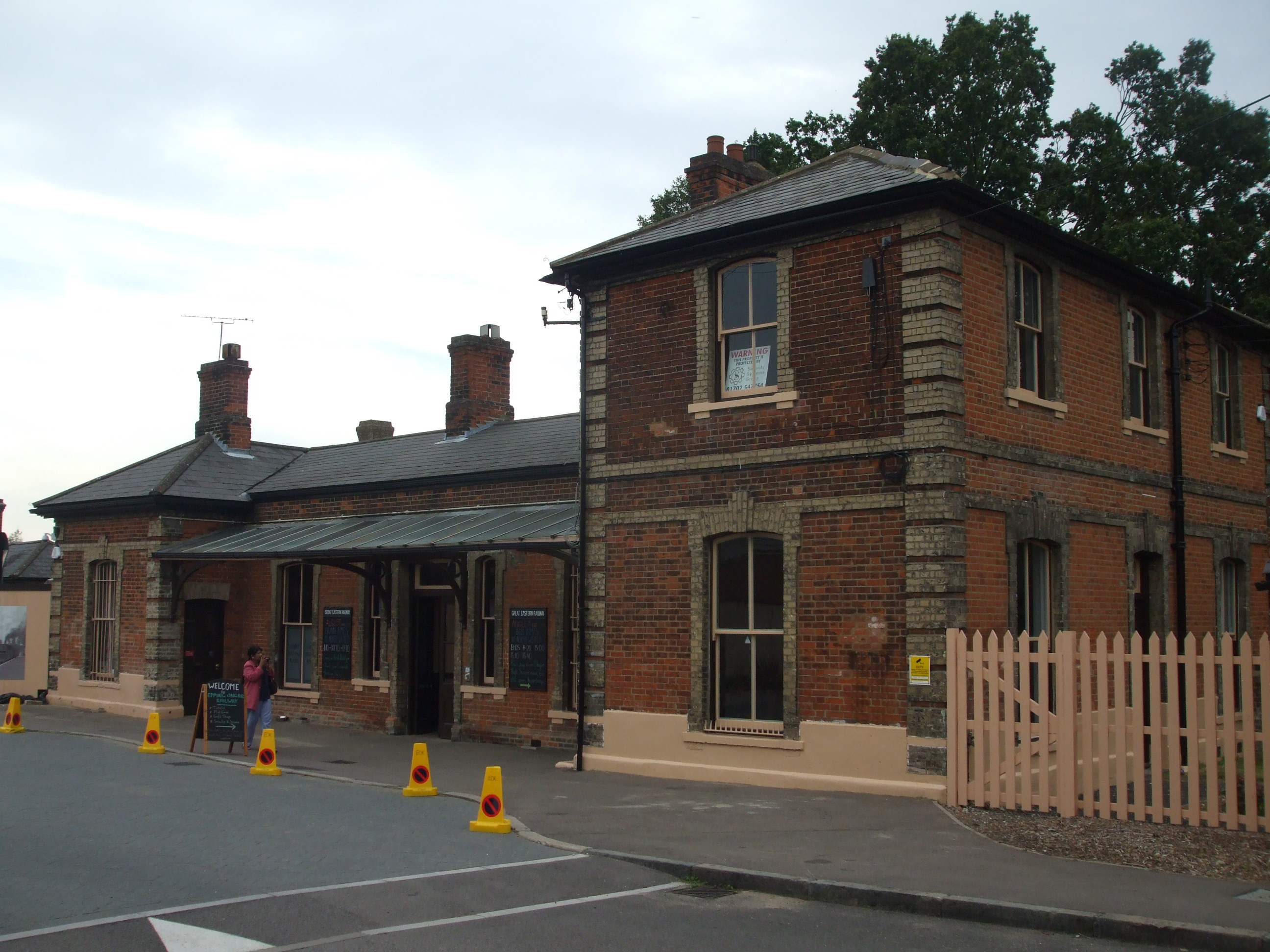
- Ongar station after re-opening in 2012

General information
- Location: Chipping Ongar, Epping Forest; England
- Coordinates: 51.70889°N 0.24278°E
- Grid reference: TL550034
- System: Station on heritage railway
- Operator: Epping Ongar Railway
- Platforms: 1

History
- Original company: Great Eastern Railway
- Pre-grouping: Great Eastern Railway
- Post-grouping: London and North Eastern Railway

Key dates
- 24 April 1865: Station opened
- 25 September 1949: Transferred to LT Central line
- 18 November 1957: Electrified
- 18 April 1966: Goods yard closed
- 30 September 1994: Station closed
- November 2004: Reopened in preservation by Epping Ongar Railway Volunteer Rail Society
- December 2007: Station closed
- 25 May 2012: Reopened by Epping Ongar Railway
Location

Ongar railway station is a station on the Epping Ongar Railway heritage line, and a former London Underground station in the town of Chipping Ongar, Essex. It was opened in 1865 by the Great Eastern Railway, and became part of London Transport in 1949. Until its closure as such in 1994, it was the easternmost point of the Central line and the eastern buffers remain the point from which all distances on the London Underground are measured.

== History ==
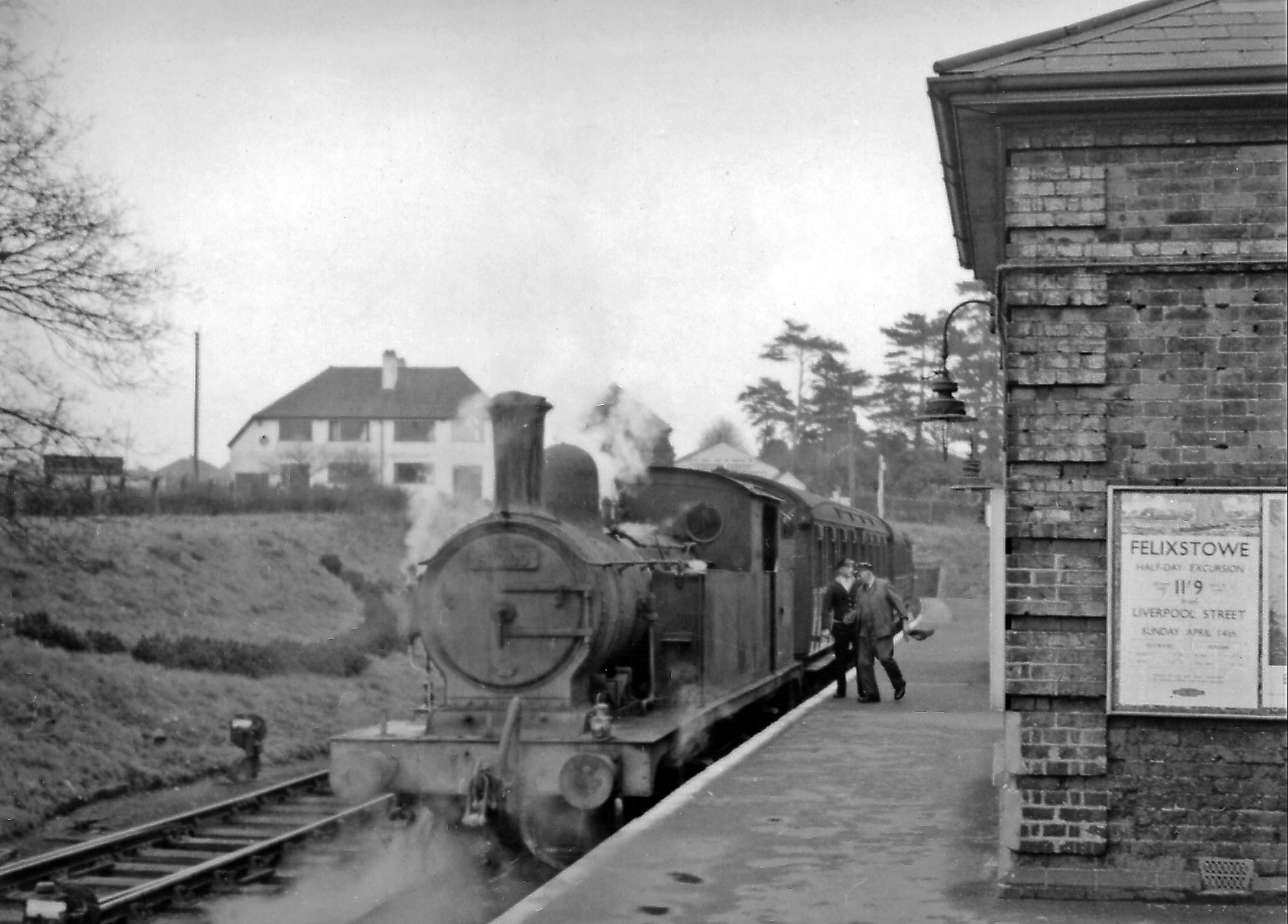
9 March 1957, Ongar station still served with steam traction

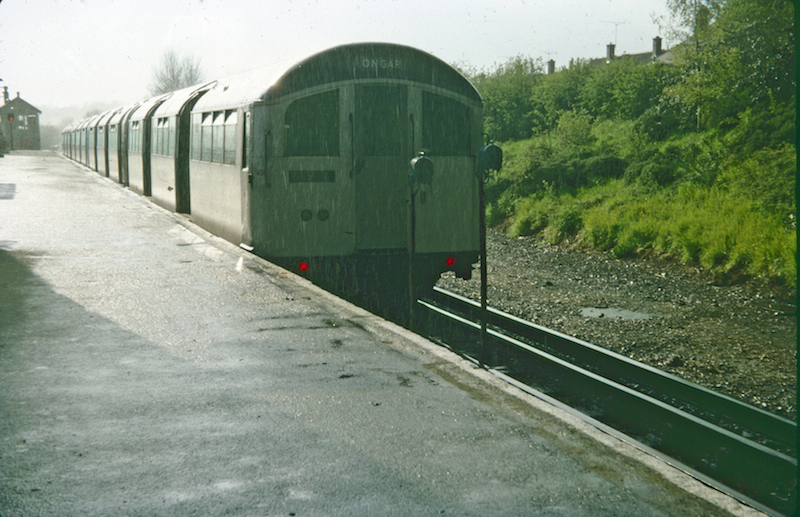
Ongar station in April 1977

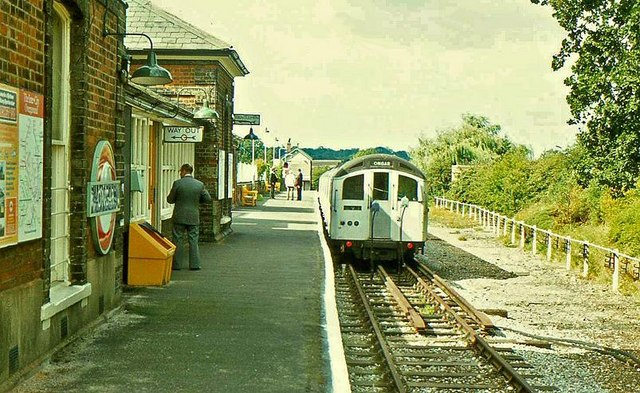
London Underground train calls at the station in 1980

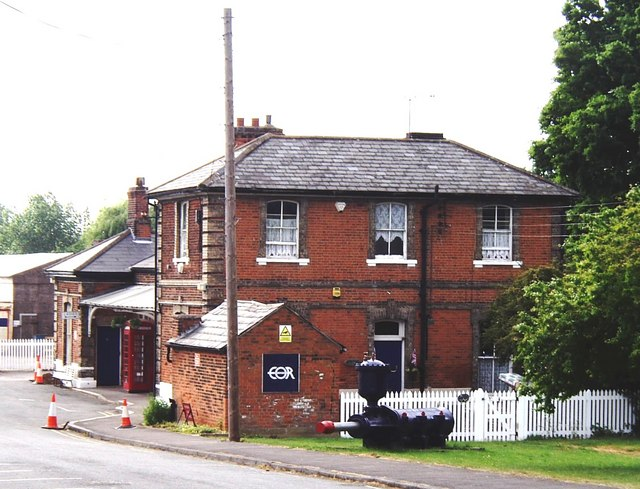
Ongar station, with the sign of the present operator, Epping Ongar Railway (EOR)

The station was opened by the Great Eastern Railway on 24 April 1865, serving principally as a goods station taking agricultural produce from the nearby farms into central London. On 25 September 1949, London Underground services took over the operation of the station from British Railways when services were extended from Loughton.

Although the rest of the branch was electrified by London Underground before operations were taken over from British Railways, trains on the section north of Epping continued to be hauled by steam locomotives as a separate shuttle service. The service was operated by British Railways for the Underground until 18 November 1957, when the line was electrified and electric trains took over from steam. The low power supply prevented the Epping to Ongar section being fully integrated into the line and it continued to operate as a shuttle service.

The entire Epping to Ongar branch was a single track line with one passing place at North Weald station, although this loop was taken out of service between 1888 and 1949, and again from 1976. Between 1949 and 1976 two Tube trains could use the branch, although they were limited to four cars in length because of the restriction on the available traction current, as well as by the restricted platform lengths at North Weald and Blake Hall. The service was reduced to one train after the southbound track at North Weald was lifted. It was therefore never suitable for heavy use, and the line was reportedly never profitable. For much of its latter years, the service only operated during Monday to Friday peak hours, and London Transport closed Blake Hall station, the least used on the entire system, in 1981. The line itself continued in use and there was a brief re-introduction of all day services in 1990. However, a system wide cost-cutting exercise saw the service return to peak hours soon afterwards, with an even more skeletal service than before. The line was under threat of closure for many years, and it was finally closed on 30 September 1994.

== Epping Ongar Railway ==
The station and the line are now in the ownership of a private company, Epping Ongar Railway Ltd who, at time of purchase, publicly stated their intention to run commuter services again, but the claimed lack of platform availability at London Underground's Epping station at the west end of the line has to date proven an insuperable obstacle to this. The Epping Ongar Railway Volunteer Rail Society ran heritage trains on Sundays over the former Epping and Ongar line from 2004 until 2007, when the line was closed following a change in ownership.

EOR totem

The line was reopened to the public on 25 May 2012.

Ongar Station, as with the rest of the 6.5-mile branch reaching to the outskirts of Epping station, is currently undergoing significant improvement and infrastructure works. These are designed with the long-term future of the branch and to enable the use of locomotive-hauled trains (hauled by steam and diesel locomotives), all in keeping with its use as a heritage railway. The station itself has been extensively restored by the teams of volunteers, with all the rooms being restored to their original layouts, opening up bricked up doorways and windows, and restoring the station to Great Eastern Railway colours (believed to be the only original operational GER station in its original colours). Within the station the former Parcels Office will be a museum and educational display.

In addition a GER signalbox, originally located at Spellbrook, has been rescued and rebuilt to replace the Ongar signalbox demolished by LU in the 1980s, and the platform is being improved to facilitate access.

Local bus services connecting Ongar railway station to Brentwood, Chelmsford, Epping and Harlow are provided by NIBS Buses, Central Connect and First Essex. The station is also occasionally served by heritage bus route 339, operated by the Epping Ongar Railway, which serves the Shenfield, Ongar and Epping stations using a fleet of preserved London Transport buses.

== Other information ==
The sand drag at the very end of the rails — intended to help slow trains that overshot the stopping mark — was said to be home to a breed of harmless scorpion and featured in a 1979 episode of the BBC's Wildlife on One. They had been released there by a station foreman who was a keeper of exotic pets. The sand drag has since been removed. A scorpion has since been sighted in the wild, ten miles north of Ongar, in April 2010, although this is thought to be unrelated.

In 1971–72 the London underground network was remeasured in kilometres using Ongar as its zero point.

The Royal Navy's Tigerfish torpedo was known as Project ONGAR during development.

There were various ill-fated attempts mainly by the Great Eastern Railway later the London and North Eastern Railway to extend beyond Ongar station in the past including to Great Dunmow, Bury St Edmunds via Great Dunmow and back on to the GER mainline at Chelmsford by way of Margaretting. There were also a few light railway schemes like the Hedingham & Long Melford Railway and others that proposed a route from Ongar to Yeldham at Great Yeldham via Great Dunmow, Haverhill and Shenfield.

== See also ==
- List of former and unopened London Underground stations

Preceding station	Heritage railways	Following station
North Weald towards Epping Forest	Epping Ongar Railway	Terminus
Historical railways
Preceding station	London Underground	Following station
Blake Hall towards Epping	Central line Epping-Ongar branch	Terminus
Blake Hall; Line open, station closed	Great Eastern Railway; Loughton-Ongar	Terminus
