= Epping tube station =

London Underground station

Epping
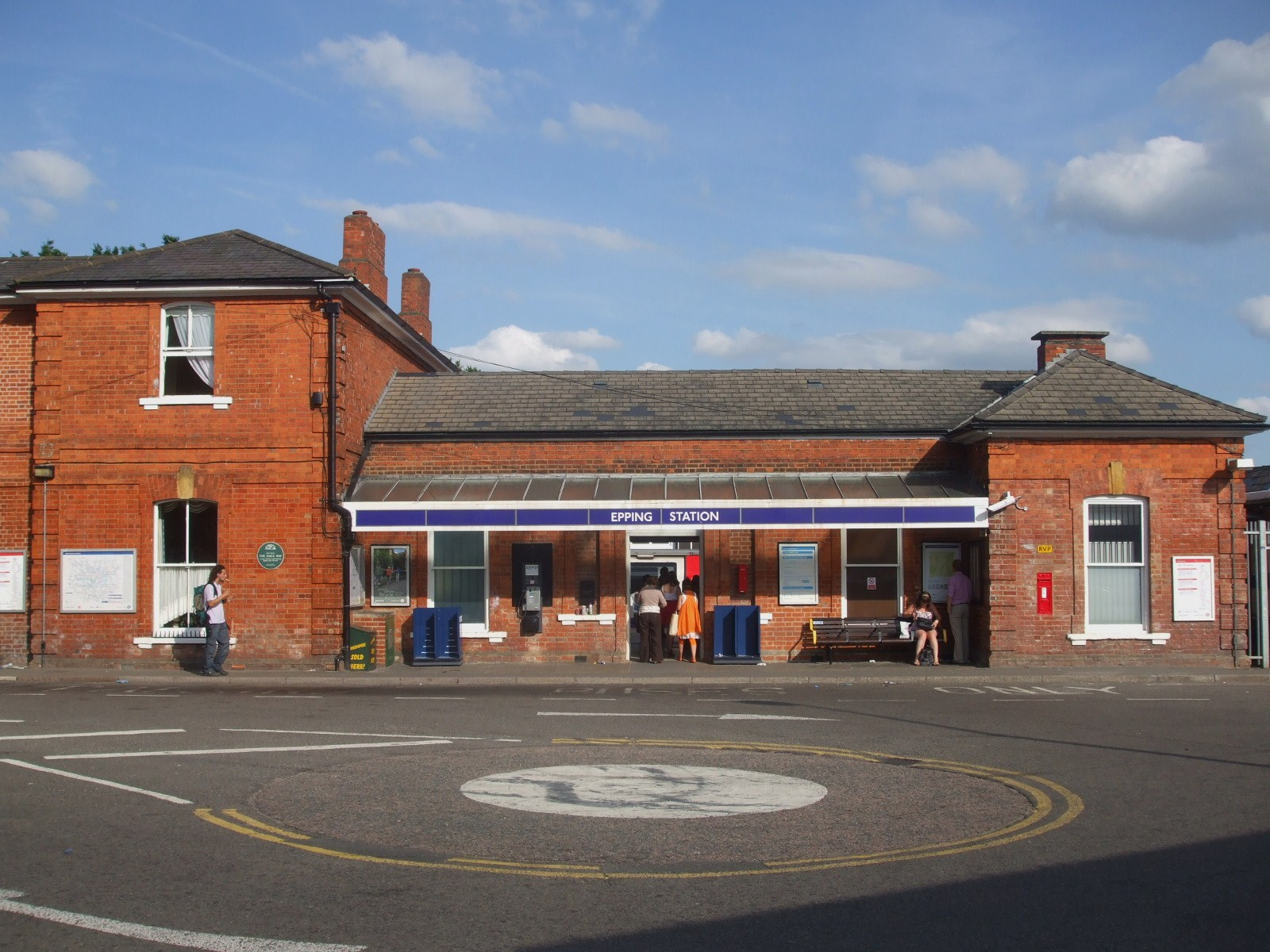
- Epping station
- Interactive map of Epping

General information
- Location: Epping
- Local authority: District of Epping Forest
- Grid reference: TL462015
- Managed by: London Underground
- Number of platforms: 2
- Accessible: Yes (Platform 1 is step free exit only but Platform 2 is fully accessible.)
- Fare zone: 6

London Underground annual entry and exit
- 2021: ▼1.89 million
- 2022: ▲3.02 million
- 2023: ▲3.28 million
- 2024: ▼3.26 million
- 2025: ▲3.28 million

Key dates
- 1865: Opened
- 1949: London Underground services start
- 18 April 1966: Goods yard closed
- 1994: Ongar services end

Other information
- External links: TfL station info page
- Coordinates: 51.6938°N 0.1137°E

Epping is a London Underground station in the suburban town of Epping in Essex, England. It is the north-eastern terminus of the Central line and the next station towards London is Theydon Bois. Situated in London fare zone 6, it is one of eight London Underground stations in the Epping Forest District.

== History ==
In 1856, the Eastern Counties Railway opened a double-track railway between Stratford and Loughton. In 1865, its successor, the Great Eastern Railway, added a single-track extension from Loughton to Ongar. The popularity of the line led to the doubling of the track between Loughton and Epping in 1892. The line was well served, with 50 trains operating between Liverpool Street and Loughton each day, a further 22 continuing to Epping and 14 more to Ongar.

Loughton to Epping became part of the London Underground Central line on 25 September 1949, leaving the single track line from Epping to Ongar as the last steam-worked section. British Railways continued running Ongar services until 1957 when the line was electrified and became part of the Central line. However, services did not run through to the rest of the Central line except for occasional depot workings, so passengers to/from stations beyond Epping normally had to change platforms for the single-track line to Ongar, North Weald or Blake Hall stations. On 2 November 1981, Blake Hall closed and trains passed through the station. On 30 September 1994 London Underground withdrew the service between Epping and Ongar and subsequently sold off that section of the Central line.

On 11 May 2008 an e-petition calling for the reopening of North Weald and Ongar stations was created on the Downing Street website. It closed on 11 December 2008 with 1012 signatures. Part of the Epping-Ongar line is now a heritage railway, the Epping Ongar Railway. Subject to finance and planning, the heritage railway propose to build a new station close to the tube station called Epping Forest as the heritage line cannot run in to the original station.

Epping Station was to be the terminus of the proposed London Underground Chelsea-Hackney line (Crossrail 2). However, since 2013, the route options for this proposed line have been amended to terminate at New Southgate instead and no longer include the Epping branch.

Epping station saw a growth in passenger numbers in the mid 1990s due to the closures of nearby North Weald, Blake Hall and Ongar stations. This growth has continued due to significant development in Epping itself and surrounding villages. Another major contributing factor is that many people living in not too distant towns such as Harlow, Bishop's Stortford, and Chelmsford use the station instead of their own National Rail stations, because it is considerably cheaper to travel to London by London Underground than it is to use National Rail services. Growth is now at such a point where the station's car park is full by 6:30 am on weekdays, and parking around the station (as with other stations on this part of the line, e.g. Theydon Bois and Debden) has become a serious problem for local residents, which in turn has caused many residents and local groups to call for the reopening of North Weald and Ongar stations to help ease demand on Epping station.

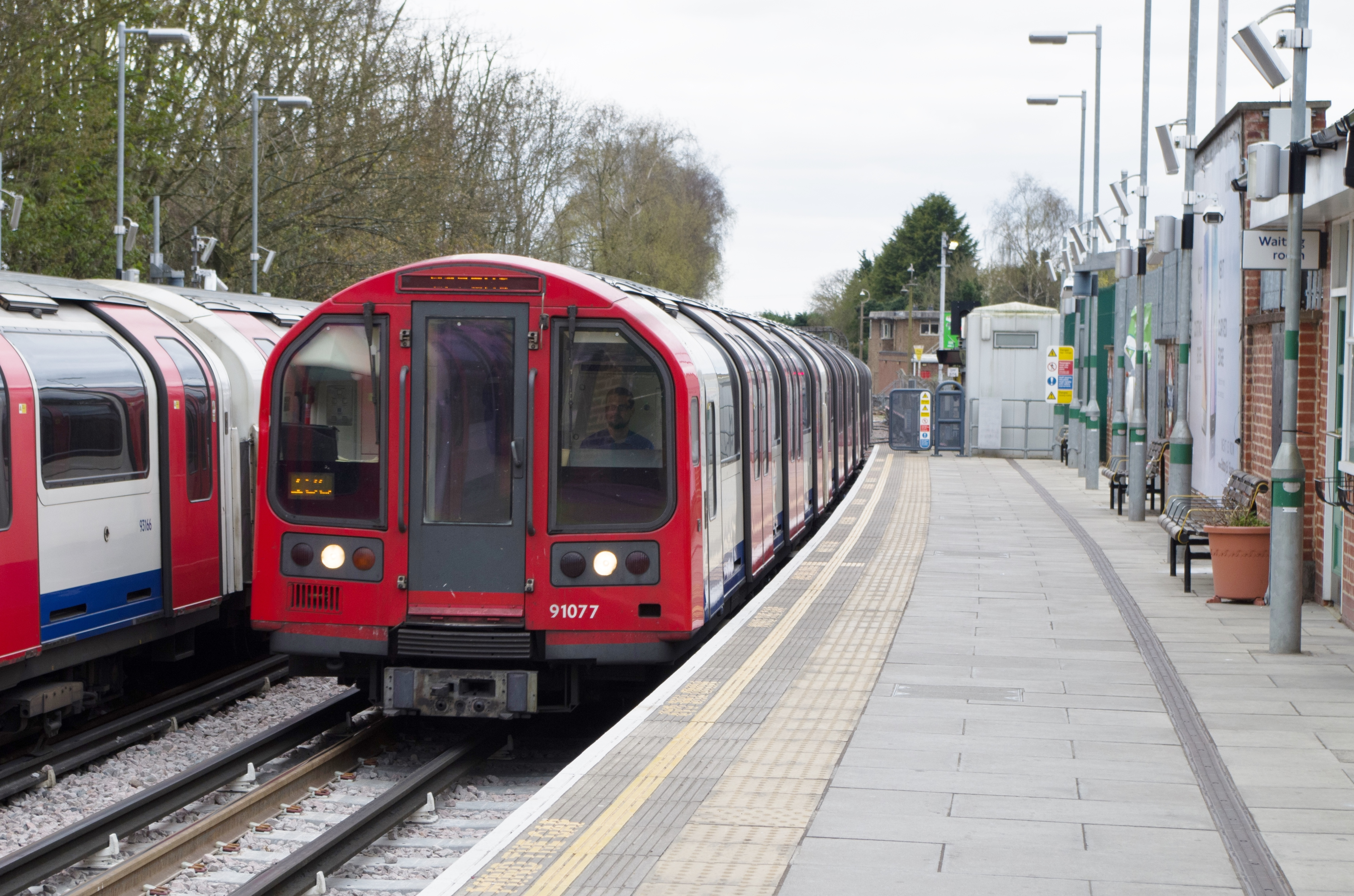
A Central line train arriving at the station

== Bibliography ==
- Follenfant, H G (1974). Reconstructing London's Underground. London Transport Executive. ISBN 978-0-85329-039-1.
- Green, Oliver (1987). The London Underground An Illustrated History. Ian Allan. ISBN 978-0-7110-1720-7.

Preceding station	London Underground	Following station
Theydon Bois towards Ealing Broadway or West Ruislip	Central line	Terminus
Historical railways
Theydon Bois; Line and station open	Great Eastern Railway; Loughton-Ongar	North Weald; Line closed, station open
Preceding station	London Underground	Following station
Terminus	Central line Epping-Ongar branch	North Weald towards Ongar
Heritage railways
Epping Ongar Railway stops at Epping Forest (about 100 metres from the station), but passengers cannot alight.
