= Pitchford =

Village in Shropshire, England

Coordinates: 52.628°N 2.695°W

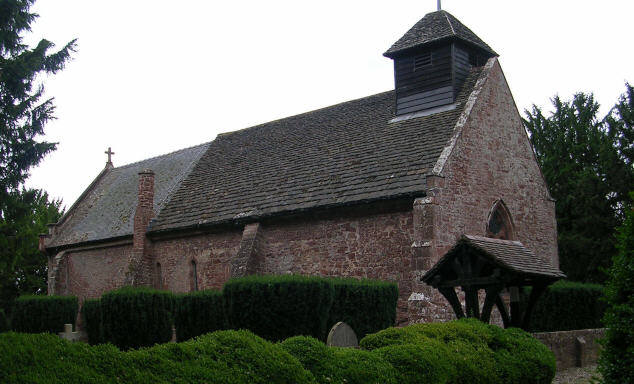
- St Michael and All Angels' Church

- Location within Shropshire
- Population: 110
- OS grid reference: SJ529036
- Civil parish: Pitchford
- Unitary authority: Shropshire
- Ceremonial county: Shropshire
- Region: West Midlands
- Country: England
- Sovereign state: United Kingdom
- Post town: Shrewsbury
- Postcode district: SY5
- Police: West Mercia
- Fire: Shropshire
- Ambulance: West Midlands
- UK Parliament: Shrewsbury and Atcham

Pitchford is a small village in the English county of Shropshire. It is located between Cantlop and Acton Burnell and stands on an affluent of the River Severn. Pitchford takes its name from a bituminous spring/pitch in the village, located near the Row Brook.

It is home to Pitchford Hall, one of the most notable Elizabethan houses in Britain. The Church of St Michael and All Angels stands near to the house which contains a carved oak 13th century effigy of Sir John de Pitchford. It is also the name for the civil parish.

== History ==
=== Population ===
Census data during the years 1881– 1961 shows that Pitchford's population decreased while the total population of England and Wales increased conversely. Housing information recorded through the years of 1831–1961 shows the number of houses in the area fluctuated between 35 and 43 houses during this time. Statistics from the 2001 census show that the number of households with residents was 44. In 2001, its total population was 110.

The population's social class was examined 1831 census, with the majority (over 55%) of the population described as "Labourers and Servants". The second largest social class was recorded as "muddling sorts".

=== Employment ===
In the Census of 1831 a detailed categorisation of employment was recorded, showing that Agricultural Labourers made up the largest sector (over 50%) of employment of Males aged 20 and over in 9 occupational categories. The second largest category consisted of those employed in the Retail and Handicrafts industry. Of the 76 Pitchford population aged between 16 and 74, 59 people were economically active/ employed whereas none were unemployed. The majority (39 people) of these were employed in Service Industries.

== Pitchford Estate ==
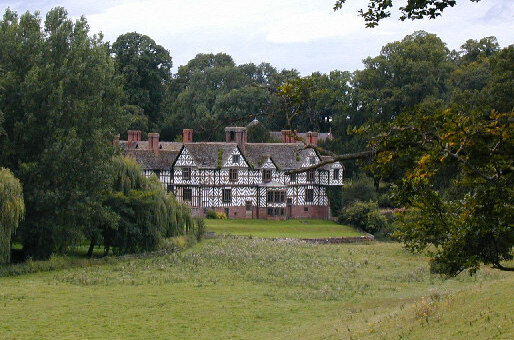
Pitchford Hall

Pitchford Hall is Grade I listed building, and the estate is first referred to in historical records in the Domesday Book of 1086 as follows: "Edric, and Leofric and Wulfric held it as three manors; they were free. 3 hides which pay tax. Land for 5 ploughs. In lordship 3; 3 slaves; 3 ploughmen; 1 village; 3 smallholders, a smith and rider with 2 ploughs. Woodland for fattening 100 pigs. Value before 1066, 8s later 16s; now 40s". Records suggest a medieval manor house existed somewhere on the site from at least 1284 to 1431.

The 40-room mansion as it exists today however is said to have been built between 1560 and 1570 for Adam Ottley, a wool merchant from Shrewsbury. The half-timbered mansion stands next to the Church of St Michael and All Angels, and is widely considered to be one of the finest Tudor houses in Britain. The Pitchford estate remained in the Ottley family until the death of Adam Ottley in 1807, when it passed to Hon. Charles C. C. Jenkinson, second son of the 1st Earl of Liverpool and later to his son-in-law John Cotes.

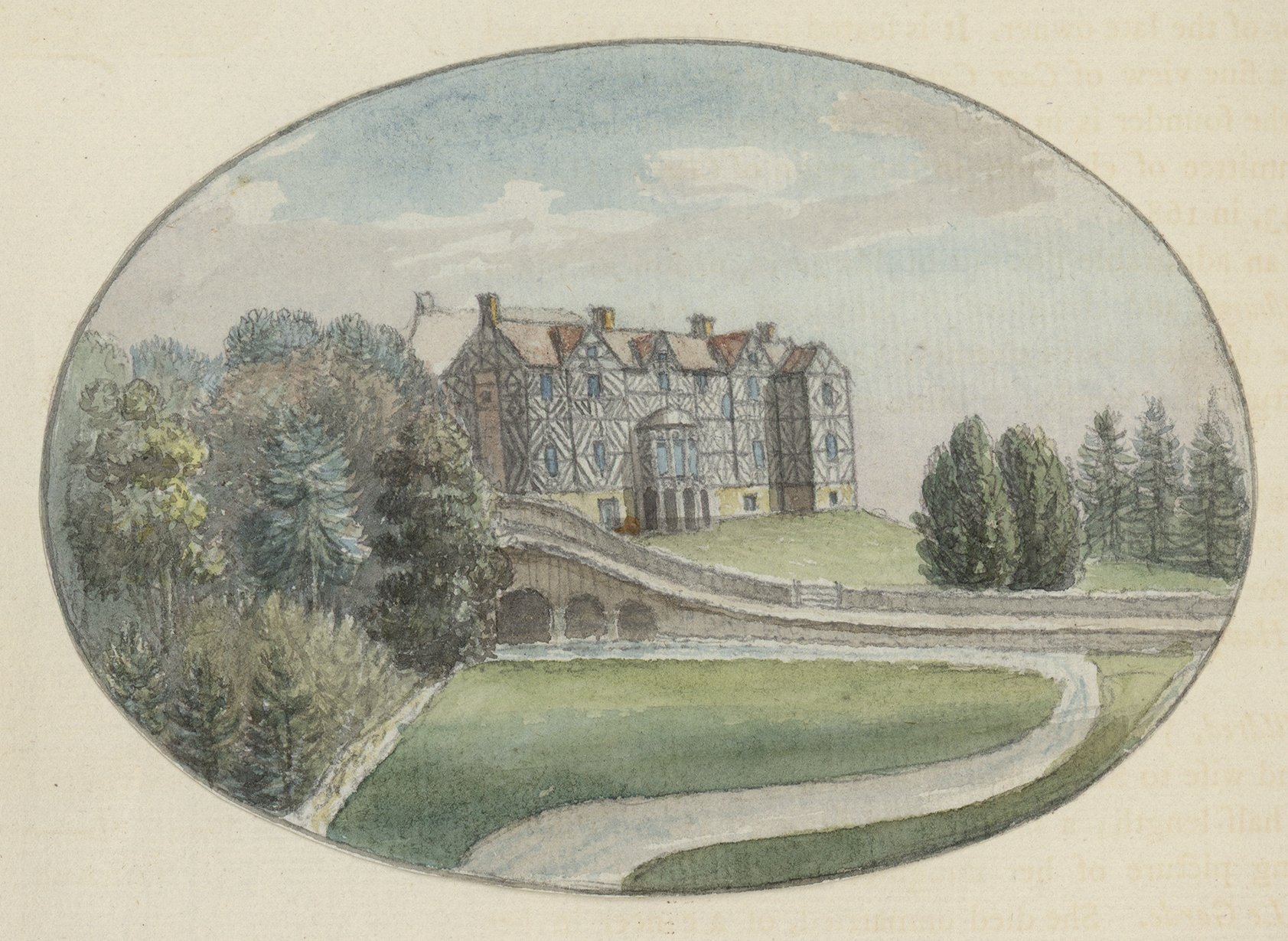
Pitchford Hall c.1778

Princess Victoria visited the hall in 1832, five years before acceding to the throne, and wrote in her diary that the hall was "A curious looking but very comfortable house. It is striped black and white, and in the shape of a cottage". George VI (The Duke of York at the time) and Duchess of York (The Queen Mother post-1952) also stayed in the hall during 1935. In 1940, during the Second World War, Pitchford Hall was one of the three houses selected for the King and Queen as a potential safe refuge away from London. The hall, unlike some similar properties in Britain has remained in private ownership for many generations. The hall was sold in 1993 however, ending a 500-year family link to the estate. The Pitchford Hall and estate were separately owned until 2016, when Rowena Colthurst and her husband James Nason purchased the Hall back into family ownership.

=== St Michael's Church ===
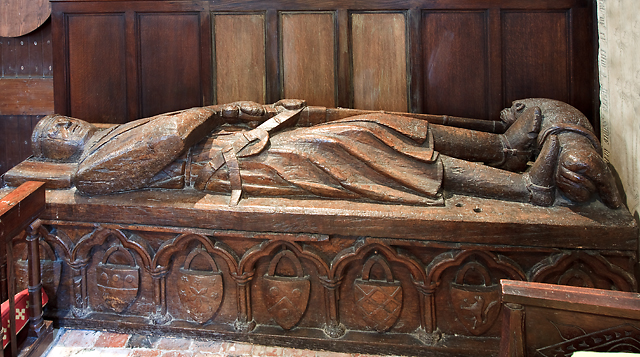
The carved oak tomb of Sir John de Pitchford, (d. 1285)

The Grade A listed Church of St Michael and All Angels was founded and built by Ralph de Pitchford in 1220 AD; the estate's website describes the church as Norman. The church was remodelled in the 13th century, the east wall of the chancel was rebuilt in 1719, the vestry was added in 1819, and the church was restored in 1910. The church consists of a nave and chancel in one cell, and a northeast vestry. It is built in red sandstone, the roof of the nave is in stone-slate, and the chancel has a tile roof. At the west end is a weatherboarded bellcote with a pyramidal stone cap and a finial (a decorative ending). Its pulpit and pews are in the early 17th-century Jacobean style.

The church contains war memorial plaques, listing two men who died in World War I and three in World War II, as well as nine men and six women of the parish who served in the latter war. The church's best known feature is a carved effigy and tomb chest of John De Pitchford (d. 1285), whose monument is positioned in the chancel of the church, and is made from solid oak.

== See also ==
- Listed buildings in Pitchford

== Sources ==
- Fryer, Alfred Cooper. Wooden Monumental Effigies in England And Wales. London: Archaeologia or Miscellaneous Tracts relating to Antiquity, 1909, republished 1924
- Historic England, "Church of St Michael, Pitchford (1177813)", National Heritage List for England
- Newman, John; Pevsner, Nikolaus (2006), Shropshire, The Buildings of England, New Haven and London: Yale University Press, ISBN 0-300-12083-4
- Tummers, H.A. Early Secular Effigies in England: The Thirteenth Century. Leiden: Brill Archive, 1980. ISBN 978-9-0040-6255-9
