= Listed buildings in Pitchford =

Pitchford is a civil parish in Shropshire, England. It contains 32 listed buildings that are recorded in the National Heritage List for England. Of these, two are listed at Grade I, the highest of the three grades, and the others are at Grade II, the lowest grade. The parish contains the village of Pitchford and the surrounding area. The largest building is Pitchford Hall, which is listed at Grade I. Most of the listed buildings in the parish are structures of various types associated with the hall. The oldest listed building is St Michael's Church, also listed at Grade I. The other listed buildings include houses, farmhouses, the possible base of a churchyard cross, a memorial in the churchyard, a bridge, and two milestones.

== Key ==
| Grade | Criteria |
|---|---|
| I | Buildings of exceptional interest, sometimes considered to be internationally important |
| II | Buildings of national importance and special interest |

== Buildings ==
| Name and location | Photograph | Date | Notes | Grade |
|---|---|---|---|---|
| St Michael's Church; 52.63427°N 2.69952°W | | Early 12th century | The church was remodelled in the 13th century, the east wall of the chancel was rebuilt in 1719, the vestry was added in 1819, and the church was restored in 1910. It is built in red sandstone, the roof of the nave is in stone-slate, and the chancel has a tile roof. The church consists of a nave and chancel in one cell, and a northeast vestry. At the west end is a weatherboarded bellcote with a pyramidal stone cap and a finial. | I |
| The Buttercross; 52.63075°N 2.69659°W | — | 15th or 16th century (possible) | This is in grey sandstone, and consists of a boulder on three circular stone steps. It possibly originated as the base of a churchyard cross, with the boulder added later. | II |
| Pitchford Hall; 52.63383°N 2.69921°W | | c. 1560–70 | A country house probably with an earlier core, it has since been altered and extended, particularly in the 1870s and 1880s. The house is timber framed with rendered infill on a red sandstone plinth, and has a stone-slate roof. There are two storeys and an attic, with a basement to the east, and an E-shaped plan. The upper floors are jettied with moulded bressumers. The windows are mullioned and transomed, and there is a bellcote containing a clock. On the north front, and approached by eight steps, is a two-storey porch with an ogee-arched doorway and an oriel window above. | I |
| Top Farmhouse; 52.62921°N 2.69560°W | — | Mid to late 16th century | The farmhouse was altered and extended in the 19th century. It is timber framed with rendered infill in wattle and daub and red brick, the extension is in red sandstone and red brick, and the roof is tiled. The original part has one storey and the extension has two storeys. There is an L-shaped plan, with a front range of three bays, and two gabled rear wings. On the front is a gabled porch, the windows are casements, and there are three gabled eaves dormers. | II |
| Tree House, Pitchford Hall; 52.63275°N 2.69991°W | — | Early 17th century (probable) | The tree house is a folly built in a lime tree, and remodelled in the 18th century in Gothic style. It is timber framed with rendered infill, corner posts with shaped pendants, a pyramidal tile roof and a finial. The doorway and casement windows have ogee heads, there is a wooden staircase leading up to the doorway, and the structure is supported on props. | II |
| Pitchford Farmhouse; 52.62930°N 2.69608°W | — | Mid 17th century | The farmhouse was remodelled and extended in the 19th century. It is timber framed, partly refaced and rebuilt in red sandstone and brick, it is extended in red sandstone, and there is a tile roof. Part of the farmhouse has two storeys, and the rest has one storey and an attic. There is a T-shaped plan, consisting of a two-bay range, a cross-wing, and a rear lean-to, and in the angle is a porch. The windows in the earlier part are casements, and in the extension they are sashes. At the rear of the main range is a gabled eaves dormer, and at the rear of the cross-wing is exposed timber framing. | II |
| 27 Pitchford; 52.63038°N 2.69433°W | — | Mid to late 17th century | A timber framed house with brick infill, some weatherboarding and rendering, and a tile roof. There is one storey and an attic, and a T-shaped plan, consisting of a front range of two or three bays, and a rear wing. On the front are three large brick buttresses. Most of the windows are casements, there is one horizontally-sliding sash window and a gabled eaves dormer. | II |
| Sundial (south), Pitchford Hall; 52.63351°N 2.69917°W | — | Early to mid 18th century | The sundial in the garden of the hall has a circular base in red sandstone, and a grey sandstone baluster stem with a moulded base and a concave top. On the top is a circular copper dial plate and a gnomon. | II |
| Orangery, walls, gates and gate piers, Pitchford Hall; 52.63275°N 2.69954°W | — | Mid to late 18th century | The walls are in red brick with red sandstone dressings, they are about 4 metres (13 ft) high, and form an irregular rectangular plan. There is an entrance to the east that has gate piers with pyramidal caps and wrought iron gates. The orangery is in painted timber framing, and has a hipped stone-slate roof with gablets. It has one storey, and fronts of eleven and four bays. | II |
| Pitchford Park Farmhouse; 52.63323°N 2.71212°W | — | c. 1774 | The farmhouse is in red brick with a dentil eaves cornice, and a slate roof with parapeted gable ends. There are two storeys, an attic and a basement, a main block of three bays, and a service wing to the left with one storey and an attic. Most of the windows are sashes, there is a French window at the rear, and gabled eaves dormers in the main block in the wing. | II |
| Former coach house, Pitchford Park Farm; 52.63331°N 2.71196°W | — | c. 1774 | The coach house, later used for other purposes, is in red brick with dressings in red sandstone, a dentil eaves cornice, and a tile roof. There is one storey with a loft. The south gable end has a blind round arch with stone impost bands and a keystone under a pedimented coped gable. Elsewhere there are doorways, a loft door, and windows, all with segmental heads, and to the east is a gabled eaves dormer. | II |
| Milestone at SJ 5296 0281; 52.62125°N 2.69621°W | — | Late 18th century | The milestone, on the west side of the Pitchford to Acton Burnell road, is in grey sandstone. It has a segmental top and is inscribed with the distance in miles to "SALOP" (Shrewsbury). | II |
| Milestone near North Lodge; 52.63724°N 2.69767°W | | Late 18th century | The milestone, on the south side of the Shrewsbury to Acton Burnell road, is in grey sandstone. It has a segmental top and is inscribed with the distance in miles to "SALOP" (Shrewsbury). | II |
| Plunge bath, Pitchford Hall; 52.63112°N 2.69647°W | — | Late 18th century | The bath is in stone, and is a square pool with sides of about 4 metres (13 ft). There is an internal step on three sides, on the east side is a semicircular recess, and on the west side is a drainage channel into Row Brook. | II |
| Stable block, Pitchford Hall; 52.63369°N 2.70031°W | — | Late 18th century | The stable block incorporates a dovecote and two cottages. It is in red brick with sandstone dressings and tile roofs, and forms a U-shaped plan with three ranges around a courtyard. There are two storeys, and a Tudor arched entrance with a clock. The coach house has a central tower, and the dovecote has a pyramidal roof and an octagonal cupola with an ogee lead dome. | II |
| Sundial (southeast), Pitchford Hall; 52.63317°N 2.69907°W | — | Late 18th or early 19th century | The sundial is in the garden of the hall. It is in grey sandstone, and has a stepped square base, a rectangular stem with a recessed rectangular panel in each face, and a moulded top. On the top are a copper dial plate and a gnomon. | II |
| The Old Rectory; 52.62994°N 2.69558°W | — | c. 1803 | The rectory, later a private house, is in rendered sandstone, and has a hipped tile roof. There are two storeys and a U-shaped plan. The north front has four bays, and contains paired doors with panelled pilasters, side lights, and a segmental-headed fanlight, and two flat-roofed canted bay windows. Most of the windows are sashes, and most have segmental heads. | II |
| Snanton Memorial; 52.63423°N 2.69956°W | — | Early 19th century | The memorial is in the churchyard of St Michael's Church, and is to the memory of John Snanton. It is a chest tomb in grey sandstone, and has a moulded plinth, raised and fielded side panels with flanking reeded pilaster strips, raised and fielded end panels, and a moulded cornice to a chamfered top. | II |
| Garden wall, The Old Rectory; 52.63014°N 2.69555°W | — | Early 19th century | The garden wall, which extends from the north of the house, is in red sandstone. It has an L-shaped plan with rounded corners, and is about 60 metres (200 ft) long and 3 metres (9.8 ft) high. The wall contains pilaster buttresses, two larger buttresses at the northeast end, and towards the south end is a doorway. | II |
| The Old Dairy; 52.63337°N 2.70157°W | — | Early 19th century | A farmhouse in red brick on a chamfered plinth, with sandstone dressings, a frieze, and a hipped tile roof. There are two storeys, a front of three bays, and sash windows. In the centre is a doorway with panelled pilasters, a rectangular fanlight, and a triangular pediment. At the rear is a doorway that has pilasters with fluted capitals, a frieze and a triangular pediment. | II |
| Pitchford Bridge; 52.63654°N 2.69430°W | — | c. 1833 | The bridge carries the Shrewsbury to Pichford road over Row Brook. It is in red sandstone, and consists of a single round arch with voussoirs. On each side of the arch are curved retaining walls, and there are low retaining walls on the banks of the brook. | II |
| North Lodge; 52.63740°N 2.69884°W | — | c. 1848 | The lodge, designed by Edward Haycock in Tudor Revival style, is in red sandstone on a plinth, and has a hipped tile roof. There is one storey, a square plan, and fronts of three bays. The middle bays of the east and north fronts project and have parapeted gables with truncated finials. The east front contains a porch and a Tudor arched doorway, and in the north front is a three-light window. The other windows have two lights, and all lights have pointed arches and chamfered surrounds. | II |
| South Lodge; 52.63144°N 2.69576°W | | c. 1848 | The lodge, designed by Edward Haycock in Tudor Revival style, is in red sandstone on a plinth, and has a hipped tile roof. There is one storey, a square plan, and fronts of three bays. The middle bays of the west and south fronts project and have parapeted gables with truncated finials. The west front contains a porch and a Tudor arched doorway, and in the south front is a three-light window. The other windows have two lights, and all lights have pointed arches and chamfered surrounds. | II |
| Estate bridge, Pitchford Hall; 52.63411°N 2.69792°W | — | 1870s | The bridge is in sandstone, and consists of two chamfered segmental arches with a parapet. The abutments have angled retaining walls, and at the southern end is a wooden gate. | II |
| Flight of steps (west), Pitchford Hall; 52.63317°N 2.69896°W | — | 1870s | The flight of steps is in the garden to the south of the hall. It consists of three red sandstone steps with low coped flanking walls and end piers with globe finials. | II |
| Flight of steps (east), Pitchford Hall; 52.63318°N 2.69884°W | — | 1870s | The flight of steps is in the garden to the south of the hall. It consists of three red sandstone steps with low coped flanking walls and end piers with globe finials. | II |
| Forecourt retaining wall, Pitchford Hall; 52.63407°N 2.69880°W | — | 1870s | The wall is to the east of the forecourt, and is in sandstone. It forms a wide concave curve, then turns to the south, and is about 32 metres (105 ft) long and between 3 metres (9.8 ft) and 4 metres (13 ft) high. It contains seven buttresses with chamfered tops and a square pier at the north end. | II |
| Garden retaining wall and steps, Pitchford Hall; 52.63321°N 2.69916°W | — | 1870s | The wall is in red sandstone with stone coping, and is about 34 metres (112 ft) long and between 1 metre (3 ft 3 in) and 2 metres (6 ft 7 in) high. At the southwest is a flight of eight stone steps and piers with globe finials. | II |
| Garden retaining wall and summerhouse, Pitchford Hall; 52.63353°N 2.69968°W | — | 1870s | The wall encloses the lawn to the south of the hall. It is in sandstone with stone coping, it has an L-shaped plan, and is about 100 metres (330 ft) long and 2.5 metres (8 ft 2 in) high. The wall contains a circular summer house is the southwest corner. This is in stone and has an open front of three bays with wooden columns, and a conical stone-slate roof with a finial. In the west wall is a doorway with a depressed arch. | II |
| Service forecourt retaining wall and outbuildings, Pitchford Hall; 52.63365°N 2.69955°W | — | 1870s | The wall runs on the south and west sides of the forecourt. It is in sandstone with a red brick parapet and sandstone coping; it is about 45 metres (148 ft) long and 4 metres (13 ft) high. In the southwest corner is a sandstone outbuilding with a lean-to loggia, and in the southeast corner are kennels in rendered brick that have an open front with sandstone columns. | II |
| Terrace retaining wall, Pitchford Hall; 52.63365°N 2.69864°W | — | 1870s | The terrace wall retains the west bank of Roe Brook to the east of the garden. It is in sandstone with stone coping, it is irregularly curved, and is about 60 metres (200 ft) long and of varying height. At the south end are piers with globe finials. | II |
| Cold bath, Pitchford Hall; 52.63069°N 2.69681°W | — | c. 1900 | The bath consists of an oval pool about 10 metres (33 ft) long, 7 metres (23 ft) long, and 1.5 metres (4 ft 11 in) deep. It is lined with brick, it has a raised kerb, and on one long side are stone steps and a platform. | II |
