= North Weald railway station =

Former railway station in England

North Weald
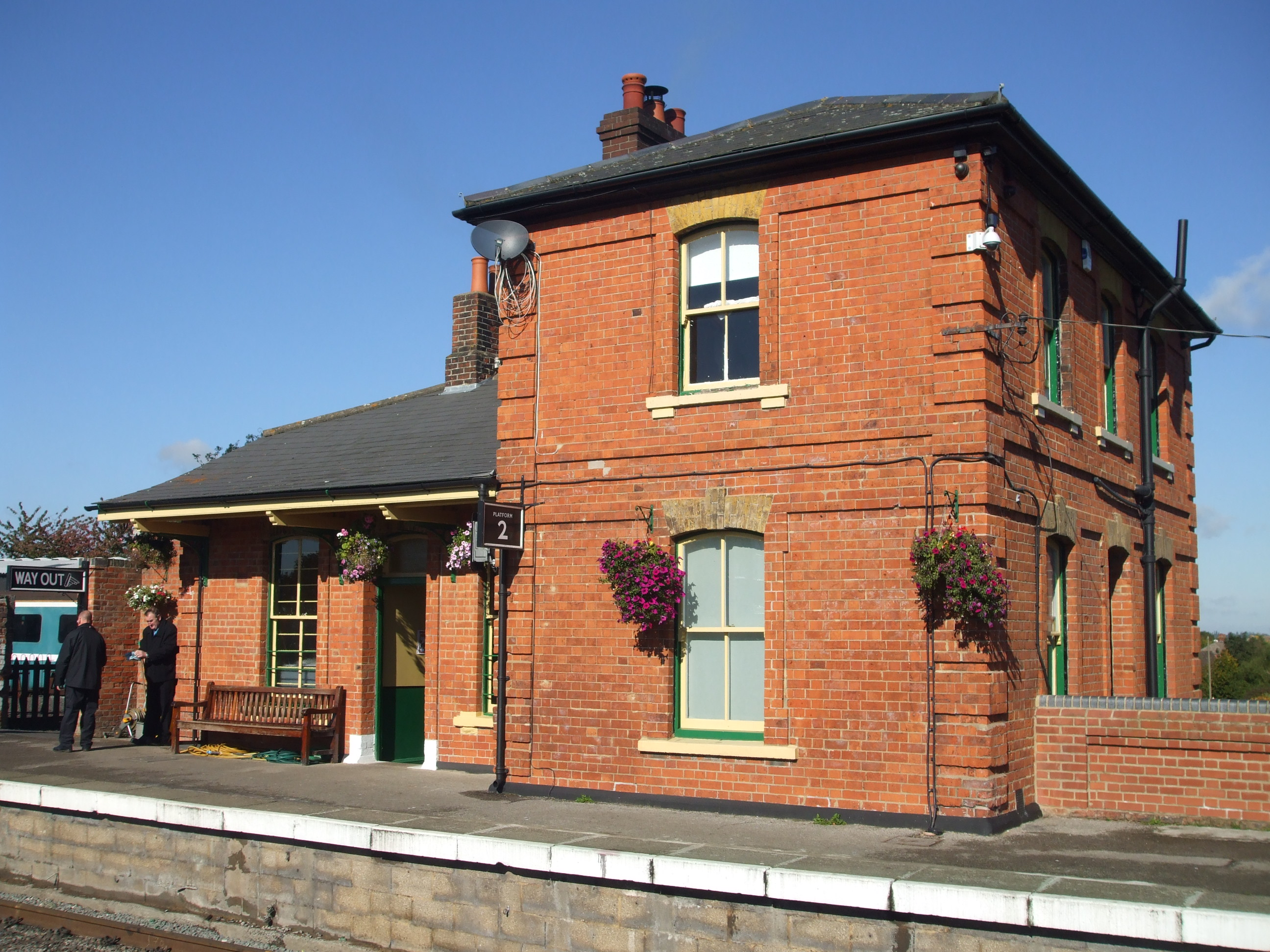

General information
- Location: North Weald, Epping Forest; England
- Coordinates: 51.71167°N 0.16167°E
- Grid reference: TL496036
- System: Station on heritage railway
- Operator: Epping Ongar Railway
- Platforms: 2

History
- Original company: Great Eastern Railway
- Pre-grouping: Great Eastern Railway
- Post-grouping: London and North Eastern Railway

Key dates
- 24 April 1865: Station opened
- 25 September 1949: Transferred to Central line
- 18 November 1957: Line electrified
- 6 January 1964: Goods yard closed
- 30 September 1994: Closed
- November 2004: Reopened in preservation
- 2007: Closed
- May 2012: Heritage services opened
Location

North Weald railway station is on the Epping Ongar Railway, a heritage railway, located in North Weald, Essex.

The station was opened in 1865 by the Great Eastern Railway, on its extension from Loughton to Ongar. It was latterly a Central line station on the London Underground between Epping and Blake Hall stations. The section beyond Epping to Ongar closed in 1994.

== History ==
North Weald station was opened by the Great Eastern Railway (GER) on 24 April 1865, serving principally as a goods yard, taking agricultural produce from the nearby farms into London. During World War II it was frequently used by airmen travelling to and from the nearby North Weald Airfield. Steam locomotives operated by British Railways for the London Underground ran a shuttle service from Epping to Ongar (stopping at North Weald) from 1949 to 1957, when the track was electrified and taken over by the Central line.

While the Epping to Ongar branch was normally operated as an isolated section of the Central line, for two days every year trains were run from London to terminate at North Weald: these trains served the North Weald Airshow on the Saturday and Sunday of its opening at the aerodrome almost adjacent to the station. The normal Epping to Ongar shuttle dovetailed with this service passing the terminating train on the adjacent line during its southbound journey.

The line from Epping to Ongar is a single-track railway apart from at North Weald, which functioned as the only available passing loop for trains travelling in opposite directions. In 1888, however, the eastern end of the loop was severed and it was used only as a siding. The loop was restored in 1949 after transfer to London Transport, and a second (westbound) platform was built at this time, and both platforms were used from 1949 until 1976, the westbound track being lifted in 1978. Until this time, access to the two platforms was controlled from the original Eastern Counties Railway signal box still sited on the southbound platform to this day. Until this occurred, North Weald was the last section of the Underground network to be signalled using mechanical semaphore signals. Although disused, the illuminated track diagram in the signal box continued to show the progress of trains until its closure.

=== Closure ===
The Epping to Ongar branch was not heavily used and became increasingly unprofitable. The service was further undermined when the Greater London Council removed the running subsidy for the line because it was not within the boundary of Greater London, and no comparable subsidy was forthcoming from the local government agencies in Essex, which meant that fare levels were much higher than on the rest of the Underground network. Initially, the Sunday service was dropped, and then the Saturday service. Subsequently, the service was restricted to a peak-only service of seven trains in each direction per day (three in the morning and four in the evening). London Transport (later London Underground Ltd) had made repeated representations to the government to close the line, but each was refused as there was no alternative mode of transport between Epping and Ongar.

A final request was made in 1994 with a proviso that the line was to be sold to a private organisation which would continue to run the services. With the promise of continued services, the government finally agreed to London Underground closing the line. The line, including North Weald station, was closed on 30 September 1994. Because of the intention to continue services, the line was left largely intact, although the two electric conductor rails were lifted. However, the promised service did not immediately materialise, and it was not until 2004 that a volunteer force restored a partial service as a heritage railway. Because London Underground would not provide platform space at Epping, North Weald is currently the westernmost terminus of the line. A shuttle does run further west as far as Coopersale, but there are no station facilities there. It is intended to run to a separate station facility near Epping station in the future.

=== Current ownership ===
EOR totem

North Weald station, as with the rest of the 6.5-mile branch reaching to the outskirts of Epping station, is undergoing significant improvement and infrastructure works in connection with its use as a heritage railway. These works are designed with the long-term future of the branch and to enable the use of locomotive-hauled trains (hauled by steam and diesel locomotives).

The station itself has been extensively restored with all the rooms being restored to their original uses. The original GER signalbox dating from 1888 is being restored, complete with its original lever frame, as part of the works to signal the passing loop which has been reinstated through the station. The westbound platform has been restored, with a new accessible ramp installed, and an original GER latticework footbridge (formerly from Woodford) is in the process of being installed to replace the British Rail concrete structure.

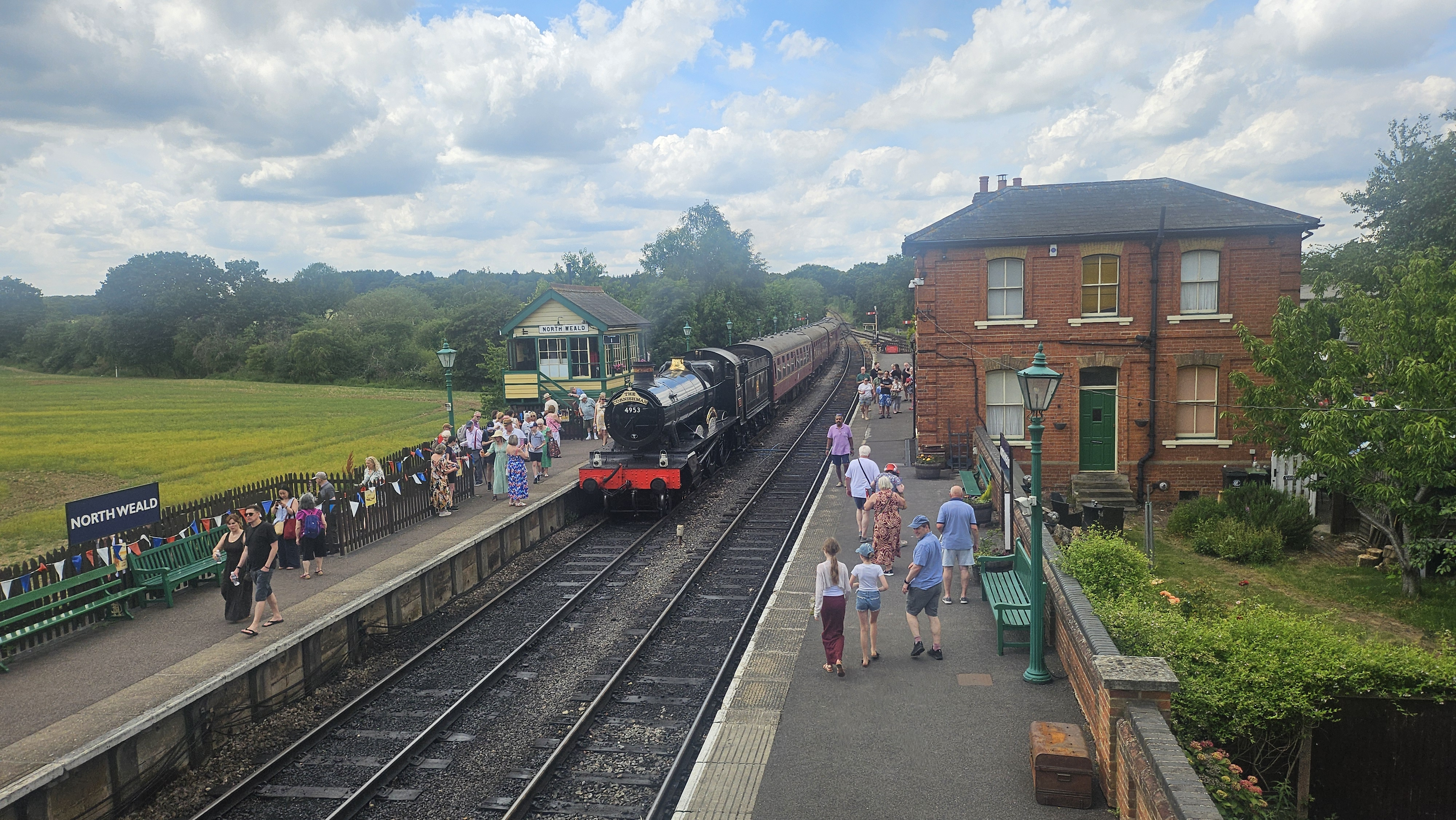
The station in June 2026. GWR 4900 Class 4953 Pitchford Hall stands in the platform with a rake of coaches.

The branch once again runs locomotive-hauled trains between Ongar and North Weald, with a diesel shuttle towards Coopersale and connecting heritage buses to Epping.

== Connections ==
Local bus routes 62, 380, 381, 396, 501 (Sundays only), SB06 and Vintage Route 339 serve the station (and North Weald village).

== Trivia ==
The station was used as a filming location for a scene in the Heartstopper Netflix show.

== See also ==
- List of former and unopened London Underground stations

Preceding station	Heritage railways	Following station
Epping Forest Terminus	Epping Ongar Railway	Ongar Terminus
Historical railways
Preceding station	London Underground	Following station
Epping Terminus	Central line Epping-Ongar branch	Blake Hall towards Ongar
Epping; Line closed, station open	Great Eastern Railway; Loughton-Ongar	Blake Hall; Line open, station closed
