= Blake Hall tube station =

Disused railway station in Greensted, Essex, England

Blake Hall
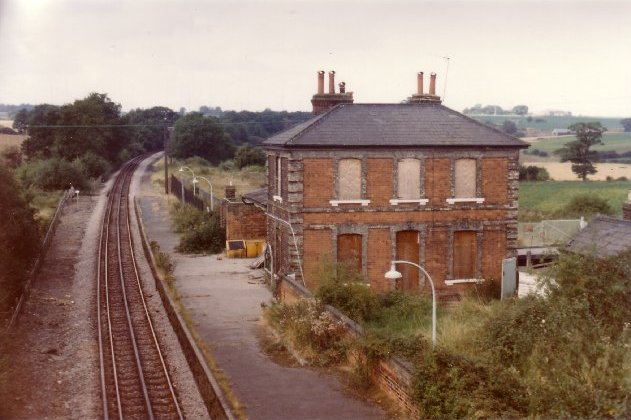
- Blake Hall station, taken in 1982 (a year after the closure)
- Interactive map of Blake Hall

General information
- Location: Greensted
- Local authority: Epping Forest
- Owner: Great Eastern Railway
- Number of platforms: 1

Key dates
- 24 April 1865: Opened
- 2 November 1981: Closed
- Replaced by: None

Other information
- Coordinates: 51.7120213°N 0.2030285°E

Blake Hall is a disused former station on the London Underground in the civil parish of Stanford Rivers, and south from the village of Bobbingworth in Essex. It was latterly on the Central line, between North Weald and Ongar, but was originally served by the Epping to Ongar shuttle service branch line.

It was opened in 1865 and named after Blake Hall, a country house located a mile or so to the northeast and inhabited by the Capel-Cure family of substantial local land-owners. The station was closed in 1981.

== History ==
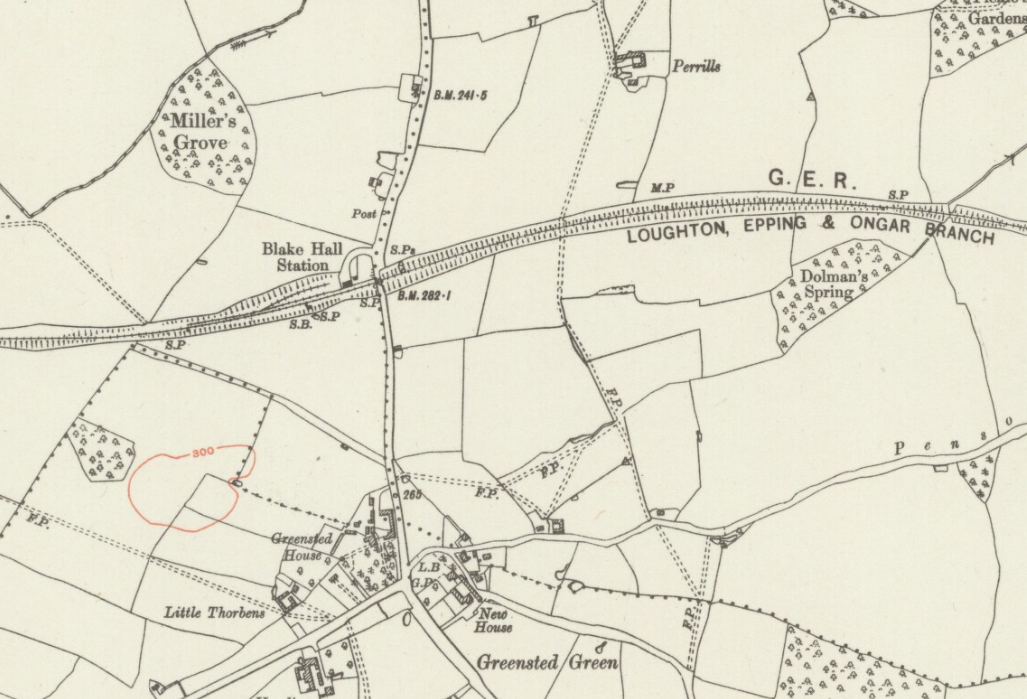
Blake Hall station, 1923

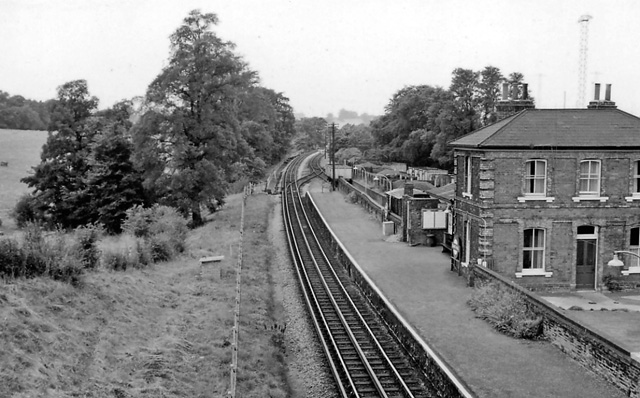
View westward, towards Epping in 1961

Blake Hall station was opened by the Great Eastern Railway on 24 April 1865, serving principally as a goods yard carrying agricultural produce from the nearby farms into London. Steam locomotives operated by British Railways for the Underground ran a shuttle service from Epping to Ongar, stopping at Blake Hall, from 1949 until 1957, when the line was electrified and taken over by the Underground's Central line. On 18 April 1966 the goods yard was closed and Blake Hall became a dedicated passenger station. On 17 October 1966, Sunday services were withdrawn.

Blake Hall became reputed as the least-used station on the entire Underground network. Fare subsidies provided on the rest of the system were not provided on this part of the line because local government agencies for Essex and London failed to agree on their respective public transport responsibilities, and Blake Hall station was located a considerable distance from any substantial settlement. By the time the last train ran on 31 October 1981, the station was reported to have only 17 passengers per day. It was permanently closed on 2 November 1981. The Epping to Ongar branch line was reduced to a peak hours only service at the same time. It closed 13 years later, on 30 September 1994.

Blake Hall's station building has since been converted into a private home and the line passing the station site is now privately owned and operated as a heritage railway by the Epping Ongar Railway. The platform was demolished after closure. A short section of the platform was later reinstated in May 2012 but this is for aesthetic purposes only, and the station remains closed.

== See also ==
- List of former and unopened London Underground stations

Historical railways
North Weald; Line and station open	Great Eastern Railway; Loughton-Ongar	Ongar; Line and station open
Preceding station	London Underground	Following station
North Weald towards Epping	Central line Epping-Ongar branch	Ongar Terminus
