= Tomb of John De Pitchford =

Coordinates: 52.6343°N 2.6994°W

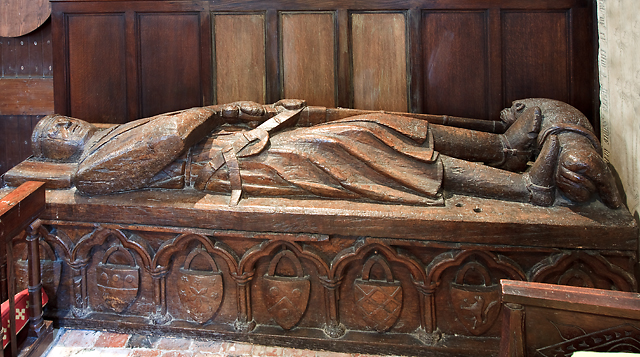
The carved oak tomb of Sir John de Pitchford (d. 1285)

The Tomb of John De Pitchford is a 13th-century carved effigy and tomb chest in St Michael and All Angels’ Church, Pitchford, Shropshire, England.

Although little record survives of John De Pitchford's life apart from the fact that he died in 1285. His ancestral home was a previous manor house on the site of the current Pitchford Hall. His family also owned Albrighton Manor. He was a Knight who served under King Edward I against Llewelyn. His monument is positioned in the chancel of the church, and is made from solid oak, making it one of only three extant 13th-century English tombs retaining their original wooden elements.

== Description ==
De Pitchford's head rests on a flat and shallow cushion, and is dressed in garments that include a knee-length surcoat. He holds a sword, but his shield is now missing (the remnants of its holding strap can be seen on his left side). The animal at his feet may be either a lion or a dog. The effigy rests on an oblong chest whose sides are lined with niches containing three-foiled arches, within which are heraldry shields seemingly hanging on hooks from the arches.

As traces of paint have been found on it, the wood may have originally been painted with bright colours.

== Sources ==
- Fryer, Alfred Cooper. Wooden Monumental Effigies In England And Wales. London: Archaeologia or Miscellaneous Tracts relating to Antiquity, 1909, republished 1924
- Tummers, H.A. Early Secular Effigies in England: The Thirteenth Century. Leiden: Brill Archive, 1980. ISBN 978-9-0040-6255-9
