= Epping Ongar Railway =

Heritage railway in Essex, England

Coordinates: 51.71108°N 0.18505°E

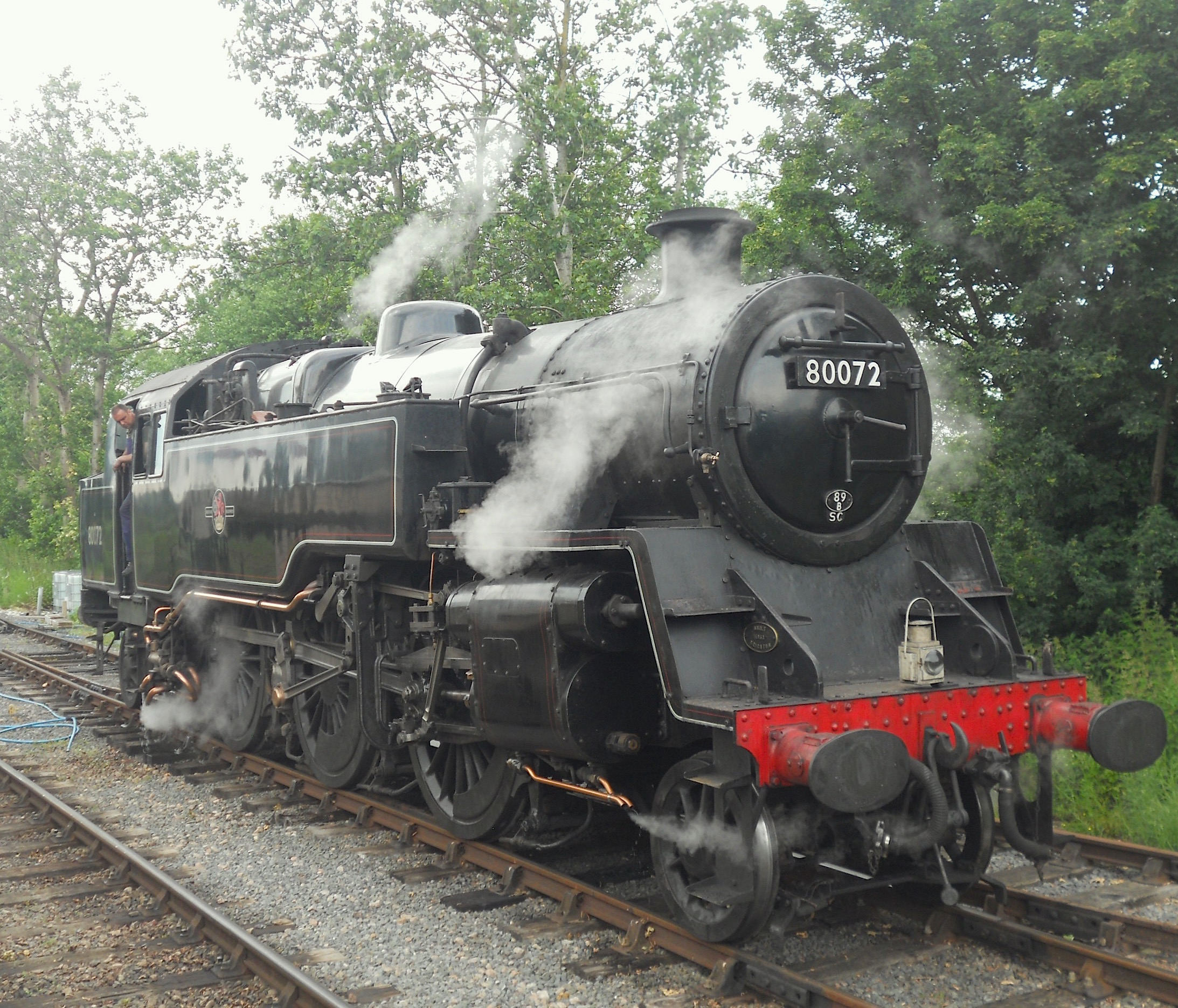
- British Railways 2-6-4T Class Standard Four No. 80072 at Ongar
- Locale: Essex
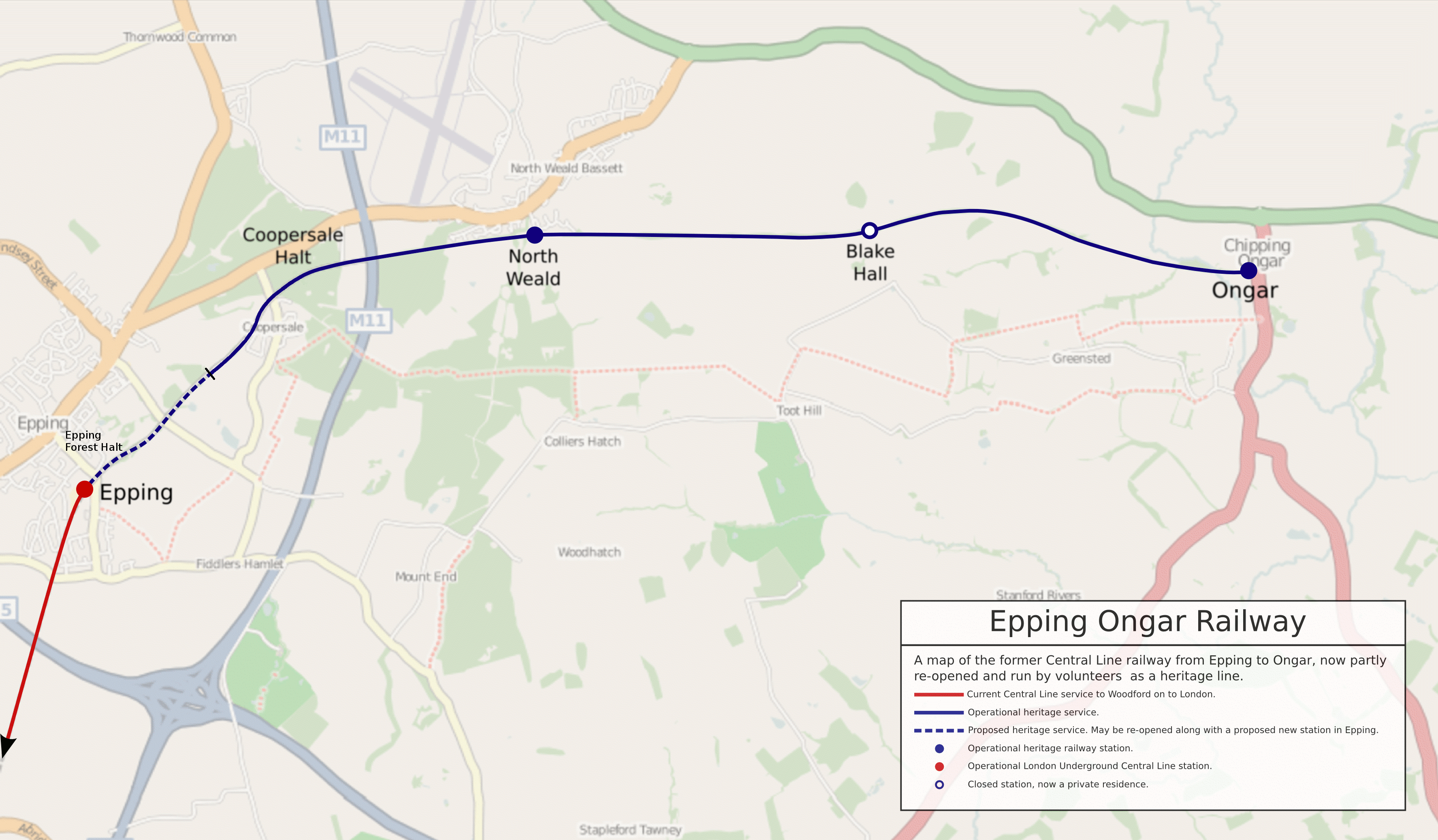
- Services extend only as far as Stonards Hill, although it is planned to extend the line to a new station at Epping.

Commercial operations
- Original gauge: 4 ft 8 1/2 in (1,435 mm) standard gauge

Preserved operations
- Owned by: Epping Ongar Railway Ltd.
- Stations: 2
- Length: 6 1/2 miles (10.5 km) Single track throughout except a passing loop at North Weald
- Preserved gauge: 4 ft 8 1/2 in (1,435 mm) standard gauge

Commercial history
- Opened: 1865
- Closed: 1994

Preservation history
- 2004: Re-opened and taken over for Preservation
- 2007: Closed
- 2012: Re-opened

The Epping Ongar Railway is a heritage railway in south-west Essex, England, run by a small number of paid staff and a team of volunteers. It was the final section of the Great Eastern Railway branch line, later the London Underground's Central line from Loughton via Epping to Ongar, with intermediate stations at North Weald and Blake Hall. The line was closed by London Underground in 1994 and sold in 1998. It reopened between 2004 and 2007 as a preserved railway, offering a volunteer-run Class 117 DMU service between Ongar and Coopersale. A change of ownership in 2007 led to the line being closed for restoration to a heritage steam railway, which opened on 25 May 2012.

== Early workings ==
The line to Ongar was opened in 1865 by the Great Eastern Railway, as an extension to its line from Stratford to Loughton that had been opened in 1856 by its predecessor, the Eastern Counties Railway. The extension was single-track, but whereas the Loughton to Epping section was doubled in 1893, the section between Epping and Ongar always remained single, apart from a passing loop at North Weald on opening. The eastern end of the loop was severed in 1888, converting it into a siding. About 14 trains each day went to Ongar; the rest terminated at Loughton or Epping.

This remained the case until 1949, when the London Passenger Transport Board's New Works scheme extended the Central line to Epping using electric trains, taking over the railway from British Railways. The Epping-Ongar branch lost its through trains to London, and there was a shuttle service between Epping (to connect with trains to London) and Ongar; for eight years, there was the unusual sight of steam trains and London Underground electric multiple units side by side at Epping. The steam shuttle was hired by London Transport from British Railways, as it was felt there was no justification for electrification to Ongar unless patronage of the branch rose. Upon taking over the branch in 1949, London Transport re-converted the siding at North Weald into a passing loop and built a second platform to serve a new westbound track.

In the 1950s, there were attempts to improve the service on the branch, and it was electrified in 1957. Due to the low-cost electrification, although the branch could support eight-car trains as far as North Weald, a maximum of four cars could run to Ongar. The voltage drop along the end-fed line was too great to support full-length trains, and the short platforms were not long enough for eight-car trains. Hence the Epping to Ongar branch was normally operated as an isolated extension of the Central line, with a few through workings south to Loughton. However, for two days every year there were through trains from London to North Weald, for the North Weald airshow, on the Saturday and Sunday of its opening at the aerodrome almost adjacent to the station. The normal Epping to Ongar shuttle dovetailed with this service, passing the terminating trains on the adjacent line during its westbound journey. The through trains were operated as extra trains on the normal weekend Central line timetables, only four cars long due to the restricted platform length at North Weald.

== Cutbacks and closure ==
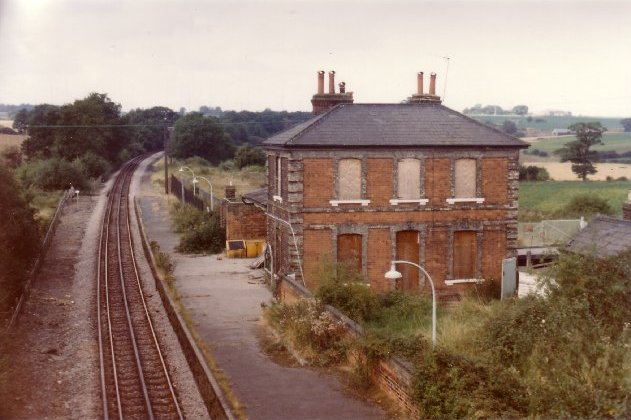
The little-used Blake Hall station, rumoured to be used by only six customers a day at the time, was closed in 1981 and converted into a private residence.

From the late 1960s, it became clear that the line's patronage was not growing as had been expected, mainly due to restriction of development in what was now designated Metropolitan Green Belt land. Even at its peak in 1971, the 650 passengers daily hardly made the line an economic proposition. London Underground tried to close the entire line in 1980, but a reduced service was implemented instead, along with the closing of Blake Hall on Sundays.

North Weald's platform one was closed in 1976; then the passing loop/westbound track was lifted in 1978. Until that time, the station was controlled from the original Eastern Counties Railway signal box, which is still sited on the westbound platform, now fully restored. North Weald was the last section of the London Underground to be signalled with mechanical semaphore signals.

When Blake Hall was closed in 1981, it was said to be handling only six customers a day. The station building survives as a private dwelling.

On 30 September 1994, the line was closed. It was making a loss of £7 for each passenger journey and was in need of some expensive maintenance work. At the time of closure the line was carrying a mere 80 passengers a day. Local lore had it that the line was being kept open in case the Cabinet needed to be evacuated to the Kelvedon Hatch Secret Nuclear Bunker at Doddinghurst. The track was left intact along with the stations, but not maintained.

The last Underground train used on the branch, a three-car unit of 1960 stock, has been preserved by Cravens Heritage Trains. It made a return to the reopened heritage railway in 2014, to mark the 20th anniversary of the line's closure by London Underground.

One unusual feature of the line is its continuing nominal importance to the London Underground. In 1971/72 the London Underground was remeasured in kilometres. The then most easterly point, Ongar, was chosen as the zero point, and remains so to the present.

== Purchase and reopening ==
The line was purchased by Pilot Developments (later Epping Ongar Railway Ltd) in 1998. The Ongar Railway Preservation Society entered a £325,000 offer for the line, but Pilot Developments convinced London Underground to accept its slightly higher offer after the bidding deadline. Independent politician Martin Bell described the deal as "the most controversial land deal in the constituency for years", alleging a conflict of interest with local politicians. The line was reopened by the Epping Ongar Railway Volunteer Society on Sunday 10 October 2004, providing an hourly service between Ongar and North Weald. The line was shortly after extended to Coopersale, although there are no boarding or alighting facilities there.

Between 22 January and 9 April 2006 the line was shut down for engineering works. This involved general station maintenance, rolling stock maintenance and track maintenance. Ongar station remained closed for engineering works and general maintenance and reopened on 28 May 2006 without the use of the station buildings.

On Easter weekend 2007, the railway had the most visitors on a single day since reopening, on the Sunday and Monday. The Teddy Bears' Picnic, Anniversary of Reopening and Halloween events are also popular.

At the end of 2007, as a result of the awarding of planning permission for the Ongar residential development, the railway was sold to a new private owner who was committed to bringing steam back to the line.

Following the change of ownership in 2007, it was decided to suspend train operations and to concentrate on improving the track. This was done in order to undertake the major engineering works to secure its long-term future and facilitate the return of steam to the line, including restoration of station buildings, run-round loops, full signalling, and coal and water facilities. There have been major changes to the Ongar and North Weald stations.

=== Ongar ===
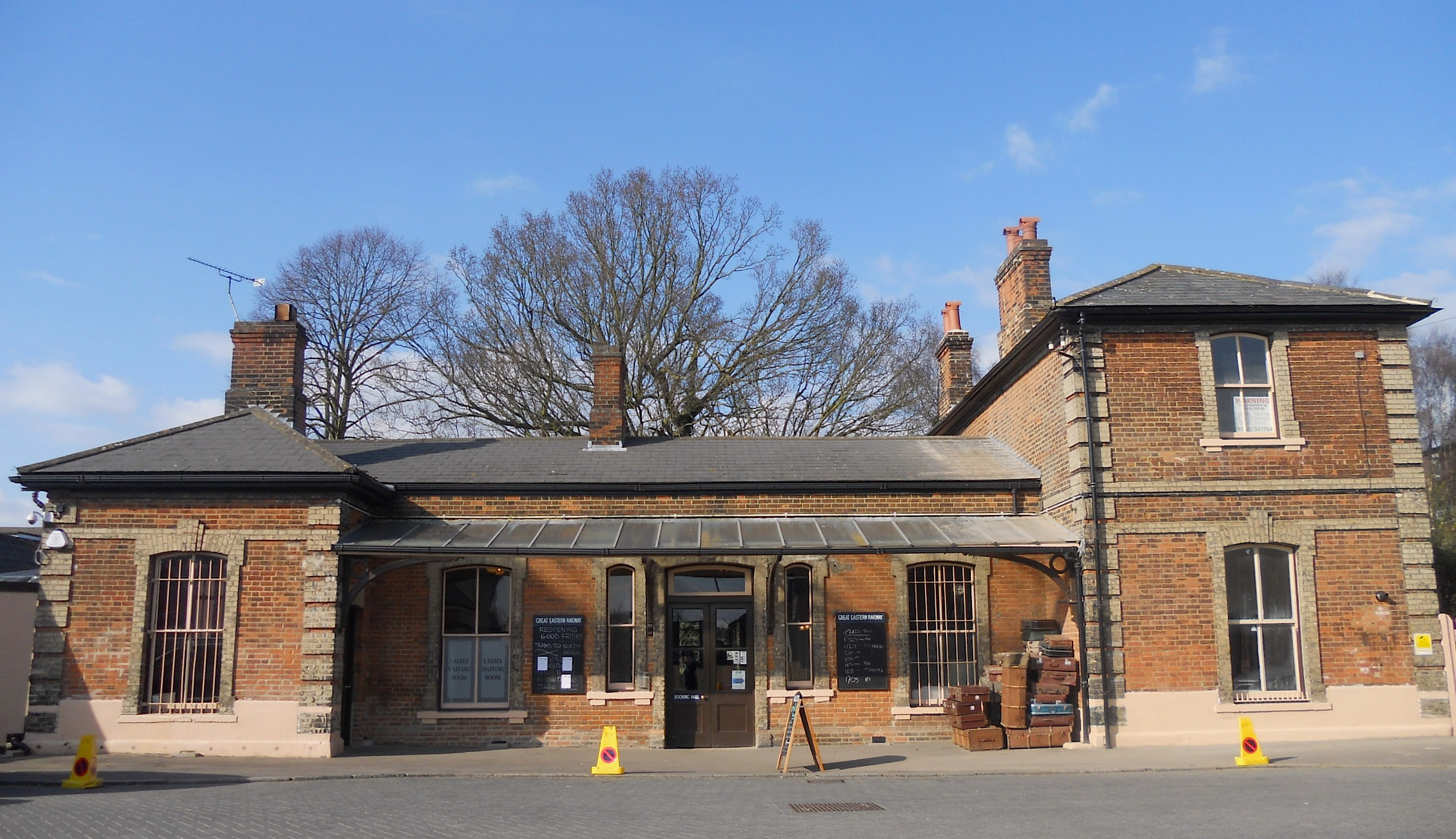
The station building at Ongar

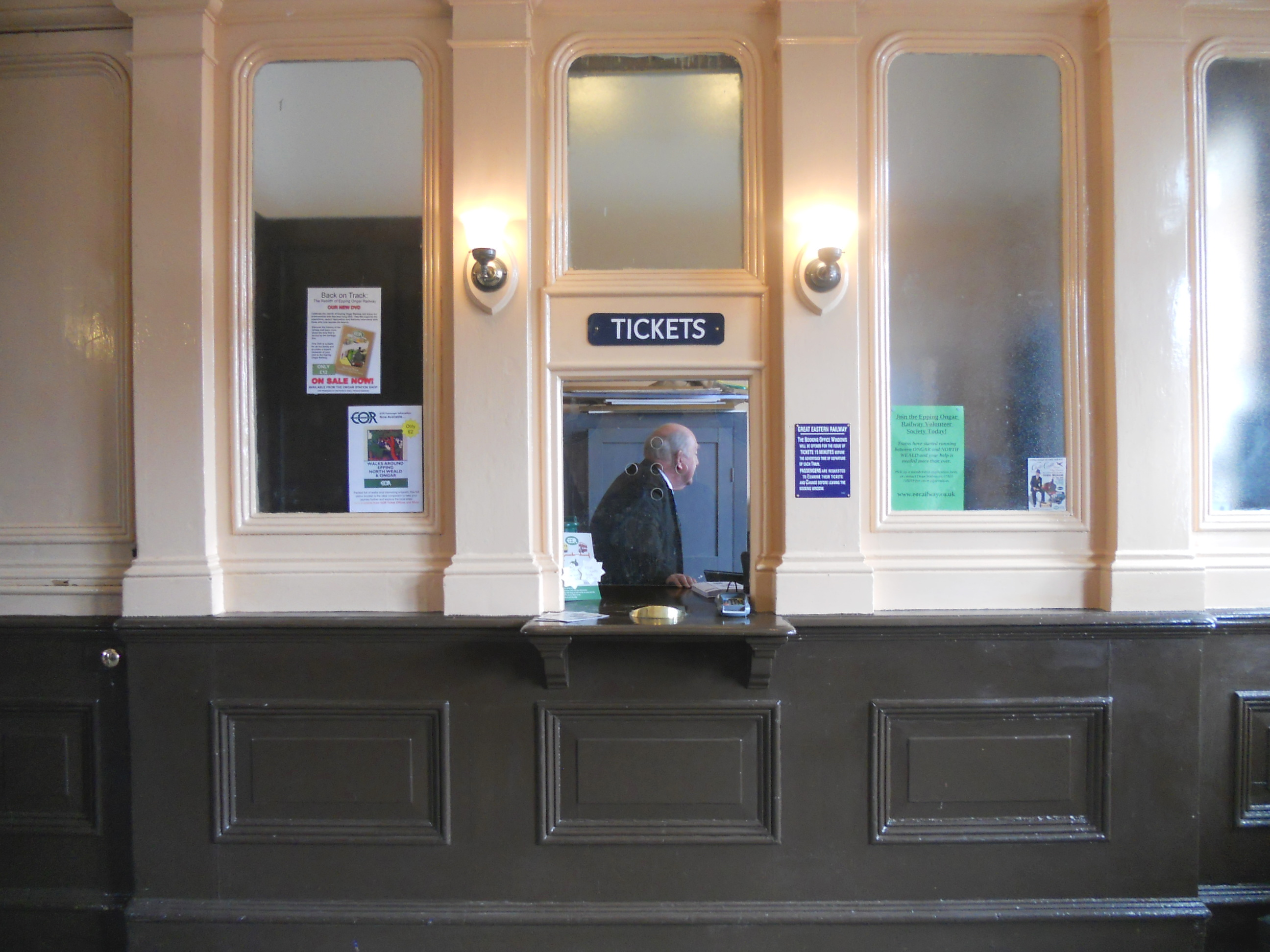
The booking office at Ongar Station

The goods yard area (derelict since the 1960s) was purchased by David Wilson Homes, which has built a small collection of houses. The Cattle Dock remains, as does the main station building, which has been repainted in GER colours (1900–1930s). Ongar is the only operational GER station in GER colours. Shop and refreshment facilities are available in the main building.

The milk dock is being restored into a bay platform, which will become Platform 2.

All the track has been lowered to accommodate British Rail mainline rolling stock, and a new signal box has been installed at the end of platform 2 in the style of the original and incorporating the original signal frame, which was saved when the original box was demolished. Most of the points and signals are now connected to this.

=== North Weald ===
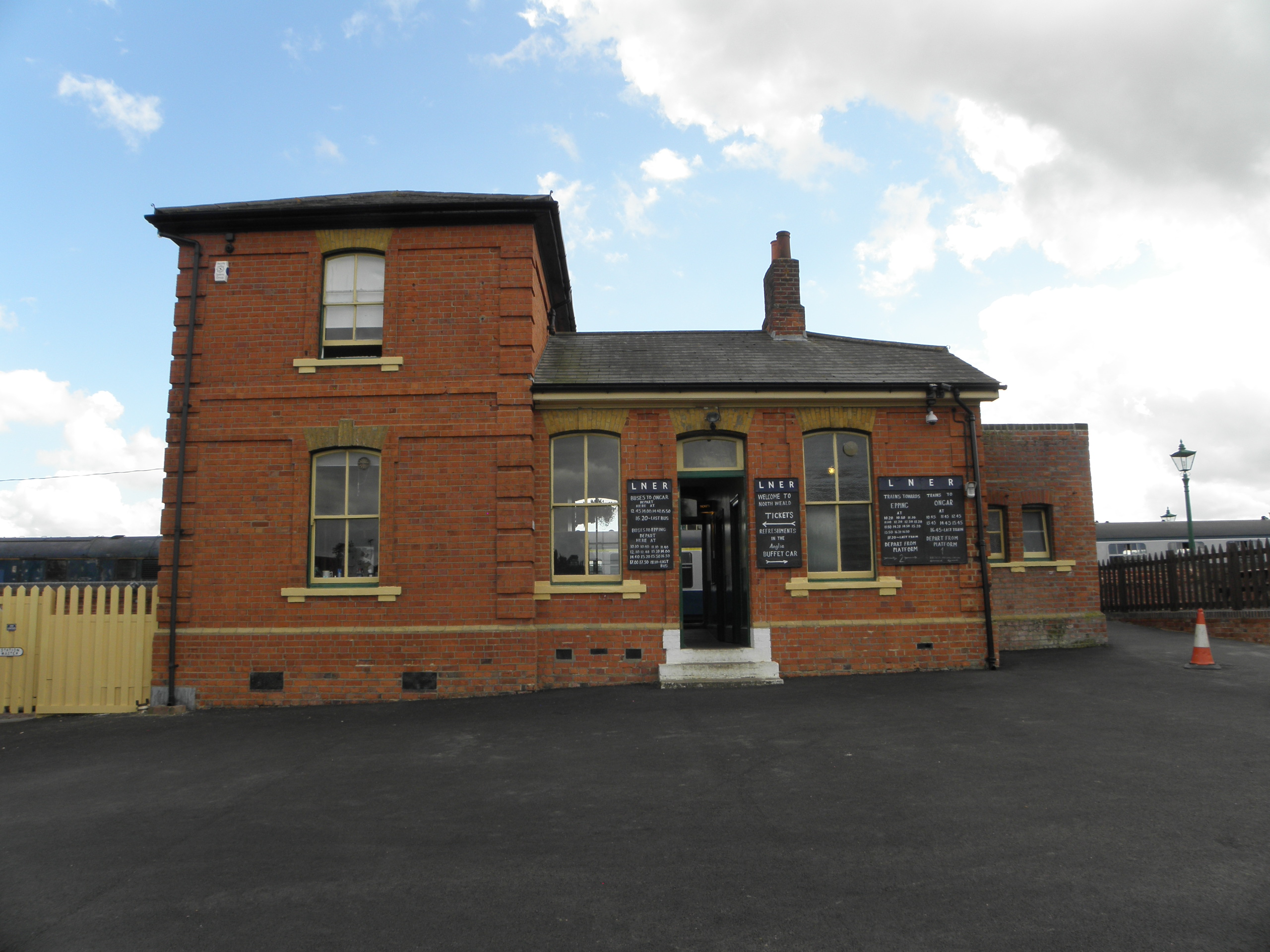
The station building at North Weald

North Weald has been repainted in LNER/BR (E) (1940s–1960s) colours, Brunswick green and cream.

The track height has been lowered to accommodate UK standard stock, and the track has been relaid through the loop and into the bay platform, making three operational platforms; the new signalling allows bi-directional working, gives access to improved siding facilities, and enables safer shunting.

=== Epping Forest ===
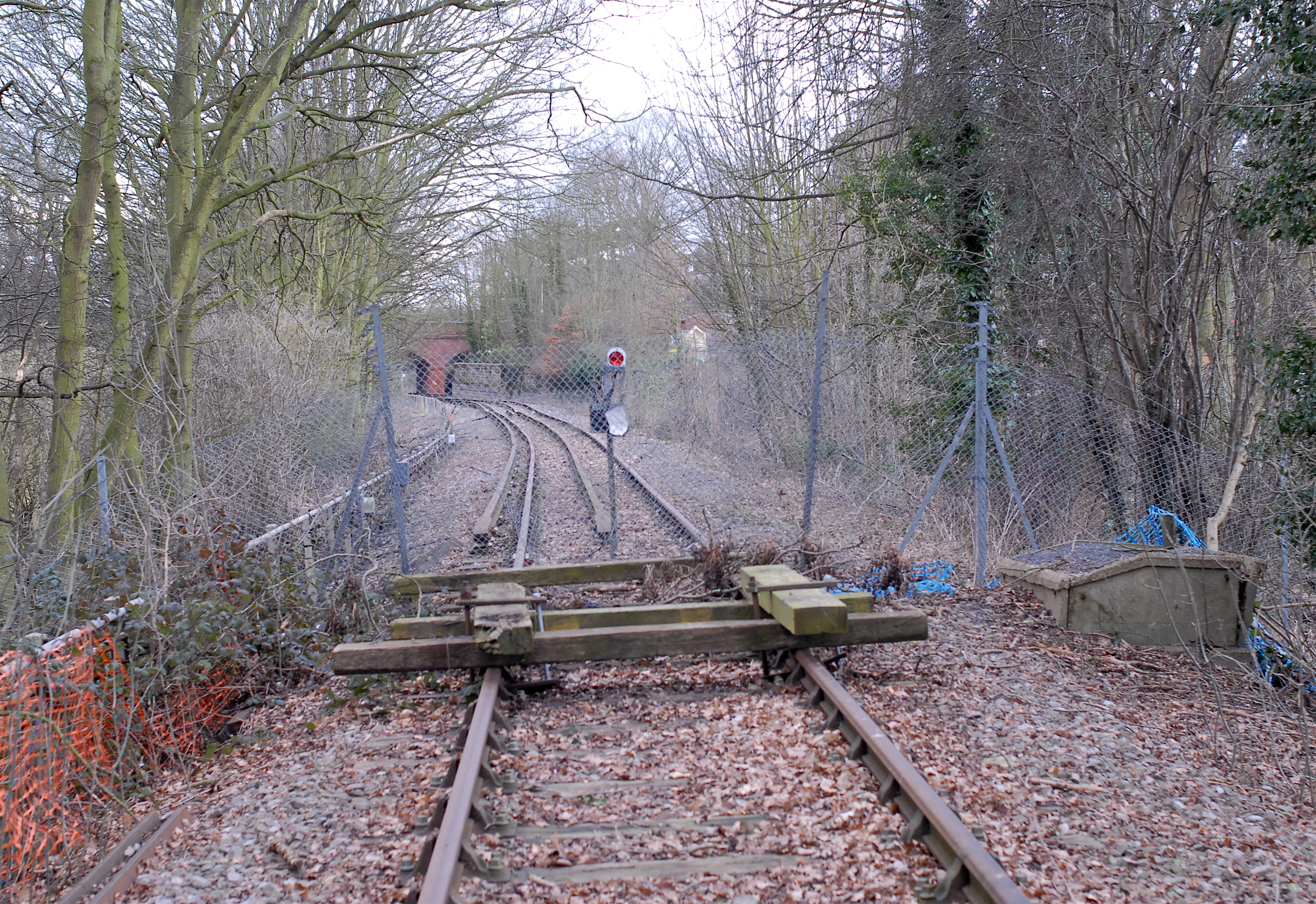
Railway track close to Epping tube station (Epping Forest Halt). Passengers cannot yet alight here due to the absence of a platform.

The rail service has been extended from Coopersale to a halt called Epping Forest, about 100 metres from the London Underground station. It is impossible to alight at Epping, but the EOR intends to build a platform at the site.

== Resumption of passenger services ==
In March 2012 Epping Ongar Railway announced a resumption of services from 25 May 2012, coinciding with the 150th year since the Great Eastern Railway was formed. On the weekend starting 25 May the railway operated a special service. It now runs train services every weekend and bank holiday in the summer; during the Olympics in July–August 2012 at nearby Stratford, the line operated daily.

EOR runs steam- and diesel-hauled trains between Ongar and North Weald, a diesel shuttle from North Weald to Coopersale Lane, and heritage bus services connecting with surrounding towns and the Central line at Epping.

== Heritage railway operations ==
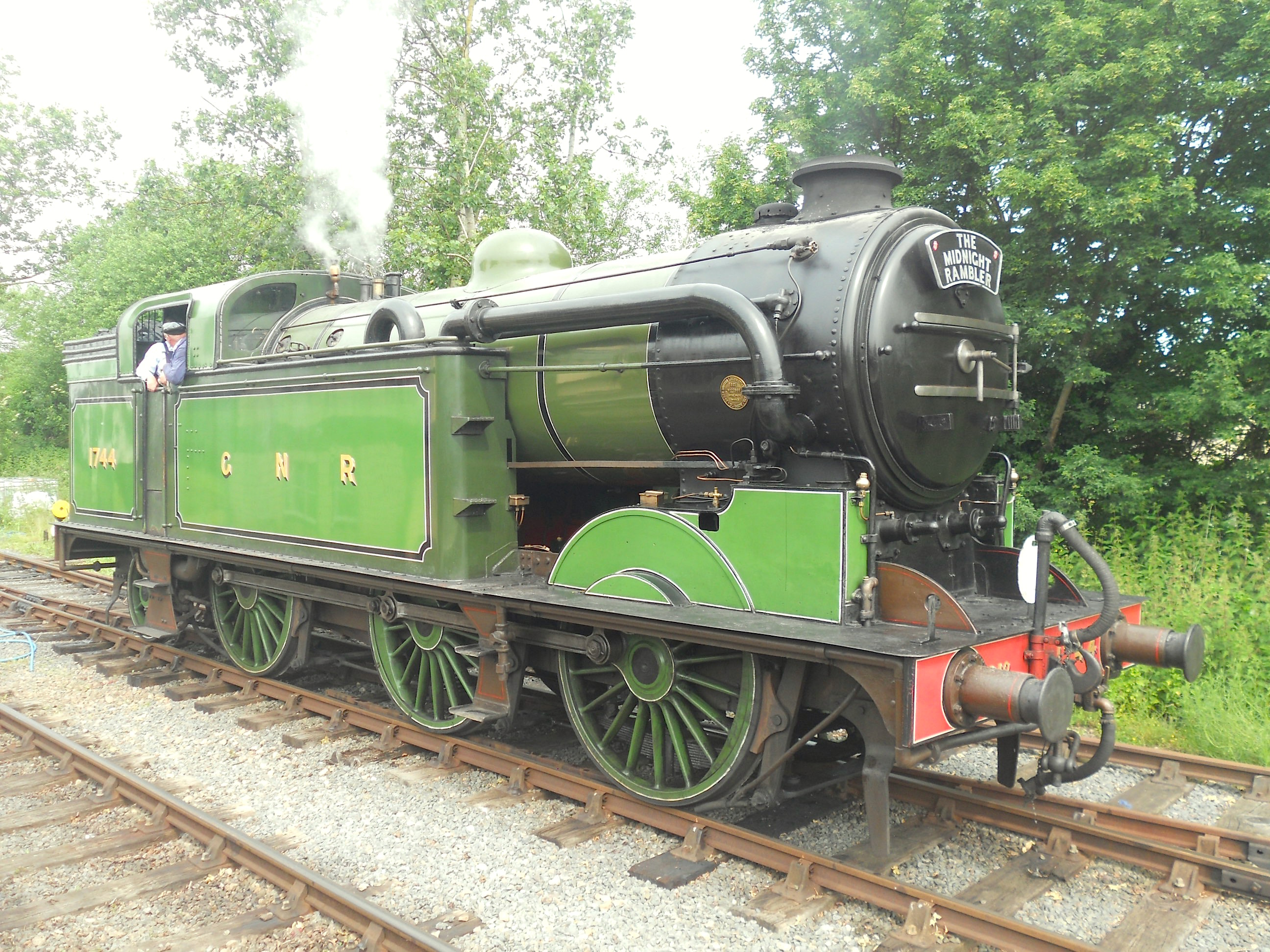
GNR 0-6-2T Class N2 No. 1744 runs round the train at Ongar

Between 2004 and 2007, the line ran an hourly service on Sundays and Bank Holidays, on the hour from Ongar, arriving at North Weald at 13 minutes past the hour before departing for Coopersale, and returning to North Weald at 33 minutes past the hour, then leaving for Ongar. The first train left Ongar at 11am, with the last returning at 3:50pm (4:50pm between April and September).

Since reopening in 2012 there have been trains on Saturdays, Sundays, Bank Holidays and some school holiday weekdays. The standard timetable has both a steam hauled train and DMU service in operation, with trains running from approximately 10 to 16:30.

== Current rolling stock ==
Reference:

== Plans ==
Map of the London Underground, including the Epping Ongar Railway with the proposed interchange at Epping

- North Weald: As part of the infrastructure works the railway is restoring the former goods yard, giving much-needed siding space, and putting back full signalling with both semaphore and colour-light signals. This enables locomotive-hauled trains and gives operational flexibility, enabling increased service frequency. The former Woodford GER latticework footbridge has been completed, replacing the condemned LU concrete structure, which has been demolished and removed.
- Ongar: With the track now relaid, works are progressing to restore the station and install signalling. Focus has turned to helping increase flexibility and service frequency, restoring the former cattle and milk platforms, all as part of the networks towards running passenger trains to Epping.
