= Clatterford End =

Clatterford End may refer to the following hamlets in Essex, England:

- Clatterford End, Fyfield, in the Epping Forest district
- Clatterford End, High Easter, in the Chelmsford and Uttlesford districts
- Clatterford End, Stanford Rivers, in the Epping Forest district
