= Clatterford End, Stanford Rivers =

Hamlet in Essex, England

Coordinates: 51.6975°N 0.2066°E

Clatterford End
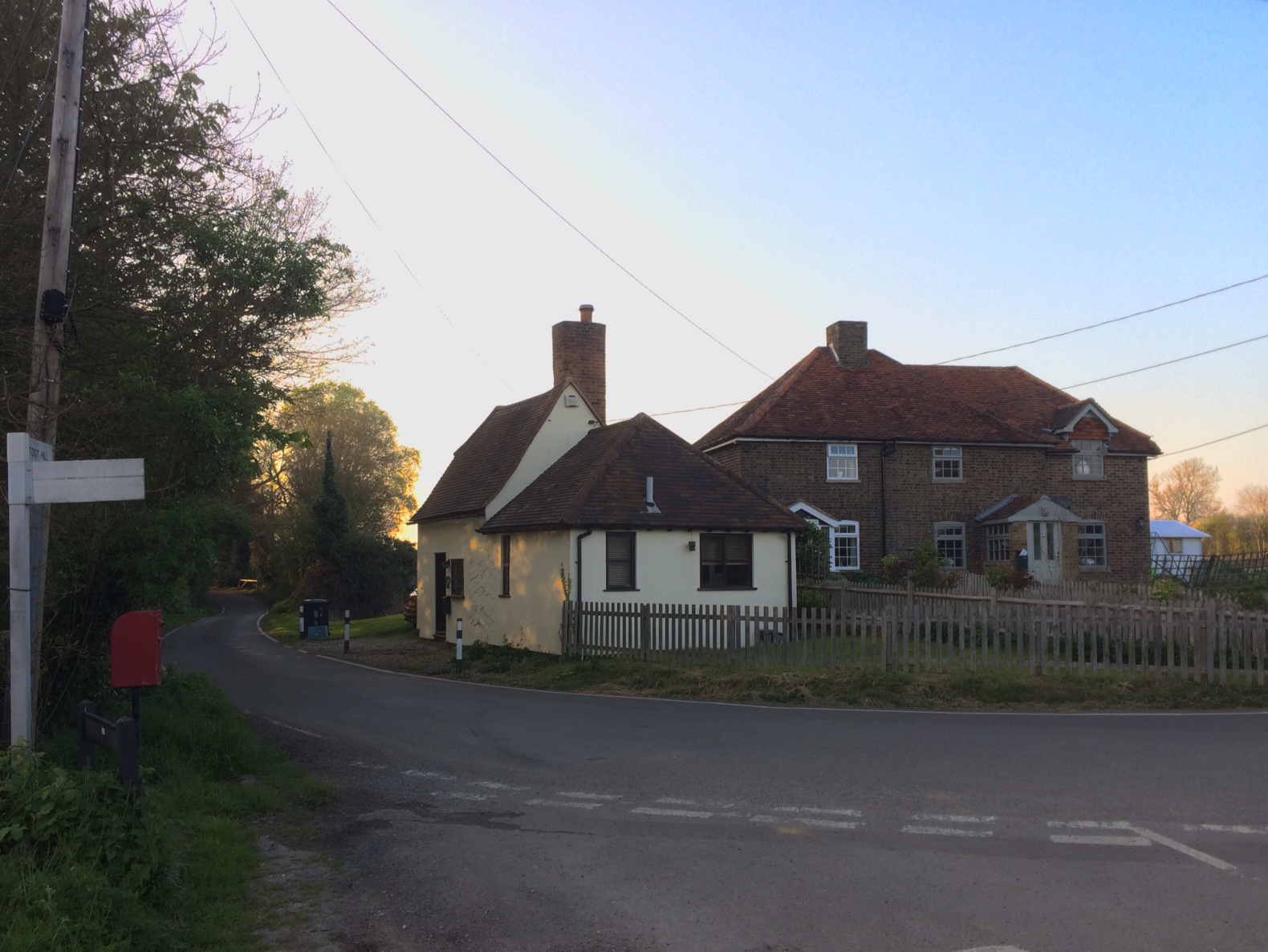
- Clatterford End hamlet

- Location within Essex
- Population: 50 (2015 estimate)
- OS grid reference: TL525021
- Civil parish: Stanford Rivers
- District: Epping Forest
- Shire county: Essex
- Region: East
- Country: England
- Sovereign state: United Kingdom
- Post town: ONGAR
- Postcode district: CM5
- Dialling code: 01992
- Police: Essex
- Fire: Essex
- Ambulance: East of England
- UK Parliament: Brentwood and Ongar

Clatterford End is hamlet in the civil parish of Stanford Rivers, and in the Epping Forest district of Essex, England. The hamlet is situated between the parish villages of Toot Hill and Stanford Rivers. It should not be confused with Clatterford End, Fyfield or Clatterford End, High Easter.

== History ==
The oldest building in the hamlet is Coleman's Farm, a 19th-century Grade II listed structure. It includes a former milking parlour which has been redundant since 1978 and a converted timber barn, now a dwelling.

Modern houses have since been built along the road.

The hamlet was essential in delivering agricultural produce to London, such as milk during the Second World War. The goods would be taken to Blake Hall station (1.6 miles away) and then taken to the city. The agricultural history and nature of the hamlet made it ideal for this purpose.

== Geography ==
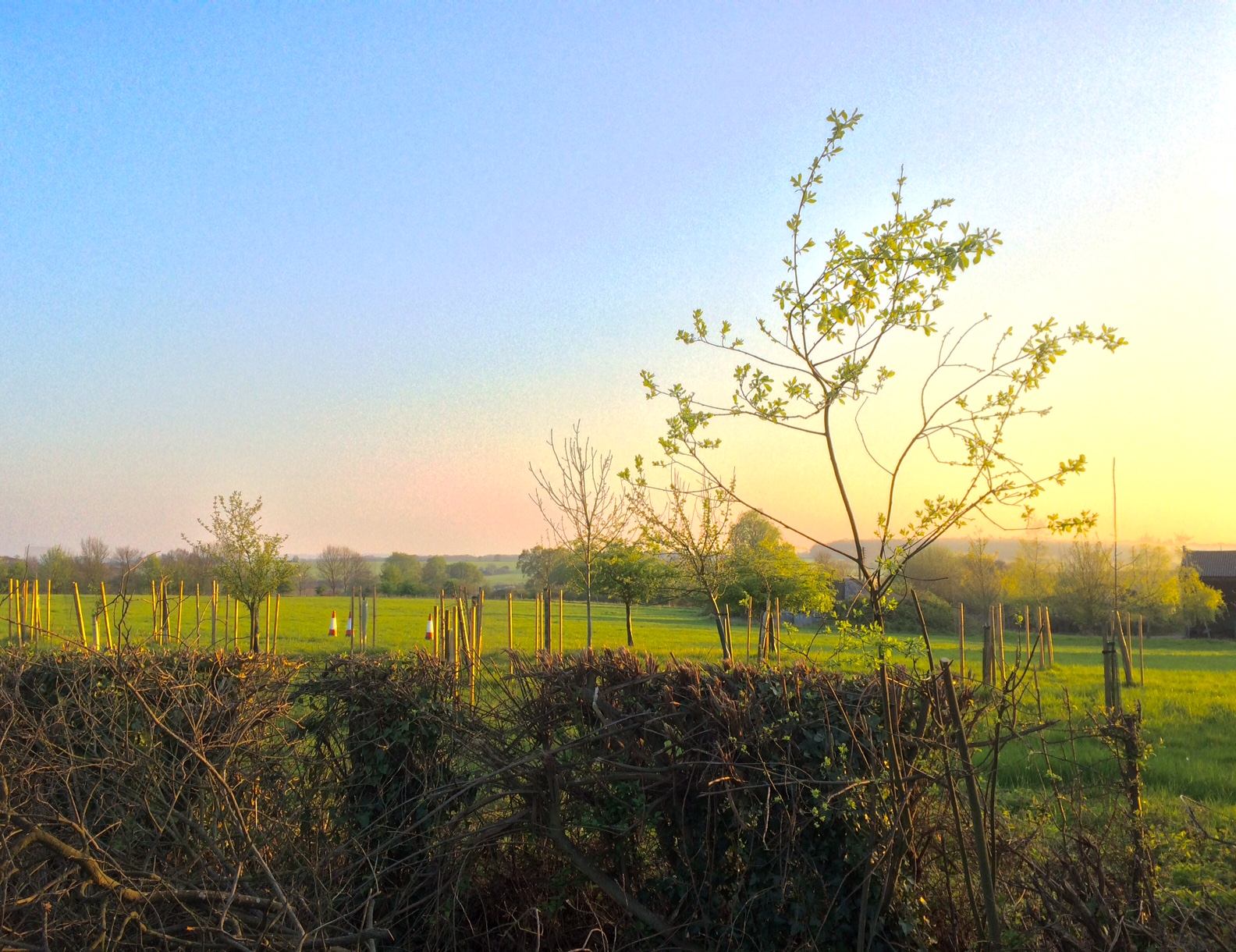
Some farmlands near Coleman's Farm in Clatterford End.

The land in the hamlet varies in elevation from approximately 74 ft. above sea-level to 81 ft. The River Roding runs near and forms the eastern and southern boundaries of the parish. A stream flows east across the north of the parish to join the Roding at Wash Bridge. Several smaller streams join the river farther south. Clatterford End is surrounded by large open fields and arable farms.

Clatterford End is 3 miles (5 km) south-west of Chipping Ongar and 6 miles (10 km) east of Epping, and is in the civil parish of Stanford Rivers, close to the settlements of Greensted Green, Greensted, Toot Hill, Bobbingworth, Bovinger, and Little End.

The hamlet is on Toot Hill Road, also referred to as Clatterford Road. This road leads to the Green Man public house in Toot Hill, meets Epping Road at a T-junction, and leads to Greensted Road and Greensted Green.

== Governance ==
Clatterford End is represented at Westminster by Alex Burghart, MP for Brentwood and Ongar.

In the 2015 local elections the Conservatives won 52% of the vote.

Clatterford End is represented on the Essex County Council under the Ongar & Rural division of the Epping Forest district. In the 2017 county council elections the Conservative candidate won the division seat with 68.2% of the vote, followed by the Liberal Democrats with 12.6%. Further losing candidates were those of Labour and Co-operative, UK Independence Party, and English Democrats whose candidate was Robin Tilbrook. The Conservative candidate held the seat with a swing of +5.5%.

The hamlet of Clatterford End is governed locally by the Stanford Rivers Parish Council, a group of seven parish councilors representing Toot Hill, Clatterford End, Stanford Rivers and Little End. Clatterford End itself doesn't have a parish councillor exclusively for the hamlet. The parish council organises events including the Country Show.

== Community ==
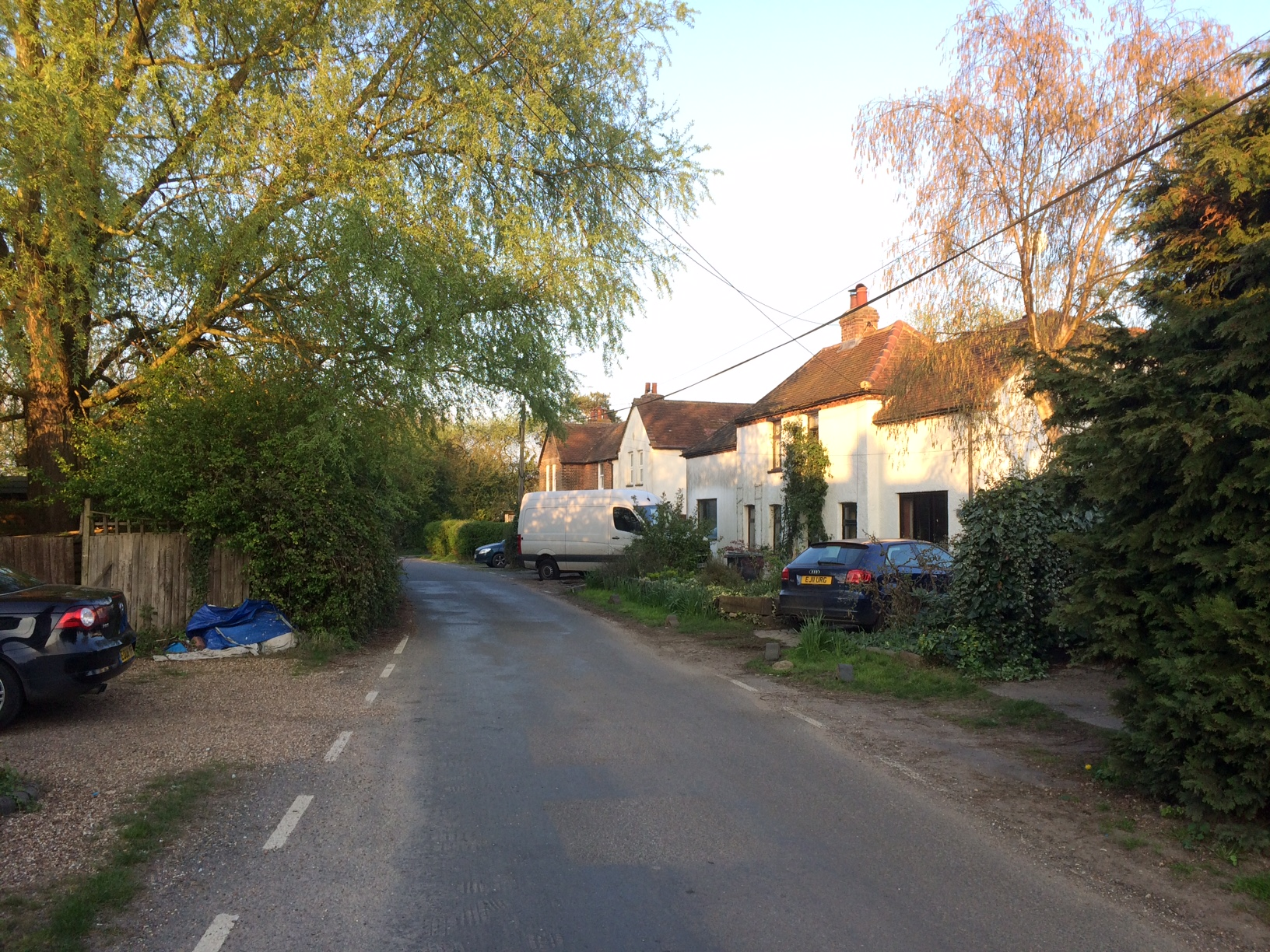
Toot Hill Road leading to Greensted. Some of the newer houses in Clatterford End.

The hamlet is one of the smallest in the area, and the smallest in the Stanford Rivers parish. It has an estimated population of 50, many of whom are farmers.

The hamlet has no shops or facilities, apart from one post-box, but consists of a small cluster of houses in one area with a number of scattered farms to the east and west. The hamlet is surrounded by arable fields used by the several farms which surround the area.

It is situated near Toot Hill Country Show which has taken place each year since 1953, which occurs on the first Saturday in August. The hamlet also has panoramic views of the Essex countryside. Aside from these features, Clatterford End is near the location of a sighting of the 'Beast of Ongar', a legendary 'panther-like' creature the size of a big cat, spotted in a field between Clatterford End and Stanford Rivers.

== Transport ==
=== Bus ===
Currently, the road running through Clatterford End is too narrow and weak to support the weight of a bus. The nearest bus stop is in the village of Toot Hill, to the west. These buses operate from Ongar to Epping, Epping to Harlow or Ongar to Harlow.

=== Train ===
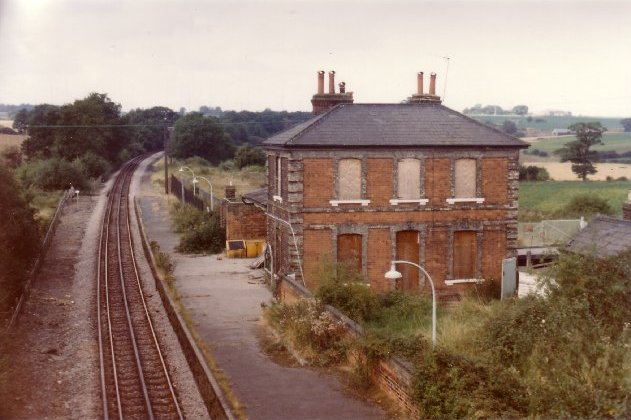
Blake Hall station after it was closed

The nearest station to Clatterford End is Epping which is served by the Central line. The closest National Rail service is from Harlow Town, which is served by the West Anglia Main Line and is operated by Greater Anglia.

Previously, the nearest station was Blake Hall (which lies between North Weald and Ongar stations), opened by the Great Eastern Railway on 1 April 1865, serving principally as a goods yard carrying agricultural produce from the nearby farms into London. Steam locomotives operated by British Railways for the London Underground ran a shuttle service from Epping to Ongar, stopping at Blake Hall, from 1949 until 1957, when the line was electrified and taken over by the Underground's Central line. On 18 April 1966 the goods yard was closed and Blake Hall became a dedicated passenger station. On 17 October 1966, Sunday services were withdrawn.

London Underground closed the station on 31 October 1981 due to a lack of custom. Some reports state that since the station was located a considerable distance from any substantial settlement, 17 passengers used it a day, making it the quietest on the entire London Underground network. Although the building remained, the platform was removed by LT when they heard that, despite the formal closure, some trains were still dropping off passengers. The platform has now been reinstated, though the building is now a privately owned house.

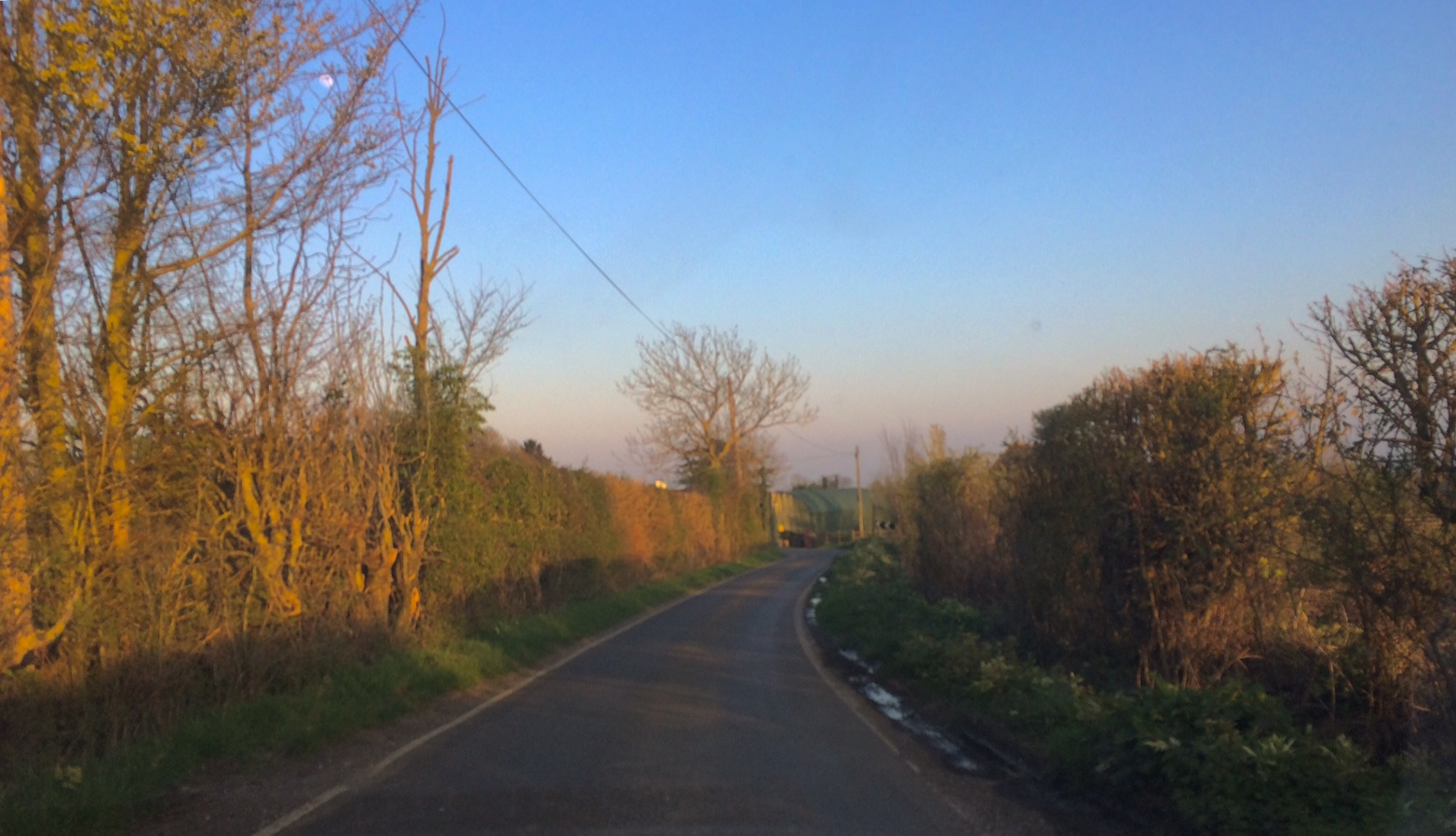
Toot Hill Road towards Clatterford End. The first farm can be seen on the bend.

The Epping Ongar Railway now runs the line. The owner lives in the former station. Passengers on the heritage line can no longer alight at the station, but the train, on occasions stops outside the station to provide an experience of the original journey trains on the line would take. The line and surrounding area featured on a Michael Portillo's Great British Railway Journeys in 2012. The former station is visible from the bridge next to the converted station house.

=== Road ===
The local lanes are narrow and twisting and unsuited to vehicles larger than cars. In addition sections of Toot Hill Road (the road running through the hamlet) are designated as protected lanes. The road joins to Toot Hill opposite the Green Man pub and ends at a T-junction near Greensted. The road is surrounded by forestry, hedges and fields and is only suitable for one car at a time.
