= Toot Hill, Essex =

Village in Essex, England

Coordinates: 51.70059°N 0.19194°E

Toot Hill
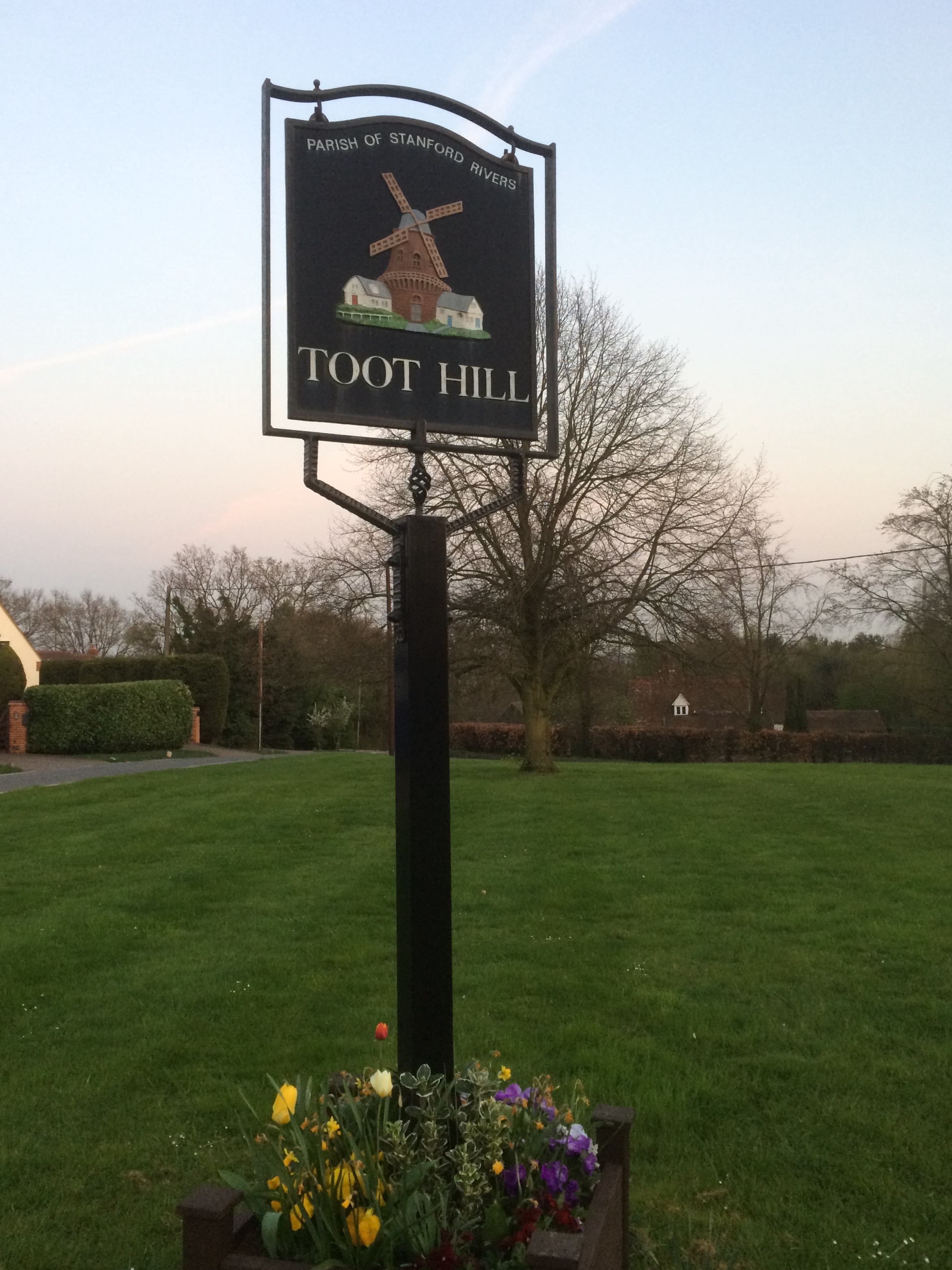
- Toot Hill sign on the common

- Location within Essex
- Population: 817
- OS grid reference: TL515023
- Civil parish: Stanford Rivers
- District: Epping Forest
- Shire county: Essex
- Region: East
- Country: England
- Sovereign state: United Kingdom
- Post town: ONGAR
- Postcode district: CM5
- Dialling code: 01992
- Police: Essex
- Fire: Essex
- Ambulance: East of England
- UK Parliament: Brentwood and Ongar

Toot Hill is a village in the civil parish of Stanford Rivers, in the Epping Forest district of Essex, England. It is 2.3 miles (4 km) south-west of Chipping Ongar and 3.5 miles (6 km) east of Epping. Toot Hill is less than a mile from the small hamlet of Clatterford End.

The Toot Hill Country Show (held a short distance away at Stanford Rivers) has taken place each year since 1953.

== History ==
Toot Hill may originally have been part of the parish of High Ongar, and may have become part of Stanford Rivers about 1280. Like many other settlements in this area Toot Hill is made up mainly of scattered farms and cottages.

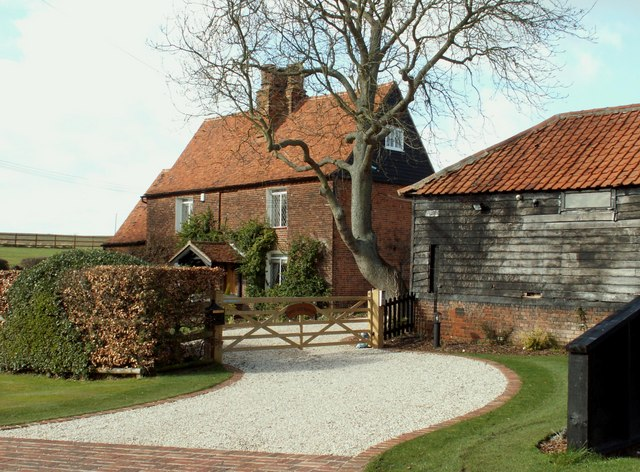
Does Farm in Toot Hill.

Does Farm here is of late 16th-century origin, faced with brickwork in the 19th century. Also at Toot Hill is a small cottage with one gabled cross-wing which may be of the 16th century or earlier.

In or before 1863 a sub-post office was established at Toot Hill. By the 1950s the post office operated inside a village shop, selling basic groceries and newspapers, which were also delivered to customers' homes in Toot Hill and the surrounding hamlets, by the shopkeeper.

There was a windmill at Toot Hill in the 19th century. It was built about 1824. In 1829 it was badly damaged by lightning and the miller was seriously injured. The mill was soon working again and continued to operate until about 1900. It was finally demolished in 1935. It was a wooden post-mill turned by hand. The mill stood on the north side of the road leading to Greensted Green.

The railway from Epping to Chipping Ongar passes less than 1 mile beyond the north of the village. Blake Hall station, important when it was opened principally as a goods yard for transporting agricultural produce from the nearby farms into London. was the closest to Toot Hill, but the goods yard was closed in 1966 and the station was closed to passengers in 1981 (and sold subsequently for residential use). The railway stations at North Weald and Blake Hall were opened when the line to Chipping Ongar was completed in 1865.

In 1921 a village parish room was established to accommodate meetings and events.

After 1945, council houses were gradually built in Toot Hill, particularly the areas on both sides of the Green Man public house. Electricity was supplied in part to the village in early 1951.

== Geography ==
The land in the village varies in height from about 100 ft. above sea-level in the south to over 300 ft. at Toot Hill in the north-west. The River Roding forms the eastern and southern boundaries of the parish. A stream flows east across the north of the parish to join the Roding at Wash Bridge. Several smaller streams join the river farther south. Toot Hill is surrounded by large open fields and arable farms. Some farms include areas dedicated to equestrian development.

It is located 2.3 miles (4 km) south-west of Chipping Ongar and 3.5 miles (6 km) east of Epping. It is in the civil parish of Stanford Rivers. It is close to neighbouring towns and villages such as Greensted Green, Greensted, North Weald, Bobbingworth, Bovinger, Clatterford End, Stanford Rivers, Little End and Chipping Ongar.

== Governance ==
Toot Hill is represented at Westminster by Alex Burghart, MP for Brentwood and Ongar.

In the 2015 local elections the Conservatives won 52% of the vote.

Toot Hill is represented on the Essex County Council under the Ongar & Rural division of the Epping Forest district. In the 2017 county council elections the Conservative candidate won the division seat with 68.2% of the vote, followed by the Liberal Democrats with 12.6%. Further losing candidates were those of Labour and Co-operative, UK Independence Party, and English Democrats whose candidate was Robin Tilbrook. The Conservative candidate held the seat with a swing of +5.5%.

The village of Toot Hill is governed locally by the Stanford Rivers Parish Council, a group of seven parish councilors representing Toot Hill, Clatterford End, Stanford Rivers and Little End. The parish council organises events including the Country Show.

== Culture and community ==
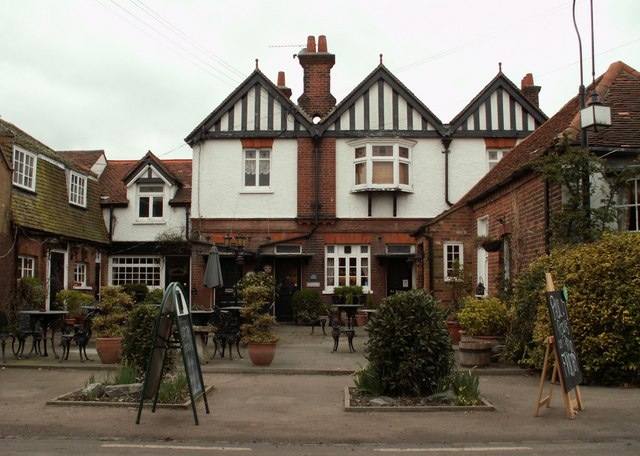
The Green Man public house

The village public house is The Green Man. It burned down in 1896 but was rebuilt in 1907.

Toot Hill's disused phone box has been transformed into an information kiosk with leaflets on attractions in Essex and London, telephone numbers and a map of the local area. Inside is a small stool and table.

The Essex Way footpath runs through Toot Hill from Epping to Harwich.

The Toot Hill Country Show takes place each year on the first Saturday in August. In recent years the show has relocated three miles to the west to a field at Stanford Rivers. In 2023 the show celebrated its 70th year. Attractions include vintage cars, animals, food and ales.

Toot Hill has an 18 hole, Par 70 golf course measuring 6254 yards. Construction of the course started in 1989 and it was open for play in September 1991. The Clubhouse was converted from an original farmhouse.

== Transport ==
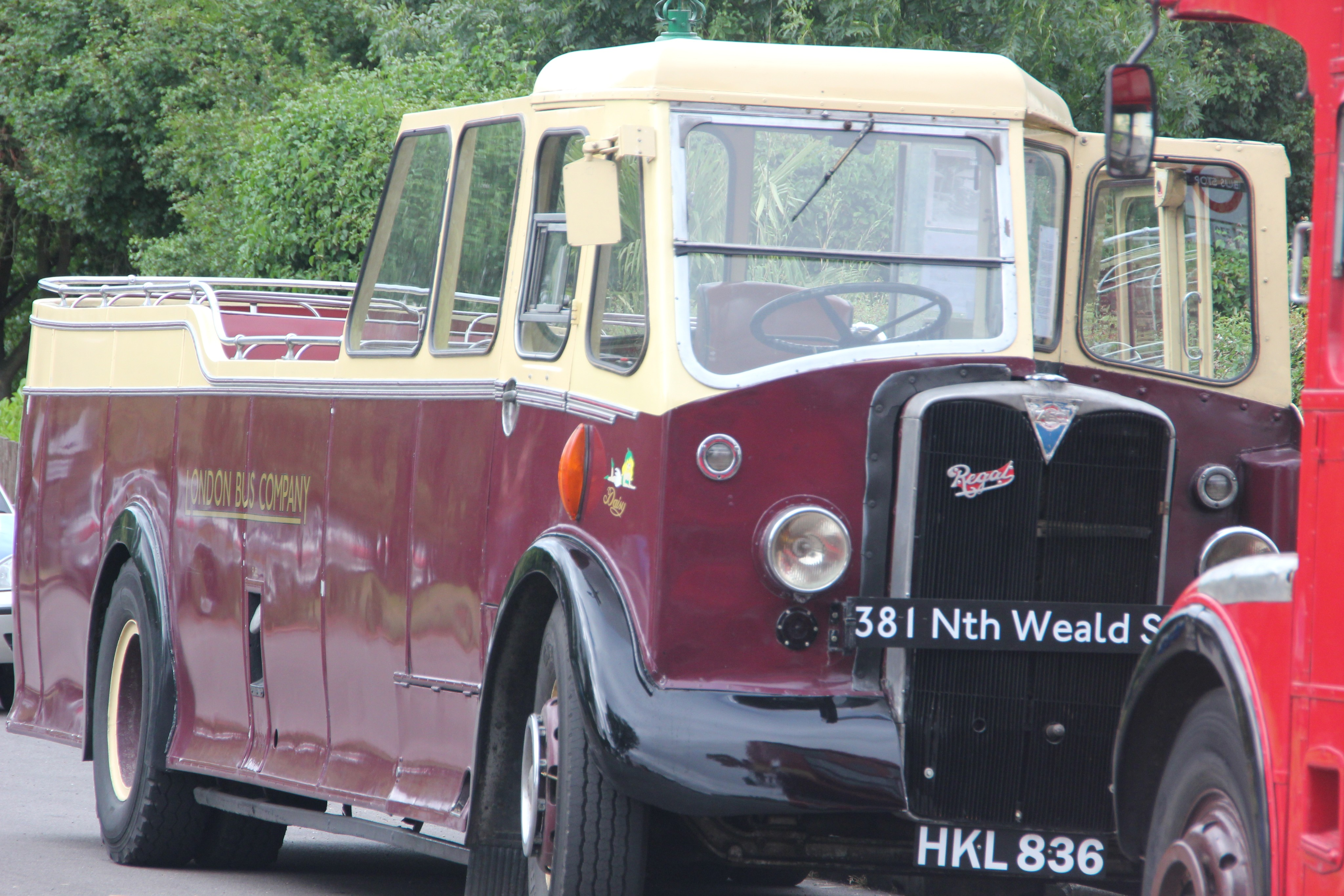
Bus of the Epping Ongar Railway heritage bus route 381 that includes Toot Hill

There are two bus stops in the village. Bus services are provided by Regal Busways and NIBS Buses. Most buses through the village operate from Ongar to Epping, Epping to Harlow or Ongar to Harlow.

The nearest station to Toot Hill is Epping which is served by the Central line. The closest National Rail service is from Harlow Town, which is served by the West Anglia Main Line and is operated by Greater Anglia. Previously, the nearest station was Blake Hall which lies at the north of the parish and 450 yards (400 m) north from Greensted Green in Ongar, between North Weald and Ongar stations.

Two country roads lead into and run through the village: Epping Road and Toot Hill Road. Epping Road leads from Epping and ends opposite the Green Man pub. From then on, the main road is Toot Hill Road which leads to Ongar and connects at two points on Greensted Road.
