= Stanford Rivers =

Village in Essex, England

Coordinates: 51.689528°N 0.207539°E

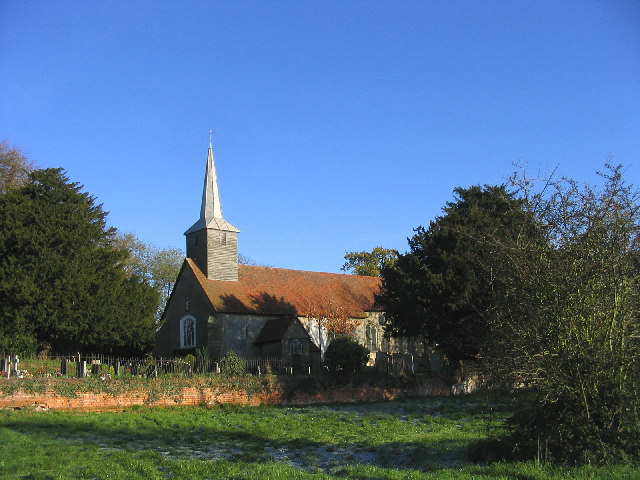
- The Church of St Margaret

- Location within Essex
- Population: 852 (Parish, 2021)
- District: Epping Forest
- Shire county: Essex
- Region: East
- Country: England
- Sovereign state: United Kingdom
- Post town: ONGAR
- Postcode district: CM5
- Dialling code: 01277
- Police: Essex
- Fire: Essex
- Ambulance: East of England
- UK Parliament: Brentwood and Ongar

Stanford Rivers is a village and civil parish in the Epping Forest district of Essex, England. The parish, which is approximately 11 miles (18 km) west from the county town of Chelmsford, contains the village of Toot Hill and the hamlet of Little End, both settlements larger than Stanford Rivers village, and the hamlet of Clatterford End. The village is 2.0 miles (3 km) south-east of Chipping Ongar, 3 miles (5 km) south-west of North Weald Bassett and 3 miles north-west of Kelvedon Hatch. At the 2021 census the parish had a population of 852.

The nearest London Underground station to the village is Epping, 5 miles (8 km) to the west, the terminus of the Central Line. Harlow Town, a National Rail station operated by Greater Anglia, is 8 miles (13 km) to the northwest.

== History ==
According to A Dictionary of British Place Names, the 'Stanford' in Stanford Rivers derives from the Old English for "a stone ford or stony ford". Stanford Rivers is listed in the Domesday Book of 1086 as 'Stanfort', and in 1289 as "Stanford Ryueres", 'Ryueres' being the 13th-century manorial family.

In trade directories Stanford Rivers is described as a parish three miles south from Ongar station on a branch of the London and North Eastern Railway, and seven miles from Brentwood and nineteen from London. The parish, part of the Ongar Hundred, Ongar Rural District, and Ongar petty sessional division, is in the Brentwood county court district.

Population shown in directories for Stanford Rivers parish were in 1851: 1,052; in 1871: 938; in 1881: 975; in 1891: 982; in 1901: 982; in 1911: 864, and in 1931: 758. The populations of 1891, 1901 and 1911 includes the officers and inmates of the Ongar Union workhouse. The workhouse—established in 1836 for poor relief provision set up under the Poor Law Amendment Act 1834—united poor relief for twenty-six nearby villages or parishes. The Ongar workhouse building survives today as a trade and business area in the hamlet of Little End at the southeast of Stanford Rivers parish. Little End dates to at least 1777, when houses were recorded at the settlement.

Recorded area of parish land in 1855 was 4,386 acres (18 km^{2}); in 1874, 4,926 acres (20 km^{2}) with a rateable value of £6,970; in 1882, 4,296 acres with a ratable value of £6,968; in 1894, 4,402 acres (18 km^{2}) of land and 12 acres (50,000 m^{2}) of water with a rateable value of £4,809; in 1902, 4,402 acres of land and 12 of water with a rateable value of £5,007; in 1914, 4,405 acres (18 km^{2}) of land and 9 acres (40,000 m^{2}) of water with a rateable value of £5216; and in 1933, 4,405 of land and 9 of water. Over this period chief crops grown were wheat, barley and beans, on a soil of clay or heavy loam overlaying clay, gravel or sand.

Recorded in 1855 was a National School for boys and girls, which was built in 1850 for 190 children, which in 1882 had an average attendance of 100, in 1894, 146, and in 1902, 152. By 1914 the school had become a Public Elementary School with an average attendance of 125, under the control of the Essex Education (Ongar District) Advisory Sub-committee.

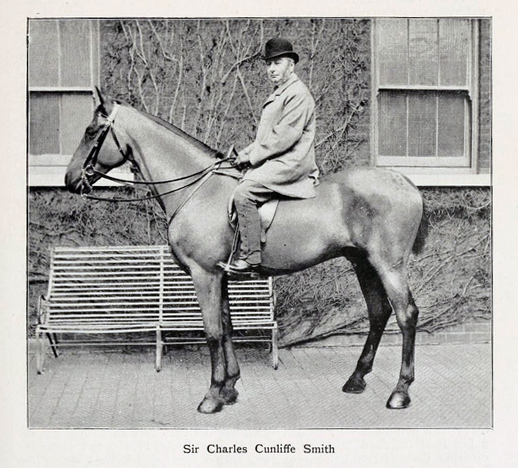
Sir Charles Cunliffe Smith, 3rd Baronet

Notable people and principal landowners in Stanford Rivers were, in 1874 and 1882 Sir Charles Cunliffe Smith, 3rd Baronet (1827–1905); in 1894 Sir Cecil Clementi Smith (1840–1916) who was also lord of the manor, and Capt George Edward Capel Cure; in 1902 Sir Charles Cunliffe Smith again with the now Major George Edward Capel Cure of Blake Hall; in 1914 Sir Drummond Cunliffe Smith, 4th Baronet (1861–1947) of Suttons, Stapleford Tawney who was also lord of the manor, and Major George Edward Capel Cure of Shakenhurst (hall and estate), Cleobury Mortimer. Drummond Cunliffe Smith was still a principal landowner and lord of the manor in 1933. The Smith estate and manor of Suttons in Stapleford Tawney contained 1,384 acres (6 km^{2}) of land in Stanford Rivers. Isaac Taylor (1787–1865), artist, author, and inventor lived at Stanford House at Little End.

Licensees of the White Bear Hotel and the Toot Hill Green Man public house were listed from 1855 to 1933, with that of the Green Man being a baker in 1874, 1882 and 1894. A further listing for a baker was in 1902. Beer retailers were also listed as trading in the parish: two in 1874, one in 1882, and two in all lists from 1894 to 1933.

From 1855 to 1874 there were 18 parish farmers; of those one was also a beer retailer, and another a cattle dealer. By 1882 directories separate out Toot Hill farmers from the rest of the parish, with six at Toot Hill, and seven elsewhere where one was a cattle dealer, and one farmed at Littlebury at the extreme east of the parish. Of the 11 farmers in 1894, two were cattle dealers, and two were at Toot Hill. Of the 15 farmers in 1902, one was also a cattle dealer and land steward to Sir Charles Cunliffe Smith. Of the nine 1902 farmers in Toot Hill, one was also an agricultural implement owner. Of the 15 farmers in 1914, eight were in Toot Hill where one was a poultry farmer. By 1933 there were 19 farmers (eight of whom were at Toot Hill with one there a poultry farmer), and a parish smallholder. There were previously in 1894 and 1902 two poultry dealers, one at Toot Hill.

There were three shopkeepers in 1855, with one also a surveyor of roads; which rose to four in 1874; three in 1882; three in 1894 with one at Toot Hill; two in 1902 and 1914 when there was a Toot Hill grocer who was also a baker; and four in 1933, when there was a grocer who also ran the post office at Toot Hill.

Boot and shoe makers are listed one each for 1855 to 1882, four in 1894, two in 1902, and one in 1914. By 1933 no boot and shoe makers were listed. Blacksmiths are listed from 1855 to 1933, and wheelwrights from 1855 to 1894, but not beyond. There were carpenters in 1855, 1894 (Toot Hill), 1914 and 1933. Bricklayers were trading in 1855 and 1874, and hay carters between 1874 and 1894. Later trade businesses in the early 20th century included Holly Tree Laundry (1914), and an electrical engineers, chimney sweeper and an Egg Grading Station (1933). Millers are listed from 1855 to 1933, particularly a miller (wind) at Toot Hill in 1894, and a miller (steam and water), at Littlebury Mill who was also a farmer (1902 and 1914). Littlebury as a hamlet settlement [surrounding a country house] was listed until at least 1914.

Largely non-manual occupations included a relieving officer and registrar (1855), a registrar of births & deaths & relieving & vaccination officer (1882 and 1894), a head keeper to Charles Cunliffe Smith, and a head gamekeeper of Ongar Park wood (1902 Toot Hill), a sanitary inspector to the Ongar Rural District Council, a land steward (1914 and 1933), and a head [game]keeper (1914 and 1933).

=== Religion ===
From before at least 1855 to beyond at least 1933 the Anglican incumbent's benefice (living) of the ecclesiastical parish with its 52 acres (200,000 m^{2}) of glebe land, application of tithe rent-charge, and attached residence was in the gift of the Chancellor of the Duchy of Lancaster. In 1902 the parish was in the Rural Deanery of Lambourne, in the Archdeaconry of Essex, and the Diocese of St Albans, by 1933 the Rural Deanery of Ongar, in the Achdeaconry of Southend, and the Diocese of Chelmsford. The annual value of the rectory from tithes from 1855 to 1882 was £1,007; in 1894 £776 with net yearly value of £616; reduced in 1902 to a net yearly value of £478, in 1914 was £500, and in 1933, £947. A charity of £400 was established by Mary Rayner in 1871, based on investments in India at 3%, the interest annually distributed in clothing to the poor of the parish.

The Church of St Margaret, of 300 sittings, is of Norman style, with chancel and nave, and a western tower of wood with a spire containing two bells. In south wall of nave is a brass with kneeling lady and six children, with the inscription: " Anne Napper, late the wife of William Nupper, gent., daug of William Shelton." A second brass is to Catherine Mylcaster died 1609, wife to Charles Mylcaeter, to whom she was married for 50 years. Further brasses are one with effigy to Thomas Greville, infant, died 1492, and Robert Barrow died 1503. There are figures of a man in armour and his wife c.1540. The Petres were a significant family in Stanford Rivers and are commemorated by many ledger slabs in chancel. Members of the Stuart family, Earls and Marquisses of Bute were buried here but with the exception of two they have been removed to Roath. The church register dates to 1538.

A Congregational chapel was erected in 1819 at the hamlet of Little End, but destroyed by fire in 1927.

=== Blake Hall station ===
Previously, the nearest railway station was Blake Hall which lies at the north of the parish and 450 yards (400 m) north from Greensted Green in Ongar, between North Weald and Ongar stations. The line was opened by the Great Eastern Railway on 1 April 1865, serving principally as a goods yard carrying agricultural produce from the nearby farms into London. Steam locomotives operated by British Railways for the Underground ran a shuttle service from Epping to Ongar, stopping at Blake Hall, from 1949 until 1957, when the line was electrified and taken over by the Underground's Central line. On 18 April 1966 the goods yard was closed and Blake Hall became a dedicated passenger station. On 17 October 1966, Sunday services were withdrawn.

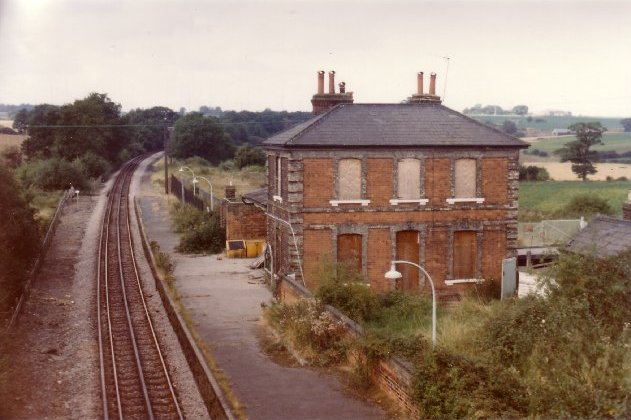
Blake Hall station after it was closed.

London Underground closed the station on 31 October 1981 because of a lack of custom. Some reports state that since the station was situated a considerable distance from any substantial settlement, 17 passengers used it a day, making it the quietest on the entire London Underground network. Although the building remained, the platform was removed by LT when they heard that, despite the formal closure, some trains were still dropping off passengers. The platform has now been reinstated, though the building is now a privately owned house.

The Epping Ongar Railway now runs the line. The owner lives in the former station. Passengers on the heritage line can no longer alight at the station, but the train, on occasions stops outside the station to provide an experience of the original journey trains on the line would take.

Blake Hall station, and the surrounding area featured in an episode of Michael Portillo's Great British Railway Journeys in 2012. Portillo rode a train from Blake Hall to North Weald stations whilst explaining the usage of the line in relevance to the surrounding countryside.

== Governance ==
Stanford Rivers is represented at Westminster by Alex Burghart, the Conservative MP for Brentwood and Ongar.

In the 2015 local elections the Conservatives won 52% of the vote.

Stanford Rivers is represented on the Essex County Council under the Ongar & Rural division of the Epping Forest district. In the 2017 county council elections the Conservative candidate won the division seat with 68.2% of the vote, followed by the Liberal Democrats with 12.6%. Further losing candidates were those of Labour and Co-operative, UK Independence Party, and English Democrats whose candidate was Robin Tilbrook. The Conservative candidate held the seat with a swing of +5.5%.

The parish is governed locally by the Stanford Rivers Parish Council, a group of seven parish councilors representing Stanford Rivers, Toot Hill, Clatterford End, and Little End. The parish council organises events including the Country Show.

== Demography ==
Historical population
Year	Pop.	±%
1801	740	—
1811	700	−5.4%
1821	790	+12.9%
1831	900	+13.9%
1841	965	+7.2%
1851	1,082	+12.1%
1861	1,050	−3.0%
1871	1,000	−4.8%
1881	985	−1.5%
1891	990	+0.5%
1901	905	−8.6%
1911	875	−3.3%
1921	690	−21.1%
1931	755	+9.4%
1941	790	+4.6%
1951	802	+1.5%
1961	836	+4.2%
1971	809	−3.2%
1981	747	−7.7%
1991	779	+4.3%
2001	739	−5.1%
2011	817	+10.6%

The table shows the historical population of Stanford Rivers parish, which includes the settlements of Toot Hill, Little End, Clatterford End and Stanford Rivers.

In 2001, Stanford Rivers parish population was 739: males totalled 375, females 264. The density of the parish's population was 0.42 people per hectare down 0.3 from 1991. The population of 739 lived in 290 houses in the parish, a rise from 273 in 1991. The average household size was 2.55 people, a decrease from 2.9 in 1991.

People aged 45–59 make up the majority of ages in the parish. In 2001, 201 residents were aged 45–59. The total number of over 60s was 209. The total number of under 19s was 184.

Of the population of the parish, the majority lived in houses or bungalows.

The population of white dwellers is significantly high in the parish. The 707 British white residents outnumber the 20 Indian, Pakistani and Roma villagers.

The main stated religion in the parish is Christianity (2001). Those who identified as Christians were 73.8% (564), with nonreligious being 13.9% (103). Those who didn't state their religion at the time of the 2001 census numbered 72.

In 2001, 19 people in the parish of Stanford Rivers were unemployed. At the time, the majority of residents worked in real estate, closely followed by those in the retail industry and construction industry.

== Landmarks ==
There are 90 Grade II listed houses, cottages and structures in Stanford Rivers, and two Grade II*.

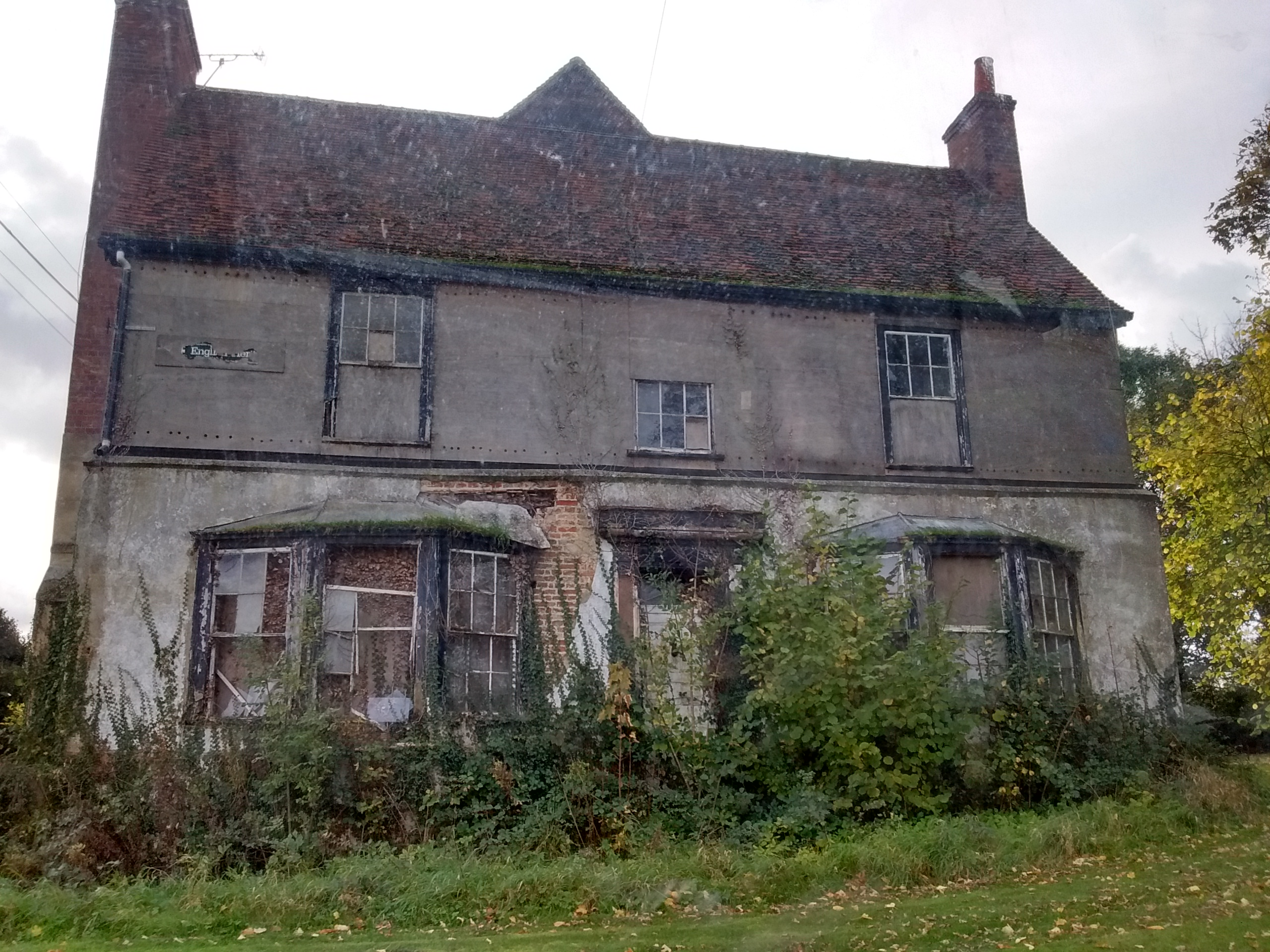
Littlebury

The Grade II* St Margaret of Antioch's Church on School Road is the parish church, dating in parts to the 12th century with 16th to 19th-century additions and fittings, and 16th and 17th-century memorials. Also Grade II* is Littlebury, a previous hall house dating to the early 16th century, 'T' plan two-storey of brick ground floor and timber-framed above. It is at the extreme east of the parish, east off the A113 Romford Road at Littlebury Hall Farm

At 140 yards (100 m) south from Littlebury is Littlebury Mill, a Grade II c.1840 timber-framed and weatherboarded watermill that was later converted to use steam and then electricity.

The Woodman Public House at the south of the parish on London Road is a timber-framed and weatherboarded and gabled building dating to the 17th century; Adjacent to the north of The Woodman is the White Bear, previously The White Bear Hotel until at least 1933, chiefly an 18th and 19th century gabled and brick building.

Stanford Rivers Hall, 40 yards (37 m) north from St Margaret's Church, is a Grade II listed 18th and early 19th-century two-storey red brick house, and the focus for Stanford Hall Farm off Mutton Row. The farm has a farmhouse, outbuildings, a granary and a barn; all listed. On Old Rectory Road 800 yards (700 m) south west of the church is The Old Rectory, a two-storey house with attic dating chiefly to c.1780. On the house is a fire insurance plaque for Central Phoenix Insurance, and at the north of are the remains of a moat. Next to the house is a combined cottage with outbuilding, dating to the 16th century and listed.

=== Farmhouses ===
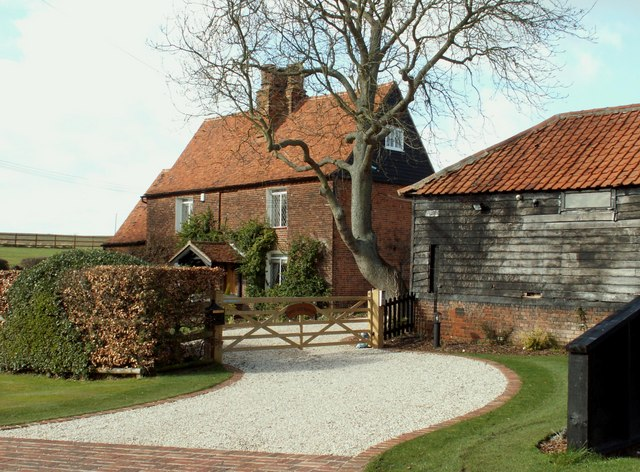
Does Farm

Stanford River Grade II listed farmhouses have attached, variously, Grade II barns, granaries, kennels, cottages and other outbuildings.

Listed farmhouses in Stanford Rivers are Traceys Farmhouse (at the south of the parish), dating to the 17th century, with remains of a moat; Berwick Farmhouse (on Berwick Lane at the south of the parish), dating to the 15th century; Murrells Farmhouse, (at the south of the parish), 16th century or earlier; Cesslands Farmhouse, (west from Stanford Rivers village), late 17th century; Clarks Farmhouse (Mutton Row, north from the village), hall house dating to the 14th century; Newhouse Farmhouse (Mutton Row, north from Clarks Farmhouse), timber-framed and dating to the 16th century or earlier; Colemans Farmhouse (Coleman's Lane, south from Clatterford End), timber-framed and dating to the 16th century or earlier; Burrows Farmhouse (Clatterford End), timber-framed and dating to the 16th century with later external and interior alterations; Stewarts Farmhouse (south from Toot Hill), timber-framed and dating to the 17th century; Blakes Farmhouse (south from Toot Hill), red brick with plastered from and dating to the 18th century; Does Farmhouse (Epping Road, Toot Hill), timber-framed and dating to the 16th century, and brick faced in the 19th; Freemans Farmhouse (Epping Road, Toot Hill), rough rendering over timber framing, and dating to the late 18th and early 19th centuries; Weald Farmhouse (Toot Hill Road, Toot Hill), plaster and pargetting over timber framing, and dating to the 16th and 17th century; Widows Farmhouse (Toot Hill Road, Clatterford End), timber-framed and dating to the 16th century, but clad in red brick c.1840; Steers Farmhouse (Toot Hill), timber framed and plastered, dating to the 17th century with later additions; and Cold Hall Farmhouse (northwest from Toot Hill), timber-framed, plastered and dating to the 17th century or earlier;
