= Fyfield, Essex =

Village in Essex, England

Coordinates: 51.739042°N 0.272169°E

Fyfield
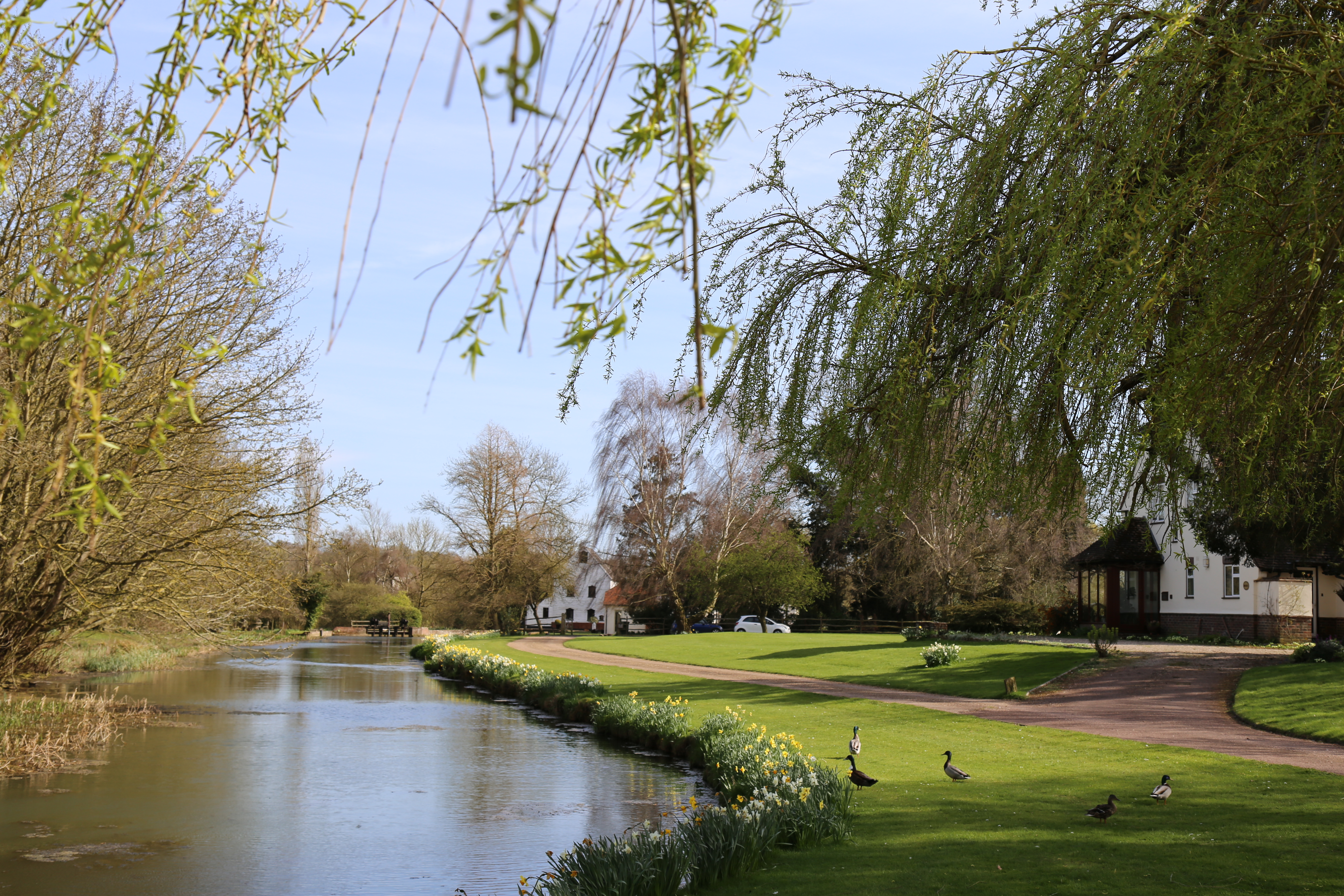
- River Roding millpond below Willingale Road

- Location within Essex
- Population: 795 (Parish, 2021)
- OS grid reference: TL568069
  - London: 20 mi (32 km) SW
- Civil parish: Fyfield
- District: Epping Forest
- Shire county: Essex
- Region: East
- Country: England
- Sovereign state: United Kingdom
- Post town: ONGAR
- Postcode district: CM5
- Dialling code: 01277
- Police: Essex
- Fire: Essex
- Ambulance: East of England
- UK Parliament: Brentwood and Ongar
- Website: fyfield-village.org

Fyfield is a village and civil parish in the Epping Forest district of Essex, England. The village is situated on the B184 road, and approximately 3 miles (5 km) north-east of Chipping Ongar, 7 miles (11 km) east of Harlow and 8 miles (13 km) west of Chelmsford. The parish includes the hamlet of Clatterford End. At the 2021 census the parish had a population of 795.

The River Roding flows south through the village. Fyfield Mill is 180 yards (165 m) below Willingale Road at the south of the village. The watermill, which sits at the head of a mill pond on the River Roding, dates to the late 13th century and is a Grade II listed building.

Fyfield Hall on Willingale Road is the oldest inhabited timber-framed building in England. The house dates chiefly to the mid–13th century, contains an aisled hall dated 1140, and is Grade I listed.
