= Greensted Green =

Hamlet in Essex, England

Coordinates: 51.705°N 0.211°E

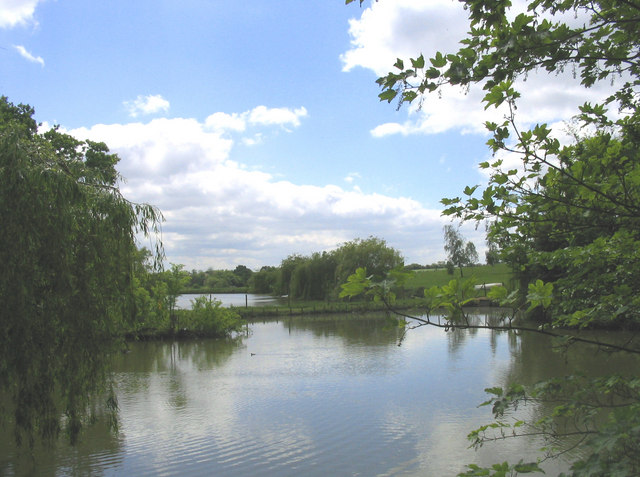
- Fishing lakes in Greensted Green

- Location within Essex
- Civil parish: Ongar
- District: Epping Forest
- Shire county: Essex
- Region: East
- Country: England
- Sovereign state: United Kingdom

Greensted Green is hamlet in the Ongar civil parish of the Epping Forest district, in the English county of Essex. It is at the western end of Greensted, slightly further than 2 miles (4 kilometers) to the west of Chipping Ongar.

== Name origin ==
The "Green" in the name Greensted Green refers to an area directly to the south of the Greensted road and the east of the Toot Hill road which was fenced off for agricultural use, probably towards the end of the nineteenth century. The south western corner of the former green was for many years a marshy area at the confluence of various drainage ditches, but towards the end of the twentieth century it was dug out and extended, to create a small pond for ducks and, especially in winter, geese.
