= Bovinger =

Village in Essex, England

Coordinates: 51.725°N 00.203°E

- Location within Essex
- OS grid reference: TL5205
- Shire county: Essex
- Region: East
- Country: England
- Sovereign state: United Kingdom
- Police: Essex
- Fire: Essex
- Ambulance: East of England

Bovinger /ˈbɒvɪndʒər/ is a village in Essex, England.
