= Clatterford End, High Easter =

Hamlet in Essex, England

Coordinates: 51.796°N 0.344°E

Clatterford End
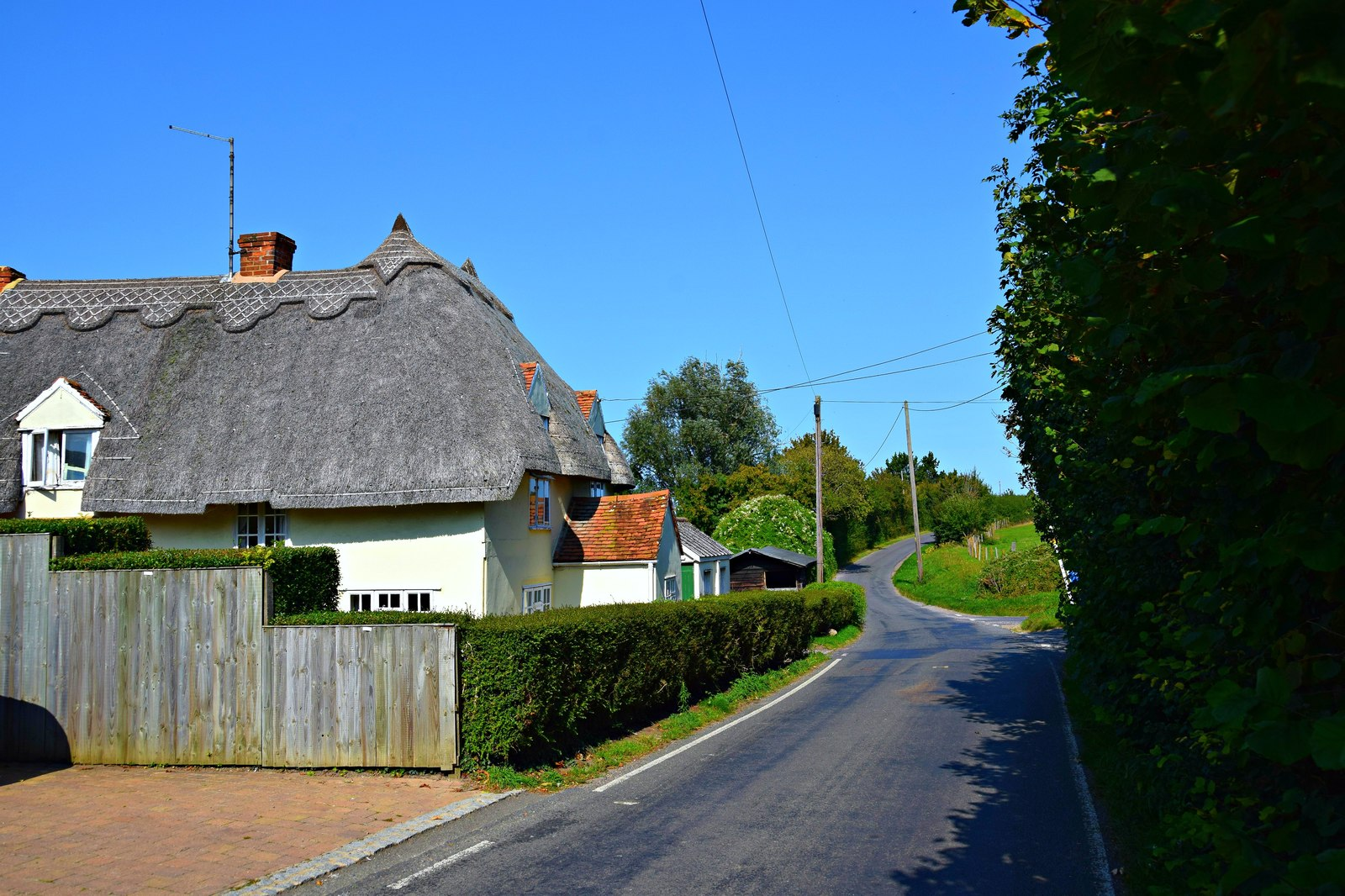

- Location within Essex
- Civil parish: High Easter; Good Easter
- District: Uttlesford; Chelmsford
- Shire county: Essex
- Region: East
- Country: England
- Sovereign state: United Kingdom
- Police: Essex
- Fire: Essex
- Ambulance: East of England

Clatterford End is a hamlet located partly in the High Easter civil parish of the Uttlesford district, and partly in the Good Easter parish of the Chelmsford district, of Essex, England. The hamlet is 1 mile (1.6 km) south of High Easter village, and 6 miles (10 km) northwest of Chelmsford, the county town and city. The hamlet has 5 houses.
