= Clatterford End, Fyfield =

Hamlet in Essex, England

Coordinates: 51.7375°N 0.2648°E

Clatterford End
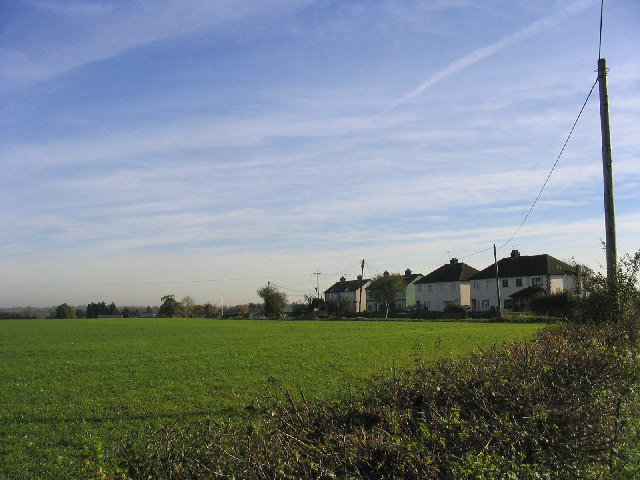

- Location within Essex
- Civil parish: Fyfield
- District: Epping Forest
- Shire county: Essex
- Region: East
- Country: England
- Sovereign state: United Kingdom
- Post town: Ongar
- Police: Essex
- Fire: Essex
- Ambulance: East of England

Clatterford End is a hamlet on the B184 road, just south of the village of Fyfield, in the civil parish of Fyfield, in the Epping Forest district, in the English county of Essex. Its post town is ONGAR.

In the mid 50's, the hamlet mainly consists of a block late 17th or early 18th-century cottages, as well as larger 19th century brick buildings, such as Clatterford Hall and Clatterford House—The later now Grade II listed.
