= 2017 Essex County Council election =

2017 UK local government election

- 4 May 2017

All 75 seats to Essex County Council 38 seats needed for a majority
- Turnout: 31.1% (▲3.3%)

	First party	Second party	Third party
Leader	David Finch	Michael Mackrory	Ivan Henderson
Party	Conservative	Liberal Democrats	Labour
Leader since	May 2013	May 2012	June 2016
Leader's seat	Hedingham	Springfield	Harwich
Last election	42 seats, 34.2%	9 seats, 10.9%	9 seats, 17.4%
Seats before	44	9	8
Seats won	56	7	6
Seat change	▲14	▼2	▼3
Popular vote	184,901	51,524	63,470
Percentage	49.3%	13.7%	16.9%
Swing	▲15.0%	▲2.8%	▼0.5%
	Fourth party	Fifth party	Sixth party
Leader	Dave Blackwell	James Abbott	Chris Pond
Party	CIIP	Green	Loughton Residents
Leader since	May 2013	May 2013	May 2005
Leader's seat	Canvey Island East	Witham Northern	Loughton Central
Last election	1 seat, 0.9%	2 seats, 4.8%	1 seat, 1.1%
Seats before	1	2	1
Seats won	2	1	1
Seat change	▲1	▼1	Steady
Popular vote	3,654	16,074	2,824
Percentage	1.3%	4.3%	0.8%
Swing	▲0.1%	▼0.3%	▼0.3%
	Seventh party
Leader	Nigel Le Gresley
Party	UKIP
Leader since	April 2016
Leader's seat	Wickford Crouch (defeated)
Last election	9 seats, 27.6%
Seats before	6
Seats won	0
Seat change	▼9
Popular vote	29,796
Percentage	7.9%
Swing	▼19.7%
- Map showing the results of the 2017 Essex County Council elections.
Council control before election
Conservative
Council control after election
Conservative

Elections to Essex County Council took place on 4 May 2017 as part of the 2017 local elections. All 75 councillors were elected from 70 electoral divisions, which each returned either one or two councillors by first-past-the-post voting for a four-year term of office.

The electoral divisions were the same as those used at the previous elections in 2009 and 2013. No elections were held in Thurrock or Southend-on-Sea, which are unitary authorities outside the area covered by the County Council.

== Previous composition ==
=== 2013 election ===
Party	Seats
Conservative	42
UKIP	9
Labour	9
Liberal Democrats	9
Green	2
Tendring First	1
Loughton Residents	1
CIIP	1
Independent	1
Total	75

=== Composition of council seats before election ===
Party	Seats
Conservative	44
Liberal Democrats	9
Labour	8
UKIP	6
Green	2
Loughton Residents	1
CIIP	1
R4U	1
Holland Residents	1
Independent	1
Vacant	1
Total	75

=== Changes between elections ===
In between the 2013 election and the 2017 election, the following council seats changed hands:

Division	Date	Previous Party	New Party	Cause	Resulting Council Composition										
Division	Date	Previous Party	New Party	Cause	Con	UKIP	Lab	LDem	Grn	TF	LRes	CInd	Ind	R4U	HRA
Brightlingsea	9 October 2014	UKIP	Conservative	UKIP incumbent resigned. Conservatives won by-election.	43	8	9	9	2	1	1	1	1	0	0
Saffron Walden	14 October 2014	Independent	R4U	New Party Formed.	43	8	9	9	2	1	1	1	0	1	0
Basildon Westley Heights	16 December 2014	UKIP	Independent	Councillor quit party to sit as an independent member.	43	7	9	9	2	1	1	1	1	1	0
Bocking	5 March 2015	UKIP	Conservative	Sitting councillor died. Conservatives won by-election.	44	6	9	9	2	1	1	1	1	1	0
Tendring Rural East	23 March 2016	UKIP	Independent	Councillor quit party to sit as an independent member.	44	5	9	9	2	1	1	1	2	1	0
Clacton East	31 March 2016	Tendring First	Holland Residents	Tendring First incumbent resigned. Holland-on-Sea Residents won by-election.	44	5	9	9	2	0	1	1	2	1	1
Laindon Park and Fryerns	9 June 2016	Labour	UKIP	Sitting councillor died. UKIP won by-election.	44	6	8	9	2	0	1	1	2	1	1
Tendring Rural East	28 July 2016	Independent	Conservative	Sitting councillor joined Conservatives.	45	6	8	9	2	0	1	1	1	1	1
Halstead	5 December 2016	Conservative	Vacant	Sitting councillor died.	44	6	8	9	2	0	1	1	1	1	1

== Summary ==
The election saw the Conservative Party retained overall control of the council, with an increased majority.

== Results ==
2017 Essex County Council election
Party	Seats	Gains	Losses	Net gain/loss	Seats %	Votes %	Votes	+/−
Conservative	56	15	1	+14	74.7	49.3	184,901	+15.0
Labour	6	1	4	−3	8.0	16.9	63,470	−0.5
Liberal Democrats	7	0	2	−2	9.3	13.7	51,524	+2.8
Independent	2	1	0	+1	2.7	1.2	8,171	+1.0
CIIP	2	1	0	+1	2.7	1.0	3,654	+0.1
Green	1	0	1	−1	1.3	4.3	15,187	−0.3
Loughton Residents	1	0	0	Steady	1.3	0.8	2,824	−0.3
UKIP	0	0	9	−9	0.0	7.9	29,796	−19.7
R4U	0	0	1	−1	0.0	1.4	5,231	New
Wickford Independents	0	0	0	Steady	0.0	0.8	2,948	New
Tendring First	0	0	1	Steady	0.0	0.4	1,332	−1.0
BNP	0	0	0	Steady	0.0	0.2	847	−0.1
South Woodham Ferrers Independents	0	0	0	Steady	0.0	0.2	732	0.0
Rayleigh Independents	0	0	0	Steady	0.0	0.2	655	New
English Democrat	0	0	0	Steady	0.0	0.0	58	−0.2
Total	75						372,834	

=== Election of Group Leaders ===
David Finch (Hedingham) was re elected leader of the Conservative Group, with Kevin Bentley (Stanway and Pyefleet) as his deputy.

Michael Mackrory (Springfield) was re elected leader of the Liberal Democratic Group, with Anne Turrell (Mile End and Highwoods) as his deputy.

Ivan Henderson (Harwich) was re elected leader of the Labour Group, with Julie Young (Wivenhoe St Andrew) as his deputy.

Chris Pond (Loughton Central) was elected leader of the Non-Aligned Group with James Abbott (Witham Northern) as his deputy.

=== Election of Leader of the Council ===
David Finch the leader of the Conservative group was duly elected leader of the council and formed a Conservative administration.

== Results by District ==
=== Basildon ===
District Summary

Party	Seats	+/-	Votes	%	+/-
Conservative	6	▲3	31,454	49.0	+16.8
Labour	2	▼1	13,569	21.1	−2.5
Independent	1	▲1	6,299	9.8	+7.8
UKIP	0	▼3	8,327	13.0	−20.4
Liberal Democrat	0	Steady	2,562	5.5	+0.3
Green	0	Steady	701	1.1	−1.6

Division Results

Basildon Westley Heights
Party	Candidate	Votes	%	±%
Independent	Kerry Smith *	3,341	60.6	New
Conservative	Andrew Schrader	1,329	24.1	+1.9
Labour	Jack Ferguson	546	9.9	−10.4
Liberal Democrats	Benjamin Williams	294	5.3	−17.5
Majority		2,012	36.5	+33.5
Turnout		5,522	33.6	+12.5
Independent gain from UKIP		Swing	+31.3	

Billericay & Burstead (2 seats)
Party	Candidate	Votes	%	±%
Conservative	Anthony Hedley *	6,223	69.6	
Conservative	Richard Moore	5,623	62.9	
Labour	Santa Bennett	1,082	12.1	
Liberal Democrats	Darren Kelliher	926	10.4	
Labour	David Kirkman	745	8.3	
Green	Oliver Alexander	701	7.8	
Liberal Democrats	Clare Nice	685	7.7	
UKIP	Kevin Piper	628	7.0	
UKIP	Linda Allport-Hodge	548	6.1	
Majority		4,541	56.8	
Turnout		8,951	32.6	+6.5
Conservative hold		Swing	+5.9	
Conservative hold				

Laindon Park & Fryerns (2 seats)
Party	Candidate	Votes	%	±%
Conservative	Jeff Henry	2,196	35.7	
Labour	Allan Davies	2,154	35.1	
Conservative	Sandra Hillier	2,077	33.8	
Labour	Adele Brown	2,018	32.8	
UKIP	Derrick Fellowes	1,405	22.9	
UKIP	Frank Ferguson *	1,402	22.8	
Liberal Democrats	Elizabeth Grant	317	5.2	
Liberal Democrats	Colin Grant	296	4.8	
Majority		77	1.3	
Turnout		6,153	21.0	+0.3
Conservative gain from UKIP		Swing	+16.5	
Labour hold				

Between 2013 and 2017, UKIP gained the Labour seat in a by-election, however it is shown as a hold as the comparison is made to the last full council election.

Pitsea (2 seats)
Party	Candidate	Votes	%	±%
Conservative	Stephen Hillier	2,654	37.8	
Labour	Patricia Reid	2,605	37.1	
Labour	Paul Bishop	2,452	34.9	
Conservative	Christopher Jackman	2,313	32.9	
UKIP	Simon Breedon	1,372	19.5	
UKIP	Stephen Ward	1,113	15.8	
Liberal Democrats	Martin Howard	351	5.0	
Liberal Democrats	Stephen Nice	303	4.3	
BNP	Paul Borg	161	2.3	New
BNP	Christine Winter	126	1.8	New
Majority		153	2.2	
Turnout		7,037	22.2	+2.2
Conservative gain from Labour		Swing	+10.1	
Labour hold				

Wickford Crouch (2 seats)
Party	Candidate	Votes	%	±%
Conservative	Tony Ball	4,723	55.7	
Conservative	Malcolm Buckley *	4,316	50.9	
Wickford Independents	David Harrison	1,503	17.7	New
Wickford Independents	Eunice Brockman	1,455	17.1	New
Labour	Louise Catling	1,068	12.6	
UKIP	Mark Conroy	1,009	11.9	
Labour	Peter Towler	899	10.6	
UKIP	Anne Marie Waters	850	10.0	
Liberal Democrats	David Radley	390	4.6	
Majority		2,813	33.2	
Turnout		9,783	32.2	+9.5
Conservative hold		Swing	−0.0	
Conservative gain from UKIP				

=== Braintree ===
District Summary

Party	Seats	+/-	Votes	%	+/-
Conservative	7	▲1	18,704	54.8	+17.0
Green	1	Steady	3,527	10.3	+2.2
Labour	0	Steady	6,264	18.3	−3.4
UKIP	0	▼1	2,851	8.3	−19.0
Liberal Democrat	0	Steady	2,792	8.2	+3.7

Division Results

Bocking
Party	Candidate	Votes	%	±%
Conservative	Stephen Canning *	2,143	55.3	+23.1
Labour Co-op	Collette Gibson	992	25.6	−4.3
UKIP	Alan Rees	367	9.5	−23.2
Liberal Democrats	Barry Foskett	218	5.6	+3.4
Green	Poppy Gerrard-Abbott	158	4.1	+1.0
Majority		1,151	29.7	+29.2
Turnout		3,887	27.6	−1.4
Conservative gain from UKIP		Swing	+13.7	

Braintree Eastern
Party	Candidate	Votes	%	±%
Conservative	Robert Mitchell *	2,504	56.8	+16.2
Labour	Moia Thorogood	723	16.4	−3.6
Liberal Democrats	Geoffrey Keig	476	10.8	+6.2
Green	Stephen Hicks	429	9.7	+3.8
UKIP	Norma Huxter	275	6.2	−21.6
Majority		1,781	40.4	+27.6
Turnout		4,412	32.9	+3.5
Conservative hold		Swing	+9.9	

Braintree Town
Party	Candidate	Votes	%	±%
Conservative	Jean Schmitt	1,922	51.4	+18.6
Labour	Colin Riches	1,067	28.6	−3.3
UKIP	Sam Cowie	338	9.0	−18.1
Liberal Democrats	Laura Davies	247	6.6	+3.0
Green	Stephanie Bills	163	4.4	−0.1
Majority		853	22.8	+21.9
Turnout		3,741	26.0	+0.8
Conservative hold		Swing	+11.0	

Halstead
Party	Candidate	Votes	%	±%
Conservative	Jo Beavis	2,604	59.3	+19.7
Labour	Garry Warren	871	19.8	−2.3
UKIP	Anthony Felton	338	7.7	−20.6
Liberal Democrats	Mark Jarman-Howe	324	7.4	+3.3
Green	Jenny Bishop	230	5.2	+0.3
BNP	Paul Hooks	23	0.5	−0.6
Majority		1,733	39.5	+28.3
Turnout		4,396	28.6	+2.2
Conservative hold		Swing	+11.0	

Hedingham
Party	Candidate	Votes	%	±%
Conservative	David Finch *	3,222	64.9	+16.2
Labour Co-op	Bill Edwards	592	11.9	−1.0
Liberal Democrats	Steve Bolter	541	10.9	+2.9
UKIP	David Huxter	371	7.5	−16.9
Green	Dawn Holmes	242	4.9	−0.1
Majority		2,630	52.9	+28.6
Turnout		4,985	34.1	+2.8
Conservative hold		Swing	+8.6	

Three Fields with Great Notley
Party	Candidate	Votes	%	±%
Conservative	Graham Butland *	2,545	63.0	+15.3
Labour	Juliet Walton	486	12.0	−1.7
Liberal Democrats	Graham Sheppard	404	10.0	+5.6
UKIP	Sean Carter	319	7.9	−20.2
Green	Bob Wright	286	7.1	+1.0
Majority		2,059	51.0	+31.4
Turnout		4,041	33.0	+5.3
Conservative hold		Swing	+8.5	

Witham Northern
Party	Candidate	Votes	%	±%
Green	James Abbott *	1,743	37.9	+11.5
Conservative	Tom Cunningham	1,650	35.8	+11.4
Labour Co-op	Philip Barlow	722	15.7	−4.9
UKIP	David Hodges	343	7.5	−17.5
Liberal Democrats	Mark Scott	145	3.2	+0.4
Majority		93	2.0	+0.7
Turnout		4,616	32.6	+0.3
Green hold		Swing	+0.0	

Witham Southern
Party	Candidate	Votes	%	±%
Conservative	Derrick Louis *	2,114	51.1	+13.3
Labour	Antony Gore	811	19.6	−4.0
UKIP	Christopher Darbon	500	12.1	−13.1
Liberal Democrats	Barry Fleet	437	10.6	+4.8
Green	Philip Hughes	276	6.7	+0.5
Majority		1,303	31.5	+18.9
Turnout		4,143	27.0	+1.2
Conservative hold		Swing	+8.7	

=== Brentwood ===
District Summary

Party	Seats	+/-	Votes	%	+/-
Conservative	2	Steady	10,303	53.0	+16.3
Liberal Democrat	2	Steady	6,042	31.1	+5.7
Labour	0	Steady	1,690	8.7	−0.4
Green	0	Steady	713	3.7	+0.7
UKIP	0	Steady	694	3.6	−22.1

Division Results

Brentwood Hutton
Party	Candidate	Votes	%	±%
Conservative	Louise McKinlay	3,533	72.1	+24.1
Liberal Democrats	Dominic Naylor	629	12.8	+4.6
Labour	Emma Benson	502	10.2	+0.0
Green	Alistair Stephen	235	4.8	+1.2
Majority		2,904	59.3	+11.3
Turnout		4,919	32.0	+4.1
Conservative hold		Swing	+9.8	

Brentwood North
Party	Candidate	Votes	%	±%
Liberal Democrats	Barry Aspinell *	2,522	51.0	+7.8
Conservative	John Kerslake	1,746	35.3	+7.9
Labour	Michele Wigram	297	6.0	−0.2
UKIP	Bryan Finegan	270	5.5	−14.8
Green	Wendy Stephen	106	2.1	−0.6
Majority		776	15.7	−0.1
Turnout		4,948	34.5	+4.6
Liberal Democrats hold		Swing	−0.1	

Brentwood Rural
Party	Candidate	Votes	%	±%
Conservative	Lesley Wagland	3,320	65.5	+16.0
Liberal Democrats	Darryl Sankey	804	15.9	+13.0
UKIP	Alison Heales	424	8.4	−29.8
Labour	Tim Barrett	349	6.9	−1.3
Green	Paul Jeater	174	3.4	+0.4
Majority		2,516	49.6	+39.5
Turnout		5,075	35.2	+6.1
Conservative hold		Swing	+1.5	

Brentwood South
Party	Candidate	Votes	%	±%
Liberal Democrats	David Kendall *	2,087	46.1	+7.2
Conservative	Andy Wiles	1,704	37.6	+10.9
Labour	Gareth Barrett	542	12.0	−0.8
Green	John Hamilton	198	4.4	+1.8
Majority		383	8.5	−3.7
Turnout		4,545	30.6	+2.1
Liberal Democrats hold		Swing	−1.9	

=== Castle Point ===
District Summary

Party	Seats	+/-	Votes	%	+/-
Conservative	3	▲1	10,990	54.2	+20.8
CIIP	2	▲1	3,654	18.0	+3.5
Labour	0	Steady	2,635	13.0	−0.4
UKIP	0	▼2	2,286	11.3	−22.4
Liberal Democrat	0	Steady	506	2.5	+0.9
Green	0	Steady	214	1.1	−0.2

Division Results

Canvey Island East
Party	Candidate	Votes	%	±%
CIIP	Dave Blackwell *	1,976	47.3	+3.0
Conservative	Chas Mumford	1,359	32.5	+17.0
UKIP	Sam Aubrey	482	11.5	−17.2
Labour	Maggie McArthur-Curtis	319	7.6	−1.3
Liberal Democrats	Paul Chaplin	46	1.1	+0.5
Majority		617	14.8	−0.8
Turnout		4,381	29.0	+2.6
CIIP hold		Swing	−7.0	

Canvey Island West
Party	Candidate	Votes	%	±%
CIIP	Peter May	1,678	49.8	+21.2
Conservative	Jay Blissett	1,342	39.8	+2.7
Labour	Jackie Reilly	336	10.0	+2.1
Liberal Democrats	Ian Gale	15	0.4	−0.3
Majority		336	10.0	+1.5
Turnout		3,371	24.6	−1.7
CIIP gain from Conservative		Swing	+9.2	

Hadleigh
Party	Candidate	Votes	%	±%
Conservative	Jill Reeves *	3,063	66.2	+21.5
UKIP	Brian Lee	560	12.1	−21.5
Labour	Lee Dorrington	550	11.9	−0.6
Liberal Democrats	Geoff Duff	241	5.2	+2.1
Green	Douglas Copping	214	4.6	−1.4
Majority		2,503	54.1	+43.0
Turnout		4,636	33.0	+3.0
Conservative hold		Swing	+21.5	

South Benfleet
Party	Candidate	Votes	%	±%
Conservative	Andrew Sheldon	2,820	64.4	+28.4
UKIP	Alan Bayley *	711	16.2	−25.7
Labour	Jack Rawlings	644	14.7	−4.4
Liberal Democrats	Francesca Sawle	202	4.6	+2.5
Majority		2,109	48.2	+42.3
Turnout		4,386	32.6	+1.4
Conservative gain from UKIP		Swing	+27.0	

Thundersley
Party	Candidate	Votes	%	±%
Conservative	Beverly Egan	2,406	64.6	+31.0
Labour	Joe Cooke	786	21.1	+2.5
UKIP	Sharon Ainsley	533	14.3	−25.5
Majority		1,620	43.5	+37.3
Turnout		3,733	30.5	+2.8
Conservative gain from UKIP		Swing	+28.2	

=== Chelmsford ===
District Summary

Party	Seats	+/-	Votes	%	+/-
Conservative	6	Steady	20,220	44.0	+11.4
Liberal Democrat	3	Steady	11,817	25.7	+6.4
Labour	0	Steady	4,058	8.8	−1.6
UKIP	0	Steady	2,235	4.9	−18.5
Independent	0	Steady	1,786	3.9	+2.0
Green	0	Steady	1,372	3.0	-0.7

Division Results

Broomfield & Writtle
Party	Candidate	Votes	%	±%
Conservative	John Aldridge *	2,916	54.2	+10.4
Independent	Wendy Daden	959	17.8	New
Liberal Democrats	Julia Frascona	894	16.6	+4.0
Labour	Connor Woolner	423	7.9	−0.7
Green	Reza Hossain	184	3.4	−0.7
Majority		1,957	36.4	+22.3
Turnout		5,387	35.9	+5.9
Conservative hold		Swing	−3.7	

Chelmer
Party	Candidate	Votes	%	±%
Conservative	John Spence *	3,184	64.3	+15.3
Liberal Democrats	Natacha Dudley	746	15.1	+4.8
Labour	Sandra Massey	471	9.5	−1.7
UKIP	Jesse Pryke	316	6.4	−18.3
Green	Colin Budgey	237	4.8	−0.1
Majority		2,438	49.2	+24.9
Turnout		4,960	30.6	+5.1
Conservative hold		Swing	+5.2	

Chelmsford Central
Party	Candidate	Votes	%	±%
Conservative	Dick Madden *	1,823	42.5	+6.7
Liberal Democrats	Marie Goldman	1,617	37.7	+11.7
Labour	Edward Massey	506	11.8	−0.7
UKIP	John Theedom	180	4.2	−16.5
Green	Tony Lane	165	3.8	−1.3
Majority		206	4.8	−5.0
Turnout		4,292	33.3	+5.1
Conservative hold		Swing	−2.5	

Chelmsford North
Party	Candidate	Votes	%	±%
Liberal Democrats	Stephen Robinson *	2,194	47.0	+9.6
Conservative	Mike Holoway	1,635	35.0	+13.0
Labour	David Howell	466	10.0	−4.9
UKIP	Thomas Jones	243	5.2	−16.3
Green	Keith Wiffen	131	2.8	−1.4
Majority		559	12.0	−3.4
Turnout		4,676	34.3	+5.2
Liberal Democrats hold		Swing	−1.7	

Chelmsford West
Party	Candidate	Votes	%	±%
Liberal Democrats	Jude Deakin *	1,735	39.1	+10.5
Conservative	Graham Seeley	1,534	34.6	+8.7
Labour Co-op	Richard Hyland	757	17.1	+2.2
UKIP	Nigel Carter	284	6.4	−18.9
Green	Natalie Seaman	129	2.9	−0.4
Majority		201	4.5	+1.7
Turnout		4,450	29.7	+3.8
Liberal Democrats hold		Swing	+0.9	

Great Baddow
Party	Candidate	Votes	%	±%
Conservative	Jenny Chandler *	2,306	46.7	+15.5
Liberal Democrats	Chris Shaw	1,718	34.8	+9.0
Labour	Chris Vince	422	8.5	−1.7
UKIP	Jeanette Howes	360	7.3	−22.3
Green	Liz Carlton	134	2.7	−0.6
Majority		588	11.9	+10.3
Turnout		4,939	31.3	+2.0
Conservative hold		Swing	+3.3	

South Woodham Ferrers
Party	Candidate	Votes	%	±%
Conservative	Bob Massey	1,554	45.7	+11.9
SWFCTA	Jackie Birch	732	21.5	−7.1
UKIP	Kyle Jannece	566	16.6	−4.5
Labour	Mike Robertson	185	5.4	−5.5
Liberal Democrats	Noel Sutcliffe	142	4.2	+0.6
Independent	Chris Cheater	117	3.4	New
Green	David Rey	106	3.1	+1.2
Majority		822	24.2	+19.1
Turnout		3,417	27.3	+6.6
Conservative hold		Swing	+9.5	

Springfield
Party	Candidate	Votes	%	±%
Liberal Democrats	Mike Mackrory *	2,464	46.1	+10.6
Conservative	Jean Murray	1,991	37.2	+7.9
Labour	Russell Kennedy	480	9.0	−1.4
UKIP	Mark Gough	286	5.3	−14.6
Green	Angela Thompson	126	2.4	−2.4
Majority		473	8.8	+2.7
Turnout		5,353	33.9	+2.2
Liberal Democrats hold		Swing	+1.4	

Stock
Party	Candidate	Votes	%	±%
Conservative	Ian Grundy *	3,277	68.2	+19.9
Independent	Paul Clark	710	14.8	New
Labour	Elaine Baldwin	348	7.2	−1.1
Liberal Democrats	Tom Willis	307	6.4	+2.3
Green	Steve Betteridge	160	3.3	−0.7
Majority		2,567	53.5	+40.4
Turnout		4,824	33.8	+3.0
Conservative hold		Swing	+2.6	

=== Colchester ===
District Summary

Party	Seats	+/-	Votes	%	+/-
Conservative	4	Steady	18,568	42.3	+12.8
Labour	3	▲1	9,078	20.7	+0.8
Liberal Democrat	2	▼1	10,646	24.2	+2.7
Green	0	Steady	2,402	5.5	−1.2
UKIP	0	Steady	1,869	4.3	−16.2
Independent	0	Steady	1,373	3.1	New

Division Results

Abbey
Party	Candidate	Votes	%	±%
Labour	Lee Scordis	1,624	32.1	+17.0
Liberal Democrats	Lyn Barton	1,469	29.0	−8.0
Conservative	Daniel Ellis	1,290	25.5	+14.0
Green	Mark Goacher	466	9.2	−4.4
UKIP	Ron Levy	218	4.3	−18.5
Majority		155	3.1	−11.1
Turnout		5,074	29.2	+8.1
Labour gain from Liberal Democrats		Swing	+12.5	

Constable
Party	Candidate	Votes	%	±%
Conservative	Anne Brown *	3,688	68.6	+24.8
Liberal Democrats	Thomas Stevenson	725	13.5	+7.1
Labour	Ian Yates	552	10.3	−0.4
Green	Blake Roberts	413	7.7	−0.5
Majority		2,963	55.1	+42.4
Turnout		5,393	36.2	+4.6
Conservative hold		Swing	+8.9	

Drury
Party	Candidate	Votes	%	±%
Conservative	Sue Lissimore *	3,330	58.3	+18.2
Liberal Democrats	William Glanville	1,279	22.4	−0.7
Labour	Sioux Blair-Jordan	594	10.4	−0.4
Green	Robbie Spence	303	5.3	−1.1
UKIP	Diane Baker	202	3.5	−16.0
Majority		2,051	35.9	+18.9
Turnout		5,714	41.1	+5.7
Conservative hold		Swing	+9.5	

Maypole
Party	Candidate	Votes	%	±%
Labour	Dave Harris *	2,178	51.5	+7.5
Conservative	Pauline Hazell	1,166	27.6	+15.0
Liberal Democrats	Martin Goss	600	14.2	−10.4
UKIP	Bruno Hickman	192	4.5	−10.6
Green	Laura Pountney	96	2.3	−1.5
Majority		1,012	23.9	+4.6
Turnout		4,237	28.3	+1.4
Labour hold		Swing	−3.7	

Mersea & Tiptree
Party	Candidate	Votes	%	±%
Conservative	John Jowers *	2,555	49.0	+2.0
Independent	John Akker	1,058	20.3	New
Labour	Bry Mogridge	533	10.2	−5.2
UKIP	David Broise	474	9.1	−18.8
Liberal Democrats	Jo Hayes	317	6.1	+1.6
Green	Peter Banks	281	5.4	+0.1
Majority		1,497	28.7	+9.6
Turnout		5,227	36.4	+8.4
Conservative hold		Swing	−9.1	

Mile End & Highwoods
Party	Candidate	Votes	%	±%
Liberal Democrats	Anne Turrell *	2,104	46.5	+7.3
Conservative	Thomas Rowe	1,549	34.2	+9.7
Labour	Michael Wagstaff	464	10.3	−1.0
Green	Amanda Kirke	207	4.6	−0.4
UKIP	Alex Knupffer	200	4.4	−15.6
Majority		555	12.3	−2.3
Turnout		4,534	29.5	+5.2
Liberal Democrats hold		Swing	−1.2	

Parsons Heath & East Gates
Party	Candidate	Votes	%	±%
Liberal Democrats	John Baker	1,885	43.3	+6.7
Conservative	Darius Laws	1,486	34.1	+16.4
Labour	Judy Short	514	11.8	−2.4
UKIP	Jason Berry	294	6.7	−19.2
Green	Robert Brannan	179	4.1	−1.5
Majority		399	9.2	−1.5
Turnout		4,365	34.6	+8.2
Liberal Democrats hold		Swing	−4.9	

Stanway & Pyefleet
Party	Candidate	Votes	%	±%
Conservative	Kevin Bentley *	2,842	54.9	+14.1
Liberal Democrats	Jessica Scott-Boutell	1,190	23.0	+3.4
Labour	Alan Mogridge	565	10.9	−0.7
UKIP	John Pitts	289	5.6	−16.4
Green	Susan Allen	287	5.5	−0.4
Majority		1,652	31.9	+13.1
Turnout		5,181	35.7	+6.2
Conservative hold		Swing	+5.4	

Wivenhoe St. Andrew
Party	Candidate	Votes	%	±%
Labour	Julie Young *	2,054	48.0	−3.4
Liberal Democrats	Mark Cory	1,077	25.2	+14.8
Conservative	Michael McDonnell	662	15.5	+0.2
Independent	Chris Hill	315	7.4	New
Green	Janita Le Fevre	170	4.0	−2.8
Majority		977	22.8	−12.4
Turnout		4,279	36.6	+10.0
Labour hold		Swing	−9.1	

=== Epping Forest ===
District Summary

Party	Seats	+/-	Votes	%	+/-
Conservative	6	▲1	15,695	55.1	+19.1
Loughton Residents	1	Steady	2,824	9.9	−3.4
Liberal Democrat	0	▼1	4,445	15.6	+5.7
Labour	0	Steady	3,071	10.8	+2.3
Green	0	Steady	1,418	5.0	+0.7
UKIP	0	Steady	994	3.5	−23.2
English Democrat	0	Steady	58	0.2	−0.2

Division Results

Buckhurst Hill & Loughton South
Party	Candidate	Votes	%	±%
Conservative	Valerie Metcalfe *	2,742	56.5	+20.7
Green	Simon Heap	1,093	22.5	+15.3
Liberal Democrats	Joseph Barkham	549	11.3	+5.9
Labour	Jason Phillips	466	9.6	+1.8
Majority		1,649	34.0	+22.0
Turnout		4,872	30.3	+3.3
Conservative hold		Swing	+2.7	

Chigwell & Loughton Broadway
Party	Candidate	Votes	%	±%
Conservative	Gagan Mohindra	2,033	65.7	+27.7
Liberal Democrats	Joanne Alexander-Sefre	545	17.6	+14.5
Labour	Mich Diamond-Conway	518	16.7	+6.2
Majority		1,488	48.0	+42.6
Turnout		3,120	22.4	+0.1
Conservative hold		Swing	+6.6	

Epping & Theydon Bois
Party	Candidate	Votes	%	±%
Conservative	Christopher Whitbread	2,419	45.5	+16.6
Liberal Democrats	Jon Whitehouse *	2,275	42.8	+5.0
Labour	Simon Bullough	353	6.6	+1.2
UKIP	Barry Johns	264	5.0	−19.4
Majority		144	2.7	−6.2
Turnout		5,319	38.7	+5.7
Conservative gain from Liberal Democrats		Swing	+5.8	

Loughton Central
Party	Candidate	Votes	%	±%
Loughton Residents	Chris Pond *	2,824	69.3	+8.6
Conservative	Jonathan Hunter	801	19.7	+7.5
Labour	Angela Ayre	328	8.1	New
Liberal Democrats	Paul Rissbrook	121	3.0	+0.7
Majority		2,023	49.7	+8.2
Turnout		4,080	28.8	+5.7
Loughton Residents hold		Swing	+0.5	

North Weald & Nazeing
Party	Candidate	Votes	%	±%
Conservative	Anthony Jackson *	3,081	78.5	+30.9
Labour	Stefan Mullard	500	12.7	+0.7
Liberal Democrats	Arnold Verrall	346	8.8	+6.4
Majority		2,581	65.7	+51.5
Turnout		3,953	27.4	+2.7
Conservative hold		Swing	+15.1	

Ongar & Rural
Party	Candidate	Votes	%	±%
Conservative	Maggie McEwen *	2,336	68.2	+17.3
Liberal Democrats	Brian Surtees	432	12.6	+6.2
Labour Co-op	Liam Preston	316	9.2	−0.2
UKIP	Lawrence Mendoza	282	8.2	−17.3
English Democrat	Robin Tilbrook	58	1.7	−1.5
Majority		1,904	55.6	+30.1
Turnout		3,429	27.7	+3.4
Conservative hold		Swing	+5.5	

Waltham Abbey
Party	Candidate	Votes	%	±%
Conservative	Ricki Gadsby *	2,283	59.7	+19.0
Labour	Robert Greyson	590	15.4	+0.5
UKIP	Ron McEvoy	448	11.7	−24.4
Green	Dave Plummer	325	8.5	+5.9
Liberal Democrats	Timothy Vaughan	177	4.6	+1.7
Majority		1,693	44.3	+39.7
Turnout		3,833	22.8	+2.3
Conservative hold		Swing	+9.2	

=== Harlow ===
District Summary

Party	Seats	+/-	Votes	%	+/-
Conservative	4	▲3	12,722	50.5	+23.9
Labour	0	▼3	10,303	40.9	+4.4
Liberal Democrat	0	Steady	1,217	4.8	+1.2
Green	0	Steady	966	3.8	+0.9

Division Results

Harlow North
Party	Candidate	Votes	%	±%
Conservative	Michael Garnett	2,512	51.0	+23.2
Labour	Michael Danvers *	2,036	41.3	+4.3
Liberal Democrats	Lesley Rideout	379	7.7	+3.1
Majority		476	9.7	+0.5
Turnout		4,927	29.1	+2.5
Conservative gain from Labour		Swing	+9.4	

Harlow South East
Party	Candidate	Votes	%	±%
Conservative	Eddie Johnson *	2,468	58.0	+25.5
Labour	Eugenie Harvey	1,495	35.1	+3.1
Liberal Democrats	Christopher Robins	293	6.9	+3.7
Majority		973	22.9	+22.4
Turnout		4,256	28.7	+1.3
Conservative hold		Swing	+11.2	

Harlow West (2 seats)
Party	Candidate	Votes	%	±%
Conservative	Michael Hardware	3,940	46.7	
Conservative	Clive Souter	3,802	45.1	
Labour	Karen Clempner *	3,457	41.0	
Labour	Tony Durcan *	3,315	39.3	
Green	Hannah Clare	561	6.7	
Green	James Aicken	405	4.8	
Liberal Democrats	Christopher Millington	297	3.5	
Liberal Democrats	Robert Thurston	248	2.9	
Majority		345	4.1	
Turnout		16,025	28.3	+4.5
Conservative gain from Labour		Swing	+8.8	
Conservative gain from Labour				

=== Maldon ===
District Summary

Party	Seats	+/-	Votes	%	+/-
Conservative	3	Steady	8,400	53.7	+9.2
Labour	0	Steady	1,753	11.2	−3.6
UKIP	0	Steady	1,514	9.7	−19.8
Independent	0	Steady	1,498	9.6	New
Liberal Democrat	0	Steady	1,210	7.7	New
Green	0	Steady	731	4.7	−3.8
BNP	0	Steady	537	3.4	+0.6

Division Results

Heybridge & Tollesbury
Party	Candidate	Votes	%	±%
Conservative	Mark Durham	2,965	57.9	+11.6
Labour	Keith Miller	547	10.7	−5.9
UKIP	Andrew Francis	450	8.8	−15.4
Liberal Democrats	Richard Lee	434	8.5	New
BNP	Richard Perry	422	8.2	+3.6
Green	Edwyn Gerrard-Abbott	304	6.0	−2.5
Majority		2,418	47.2	+26.1
Turnout		5,122	31.5	+0.4
Conservative hold		Swing	+8.7	

Maldon
Party	Candidate	Votes	%	±%
Conservative	Penny Channer *	2,865	60.3	+12.6
Labour	Lee Rigby	680	14.3	+0.6
Liberal Democrats	Neil Babbage	533	11.2	New
UKIP	Tim Drain	310	6.5	−18.3
Green	Benjamin Finn	246	5.2	−6.0
BNP	Trevor Cable	115	2.4	+0.3
Majority		2,185	46.0	+23.4
Turnout		4,749	31.8	+3.1
Conservative hold		Swing	+6.0	

Southminster
Party	Candidate	Votes	%	±%
Conservative	Ron Pratt	2,570	44.5	+4.7
Independent	Wendy Stamp	1,498	26.0	New
UKIP	Beverly Acevedo	754	13.1	−25.8
Labour	Leslie McDonald	526	9.1	−4.8
Liberal Democrats	Ray Kay	243	4.2	New
Green	Peter Lote	181	3.1	−2.9
Majority		1,072	18.5	+17.7
Turnout		5,772	31.7	+5.5
Conservative hold		Swing	−10.6	

=== Rochford ===
District Summary

Party	Seats	+/-	Votes	%	+/-
Conservative	5	▲2	10,073	46.7	+11.7
UKIP	0	▼1	2,700	12.5	−15.7
Labour	0	Steady	2,318	10.7	−2.4
Liberal Democrat	0	Steady	2,275	10.5	−0.8
Green	0	▼1	1,996	9.2	+0.4
Rochford Residents	0	Steady	1,400	6.5	New
Rayleigh Independents	0	Steady	655	3.0	New
Independent	0	Steady	173	0.8	New

Division Results

Rayleigh North
Party	Candidate	Votes	%	±%
Conservative	Malcolm Maddocks *	2,122	44.7	+12.3
Liberal Democrats	Christopher Black	1,462	30.8	+5.6
UKIP	John Hayter	835	17.6	−2.6
Labour	Roger Neville	331	7.0	+0.7
Majority		660	13.9	+6.7
Turnout		4,800	36.7	+5.7
Conservative hold		Swing	+3.4	

Rayleigh South
Party	Candidate	Votes	%	±%
Conservative	June Lumley	2,090	50.3	+15.8
Rayleigh Independents	Jamie Burton	655	15.8	New
Liberal Democrats	Christopher Stanley	495	11.9	−4.3
UKIP	Keith Gibbs *	459	11.0	−28.7
Labour	Samantha Reed	328	7.9	−1.7
Green	Andrew Strutt	132	3.2	New
Majority		1,435	34.5	+29.2
Turnout		4,164	32.5	+5.7
Conservative gain from UKIP		Swing	+22.3	

Rochford North
Party	Candidate	Votes	%	±%
Conservative	Terry Cutmore *	1,897	44.6	+2.0
Rochford Resident	John Mason	1,400	32.9	New
Labour	David Lench	403	9.5	−3.5
UKIP	Nicholas Cooper	402	9.5	−26.4
Liberal Democrats	Daniel Irlam	148	3.5	−5.1
Majority		497	11.7	+4.9
Turnout		4,255	31.8	+5.7
Conservative hold		Swing	−15.5	

Rochford South
Party	Candidate	Votes	%	±%
Conservative	Mike Steptoe	1,683	45.6	+9.2
Labour	Mark Daniels	870	23.6	−10.1
UKIP	Neil Hookway	668	18.1	−8.9
Independent	Robert Green	173	4.7	New
Liberal Democrats	Tracy Arnold	170	4.6	+1.6
Green	Simon Cross	128	3.5	New
Majority		813	22.0	+19.3
Turnout		3,701	29.7	+5.7
Conservative hold		Swing	+9.7	

Rochford West
Party	Candidate	Votes	%	±%
Conservative	Carole Weston	2,281	48.1	+17.6
Green	Michael Hoy *	1,736	36.6	−1.9
Labour	David Flack	386	8.1	−0.1
UKIP	Tina Hughes	336	7.1	−13.9
Majority		545	11.5	+3.5
Turnout		4,739	34.0	+4.2
Conservative gain from Green		Swing	+9.8	

=== Tendring ===
District Summary

Party	Seats	+/-	Votes	%	+/-
Conservative	6	▲2	16,888	46.2	+15.7
Labour	1	Steady	7,024	19.2	+2.8
Independent	1	▲1	1,906	5.2	New
UKIP	0	▼2	5,361	14.7	−14.3
Liberal Democrat	0	Steady	2,734	7.5	−0.4
Tendring First	0	▼1	1,332	3.6	−8.5
Green	0	Steady	1,272	3.5	+0.3

Division Results

Brightlingsea
Party	Candidate	Votes	%	±%
Conservative	Alan Goggin *	2,490	47.5	+22.9
Liberal Democrats	Gary Scott	1,318	25.1	−1.8
Labour	Frank Belgrove	628	12.0	−0.5
UKIP	Ben Smith	602	11.5	−18.9
Green	Bev Maltby	205	3.9	+0.4
Majority		1,172	22.4	+18.8
Turnout		5,253	35.7	+3.5
Conservative gain from UKIP		Swing	+20.9	

Clacton East
Party	Candidate	Votes	%	±%
Independent	Colin Sargeant *	1,906	40.9	New
Conservative	Chris Amos	1,458	31.3	+4.4
UKIP	Mark Stephenson	705	15.1	−9.7
Labour	Robert Porter	440	9.4	−1.3
Liberal Democrats	Kane Silver	82	1.8	+0.0
Green	Sally McAtter	74	1.6	+0.0
Majority		448	9.6	+2.1
Turnout		4,678	35.8	+2.1
Independent gain from Tendring First		Swing	+18.2	

Between 2013 and 2017, the seat was won by the Independent candidate in a by-election, however it is shown as a gain as it is compared to the previous full council election.

Clacton North
Party	Candidate	Votes	%	±%
Conservative	Andy Wood *	1,639	49.9	+20.6
Labour Co-op	Samantha Atkinson	725	22.1	−2.8
UKIP	Andrew Pemberton	724	22.0	−2.9
Liberal Democrats	Barrie Coker	125	3.8	−2.2
Green	David Davis	73	2.2	−0.2
Majority		914	27.8	+23.4
Turnout		3,292	25.7	+1.5
Conservative hold		Swing	+11.7	

Clacton West
Party	Candidate	Votes	%	±%
Conservative	Paul Honeywood *	1,805	51.0	+12.8
Labour Co-op	Dan Casey	874	24.7	+4.2
UKIP	Roy Raby	619	17.5	−14.0
Liberal Democrats	Sean Duffy	157	4.4	+1.8
Green	Steven Kelly	88	2.5	−0.1
Majority		931	26.3	+21.9
Turnout		3,543	28.5	+4.3
Conservative hold		Swing	+8.6	

Frinton & Walton
Party	Candidate	Votes	%	±%
Conservative	Mark Platt	3,066	52.0	+14.2
Tendring First	Terry Allen	1,332	22.6	+3.0
Labour	Andy White	616	10.4	−0.7
UKIP	Richard Everett	563	9.5	−19.1
Green	Susan Clutterbuck	192	3.3	+1.7
Liberal Democrats	Simon Banks	131	2.2	New
Majority		1,734	29.4	+20.3
Turnout		5,925	38.1	+2.4
Conservative hold		Swing	+5.6	

Harwich
Party	Candidate	Votes	%	±%
Labour	Ivan Henderson *	2,427	51.4	+10.3
Conservative	Ricky Callender	1,374	29.1	+7.8
UKIP	Aaron Hammond	725	15.4	−5.9
Liberal Democrats	Owen Bartholomew	106	2.2	−1.0
Green	Paul Clutterbuck	88	1.9	+0.2
Majority		1,053	21.7	+7.7
Turnout		4,726	35.6	+4.5
Labour hold		Swing	+1.2	

Tendring Rural East
Party	Candidate	Votes	%	±%
Conservative	Andy Erskine *	2,388	51.1	+22.3
UKIP	Jeff Bray	1,035	22.1	−6.7
Labour	Maria Fowler	762	16.3	+1.0
Liberal Democrats	Matthew Bensilum	279	6.0	+2.0
Green	Chris Southall	212	4.5	+0.5
Majority		1,353	29.0	+22.8
Turnout		4,676	32.2	+2.1
Conservative gain from UKIP		Swing	+17.6	

The Conservative candidate was elected previously as a UKIP candidate and subsequently switched their party affiliation. The seat is therefore shown as a gain.

Tendring Rural West
Party	Candidate	Votes	%	±%
Conservative	Carlo Guglielmi *	2,668	59.5	+21.6
Labour	Maison Urwin	552	12.3	New
Liberal Democrats	Rain Welham-Cobb	536	12.0	−6.2
UKIP	Mary Newton	388	8.6	−19.9
Green	Duncan Gordon	340	7.6	−1.0
Majority		2,116	47.2	+17.7
Turnout		4,484	33.3	+3.8
Conservative hold		Swing	+4.7	

=== Uttlesford ===
District Summary

Party	Seats	+/-	Votes	%	+/-
Conservative	4	▲1	10,884	45.6	+2.9
Residents for Uttlesford	0	▼1	5,231	21.9	+11.9
Liberal Democrat	0	Steady	4,278	17.9	+1.3
Labour	0	Steady	1,707	7.1	−1.1
UKIP	0	Steady	965	4.0	−14.0
Green	0	Steady	815	3.4	−1.0

Division Results

Dunmow
Party	Candidate	Votes	%	±%
Conservative	Susan Barker *	3,389	55.9	+3.6
R4U	Alexander Armstrong	1,457	24.0	New
Liberal Democrats	Lori Flawn	402	6.6	−1.2
Labour	Bill McCarthy	399	6.6	−2.9
UKIP	Alan Stannard	283	4.7	−20.8
Green	Ashley Payne	133	2.2	−2.6
Majority		1,932	31.9	+5.1
Turnout		6,063	31.4	+3.6
Conservative hold		Swing	−10.2	

Saffron Walden
Party	Candidate	Votes	%	±%
Conservative	John Moran	2,468	35.6	+2.1
R4U	Heather Asker	2,201	31.8	−2.5
Liberal Democrats	Joan Shibata	1,211	17.5	+7.5
Labour	Simon Trimnell	619	8.9	+0.8
Green	Sarah Allington	246	3.6	−0.4
UKIP	Raymond Tyler	182	2.6	−7.4
Majority		267	3.8	New
Turnout		6,927	42.5	+4.8
Conservative gain from R4U		Swing	+2.3	

Stansted
Party	Candidate	Votes	%	±%
Conservative	Raymond Gooding *	2,317	37.4	−3.3
Liberal Democrats	Melvin Caton	1,711	27.6	−4.1
R4U	Anthony Gerard	1,573	25.4	New
Labour	Thomas van de Bilt	284	4.6	−2.6
UKIP	David Allum	175	2.8	−14.2
Green	Karmel Stannard	132	2.1	−1.3
Majority		606	9.8	+0.9
Turnout		6,192	40.4	+3.0
Conservative hold		Swing	+0.4	

Thaxted
Party	Candidate	Votes	%	±%
Conservative	Simon Walsh *	2,710	57.7	+10.7
Liberal Democrats	Antionette Wattebot	954	20.3	+3.6
Labour	Peter Simmons	405	8.6	+0.3
UKIP	Lorna Howe	325	6.9	−15.0
Green	Paul Allington	304	6.5	+0.4
Majority		1,756	37.4	+12.4
Turnout		4,698	33.6	+4.6
Conservative hold		Swing	+3.5	

== By-elections ==
=== Summary ===
By-election	Date	Incumbent party	Winning party
Clacton East	3 October 2019	Independent	Independent

=== Results ===
==== Clacton East ====
Clacton East By-Election: 3 October 2019
Party	Candidate	Votes	%	±%
Independent	Mark Stephenson	1,231	36.9	+21.8
Conservative	Chris Amos	1,223	36.6	+5.3
Holland Residents	K.T. King	537	16.1	+16.1
Liberal Democrats	Callum Robertson	140	4.2	+2.4
Labour	Geoff Ely	111	3.3	−6.1
Green	Chris Southall	97	2.9	+1.3
Majority		8	0.2	−9.4
Turnout		3,339	25.3	—10.5
Independent hold		Swing	+8.3	

Stephenson's vote share change is compared to the 2017 result when he stood as a UKIP candidate.
